= List of Tosafists =

Tosafists were rabbis of France, Germany, Bohemia and Austria, who lived from the 12th to the mid-15th centuries, in the period of Rishonim. Some migrated to Acre as part of the Aliyah of the Tosafists. The Tosafists composed critical and explanatory glosses (questions, notes, interpretations, rulings and sources) on the Talmud, which are collectively called Tosafot ("additions"). The Tosafot are important to the practical application of Jewish law, because the law depends on how the Talmud is understood and interpreted.

== Alphabetical list of Tosafists ==
Not all of the many tosafists are known by name. The following is an alphabetical list of them; many, however, are known only through citations.

=== A (HaRA) ===
Quoted in the edited Tosafot to Mo'ed Katan 14b, 19a, 20b, 21a etc.

=== Avigdor Cohen of Vienna ===
Also known as Avigdor ben Elijah ha-Kohen. Flourished in the middle of the 13th century and an early Talmudists of Austria; his tosafot are mentioned in the edited tosafot to Ketuvot 63b.

=== Abraham ben Joseph of Orleans ===
French Talmudist; lived in Orleans, and perhaps London, in the 12th century. One of the older tosafists, his interpretations of the Talmud are quoted several times in the Tosafot. He is mentioned as the father of three daughters. He was the father-in-law of Judah ben Isaac Messer Leon, and therefore a contemporary of Rabbeinu Tam of Rameru, the head of the tosafistic school in the middle of the 12th century.

=== Asher ben Jehiel (RoSH) ===
Resided in Cologne and later in Toledo, Spain. His tosafot, entitled Tosefot haRosh or Tosefei Tosafot, appeared in various epochs and works. Many of them were inserted by Bezalel Ashkenazi in Shitah Mekubetzet; those to Yebamot and Ketubot appeared separately at Livorno, 1776; to Sotah, partly at Prague, 1725, and partly in Jacob Faitusi's Mar'eh haOfannim (1810); to Megillah and Shevuot, in Elijah Borgel's Migdanot Natan (1785); and to Kiddushin, in the Ma'aseh Rokem (Pisa, 1806). His tosafot to Niddah are included in the Vilna Romm edition of the Talmud.

=== Baruch ben Isaac ===
Born in Worms, he lived in Regensburg.

=== Eleazar ben Judah of Worms ===
Author of tosafot to Baba Kamma, extracts from which are found in Bezalel Ashkenazi's Shitah Mekubetzet.

=== Elhanan ben Isaac of Dampierre ===
Flourished at the end of the 12th century; his tosafot are mentioned by Abraham ben David (RABaD) in his "Temim De'im" and in the edited tosafot to Bava Metzia 11b and Shevuot 28a. His tosafot to Nedarim are referred to by Joseph Colon (Responsa, No. 52); those to Megillah, in Isaiah di Trani the Elder's "Ha-Makria" (No. 31, p. 19d); those to Avadah Zarah, in "Mordechai" (No. 1364).

=== Eliezer ben Joel HaLevi (Ra'avyah) ===
Flourished in the beginning of the 13th century in Germany; author of tosafot to several tractates, and to Sefer Ra'avyah.

=== Eliezer ben Nathan (Ra'avan) ===
Wrote about the Persecutions of 1096.

=== Eliezer ben Samuel of Metz (Re'EM) ===
Author of tosafot to several tractates, of which those to Hullin were seen by Azulai.

=== Eliezer of Toul ===
French tosafist of the beginning of the 13th century, whose tosafot are mentioned in Shibbolei HaLeket.

=== Eliezer of Touques ===
French tosafist of the late 13th century.

=== Elijah ben Menahem Ha-Zaken ===
His tosafot are mentioned in "Haggahot Maimuniyyot," Kinnim, No. 20.

=== Elijah of Paris ===
French tosafist of 12th century, contemporary and disputant of Rabbeinu Tam.

=== Haim ben Hananel HaCohen ===
Rabbeinu Haim ben Hananel HaCohen (12th century) was a student and colleague of Rabbeinu Tam.

=== R"I ===
RI (probably R. Isaac, but not to be confused with Isaac ben Samuel, who occurs most often as RI) His tosafot, in which the older RI is quoted, are mentioned by Samson ben Zadok.

=== Isaac ben Abraham of Dampierre ===
Brother of Samson ben Abraham of Sens. Succeeded his teacher Isaac ben Samuel as head of the school of Dampierre, and as a result is also known as Rabbi Isaac haBaḥur ("Rabbi Isaac the Younger"), or RIBA (acronym of Rabbi Isaac Ben Abraham).

=== Isaac ben Asher ha-Levi ===
The earliest known Tosafist, a student of Rashi.

=== Isaac ben Jacob ha-Laban ===
Student of Rabbeinu Tam and one of the earlier tosafists ("ba'ale tosafot yeshanim"). He was the author of a commentary on Ketubot quoted by Or Zarua. He is quoted very often in the edited tosafot (Yevamot 5b; Bava Kamma 72a; et al.).

=== Isaac ben Judah HaLevi ===
French Tosafist; lived at Sens, probably, in the second half of the 13th century.

=== Isaac ben Meir (Rivam) of Ramerupt ===
Grandson of Rashi, and brother of RaSHBaM and Rabbeinu Tam; died before his father, leaving four children. Although he died young, Isaac wrote tosafot, mentioned by Eliezer ben Joel HaLevi, to several tractates of the Talmud. Isaac himself is often quoted in the edited tosafot (Shabbat 138a; Ketuvot 29b et passim).

=== Isaac ben Mordecai of Regensburg (RIBaM) ===
Flourished in the 12th century; student of Isaac ben Asher ha-Levi. He corresponded with Jacob Tam and was a fellow student of Moses b. Joel and Ephraim b. Isaac. His tosafot are quoted by Eliezer ben Joel HaLevi and Meir of Rothenburg. He is often quoted also in the edited tosafot.

=== Isaac ben Reuben ===
His tosafot are mentioned in Shitah Mekubetzet, Ketubot 43a. He may be identical with the Isaac b. Reuben who made a comment on Rashi to Bava Kamma 32d.

=== Isaac ben Samuel haZaken (Ri haZaken) ===
French tosafist and Biblical commentator who flourished in the 12th century.

=== Isaiah di Trani (RID) ===
Italian tosafist of the first half of the 13th century. The greater part of his tosafot were published under the title "Tosefot R. Yesha'yahu" (Lemberg, 1861–69); and many were inserted by Betzalel Ashkenazi in Shitah Mekubetzet.

=== Israel of Bamberg ===
Lived in the middle of the 13th century; mentioned as an author of tosafot in "Mordechai" and "Haggahot Mordechai" (to Shabbat 14). Extracts from the tosafot of Israel's students were reproduced by Bezaleel Ashkenazi (l.c.).

=== Judah ha-Kohen ===
Supposedly a contemporary of Meir of Rothenburg, and perhaps identical with Judah ha-Kohen, Meir's relative. In the extracts from his tosafot to Baba Kamma, inserted in Shitah Mekubetzet, he quotes (among many other authorities) his still living teacher, the Kohen whom Zunz supposes to be identical with Avigdor Cohen of Vienna. From Shitah Mekubetzet to Baba Metzia it is seen that J. Cohen wrote tosafot to the same tractate.

=== Jacob of Chinon ===
Lived in the 13th century; student of Isaac ben Abraham, author of a "Shiṭṭah" He himself is quoted in the edited tosafot (Berachot 12a; Nazir 53a; et al.).

=== Joel ben Isaac ha-Levi (Jabez) ===
Flourished at Speyer about 1130; a student of Kalonymus b. Isaac the Elder. He was the author of tosafot and of decisions ("pesakim"). He is quoted also in the edited tosafot (to Kinnim 23a).

=== Jacob ben Meir (Jacob Tam, Rabbeinu Tam) ===
Leading tosafist, who lived in the 12th century. Grandson of Rashi.

=== Yechiel of Paris ===
13th century French tosafist. Defended Judaism in the Disputation of Paris. Reported to have moved to Acre, Israel in about 1258, approximately ten years before his death.

=== Joseph (or Yehosef) ===
Flourished, according to Zunz, about 1150. Zunz identifies this Joseph with the student of Rashbam whose glosses are quoted in the edited tosafot (to Ket. 70a), and thinks he may be identical with the Joseph of Orleans often cited in the edited tosafot (Shabbat 12a et passim). If so, he must be identified, according to Henri Gross, with Joseph ben Isaac Bekhor Shor. Weiss, however, suggests that this Joseph might have been either Joseph Bonfils, Rabbeinu Tam's teacher, or Joseph b. Isaac of Troyes, one of Rashi's students. Thus it seems that in any case the tosafist mentioned in the "Sefer haYashar" must be distinguished from the one mentioned in Tosafot Ketuvot 70a, as the latter was a student of Rashbam.

=== Joseph Porat ===
Many fragments of his tosafot to Shabbat are included in the edited tosafot.

=== Judah ben Isaac Messer Leon (Judah ben Isaac of Paris) ===
12th-13th centuries; a French tosafist born in Paris. He founded an important school of tosafists, in which were trained, among others, Yechiel of Paris (Sir Leon's successor), Isaac ben Moses of Vienna (author of Or Zarua), Samuel ben Solomon of Falaise, and Moses ben Jacob of Coucy.

=== Judah ben Nathan (RIVaN) ===
Son-in-law and pupil of Rashi, and to a great extent his continuator. It was Judah who completed Rashi's commentary on Makkot (from 19b to the end) and who wrote the commentary on Nazir which is erroneously attributed to Rashi. He wrote, besides, independent commentaries on Eruvin, Shabbat, Yebamot and Pesachim. Finally, Halberstam manuscript No. 323 contains a fragment of Judah's commentary on Nedarim. It is generally considered that Judah b. Nathan wrote tosafot to several tractates of the Talmud, and he is mentioned as a tosafist in "Haggahot Mordechai" (Sanhedrin, No. 696). He is often quoted in the edited tosafot.

=== Judah ben Yom Tov ===
11th century French rabbi

=== Levi ===
His tosafot are quoted in the "Mordechai" (Bava Metzia 4, end).

=== Meir ben Baruch of Rothenburg (MaHaRaM) ===
Leading tosafist of 13th century Germany. Abducted by Christians and died in prison.

=== Meïr ben Samuel of Ramerupt ===
Son-in-law of Rashi. His tosafot are mentioned by his son Jacob Tam ("Sefer ha-Yashar," No. 252) and often in the edited tosafot.

=== Moses ben Jacob of Coucy ===
French tosafist, early 13th century. Author of Sefer Mitzvot Gadol.

=== Moses ben Meir of Ferrara ===
Italian tosafist of the 13th century, whose tosafot were used by the compiler of the "Haggahot Maimuniyyot." Moses himself used the tosafot of Judah ben Isaac Messer Leon, although it is doubtful whether he was Judah's pupil.

=== Moses of Évreux ===
French tosafist, early 13th century.

=== Moses Taku ===
13th-century Tosafist from Bohemia.

=== Peretz ben Elijah of Corbeil ===
French tosafist, 13th century.

=== HaRebbi R' Menachem ===
Mentioned in Baba Kama 2b s.v. "umilta," as well as by Hagahot Maimoniyot to Rambam's laws of chametz and matzah, chapter 6, note 9.

=== Samson ben Abraham of Sens ===
France, late 12th-early 13th century. Known by the acronym "Rash", and within Tosafot as "Rashba".

=== Samson b. Isaac of Chinon ===
Flourished in the 13th and 14th centuries; author of the "Sefer Keritut." In this work Samson refers to his glosses on Eruvin and Avodah Zarah; he appears to have written glosses on other Talmudic tractates also.

=== Samson b. Samson of Coucy ===
Flourished in the 12th and 13th centuries.

=== Samuel of Évreux ===
Author of tosafot to several tractates; those to Sotah are among the edited tosafot.

=== Samuel ben Meir (RaSHBaM) ===
Rashi's grandson and author of tosafot to Alfasi; under his supervision his students prepared tosafot to several tractates ("Sefer ha-Yashar," p. 85d).

=== Samuel b. Naṭronai (RaShBaṬ) ===
German Talmudist of the end of the 12th century; author of tosafot to Avodah Zarah.

=== Samuel ben Solomon of Falaise ===
French tosafist, 12th-13th centuries.

=== Simha of Speyer (Simḥah ben Samuel of Speyer) ===
Flourished in the 13th century; his tosafot are mentioned by Meir of Rothenburg.

=== Yom Tov of Falaise ===
11th-century French rabbi, grandson of Rashi.
