= Jacob ben Abraham Faitusi =

Jacob ben Abraham Faitusi (died July 1812 in Algiers) was a Tunisian Jewish scholar. He settled in the later part of his life at Jerusalem, whence he was sent as a collector of alms to Italy and Algeria.

Faitusi was the author of Berit Ya'aqob (Livorno, 1800), the contents of which were as follows: sermons; Bezalel Ashkenazi's "Shittah Mequbbetzet" on Sotah, with the editor's notes, entitled "Yagel Ya'aqob"; glosses of the Geonim on the Talmudical treatises Nedarim and Nazir, with the editor's notes; commentaries on Nazir by Abraham ben Musa; "Sha'are Tzedeq," a commentary, attributed to Levi ben Gershon, on the thirteen hermeneutic rules of Rabbi Ishmael; novellæ on Chullin and Pesachim; and poems, entitled "Qontres Acharon."

Faitusi wrote also Yerek Ya'aqob (Livorno, 1842), sermons arranged in the order of the Sabbatical sections, with an appendix entitled "Ya'ir Kokab mi-Ya'aqob," containing novellæ and responsa. He also edited Mizbach Kapparah of Nachmanides; Bezalel Ashkenazi's Shittah Mequbbetzet on Zebachim and various tosafot of Rabbi Perez, Eliezer of Touques, and others on several Talmudical treatises, with an appendix entitled "Ranenu le-Ya'aqob" (Livorno, 1810) containing Talmudic novellæ and sermons by Jacob (republished with additions by Saul ha-Levi, Lemberg, 1861); "Sefer Mar'eh ha-Ofannim" (Livorno, 1810), containing Asher ben Jehiel's novellæ on Sotah, Aaron ha-Levi's "Shittah" on Betzah, and an appendix entitled "Yagel Ya'aqob," containing novellæ on Pesachim, Betzah, Rosh Hashanah, Mo'ed Katan, Avodah Zarah, and Makkot.

== Bibliography ==
- Nepi, Graziadio and Ghirondi, Mordecai, Toledot Gedole Yisrael, p. 211
- Steinschneider, Moritz, Catalogus Librorum Hebræorum in Bibliotheca Bodleiana col. 1210
- Zedner, Joseph, Catalogue of the Hebrew Books in the British Museum, p. 247
- Cazès, David, Notes Bibliographiques sur la Littérature Juive Tunisienne, pp. 182 et seq.
