= Haim ben Hananel HaCohen =

12th-century Tosafist

Rabbeinu Haim ben Hananel Hacohen
- Occupation: Tosafist
- Era: 12th century
- Children: Aharon ben Haim, Nahman ben Haim,
- Relatives: Moses ben Jacob of Coucy (grandson)

Rabbeinu Haim ben Hananel HaCohen (12th century) was one of the early Ba'alei Tosafot and a student and colleague of Rabbeinu Tam. He was active primarily in France and Germany.

== Biography ==
Haim HaCohen was one of Rabbeinu Tam's older students and Rabbenu Tam's other students saw him as the foremost among them. Rabbi Eliezer ben Joel HaLevi wrote that Rabbeinu Haim supervized Rabbi Eliezer (ben Samuel) of Metz's Tosafot commentary to Zevachim. Many of the Tosafists, including Isaac ben Jacob ha-Lavan, Elijah of Paris (who was married to Rabbeinu Haim's wife's sister) and other students of Rabbeinu Tam sent him their Halakhic questions and rulings.

Isaac ben Samuel (R"I) wrote of him, "My teacher, Rabbeinu Haim, upon whom the honor of the entire generation rested... the beth din of my teacher, Rabbeinu Haim is like the Sanhedrin."

While learning in his beth midrash, he played an active roll in crafting the responses of Rabbeinu Tam. This strengthened his reputation as one of his leading students. His words are cited dozens of times in Tosefot's commentary, which is printed in the Talmud.

He once said that if he had been present at Rabbeinu Tam's death, he would have allowed himself to become impure for him despite being a kohen, since Rabbeinu Tam was the greatest of his generation (gadol hador). This was based on the words of Hiyya the Great at the death of Judah ha-Nasi.

=== Location ===
There is debate whether he lived in France or Germany (Alsace). Many scholars claimed he was from Paris, because he was able to exchange halachic responsa with Rabbi Elijah of Paris quickly, and because in one place he is referred to as "Rabbeinu Haim from Paris" ("Rabbeinu Haim meParis").

However, according to Rami Reiner, Rabbeinu Haim went to France to learn under Rabbeinu Tam and then returned to Germany, his place of birth and flourished in Mainz. At the end of his life he emigrated to Paris where he studied under Abraham ben Nathan, and he died there.

Reiner showed that other versions of the text have him exchanging responsa with Eliezer of Metz, rather than Elijah of Paris. he also argued that description "Rabbeinu Haim of Paris" comes from a misreading of "Rabbeinu Haim explains" ("Rabbeinu Haim mefaresh"). On this basis, he rejected the claim that Rabbeinu Haim lived in Paris.

Reiner claims that after completing his studies with Rabbeinu Tam, Rabbeinu Haim spent time in Germany and was active in Mainz alongside Rabbi Eliezer of Metz. At that time, Rabbeinu Baruch ben Samuel also learned under him. His evidence is that in one version of the text In "Sefer HaManhig," Abraham ben Nathan describes him as "Rabbeinu Haim ben Hananel HaCohen of Germany." He also shows that the Piyyutim written by Rabbeinu Haim's son were composed in France but have the hallmarks of German style.

=== Family ===
There is one responsum where Rabbinu Haim asked Rabbi Samson ben Abraham of Sens whether it is permitted for a widower to remarry before three Jewish holidays had passed. Rabbi Samson, with the agreement of his brother, Isaac ben Abraham of Dampierre, ruled that it was forbidden, since the man lived in his son's house and did not urgently need a wife to support him. According to Ephraim Urbach, Haim was asking the question about himself, after his wife died while he lived in his son's home. However, Reiner says he was asking on behalf of someone else. The fact that he did not he did not address the question to Rabbeinu Isaac ben Samuel, but to his students, shows that the incident occurred after Rabbeinu Isaac's death in 1189.

His brothers-in-law were Rabbi Elijah of Paris, Rabbi Yom Tov of Joigny and Rabbi Jacob of Corbeil, whose wives were sisters.

He had three sons, Aharon, Nachman, and Avraham, all of whom became rabbis. Aharon wrote a commentary on the poetry of the Ashkenazi Machzor, and Nachman authored a book called Nachmani.

His daughter married Rabbi Jacob of Coucy, and their son was Rabbi Moses ben Jacob of Coucy, author of Sefer Mitzvot Gadol. He quotes his grandfather in his work, sometimes referring to him as : "Rabbi Chaim Kohen Gadol, my mother's father."

== Teachings ==
In addition to Tosafot on Zevahim, that Rabbi Eliezer ben Samuel composed under his supervision, he likely also composed his own version of Tosefot to this tractate, which are the basis of the Tosafot printed alongside this tractate. He is mentioned 98 times in Tosafot, nearly half of those mentions are in Zevahim, and many of the others also deal with issues from this tractate. He also composed Tosafot to Bava Batra, and perhaps also to the Pesachim and Yoma.

It seems that he devoted a lot of time to dealing with Kodashim and topics related to kohanim. Accordingly, he limited the application of the principle of not ruling on halachic matters which will have no practical relevance until after the arrival of the Messiah. In his opinion, this rule only applies to laws which even in the days of the Messiah will be rare and resulting from sin. His focus on sacrifices and priestly matters are likely related to the fact that he himself was a kohen.

According to Reiner, Rabbenu Haim's rulings combine the scholarly creativity that Rabbi Tam revived, with the effort to maintain existing customs and ways accepted by his generation. He was also inclined to rule leniently.

=== Famous rulings ===
==== Emigration to Israel nowadays ====
One of his famous rulings is the statement that there is no mitzvah in immigrating to Israel at this time: "And Rabbeinu Haim would say that now there is no mitzvah to live in the Land of Israel."

There are several versions of the reason for this ruling. According to what is stated in Tosafot, the reason is that it is difficult to observe the laws and customs which are dependent on the land: "Because there are several mitzvot which are dependent on the land and several punishments and we cannot be careful about them or abide by them."

The Mordechai explains the reason is that it is dangerous to travel to Israel: "Rabbeinu Haim Cohen wrote in a responsum that these words were in their days when there was peace on the roads, but now that the roads are difficult, he cannot force [his wife to emigrate to Israel] because it is like someone who wants to lead her to a place of wild animals and highwaymen, and even if he provides her guarantees with his body and money, your guarantee requires a guarantee."

On the other hand, regarding the Sages' prohibition of renting a house to an idolator, based on the verse "And you shall not bring an abomination into your house," Rabbeinu Haim said that outside Israel this is permissible, because the concept of "house" applies only in the Land of Israel: "And Rav Rabbeinu Haim would give a reason to permit... Because outside the land it is not called your home, but only in the land of Israel.

==== Impurity of kohanim 'a sword is like a corpse' ====
According to Rabbi Tam, touching a metal vessel that was in the tent of a corpse obligates a Nazirite to shave, because it imparts ritual impurity, "And Rabbeinu Haim Cohen sent him, 'What house you will build for me, for if a Nazirite shaves over this, so too, a kohen is warned against it. There will be no house that does not have some metal vessel or nail that was in the tent with a corpse,'"

==== Nullifying one type in another type ====
In contrast to the opinion of his teacher, Rabbeinu Tam, which says that a mixture of one type with another (bitul min beshe'aino mino) makes the taste like the essence (ta'am ke'ikar), Rabbeinu Haim holds that one does not receive lashes unless he consumes a kezayit in the time it takes to eat half a loaf (kezayit bechdei achilat peras).

==== Chametz on Passover is not considered 'something which can become permitted' ====
In his opinion, chametz on Passover is not considered "something which will become permitted" because it will again become forbidden the following year. This ruling is brought in the Shulchan Aruch. This is in contrast to the view of Maimonides that chametz on Passover is considered something which will become permitted.
