= Old Yishuv =

Ottoman-era Jewish community in Palestine

The Old Yishuv (Hebrew: היישוב הישן, romanized: haYishuv haYashan, lit. "Old Settlement") were the Jewish communities of the region of Palestine during the Ottoman period, up to the onset of Zionist aliyah waves, and the consolidation of the new Yishuv by the end of World War I. Unlike the new Yishuv, characterized by secular and Zionist ideologies promoting labor and self-sufficiency, the Old Yishuv primarily consisted of religious Jews who relied on external donations (Hebrew: צְדָקָה, romanized: Tzedakah, lit. 'Justice', often translated as 'Charity') for support.

The Old Yishuv evolved following a significant decline in Jewish communities across the region during late antiquity and the early Middle Ages, and was composed of three clusters. Firstly, Ladino-speaking Sephardic Jewish communities settled in the region during the late Mamluk and early Ottoman periods, alongside Arabic-speaking Musta'arabi communities, who were Jews who had already been living there since before the coming of Islam and had been culturally and linguistically Arabized. Secondly, Ashkenazi Jews emigrated from Europe in the 18th and early 19th centuries, forming another group. A third wave of Yishuv members arrived in the late 19th century, hailing from Europe, North Africa, Yemen, Persia, and the Caucasus. These migrations gave rise to two distinct communities within the Old Yishuv—the Sephardim (including Musta'arabim) and the Askhenazim.

Apart from the Old Yishuv centres in the Four Holy Cities—namely Jerusalem, Hebron, Tiberias and Safed—smaller communities also existed in Jaffa, Haifa, Peki'in, Acre, Nablus and Shfaram. Petah Tikva, although established in 1878 by the Old Yishuv, was also supported by the arriving Zionists.

The "Old Yishuv" term was coined by members of the "New Yishuv" in the late 19th century. Today, scholars generally concur that the term "Old Yishuv" does not strictly denote chronology or demographics, as many communities classified under this term arrived in the latter half of the 19th century. By the late Ottoman period, distinctions between the Old Yishuv and New Yishuv became blurred, particularly in urban neighborhoods and agricultural settlements. In the late 19th century, the Old Yishuv comprised 0.3% of the world's Jews, representing 2–5% of the population of the Palestine region. The establishment of Rishon LeZion, the first moshava founded by Hovevei Zion in 1882, could be considered the true beginning of the "New Yishuv".

== Background ==
While a vibrant Jewish center had continued to exist in the Galilee following the Jewish–Roman wars, its importance was reduced with increased Byzantine persecutions and the abolition of the Sanhedrin in the early 5th century. Jewish communities of the southern Levant under Byzantine rule fell into a final decline in the early 7th century, and with the Jewish revolt against Heraclius and Muslim conquest of Syria, the Jewish population had greatly reduced in numbers.

In early Middle Ages, the Jewish communities of southern Bilad al-Sham (southern Syria), living as dhimmis under Muslim rule, were dispersed among the key cities of the military districts of Jund Filastin and Jund al-Urdunn, with a number of poor Jewish villages existing in the Galilee and Judea. Despite temporary revival, the Third and Fourth Fitnas (Arab Muslim civil wars) drove many non-Muslims out of the country, with no evidence of mass conversions, except for Samaritans.

The Crusader period marked the most serious decline, lasting through the 12th century. Maimonides traveled from Spain to Morocco and Egypt, and stayed in the Holy Land, probably sometime between 1165 and 1167, before settling in Egypt. He had then become a personal physician of Saladin, escorting him throughout his war campaigns against the Kingdom of Jerusalem. Following the Crusaders' defeat and the conquest of Jerusalem, he urged Saladin to allow the resettlement of the Jews in the city, and several hundred of the long-existing Jewish community of Ashkelon resettled Jerusalem. Small Jewish communities were also existent at the time in Gaza and in desolate villages throughout upper and lower Galilee.

The immigration of a group of 300 Jews headed by the Tosafists from England and France in 1211 struggled very hard upon arrival in the region, as they had no financial support and no prospect of making a living. The vast majority of the settlers were wiped out during the Fourth Crusade; they arrived in 1219, and the few survivors were allowed to live only in Acre. Their descendants blended with the original Jewish residents, called Mustarabim or Maghrebim, but more precisely Mashriqes (Murishkes).

The Mamluk period (1260–1517) saw an increase in the Jewish population, especially in the Galilee, but the Black Death epidemics had cut the country's demographics by at least one-third. Safed and Jerusalem were the major populated Jewish urban areas, replacing Tiberias, Acre and Tyre.

In 1260, Rabbi Yechiel of Paris arrived in the Land of Israel, at the time part of Mamluk Empire, along with his son and a large group of followers, settling in Acre. There he established the Talmudic academy Midrash haGadol d'Paris. He is believed to have died there between 1265 and 1268 and is buried near Haifa, at Mount Carmel. Nahmanides arrived in 1267 and settled in Acre as well. In 1488, when Obadiah of Bertinoro arrived in the Mamluk domain of Syria and sent back letters regularly to his father in Italy, many in the diaspora came to regard living in Mamluk Syria as feasible.

== History ==
=== Revival ===
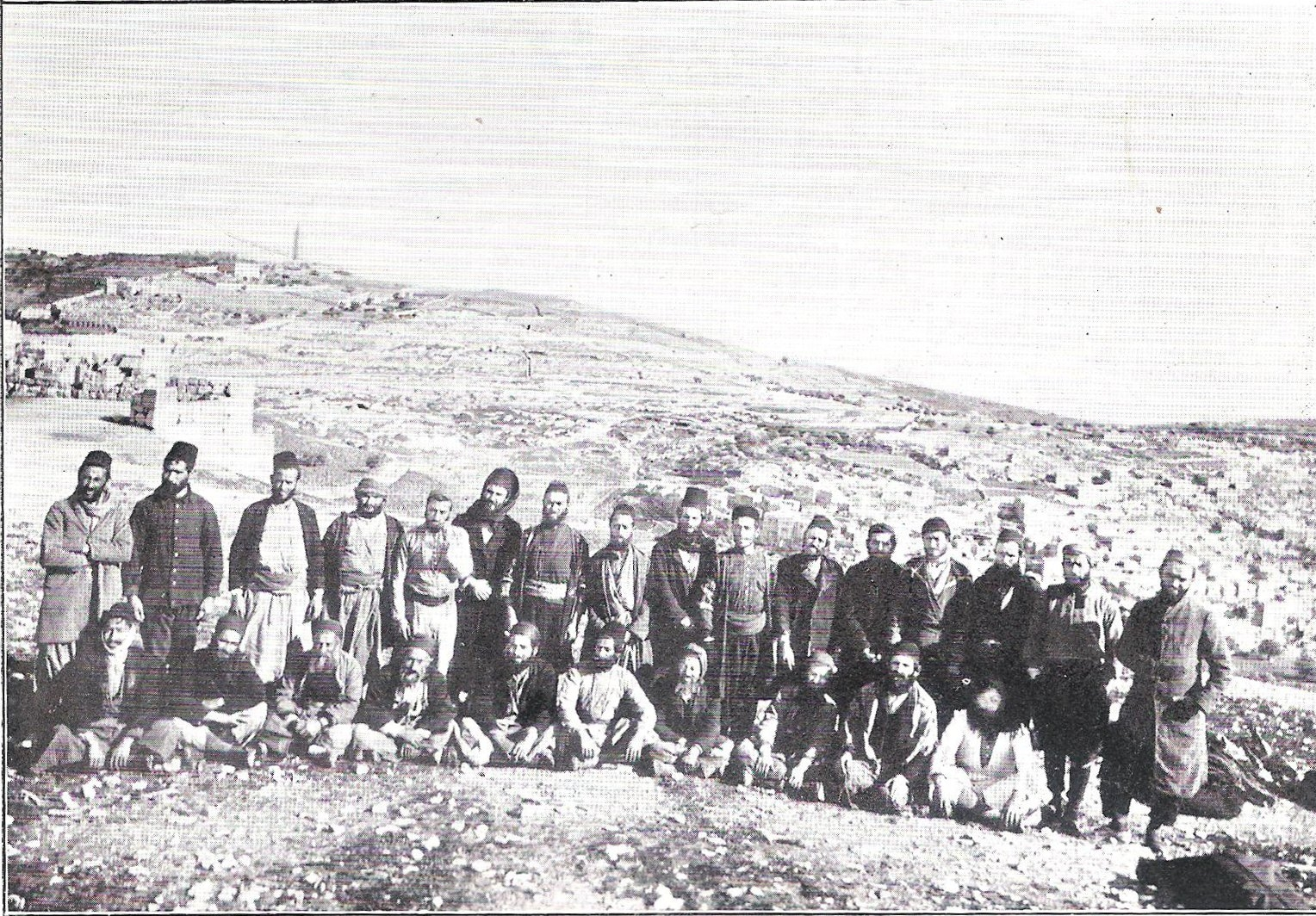
Photograph of Sephardi Jews in 19th century taken from 1899 book Views from Palestine and its Jewish colonies.

From 1360, when Louis I of Hungary had issued a decree of expulsion, Jewish people had sought refuge in the Ottoman Empire. In 1492 and again in 1498, when the Sephardic Jews were expelled from Spain and Portugal respectively, refugees migrated to the Land of Israel, which changed hands from Mamluks to Ottomans after the second Ottoman–Mamluk war, and Ottoman tolerance was seen as an alternative to Christian persecution. Joseph Nasi, with the financial backing and influence of his aunt, Gracia Mendes Nasi, succeeded in resettling Tiberias and Safed in 1561 with Sephardic Jews, many of them former Anusim.

From the mid-16th century, Safed had become the most influential center of Jewish mysticism and traditional halakha, inhabited by important rabbis and scholars. Among them were Rabbis Yakov bi Rav, Moses ben Jacob Cordovero, Yosef Karo, Abraham ben Eliezer Halevi and Isaac Luria. At this time there was a small community in Jerusalem headed by Rabbi Levi ibn Haviv also known as the Mahralbach. In 1620 Rabbi Yeshaye Horowitz, the Shelah Hakadosh, arrived from Prague.

By the early 17th century, the Ma'an Druzes initiated a power struggle, which led to instability in Mount Lebanon and the Galilee, eroding the Jewish communities. Economic shifts also led to negative demographic movement, and the Galilean Jewish population greatly declined. In 1660 Tiberias and Safed were laid in ruins by Ottoman-aligned Druze warlords during the Druze power struggle of 1658–1667, and the remaining Jews fled as far as Jerusalem. Though Jews returned to Safed in 1662, it became a majority-Muslim center of the Ottoman Safed Sanjak.

=== Judah HeHasid ===
In 1700, Judah HeHasid, a maggid of Shedlitz, Polish–Lithuanian Commonwealth made aliyah and settled in Jerusalem. A group of over 1,500 Ashkenazi Jews came with him, although some sources claim only 300 actually arrived. At that time, the Jewish population of the Old City of Jerusalem was primarily Sephardic: 200 Ashkenazi Jews compared with a Sephardi community of 1,000. The Ashkenazi immigrants heeded the call of HeHasid, who went from town to town advocating a return to the Land of Israel to redeem its soil. Almost a third of the group died of hardship and illness during the long journey. Upon their arrival in the Holy Land, they immediately went to Jerusalem.

Within days, HeHasid died. The survivors borrowed money from local Arabs for the rebuilding of the Hurva Synagogue but soon ran out of funds and borrowed more money at very high rates of interest. In 1720, when they were unable to repay their debts, Arab creditors broke into the synagogue, set it on fire, and destroyed their homes. The Jews fled the city and over the next century, any Jew dressed in Ashkenazi garb was a target of attack. Some of the Ashkenazi Jews who remained began to dress like Sephardic Jews. One known example is Abraham Gershon of Kitov.

=== Hasidim and Perushim ===
In the 18th century, groups of Hasidim and Perushim settled in the Land of Israel (Ottoman Southern Syria). In 1764 Rabbi Nachman of Horodenka, a disciple and father-in-law of the Baal Shem Tov settled in Tiberias. According to "Aliyos to Eretz Yisrael," he was already in Southern Syria in 1750.

In 1777, the Hasidic leaders Rabbi Menachem Mendel of Vitebsk and Rabbi Abraham Kalisker, disciples of the maggid Dov Ber of Mezeritch, settled in the area along with 300 hasidim. Misnagdim began arriving in 1780. Most of them settled in Safed or Tiberias, but a few established an Ashkenazi Jewish community in Jerusalem, rebuilding the ruins of the Hurva Synagogue, the destroyed synagogue of Judah HeHasid. Starting in 1830, about twenty disciples of Moses Sofer settled in Southern Syria, almost all of them in Jerusalem.

=== Egyptian rule ===
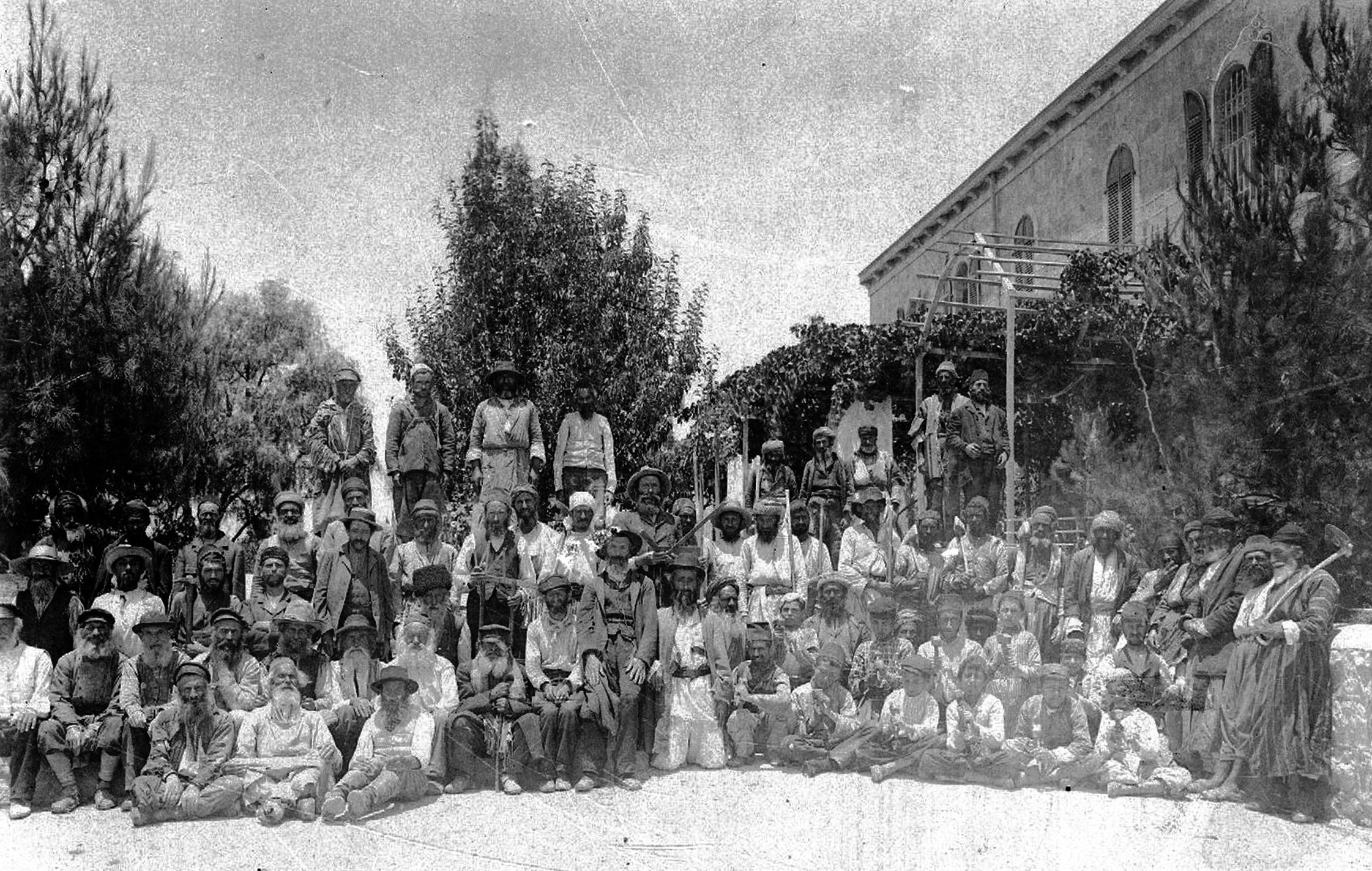
Jewish workers in Kerem Avraham neighborhood of Jerusalem in the mid-19th century

From 1831 to 1840, Syria fell under the rule of the Egyptian viceroy Muhammad Ali of Egypt and his son Ibrahim Pasha, who effectively extended the Egyptian domination to Damascus, driving the Ottomans north. Throughout the period a series of events greatly disturbed the demographic composition of the country, setting the stage for the 1834 Syrian Peasant revolts and the 1838 Druze Revolt, which greatly impacted the community of the Old Yishuv.

The greatest damage in lives and property was extended upon the Jewish communities of Safed and Hebron. In addition, the Galilee earthquake of 1837 destroyed Safed, killed thousands of its residents, and contributed to the reconstitution of Jerusalem as the main center of the Old Yishuv.

Generally tolerant to the minorities, Ibrahim Pasha promoted the Jewish and Christian communities of Southern Syria, but overall his turbulent period of rule is considered probably the worst stage for the development of the Old Yishuv.

=== Restored Ottoman rule ===
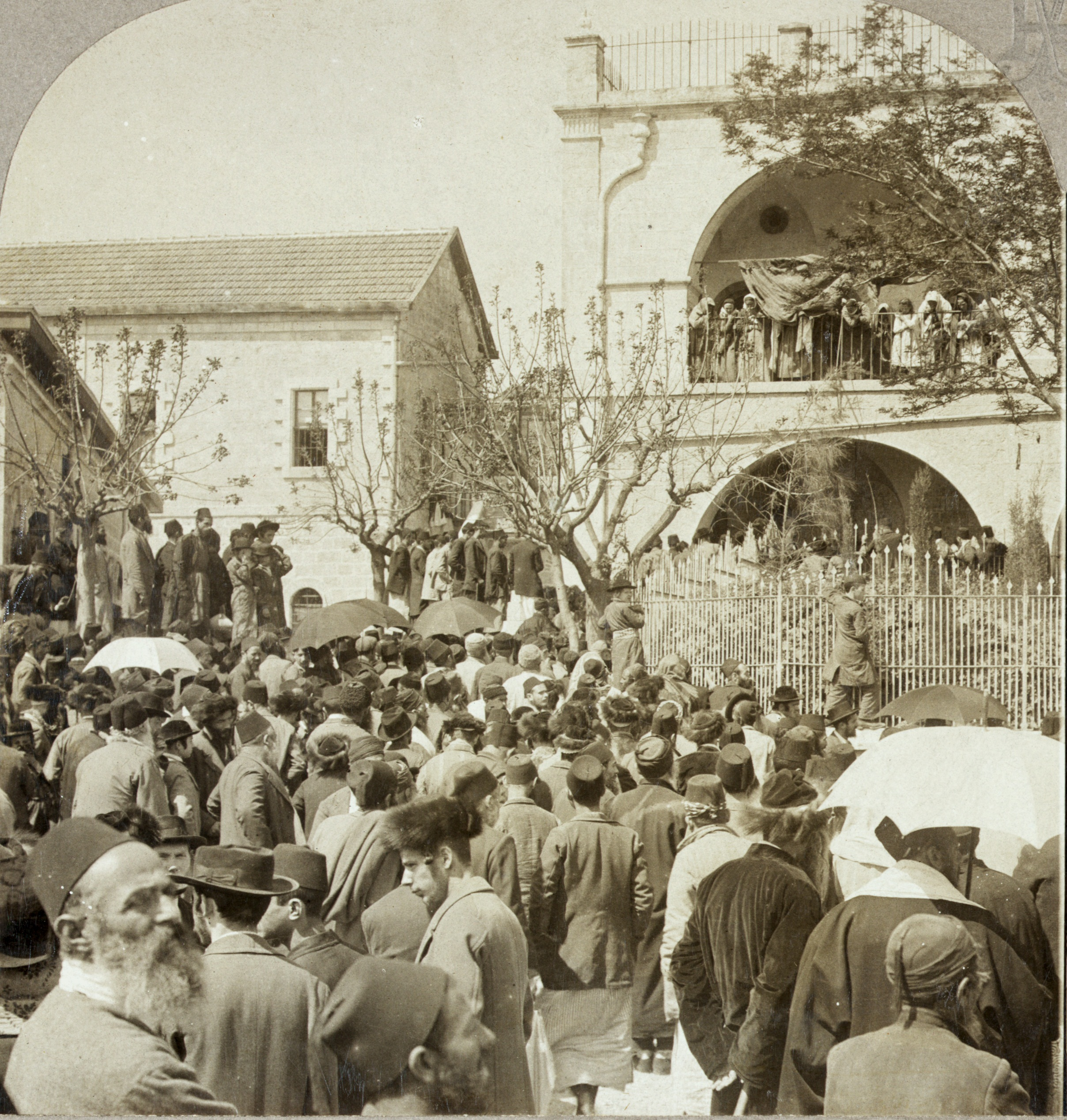
Funeral services for a Rabbi, Jerusalem, 1903

With the restoration of the Ottoman rule in 1840 with British and French intervention, the region began experiencing a serious rise in the population, rising from just 250,000 in 1840 to 600,000 by the end of the 19th century. Though most of the increase was Muslim, also the Jewish community gradually rose in numbers.

Several Jewish communities were established in the late 19th century, including Mishkenot Sha'ananim, which was built by British Jewish banker and philanthropist Sir Moses Montefiore in 1860 as an almshouse, paid for by the estate of an American Jewish businessman from New Orleans, Judah Touro; and Petah Tikva, established in 1878.

== Economy ==
=== Halukka ===
Many of the immigrant Jews were elderly and had immigrated to die in the Holy Land, whereas most in the Old Yishuv had lived for centuries in the four Holy cities of Safed, Hebron, Jerusalem, and Tiberias. These Jews were devoted to prayer and the study of Torah, Talmud, or Kabbalah, and had no independent source of living. As those Jews fulfilled the Talmudic commandment of God that the Jewish people must live in the Land of Israel to incite the coming of the Messiah, and, in part as they prayed for the welfare of the Jewish diaspora, the system of Jewish charity called halukka "distribution" evolved to support them.

As a living population, the religious Jews of the Old Yishuv helped the Diaspora maintain a stronger, deeper connection to the Land of Israel. In exchange, the Diaspora provided communities with financial support which was the economic succor of the residents of the Old Yishuv. Jews in the Diaspora observed Jewish religious traditions of the 613 commandments and tzedakah (charitable giving or actions). Many of the arrivals were noted Torah scholars whose communities felt honored to be represented and sent them ma'amodot "stipends" regularly. The kollel network was established many years prior in Jewish communities around the globe to financially support one another while under the civic authority and care of the governments of the countries in which Jews lived.

Money for this purpose was raised in Jewish communities around the world for distribution among the various kollels that were correspondingly established (by country or community of origin) in the Old Yishuv, especially in Jerusalem. From the 13th century until the beginning of the 20th century, Jewish communities of the Old Yishuv dispatched emissaries (shlihim or meshullahim) to raise money in for sustenance. The halukka system, which promoted dependence on charity, was harshly criticized in later years as being ineffectual, especially when Zionism arose in Europe (1830s–1880s). This period saw a shift from traditional forms of charity towards efforts of "self-help" and productivity both in the Land of Israel and in the Diaspora.

=== Etrog export ===
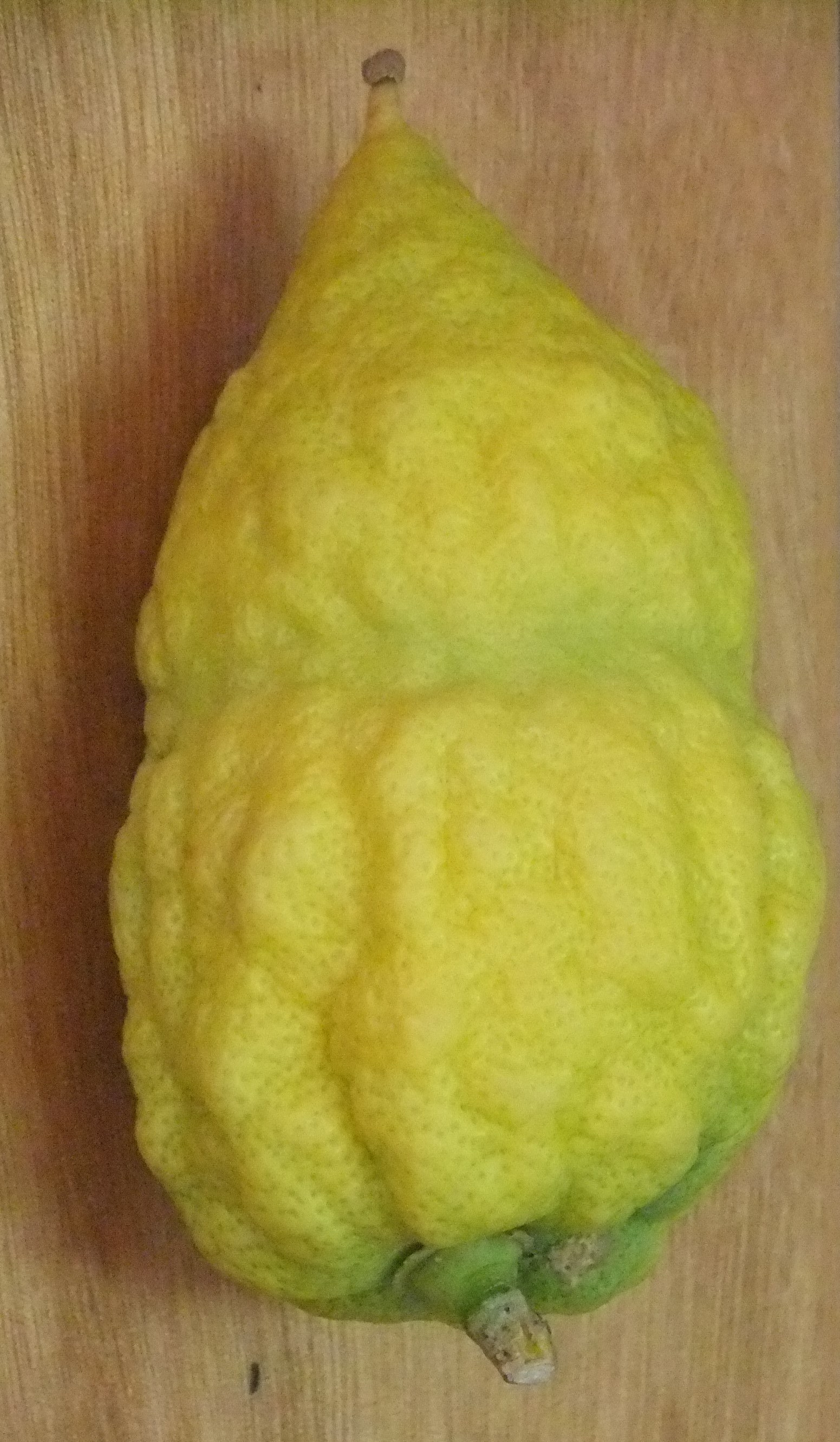
An Israeli etrog or Greek citron, with pitam and gartel (ridge around the center)

The export of etrogs was also a source of income for the Old Yishuv. This predated the Lovers of Zion idea of the return to the land and Jewish farming, before which etrogs for use as Sukkot were cultivated exclusively by Arab peasants and then merchandized by the Jews. According to Jacob Saphir, the etrog business was monopolized by the Sephardic kollel even before 1835. They had contracted with the Arabic growers of Umm al-Fahm for their entire progeny of Balady citron. In the 1840s they were also instrumental in the introduction of the Greek citron, which was already cultivated in Jewish-owned farms. In the 1870s the Sephardim switched to the Greek variety, and the Ashkenazi Salant partners took over the Balady business. After a little while, controversy erupted regarding its kashrut status.

Rabbi Chaim Elozor Wax, president of Kupath Rabbi Meir Baal Haness, a kollel of Warsaw, was instrumental in making the etrogs saleable in Ashkenazi Jewish communities in Europe. He planted thousands of trees in a donated orchard near Tiberias and turned the proceeds over to the Warsaw kollel.

=== Agricultural settlement ===
Generally the Old Yishuv did not participate in the creation of agricultural communities, which was begun in earnest by the immigrants that arrived from Eastern Europe beginning in the 1870s and 1880s, largely associated with the Hovevei Zion. Towards this end, Hovevei Zion members, including the philanthropist Isaac Leib Goldberg, purchased land from the Ottoman government and local inhabitants.

Although there was some earlier support from religious Jews in Europe such as Rabbi Zvi Hirsh Kalischer of Thorn—who published his views in Drishat Zion—Hovevei Zion encountered significant opposition from the religious community, which for example insisted on the adoption of ancient and ineffective Biblical farming rules.

=== Food ===
In the Jewish communities of the Old Yishuv, bread was baked at home. People would buy flour in bulk or take their own wheat to be milled into the flour to bake bread in brick or mud ovens. Small commercial bakeries were set up in the mid-19th century. Wheat flour was used to make challah and biscuits, ordinary bread and cooking. Because of its scarcity, bread that had dried was made into a pudding known as boyos de pan. Milk was usually reserved for pregnant women or the sick. Almond milk was often used as a substitute. Labneh or sour milk was sometimes purchased from Arab peasants. Sephardim kept soft cheese in tins of salt water to preserve it.

In the 1870s, meat was rare and eaten on Shabbat and festivals, but became more available towards the end of the 19th century; however, chicken remained a luxury item. Meat was primarily beef, but goat and lamb were eaten, particularly in the spring. Almost every part of the animal was used. Fresh fish was a rare and expensive food in Jerusalem, particularly in the winter. Salted cod was soaked and then prepared for both weekdays and Sabbath meals. Sephardim also had a preference for fish called gratto and for sardines. Another fish that was available was bouri (grey mullet).

Even until the end of the 19th century, both Ashkenazim and Sephardim in Jerusalem stored large quantities of foodstuffs for the winter. In Sephardi households, these included rice, flour, lentils, beans, olives and cheese. Ashkenazim stored wine, spirits, olives, sesame oil and wheat. At the end of the summer, large quantities of eggs were packed in slaked lime for the winter. Most Sephardic and Ashkenazi families would also buy large quantities of grapes to make wine. Olives and eggplants were pickled for preservation.

== See also ==
- History of the Jews and Judaism in the Land of Israel
- History of Zionism
- Palestinian Jews
- Mea Shearim
- Yemin Moshe
- Mishkenot Sha'ananim
- Edah HaChareidis
- Yehoshua Leib Diskin
- Yosef Chaim Sonnenfeld
- Jacob Israël de Haan
- Monsohn Family of Jerusalem

== Bibliography ==
- Parfitt, Tudor (1987) The Jews in Palestine, 1800–1882. Royal Historical Society studies in history (52). Woodbridge: Published for the Royal Historical Society by Boydell.
- Blau, Moshe, Al Chomothecha Yerushalaim על חומותיך ירושלים, Hebrew, Bnei Brak (1968)
- Rabbi Gedalya, Shaali Shelom Yerushalaim, Hebrew, Berlin (1726)- memoir of a participant in the Aliyah of Rabbi Yehuda Hasid
- Rossoff, Dovid Where Heaven Touches Earth: Jewish Life in Jerusalem from Medieval Times to the Present, Guardian Press, Jerusalem, 6th Ed., (2004) ISBN 0-87306-879-3
- Sofer, Yoseph Moshe, Moro DeAroh Yisroel מרא דארעא ישראל, Hebrew, Jerusalem (2003)
- Szold, Henrietta, Recent Jewish Progress in Palestine in American Jewish Year Book (1915–16)
- Yehoshua, Yakov, Ha’bayit ve Ha’rechov b’Yerushalayim Ha’yeshana (Home and Street in Old Jerusalem), Hebrew, Jerusalem, Rubin Mass (1961)
- Ha-Levanon Vol. 11 no 42, Hebrew, Mainz, 1875
- Ha-Levanon Vol. 11 no 43, Hebrew, Mainz, 1875
