= Touques, Calvados =

Touques
- Commune
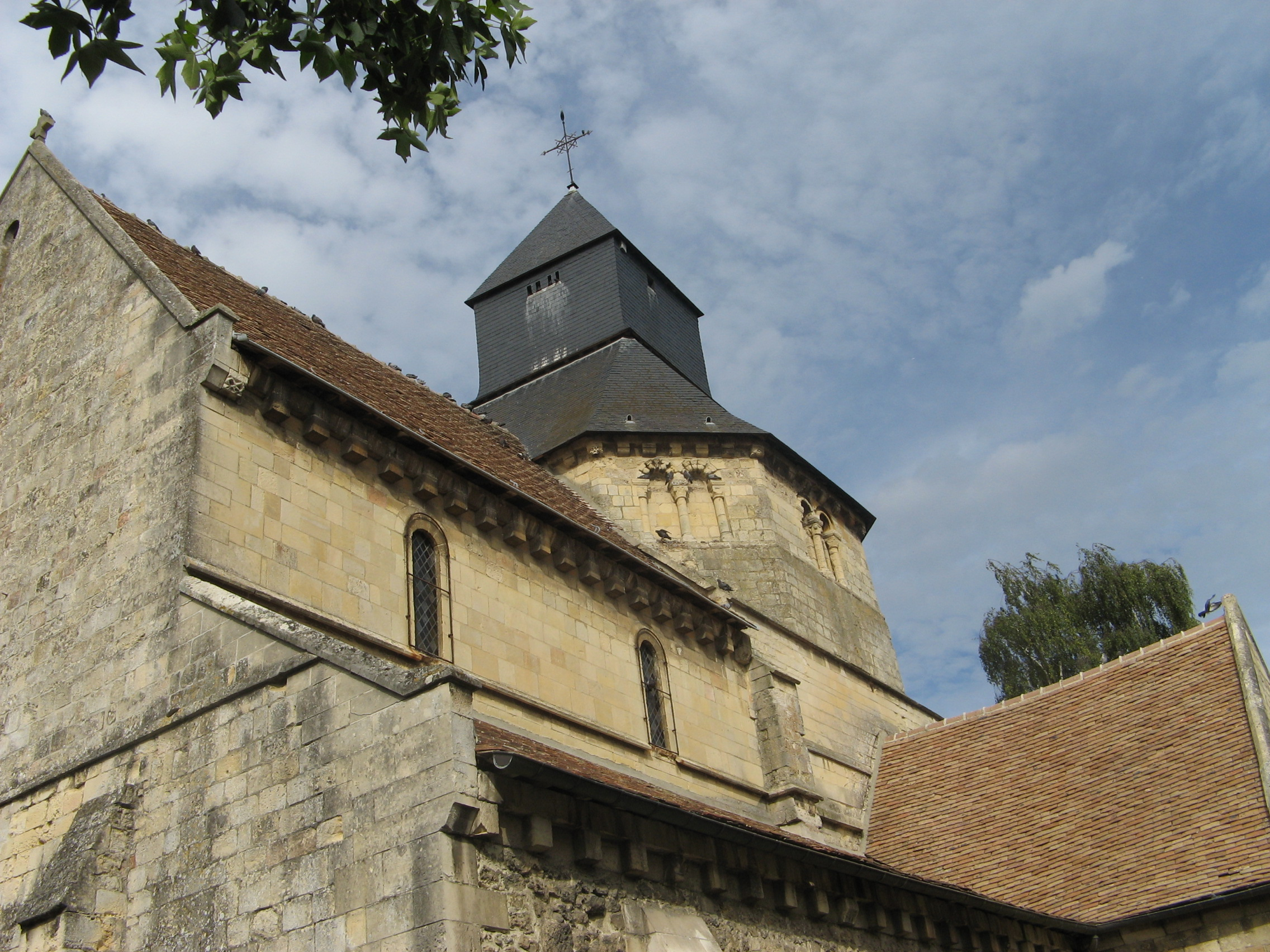
- The church in Touques

- Coat of arms
- Location of Touques
- Location within France Location within Normandy
- Coordinates: 49°20′36″N 0°06′10″E
- Country: France
- Region: Normandy
- Department: Calvados
- Arrondissement: Lisieux
- Canton: Honfleur-Deauville
- Intercommunality: CC Cœur Côte Fleurie

Government
  - Mayor (2024–2026): David Muller
- Area^{1}: 8.13 km^{2} (3.14 sq mi)
- Elevation: 6 m (20 ft)
- Highest elevation: 149 m (489 ft)
- Lowest elevation: 2 m (6.6 ft)
- Population (2023): 3,913
  - Density: 481/km^{2} (1,250/sq mi)
- Time zone: UTC+01:00 (CET)
  - Summer (DST): UTC+02:00 (CEST)
- INSEE/Postal code: 14699 /14800
- ^{1} French Land Register data, which excludes lakes, ponds, glaciers > 1 km^{2} (0.386 sq mi or 247 acres) and river estuaries.

Touques (French pronunciation: [tuk]) is a commune in the Calvados department in the Normandy region in northwestern France. It is situated on the river Touques, 3 km southeast of the sea resort Deauville.

== History ==
- Eliezer (ben Solomon) of Touques was a French tosafist, who lived at Touques in the second half of the thirteenth century. He abridged the tosafot of Samson of Sens, Samuel of Évreux, and many others, and added thereto marginal notes of his own, entitled "Gilyon Tosafot," or "Tosafot Gillayon".
- On 1 August 1417 Henry V of England, landed there.
- On 7 March 2021 Olivier Dassault crash landed on board a helicopter there.

== Population ==
Historical population
| Year | Pop. | ±% p.a. |
|---|---|---|
| 1968 | 1,587 | — |
| 1975 | 1,561 | −0.24% |
| 1982 | 2,237 | +5.27% |
| 1990 | 3,070 | +4.04% |
| 1999 | 3,500 | +1.47% |
| 2007 | 3,898 | +1.36% |
| 2012 | 3,920 | +0.11% |
| 2017 | 3,679 | −1.26% |
| 2023 | 3,913 | +1.03% |
Source: INSEE

== International relations ==
Touques is twinned with:

- Sankt Andreasberg (Germany)
- Strathspey, Scotland

== See also ==
- Communes of the Calvados department
