= Isaac ben Joseph of Corbeil =

Isaac ben Joseph of Corbeil (died 1280) (Hebrew: יצחק בן יוסף מקורבי״ל) was a 13th-century French rabbi and tosafist, best known as the author of Sefer Mitzvot Ḳatan.

== Biography ==
Isaac was the son-in-law of R. Yechiel of Paris, whose yeshiva he attended, and the pupil of the "Great Men of Évreux," notably Samuel of Évreux, whom he calls "the Prince" (שר) of Évreux. Isaac's conspicuous piety drew toward him many disciples, the best known of whom were Perez ben Elijah of Corbeil (Rabbeinu Perez), Baruch Ḥayyim ben Menahem of Niort, and his fellow citizen Joseph ben Abraham.

== Works ==
In 1277 – encouraged by his pupils – he published Sefer Mitzvot Katan (ספר מצוות קטן – "Small book of commandments"; generally called "Semak" from the initials סמ״ק), an abridgment of Moses ben Jacob of Coucy's Sefer Mitzvot Gadol (called "Semag" from its initials סמ״ג). The work's official title is Ammudei haGolah, and is written in the form of a poem. It is divided into 7 "pillars" as he says, "seven pillars corresponding the seven days of the week, and I have asked every man to read one pillar each day." It includes (contemporary) Halacha along with aggadic stories and mussar. Although based on the Sefer Mitzvot Gadol, the work does not delve into the argument behind the legal decision. "Semaḳ" was "most favorably received" by the Ashkenazi communities (France and Germany). It has often been edited and annotated, with most editions containing lengthy commentaries.

Isaac also published Liḳḳuṭim (collectanea), and several small compilations containing his ritual decisions.

The Kol Bo (No. 128) contains a long fragment of a Talmudic work of R. Isaac, with this superscription: קצת דינים מה״ר יצחק ז״ל.
