= Aaron ben Hayyim ha-Kohen =

13th century Jewish writer

Aaron ben Hayyim ha-Kohen was a Jewish writer of the 12th and 13th centuries. He was known as "the Saint". He was the nephew of Isaac ben Joseph of Corbeil and the otherwise unknown "Simeon of Coucy-leChâteau".

In 1227, after having compared all the copies of the French Machzor he could obtain, he wrote the Machzor, Code Uri, No. 225, to which he added a commentary consisting chiefly of compilations of written and traditional explanations from his uncle Ephraim ben Menahem, and from Shemaiah bar Isaac, Moses ben Kalonymus ha-Zaḳen, and Meshullam bar Simson. He seems to have known some Arabic, and quotes French and German words.

The scholar Adolf Neubauer thought that manuscript number 1209 in the Bodleian Library's Hebrew collection was a shorter form of the same compilation.
