= Samson of Coucy =

12th-13th century French rabbi and Tosafist

Samson ben Samson of Coucy (Hebrew: שמשון בן שמשון מקוצי), known as the Count (or Prince) of Coucy (Hebrew: השר מקוצי), was a French rabbi and Tosafist who flourished at the end of the twelfth and in the first half of the thirteenth century. (Note: Gotthard Deutsch; S. Mannheimer (1905). "SAMSON BEN SAMSON (called HaRaSH, and by anagram Ha-Sar [= "the prince" of Coucy])". In Singer, Isidore; et al. (eds.). The Jewish Encyclopedia. Vol. 11. New York: Funk & Wagnalls. p. 4. Jewish Encyclopedia bibliography: Conforte, Ḳore ha-Dorot, p. 18a; Gross, Gallia Judaica, pp. 554-556; Michael, Heiman Joseph, Or ha-Ḥayyim, No. 1230; Neubauer, in Geiger's Jüd. Zeit. ix. 217; Zunz, Z. G. p. 204.) (According to a different tradition, the term "Count (or Prince) of Coucy" refers to his brother-in-law, Rabbi Moses ben Jacob of Coucy).

He was a descendant of Rabbi Joseph ben Samuel Bonfils and a nephew of Rabbi Judah of Corbeil.

He lived in Coucy. His title "the Count" has led to legends about his being appointed as the count of the city. These legends were popularised by writers such as Marcus Lehmann and Micha Josef Berdyczewski. (Note: See Berdyczewski, השר מקוצי, in: "ממקור ישראל".) However the simple origin of this title is due to the acronym of his name in Hebrew, HaRaSH (HaRav Rabbenu SHimshon), which was subsequently converted into its anagram, HaSar (Hebrew: השר), meaning the Count, or Prince.

Samson was a student of Isaac ben Samuel and a brother-in-law of Rabbi Moses ben Jacob of Coucy, who often quotes him in his Sefer Mitzvot Gadol. One of his students was Rabbi Isaac ben Moses of Vienna.

Many of Samson's halakhic decisions are mentioned in the rabbinical works Tosafot, Or Zarua, Sefer Mitzvot Gadol, Orḥot Ḥayyim, and Pisḳe Reḳanati.

Rabbi Samson's personal seal is currently on display in the British Museum.
