= Samuel ben Solomon of Falaise =

Twelfth-century French rabbi

Samuel ben Solomon of Falaise was a French rabbi, a tosafist of the twelfth and thirteenth centuries. His French name was Sir Morel, by which he is often designated in rabbinical literature. "Kadesh Urchatz", the now ubiquitous poem at the beginning of the traditional Haggadah, is attributed to him.

He was a pupil of Judah Sir Leon of Paris and of Isaac ben Abraham of Sens. In 1240 he took part in the renowned controversy instigated by the baptized Jew Nicholas Donin.

Samuel was the author of the following works:

- Tosafot to several Talmudical treatises, among which those to the 'Abodah Zarah were published, together with the text, according to the redaction of his disciple Perez ben Elijah
- A commentary, no longer in existence, on the laws concerning Passover composed in verse by Joseph Ṭob 'Elem, quoted by Isaac ben Moses of Vienna (Or Zarua, ii. 114)
- Ritual decisions, frequently cited by Meir of Rothenburg, Mordechai ben Hillel, and other rabbinical authorities of that time.
