= Elijah of Paris =

12th century French rabbi

- Era: Medieval
- Children: Rabbi Meir
- Father: Rabbi Yehuda

Rabbi Elijah of Paris (12th century. Also called Rabbi Eliyahu HaTzarfati and Rabbeinu HaTishbi Hebrew: אליהו מפריז) was one of the early Ba'alei Tosafot in France. He lived in Paris and taught Torah there during the times of Rabbeinu Tam and Rashbam.

== Contemporaries and students ==
Rabbi Eliyahu's father was Rabbi Yehuda, and his son was Rabbi Meir.

Ephraim Urbach wrote that in Paris, Rabbi Eliyahu was a colleague of Rabbi Yom Tov bar Yehudah of Paris, son of the Judah ben Nathan, and perhaps they both served together on the Paris Beth din. Towards the end of his life, Rabbeinu Haim Kohen, a student of Rabbeinu Tam, lived in Paris, and Rabbi Eliyahu would ask him about Rabbeinu Tam's opinions.

Among his students were Rabbi Moses ben Abraham of Pontoise and likely also the Isaac ben Abraham of Dampierre, who later became one of the great sages of the next generation.

Rabbi Eliyahu was renowned for his piety and kabbalistic knowledge. An anonymous treatise describes how he called up the spirit of a young man who died suddenly so his father could speak his final words to him.

Eliezer ben Nathan called Rabbi Eliyahu, "My companion, and my familiar friend," (Psalms 55:14). And Rabbi Meshullam of Milano wrote about him "The Temple courtyard is never locked for any man in Israel who was equal to him in humility or fear of sin," (based on Eduyot 5:6).

== Rulings ==
Rabbi Eliyahu ruled that if he has no money, a husband must hire himself out to support his wife.

He would tie Tzitzit to his bedsheets.

A legend, cited in Seder HaDoroth describes an incident when Elijah was giving a lesson to a group of Tosafists, and they referred to the dispute between Rabbi Eliyahu and Rabbeinu Tam about whether the tefillin knot must be retied every day or not. They asked the deceased Rabbi Eliyahu to descend and give his ruling, but he was unable because he was offering sacrifices in Heaven. Instead, Moses came and said the law was in accordance with Rabbi Eliyahu's opinion, that tefillin must be tied anew each day.

== Works ==
His interpretations and responses are brought in Tosafot to many tractates, as well as in Machzor Vitry, by Simhah ben Samuel of Vitry, Sefer HaItur by Isaac ben Abba Mari, Sefer Yereim by Eliezer ben Samuel, Sefer HaRokeach by Eleazar of Worms, Sefer HaManhig by Abraham ben Nathan, Sefer HaRa'avan by Eliezer ben Nathan, Sefer Ra'avyah by Eliezer ben Joel HaLevi, Responsa of Meir of Rothenburg, and in the Mordechai.

In addition to his halachic rulings and responses, Rabbi Eliyahu also composed Piyyutim. including two for Shavuot, "Ometz Yom HaBikkurim" and "Berov Am Azuzecha."
