= Aliyah of the Tosafists =

13th-century migration of Jewish scholars

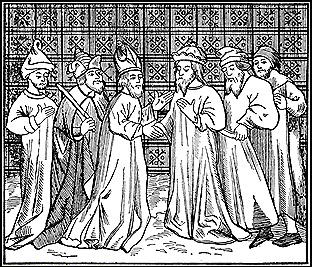
Illustration of 13th century French rabbis.

The Aliyah of the Tosafists, often called the "Aliyah of the Three Hundred Rabbis," refers to the migration of Jewish scholars from France and England to the land of Israel during the early 13th century. The migration was driven by both religious yearning and the desire to fulfill agricultural commandments specific to the Land of Israel.

== Historical context and waves of migration ==
Scholars generally divide the 13th-century Tosafist migration into two primary waves, a first wave in 1209–1210 originating primarily from Southern France (Provence), and a second wave in 1211 originating from Northern France and England. This wave followed at least two distinct routes: one group traveled directly to the Levant, while another traveled via Egypt. An encounter in Alexandria with this second group is recorded in a letter dating to September 1212, stating: "there arrived here seven of the rabbis [of France], all great scholars, accompanied by one hundred souls, men, women, and children, all in need of eating bread, as if we had not enough beggars of our own here in town".

This migration occurred in the wake of Saladin's conquest of Jerusalem in 1187. While the transition from Crusader to Ayyubid rule generally improved the quality of life for Jewish residents, the region remained politically unstable, and settlements such as Akko (Acre) faced significant economic and physical challenges.

Some descendants of the migrants remained, forming a Jewish community in Acre, while others returned to France due to the difficult living conditions in the land.

== Primary historical accounts ==
The presence of these scholars is well-documented in contemporary 13th-century sources:

During his visit to Jerusalem in 1216, the poet and traveler Judah al-Harizi reported meeting several French scholars, including the Tosafist Joseph of Clisson and his brother Meir.

Writing in 1235, Abraham Maimonides mentions a contingent of "great French scholars" who passed through Egypt on their way to Israel. He specifically identifies Rabbi Joseph and refers to the renowned Samson of Sens, noting that while Samson was known to be in Acre, they had not met personally as Samson did not travel through Egypt.

Finally, a later historiographical work in Shevet Yehudah provides the most famous (though debated) statistic regarding the migration:

In the year 4971 (1211 C.E.), God inspired the Rabbis of France and England to go to Jerusalem. They numbered more than three hundred and were accorded great honor by the king. They built for themselves synagogues and houses of study.

== Motivations and religious significance ==
The primary driver for the Tosafists' migration was the practical application of Jewish law. By settling in the Land of Israel, these scholars sought the opportunity to practice agricultural precepts that cannot be observed in the Diaspora. These scholars included: Samson of Sens, author of a foundational commentary on Seder Zeraim (relating to agriculture); Baruch ben Isaac of Worms, author of Sefer HaTerumah, which includes extensive rulings on the laws of Challah and other land-based commandments; and Moses Taku, a German Tosafist who remained strict in fulfilling the tithes and priestly gifts even on small market purchases.

=== Philosophical and halakhic debate ===
The migration saw some controversy among the Tosafists. Many viewed dwelling in the Land as a supreme virtue, citing Talmudic precedents such as Rabbi Abba kissing the stones of Acre. Meir of Rothenburg, for instance, argued it was worthy to immigrate to the Land of Israel despite the dangerous travel and difficult living conditions there. He even ruled that a child could immigrate there against the wishes of his parents. Others, however, pointed to the severe economic and physical hardships of the era, as well as the extreme difficulty of punctiliously observing the complex agricultural laws, as reasons to remain in Europe.
