= Samson ben Zadok =

Rabbi (died 1312)

Samson ben Ẓadok (Hebrew: שמשון בן צדוק) (died 1312) was a rabbi and author of Sefer Tashbeẓ (also spelled Tashbaẓ). He was a student of Rabbi Meir of Rothenburg and served his teacher while the latter was imprisoned for seven years at Ensisheim.

His work, Sefer Tashbeẓ, consists of teachings, customs, and rituals of Rabbi Meir of Rothenburg, taught to Rabbi Samson by Rabbi Meir during his time in prison. The work contains glosses by Rabbi Peretz ben Elijah.
