= Moses Taku =

Rabbi, 13th-century Tosafist from Bohemia

Moshe ben Ḥasdai Taku (Hebrew: משה בן חסדאי תאקו, fl. 1250–1290 CE) was a 13th-century Tosafist from Tachov, Bohemia. The name Taku is a variant of Tachau, Bohemia, now Tachov, Czech Republic. Despite his own seemingly mystical orientation, Rabbi Taku is controversially known to have been an opponent of both the esoteric theology of the Ashkenazi Hasidim, particularly the Kalonymos family, i.e. followers of Judah ben Samuel of Regensburg) and the philosophical orientation of rabbinic rationalists such as Saadia Gaon, Maimonides, Abraham ibn Ezra, et al. He believed that both trends were a deviant departure from traditional Judaism, which he understood to espouse a literal perspective of both the biblical narrative, and the aggadata of the Sages. His opposition to all theological speculation earned him, in the opinion of Gershom Scholem, the title of one of the two truly reactionary Jewish writers of the Middle Ages, the other being Joseph Ashkenazi.

== Travel to the Land of Israel ==
He went to the Land of Israel sometime in his lifetime. There, he is quoted as saying:

With thanks to the Almighty, we have been privileged to come to the Land and to fulfill in it the precepts of tithing and giving priestly gifts every day at all times, even from the small amounts of vegetables bought at the market. Even though there are some authorities who are lenient in this matter, we are strict about it.

== Controversial views ==
Taku is often cited as contradicting Maimonides’ Third Principle of Faith for insisting that God can be corporeally manifest and that to maintain otherwise is heretical. For Taku such a denial would be an infringement on God’s omnipotence and that accordingly all anthropomorphic allusions to God in the Hebrew Bible are to be taken literally. However, Joseph Dan, an Israeli scholar of Jewish mysticism, takes issue with this widely held view of Taku's position and espouses a more nuanced depiction:

Taku insists on the literal acceptance of the prophets' descriptions of their visions as well as the anthropomorphic references to God in talmudic-midrashic literature. He does not do so because of his belief in the literal veracity of these descriptions; he only insists that they represent the maximum that can be conveyed concerning God's essence and appearance, and that any further inquiry cannot lead to valid conclusions. God chose to reveal to us in the scriptures whatever is found in them: man should be satisfied with that, and ask no more questions. It is not that Rabbi Moses Taku believed in an anthropomorphic God; most probably, he did not.

== Writings ==
The Ketav Tamim (כתב תמים) is the principal text from which we know of Taku’s thought. It was composed around 1220, and is largely contentious. It serves as both an attack on the theologians of his day who espoused non-literal understandings of aggada, and as a means to attempt to demonstrate the validity of corporealism by citing proof texts from the Bible and the Talmud. Taku states that three theological catastrophes have occurred in Jewish history, each of which produced its school of heresy - Christianity, spearheaded by Jesus; Karaite Judaism, spearheaded by Anan ben David; and the opinions expressed by Saadia Gaon in his Beliefs and Opinions and his commentary on the Sefer Yezirah. Though the complete work is not known to have survived to this day, several major sections have endured and were first published in 1860, in Vienna.

== See also ==
- Tosafists
- Maimonidean Controversy
- Medieval Jewish Philosophy
- Heresy in Orthodox Judaism
