= Great Academy of Paris =

The Great Academy of Paris (Midrash HaGadol d'Paris) was a 13th-century Talmudic academy in Acre, established by Rabbi Jehiel of Paris.

== History ==
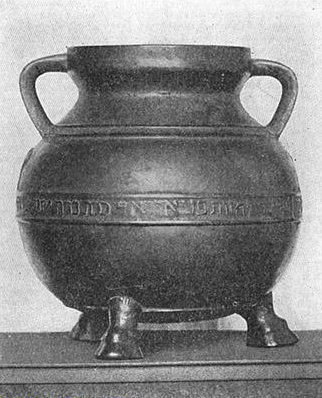
The Bodleian Bowl may have been used by Rabbi Jehiel to collect funds for the academy in Acre.

In around 1258, Rabbi Jehiel of Paris immigrated to the Kingdom of Jerusalem from Northern France with several hundred students, his son Joseph following soon later. The group settled in the Crusader stronghold of Acre, where Rabbi Jehiel founded a Talmudic academy which he named the Great Academy of Paris, after the original institution he had headed in Paris. The academy intended to continue the learning traditions of the Tosafists of Northern France.

One report suggests that there were 300 students learning at the academy, although this may have included members of the local community, who devoted time for daily study. The renown of the new academy of the "Sages of Acre" was so great that Rabbi Shlomo ben Adret wrote in 1280: 'It is a custom among the sages of the Holy Land and of Babylon that if a question should be asked, nobody answers but they say: "Let us be guided by the Sages of Acre."' Acre subsequently became a centre of religious authority for Middle Eastern Jews and the rulings of its rabbinical court were accepted by the communities of Palestine, Syria and Egypt. Its scholars were instrumental in preserving the communication network between the Jewish diaspora and Palestinian Jewry.

It is probable that the Jews of Acre could not sustain the institution alone and that emissaries were sent to Europe to solicit funding. One such envoy, "Rabbi Jacob, the Messenger of the Yeshiva of Acre" (Yaakov haShaliach; c. 1258–1270), carried an "exhortatory treatise" which included an itinerary of the Holy Land listing the tombs and gravesites of biblical figures and talmudic sages – possibly to be used as a fundraising aid.
