= Eliezer of Touques =

French tosafist of the 13th century

Eliezer (ben Solomon) of Touques (רבינו אליעזר מטוך) was a French tosafist, who lived at Touques in the second half of the thirteenth century. He abridged the tosafot of Samson of Sens, Samuel of Évreux, and many others, and added thereto marginal notes of his own, entitled "Gilyon Tosafot," or "Tosafot Gillayon". This abridgment, together with the notes, after undergoing many alterations and receiving several additions from later authorities, was called Tosafot Ṭuk; it forms the foundation of the Tosafot now printed with the Talmud.

Gershon Soncino, who printed Eliezer's tosafot for the first time, says in the preface to Ḳimḥi's Miklol edited by him (Constantinople, 1532–34) that he collected them in various places in France, especially in Chambéry, Savoy. Eliezer was also the author of a commentary on the Pentateuch, mentioned in a list of works appended to the manuscript of Ibn Janaḥ's Sefer ha-Riḳmah, now in the Bibliothèque Nationale, Paris (No. 1216).

== Jewish Encyclopedia bibliography ==
- Azulai, Shem ha-Gedolim, ii., s.v. תוספות;
- Zunz, Z. G. p. 39;
- Gross, Heinrich (1897). Gallia Judaica : dictionnaire géographique de la France d'après les sources rabbiniques (in French). Paris: Leopold Cerf., p. 209
- Rabbinowicz, Ma'amar 'al Hadfasat ha-Talmud, p. 23, Munich, 1877;
- Michael, Heimann Joseph, (1891) Or ha-Ḥayyim, Frankfort-on-the-Main (in Hebrew) No. 424.
