= Isaac ben Moses of Vienna =

13th century Austrian rabbi

Isaac ben Moses

Personal life
- Born: c. 1200 probably Bohemia
- Died: c. 1270 Vienna, Austria

Religious life
- Religion: Judaism

Isaac ben Moses of Vienna, also called Isaac Or Zarua or the Riaz, is considered to be one of the prominent rabbis of the Middle Ages. He was probably born in Bohemia and lived between 1200 and 1270. He attained his fame in Vienna and his major work, the halachic guide known as the Or Zarua a compilation of halachic decisions and legal rulings, was very popular among Ashkenazic Jewry. He was a member of the Ashkenazi Hasidim and studied under many scholars, including Eliezer ben Joel HaLevi, Judah ben Samuel of Regensburg, Samson of Coucy and Eleazar of Worms. He was among the teachers of Meir of Rothenburg.

== Life ==
In his Or Zarua, the only primary source of information on his life, he mentions two Bohemian scholars as his teachers, Jacob ha-Laban and Isaac ben Jacob ha-Lavan. Led by a thirst for Talmudic knowledge, he undertook in his youth extensive journeys to the prominent yeshivot of Germany and France. According to Heinrich Gross, he went to Regensberg first; but S.N. Bernstein conjectures that previously he stopped for a long time at Vienna, and became closely identified with the city, as he is usually quoted as "Isaac of Vienna." From among the many scholars at Regensburg he selected for his guide the mystic Judah ben Samuel.

About 1217 he went to Paris, where the great Talmudist Judah ben Isaac Messer Leon became his chief teacher. He also visited for a short time the yeshiva of Jacob ben Meir in Provins. Then he returned to Germany, and studied under the mystic Eleazar ben Judah at Worms, and, at Speyer, under Simha of Speyer, his intimate friend, and Eliezer ben Joel HaLevi, author of Abi ha-'Ezri and Abi'asaf. At Würzburg, where Meir of Rothenburg was his pupil (c. 1230), he became the rosh yeshiva. Later on, Isaac returned to Regensberg, and then settled for some time in Vienna, where he held the position of Av Beit Din and rosh yeshiva. Finally, he went to Saxony and Bohemia.

Isaac lived a long but unsteady and troubled life. He saw the law compelling Jews to wear the yellow badge put into force in France and he deplored the 1241 pogrom in Frankfurt and the extortions practised upon them by the nobles of Austria. His son-in-law was Samuel ben Shabbethai of Leipzig; his son, Chaim Eliezer, called Or Zarua, like him a scholar, carried on a comprehensive halachic correspondence, a part of which (251 responsa) was printed under the title Sefer She'elot uTeshubot (Leipzig, 1860).

== Work ==
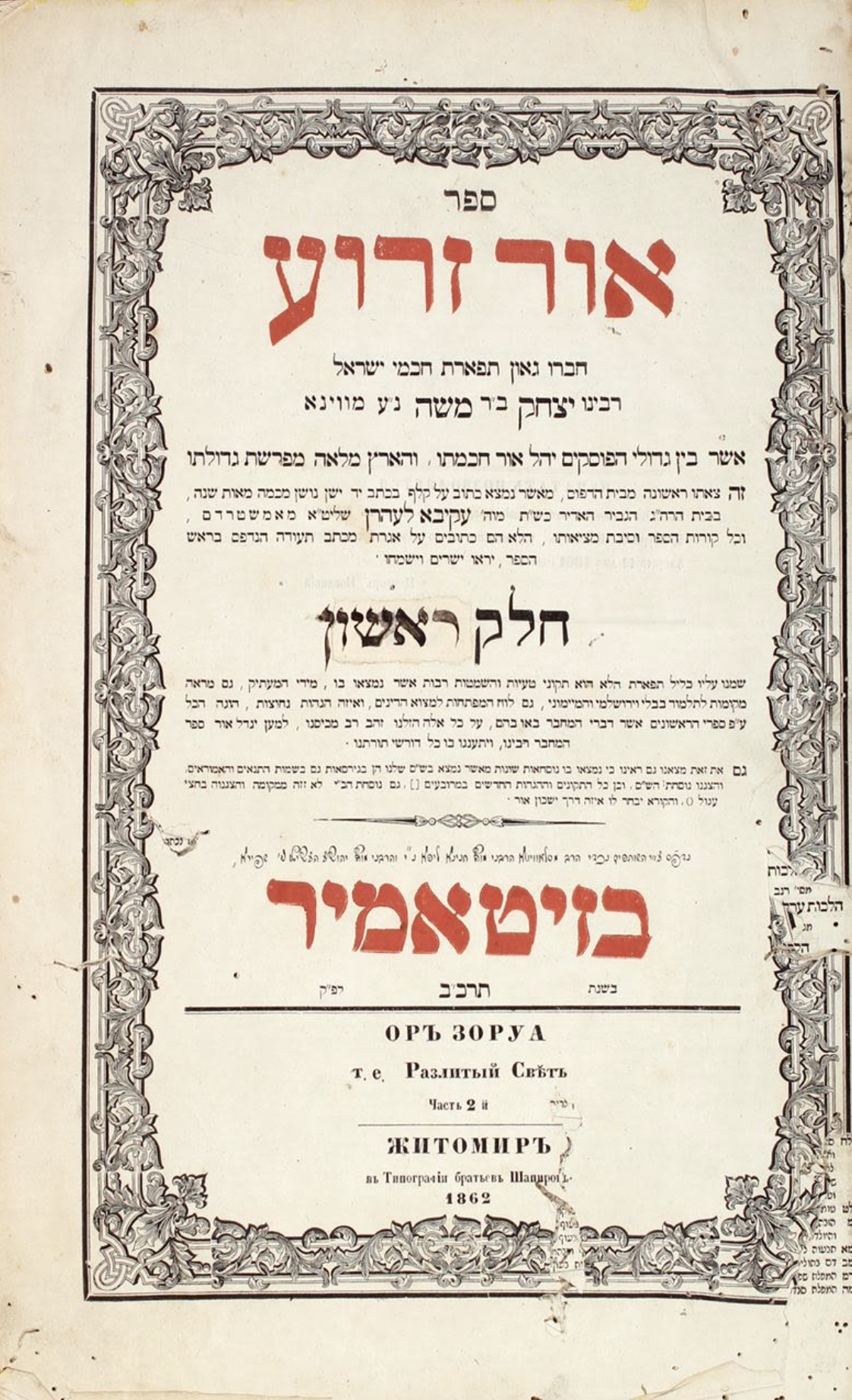
Or Zarua by Isaac of Vienna & Meir of Rothenburg c. 1260 (Zhitomir edition, 1862)

Toward the end of his life, about 1260, Isaac composed his halachic (legal) work Or Zarua. He is usually quoted as "Isaac Or Zarua." It was printed from the Amsterdam incomplete manuscript by Lipa and Höschel in Zhytomyr, 1862. Other manuscripts are at Oxford and in the Jewish Theological Seminary in New York City. In the edition of Lipa and Höschel Seder Nezikin is wanting; most of the rest of the work was afterward printed at Jerusalem by J.M. Hirschensohn.

The Or Zarua comprises the whole halachic corpus and is arranged according to the Talmudic tractates, while at the same time the halachot are kept together. The author, unlike Maimonides in his Mishneh Torah, does not confine himself to giving the halakhic decisions, but gives also the passage of the Talmud, explains the subject matter, and develops the din from it. Thus, the Or Zarua is at the same time a ritual code and a Talmudic commentary. As it contains, in addition, explanations of some passages in the Hebrew Bible, the author is also quoted as a Bible commentator.

Moreover, the book contains a part of the halachic correspondence which the author carried on with Talmudic scholars of Italy, France, and Austria. Older collections of halachic decisions which the author had gathered together during his lifetime seem also to be embodied in the work. Isaac explains unknown words in Bohemian (i. e. Czech), his mother tongue, and cites the Jerusalem Talmud, to which he ascribes great authority in halachic decisions. The work is introduced by a treatise couched in words to whose meanings mystical significance is attached. It is an imitation of the Alphabet of Akiba ben Joseph and was composed at the order of Isaac's teacher Eleazar ben Judah of Worms. Isaac's son Chaim Eliezer arranged a compendium of this work which exists in several manuscripts.

The Or Zarua succeeded in displacing all the older ritual works. It is very important also for the cultural history of the German Jews in the Middle Ages.

According to Gross, Isaac's chief importance rests upon the fact that he introduced among the Jewish communities in Slavic lands the study of the Talmud from France and the west of Germany.

Isaac was of a mild and peace-loving character and it was for this reason, perhaps, that he did not participate in the struggle against the study of secular sciences, though an incorrect ritual decision would rouse him to indignant energy. He carried on a controversy with several rabbis concerning the legal status of a betrothed girl who had been forced by circumstances to adopt Christianity and had afterward returned to Judaism. His anxiety about correct observance led him to counsel the more difficult rather than the easier ritual practise. His mystical studies account for his belief in miracles. He was held in high regard by his pupils, and, like other teachers of the time, was given the title HaKadosh "the Holy" by the Asher ben Jehiel. His contemporary Isaiah di Trani described him as "the wonder of the age".

== Bibliography from Jewish Encyclopedia article ==
- S. N. Bernstein, in Ha-Ẓefirah, 1902, Nos. 229, 231, 232;
- Heinrich Grätz, Gesch. vii.101;
- Gross, in Monatsschrift, 1871, pp. 248 et seq.;
- Moritz Güdemann, Gesch. i.114, 152, 153;
- Leopold Zunz, Z.G. Index;
  - idem, in Moritz Steinschneider, Hebr. Bibl. 1865, pp. 1 et seq.;
  - idem, G.S. iii.128 et seq.;
- Weiss, Dor, v.73
