= Joseph ben Samuel Bonfils =

Joseph ben Samuel Bonfils was a French rabbi, Talmudist, Bible commentator, and payyetan (author of piyyutim) of the mid-eleventh century. He is also known by the Hebrew name Yosef Tov Elem or “Tobelem” (יוסף טוב עלם), a Hebrew translation from the French name "Bonfils."

Of his life nothing is known but that he came from Narbonne, and was rabbi of Limoges in the province of Anjou.

Samson of Coucy was one of his descendants.

Joseph Bonfils must not be confused, as he is by Azulai, with another scholar of the same name, who lived in 1200 and corresponded with Simḥah of Speyer.

== Teachings ==
The activity of Bonfils was many-sided. A number of his decisions which earned the high esteem of his contemporaries and of posterity are to be found in "The Mordechai." Among his numerous legal decisions one deserving mention is that pronouncing money won in play an illegal possession, and compelling the winner to return it. Another important decision ordered a lighter tax on the Jewish farmer than on the merchant, for the reason that agriculture was less profitable than trade. Little is known of the collections of his responsa mentioned in Moses Alashkar's Responsa, or of his collection of the responsa of the Geonim. His Bible commentaries, mentioned by some of the old writers, have also disappeared.

Bonfils devoted himself to restoring the correct texts of older works, especially the Masorah—works of the Geonim. His critical notes upon Judah's Halakot Gedolot and the Seder Tannaim ve-Amoraim show marked departures from the current text.

The ability and activity of Bonfils are best judged from his contributions to the poetry of the synagogue. No less than 62 of his piyyuṭim occupying prominent places in the French, German, and Polish liturgies. These compositions show that he was more than an ordinary poet among the Franco-German payyeṭanim of his time. Few equaled him in beauty of imagery and facility of expression. The poetry of the synagogue is furthermore deeply indebted to Bonfils for the introduction of the piyyuṭim into the prayers, in face of great opposition. Of his many piyyuṭim, the best-known is that written for "Shabbat HaGadol" (the Sabbath before Passover), beginning with the words "Elohei haruchot," and containing the rules for the Passover-cleaning ("bi'ur") and the narrative service for the evening. Its concluding lines, beginning with "Hasal seder pesach", appear near the end of the Passover Haggadah.

Bonfils' importance is shown by the fact that the Tosafists in many places occupy themselves with the explanation of obscure points in this piyyuṭ. Samuel ben Solomon of Falaise, a French Tosafist, composed a commentary upon it.
