= Eliezer of Toul =

13th-century French Tosafist

Eliezer of Toul (d. before 1234) was a 13th-century French Tosafist.

Born in Toul, France, in his early years, he studied under Isaac ben Samuel, later moving to Boppard, Germany where he tutored Hizkiyyahu ben Reuven, a wealthy Jewish merchant. Hizkiyyahu later refused to pay Eliezer, and the matter become infamous amongst local rabbis. Eliezer's talmudic discussions appear in the works of later posekim, such as Zedekiah ben Abraham Anaw who mentions Eliezer's commentaries on the Talmudic tractate, Beitza, although these have not survived.
