= Peretz ben Elijah =

French tosafist

Perez ben Elijah of Corbeil (died about 1295) was a French tosafist, son of the Talmudist Elijah of Tours. In Talmudic literature he is designated by the abbreviations RaP (= Rabbeinu Perez), RaPaSh (= Rabbeinu Perez, may he live), and MaHaRPaSh (= our master Rabbeinu Perez, may he live).

Perez's teachers included Jehiel of Paris, Jacob of Chinon and Samuel of Evreux. He traveled throughout Brabant, and sojourned for a time in Germany and France, where he made the acquaintance of Meir of Rothenburg. On his return home he delivered lectures on Talmudical subjects, which were attended by the most celebrated rabbis of the fourteenth century. His fame as a Talmudical authority eventually became universal, his commentaries being studied in France, Germany, and Spain. He died before 1298, probably in 1295.

Perez was the author of the following works:

1. Glosses on the Ammude ha-Golah of Isaac of Corbeil, published together with the text, Cremona, 1556.
2. Commentaries on the greater part of the Talmud. These commentaries, variously entitled "Tosafot," "Shiṭṭah," "Nimuḳim," "Ḥiddushim," "Perishah," underwent many changes introduced by Perez's numerous disciples; only the commentary on the treatise Baba Metzia has been preserved in its original redaction. Two of the commentaries, on Baba Kamma and Sanhedrin, were published by Abraham Venano at Leghorn in 1819; that on the tenth chapter of Pesahim was reproduced by Mordecai ben Hillel in his Mordekai; and many others were given by Bezaleel Ashkenazi in his Shiṭṭah Meḳubbeẓet.
3. Glosses on the collection of the ritual laws entitled Tashbaẓ of Samson ben Zadok, published together with the text, Cremona, 1556–1561. He also commented masechet Nazir.
4. Sefer Pereẓ, a Masoretic work which is no longer in existence.

== Sources ==
It has the following bibliography:

- Abraham Zacuto, Sefer Yuḥasin, ed. Filipowski, p. 233
- Azulai, Shem ha-Gedolim, ii. 149
- David Conforte, Kore ha-Dorot, p. 17
- Leopold Zunz, Z. G. p. 41
- Moritz Steinschneider, Cat. Bodl. col. 2643
- Ernest Renan-Adolf Neubauer, Les Rabbins Français, pp. 449 et seq.
- Henri Gross, Gallia Judaica, pp. 565 et seq.
