= Jacob of Chinon =

13th-century French Tosafist

Rabbi Jacob of Chinon also known as Rav Tam of Chinon (Hebrew: רב יעקב מקינון; c. 1190–1260) was a 13th-century French Tosafist from Chinon. He was a pupil of Isaac ben Abraham of Dampierre and a teacher of Perez of Corbeil. Mordechai ben Hillel mentions that Jacob wrote "Shitṭah", a commentary on the Talmudic tractate, Sanhedrin. Besides that Rabbi Jacob is known for several of his tosafot.
