= Bezalel Ashkenazi =

Rabbi and Talmudic scholar (c. 1520–1591)

Personal life
- Born: c. 1520 Land of Israel
- Died: c. 1592

Religious life
- Religion: Judaism

Bezalel ben Abraham Ashkenazi (Hebrew: בצלאל בן אברהם אשכנזי) (c. 1520 – c. 1592) was a rabbi and talmudist who lived in Ottoman Palestine during the 16th century. He is best known as the author of the Shitah Mekubetzet, a commentary on the Talmud. (Note: The Shita Mequbetzes to Kodashim in its modern form (both the short version in the Vilna Sha"s and the longer version published separately) was composed by Solomon Adeni, a student of Ashkenazi, whose marginal annotations were its basis. All printings inaccurately attribute the work to Ashkenazi himself.) Among his disciples were Isaac Luria and Solomon Adeni.

== Biography ==
Ashkenazi was one of the leading Eastern Talmudists and rabbis of his day. He was probably born in the indigenous Land of Israel. Descended from a family of German scholars, most of his life was spent in Egypt Eyalet, where he received his Talmudic education from David ben Solomon ibn Abi Zimra and Israel ben Meir di Curiel. During the lifetime of his teachers, Ashkenazi was regarded as one of the highest authorities in the Orient, and counted Isaac Luria and Solomon Adeni among his pupils. In Egypt his reputation was such that he could abrogate the dignity of the nagid, which had existed for centuries and had gradually deteriorated into an arbitrary aristocratic privilege. When, in 1587, a dispute occurred in Jerusalem over the extent to which scholars not engaged in business should contribute to the taxes paid by the Jewish community to the pasha, Ashkenazi, together with several other rabbis, took the stand that Jewish scholars, being usually impelled by love alone to emigrate to the Land of Israel, and being scarcely able to support themselves, should be relieved from all taxes.

In the same year, Ashkenazi travelled to the Land of Israel, settling in Jerusalem, where he was recognized as important by both Sephardic and Ashkenazi communities. The conditions in Jerusalem were at this time very critical; and it was mainly due to Ashkenazi's influence that the congregations of the city were not dissolved. German Jews, who normally did not recognize the jurisdiction of the Sephardim and who, being largely scholars, refused to pay the Jews' tax, nevertheless recognized Ashkenazi's authority. However this arrangement between the Ashkenazim and the Sephardim seems to have been solely due to the personal influence of Ashkenazi; as it ended immediately after his death.

== Works ==
=== Shitah Mekubezet ===
Ashkenazi is known principally as the author of Shitah Mekubezet (Hebrew: שיטה מקובצת, Gathered Interpretation). This work, as its title indicates, (Note: This title was chosen by the Vilna printers. In Ashkenazi and Adeni's time, the work was generally known as "the glosses" etc. Earlier printers used Asifat Zeqenim, and "Collection of Elders." Adeni himself refers to it as the Binyan Shlomo l'-Chokhmas Betzalel, "Solomon's Construction of Betzalel's Wisdom", in his Melekhet Shlomo.) is a collection of glosses on the greater part of the Talmud, in the style of the Tosafot, including much original and foreign material. The great value of the Shitah lies principally in the fact that it contains numerous excerpts from Talmudic commentaries which have not otherwise been preserved.

Ashkenazi himself wrote only short marginal annotations in his edition of the Talmud. Solomon Adeni, his student, edited the annotations into the commentary to Kodashim as it exists today (both versions), including a vast quantity of original material.

Shitah Mekubezet contains expositions of the Talmud taken from the works of the Spaniards Nahmanides, ben Adret, and Yom-Tov of Seville, and from those of the Frenchmen Abraham ben David, Baruch ben Samuel, Isaac of Chinon, etc. The study of the Shitah is particularly valuable for understanding the Tosafists, because the work contains some of the older and unedited Tosafot; besides, glosses of Asher ben Jehiel and of the disciples of Perez ben Elijah are partly contained in it.

=== Other works ===
Ashkenazi is also the author of a collection of responsa, which appeared after his death (Venice, 1595).

His Methodology of the Talmud, and his marginal notes to the Jerusalem Talmud, which were still extant at the time of Chaim Joseph David Azulai, are preserved in manuscript at Jerusalem.
