= Moses of Évreux =

13th century French Tosafist

Moses of Évreux (רבי משה מאיוורא) was a French tosafist, one of three brothers, and author of a siddur, who flourished at Évreux in Normandy in the first half of the thirteenth century. His father was Shneur of Évreux who left behind three children each of them outstanding scholars: Moses of Évreux, Samuel of Évreux and Isaac of Évreux. Moses was the oldest brother and teacher of his younger brothers. They were collectively called "the sages of Évreux".

Heinrich Gross identifies him with Moses ben Shneor, the teacher of the author of Sefer ha-Gan, a commentary on the Pentateuch. Others have generally supposed to him to be the son of Yom-Ṭov, referred to in Elijah Mizraḥi's responsa (No. 82).

The Tosafot of Évreux, much used by tosafists, was his work. He is quoted in the tosafot on Berakhot 46b, and his name is frequently written. His tosafot are called also Shiṭṭah of Évreux. Moses wrote his tosafot on the margin of a copy of Isaac Alfasi, whose authority he invoked.

The heads of the Tosafist academy at Evreux, Moses and Samuel Ben Shneur (d.c.1250) believed that written texts such as those of the Talmud and its commentaries are "the teachers of men" and one could open a study hall even in the same locale as one's teacher and could contradict one's teacher through sharp interpretation of law.
