= Baruch ben Isaac =

Baruch ben Isaac, called usually from Worms or from France (born c. 1140, died 1211) was a French halakhist and Talmudist. He is not to be identified with another Baruch ben Isaac (fl. 1200), a Tosafist and codifier who was born at Worms, but lived at Regensburg, (he is sometimes called after the one and sometimes after the other city).

A pupil of the great Tosafist Isaac ben Samuel of Dampierre, Baruch wrote Tosafot to several treatises (e.g., Nashim, Nazir, Shabbat, Hullin); nearly all those extant on the tractate Zevahim are his. Abraham Epstein believes that the commentary on the Sifra contained in the Munich MS. No. 59 is the work of this Baruch. He is the author also of the legal compendium, Sefer haTerumah (Book of the Heave-Offering, Venice, 1523; Zolkiev, 1811), written c. 1204, containing the ordinances concerning slaughtering, permitted and forbidden food, the Sabbath, tefillin, etc. The book is one of the most important German codes, and was highly valued by contemporaries and successors. It is noteworthy by reason of the author's attempt to facilitate its use by presenting a synopsis of its contents, the first attempt at making a practical ritual codex in Germany.
