= Corbeil-Cerf =

- Commune
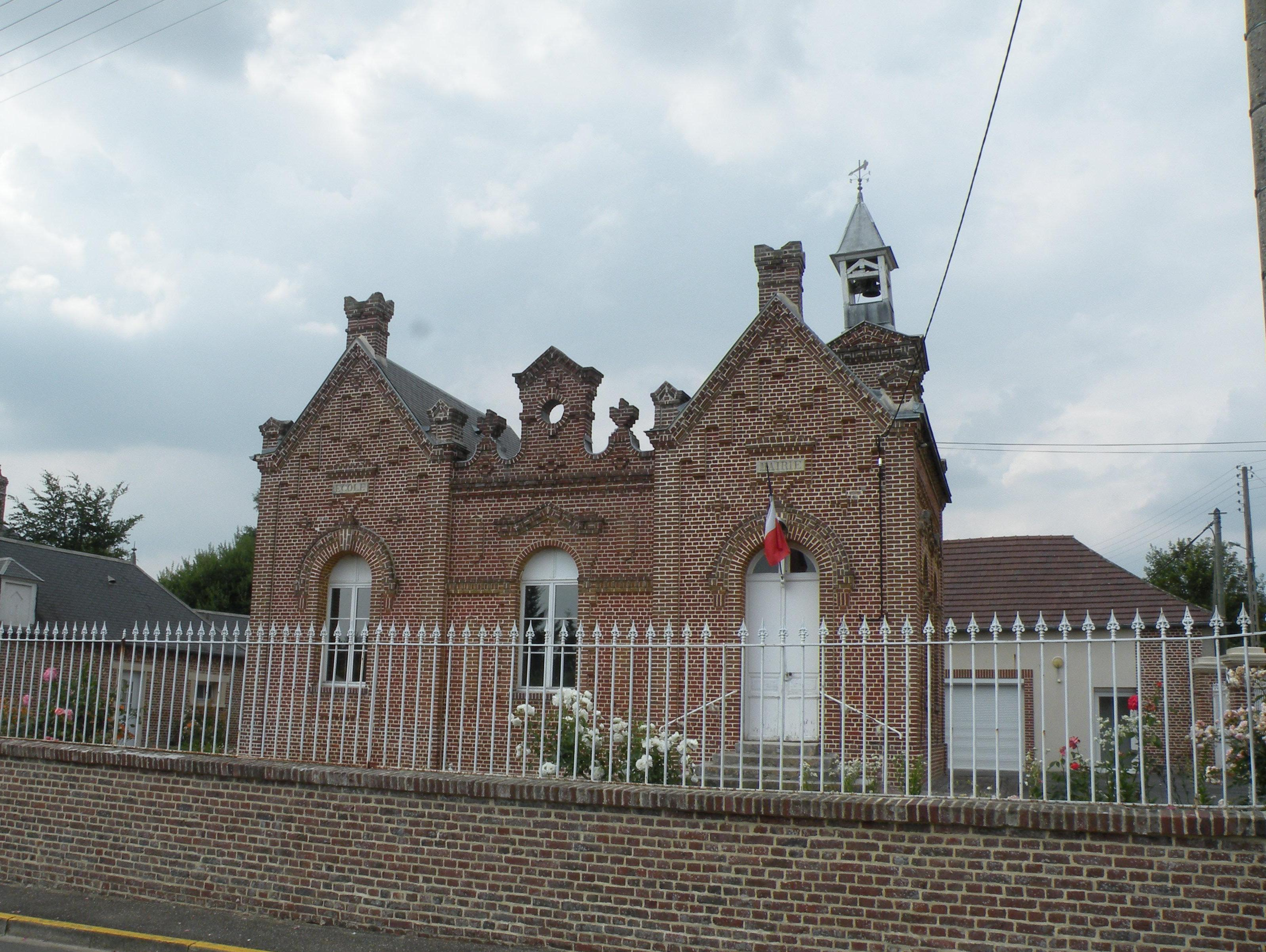
- The town hall in Corbeil-Cerf

- Coat of arms
- Location of Corbeil-Cerf
- Location within France Location within Hauts-de-France
- Coordinates: 49°16′50″N 2°06′16″E
- Country: France
- Region: Hauts-de-France
- Department: Oise
- Arrondissement: Beauvais
- Canton: Chaumont-en-Vexin
- Intercommunality: Sablons

Government
  - Mayor (2020–2026): Laurent Chevallier
- Area^{1}: 3.95 km^{2} (1.53 sq mi)
- Elevation: 177 m (581 ft)
- Highest elevation: 190 m (620 ft)
- Lowest elevation: 138 m (453 ft)
- Population (2023): 357
  - Density: 90.4/km^{2} (234/sq mi)
- Time zone: UTC+01:00 (CET)
  - Summer (DST): UTC+02:00 (CEST)
- INSEE/Postal code: 60162 /60110
- ^{1} French Land Register data, which excludes lakes, ponds, glaciers > 1 km^{2} (0.386 sq mi or 247 acres) and river estuaries.

Corbeil-Cerf is a commune in the Oise department in northern France.

== See also ==
- Communes of the Oise department
