= Eliezer ben Joel HaLevi =

12th century German Rabbinic scholar

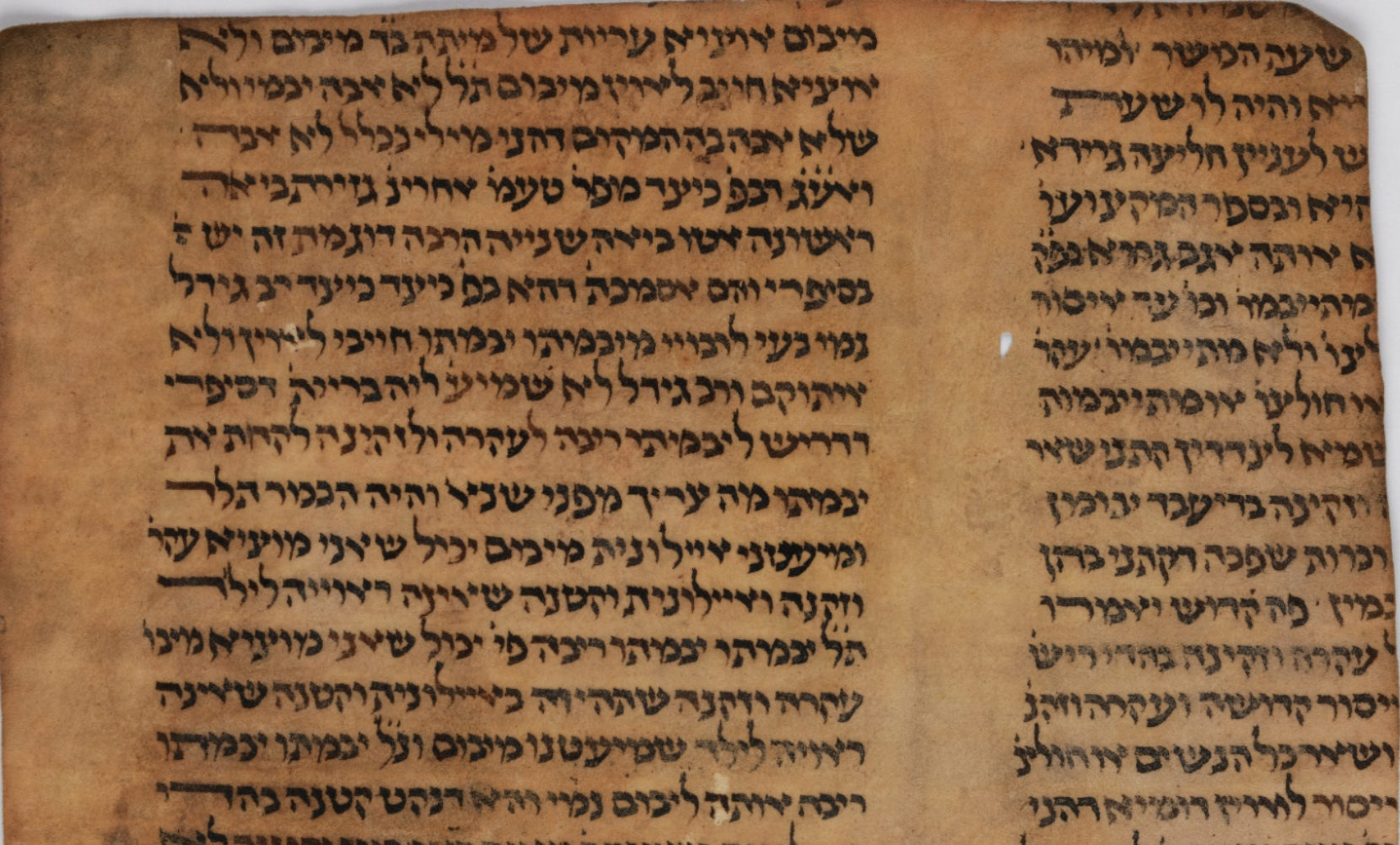
- Leaf of a manuscript of the sayings of Rav'Yah (1300)

Personal life
- Born: c. 1140 Bonn, Holy Roman Empire
- Died: c. 1225 (Possibly in Cologne)
- Parent: R. Joel ha-Levi of Bonn

Religious life
- Religion: Judaism

Eliezer ben Yoel HaLevi of Bonn (Hebrew acronym ראבי״ה Rav'Yah; 1140–1225 (Note: To be more precise, it is only known that he died after 1220.)) was a Rabbinic scholar in Germany. He is perhaps best remembered for reintroducing the principle of majority decision making (elsewhere known as Democracy) into the procedure of Rabbinic courts. Eliezer of Bonn's defense of the principle of majority rule shows up in the writings of Meir of Rothenburg, and in a much more elaborate and diffused form in a book of his collected sayings.

Meir of Rothenburg's epitome of Eliezer's defense of the principle of majority rule on questions of community legal practices, as well contextual clues scattered elsewhere throughout the literature, indicate that this principle was reintroduced at the Takkanot SHUM: The Jewish synods held at Speyer, Worms and Mainz in the midst of their persecution during the Crusades. There Eliezer of Bonn presided alongside his friend and companion Eleazar of Worms, a mystical teacher from the Kalonymid Dynasty, and other members of the Jewish community in Western Europe.

His maternal grandfather was Eliezer ben Nathan (Ra'avan). Eliezer studied under his father Joel haLevi of Bonn, as well as under Judah HeHasid, Eliezer of Metz, Judah ben Kalonymus of Mainz (the father of Eleazar of Worms) and many others. He accepted the Rabbinate of Cologne in 1200. His brother died a martyr's death in 1216, after which he is said to have gone temporarily blind and had to dictate his rulings, notes and responsa to his students because he could no longer see the words on the page before him. Eliezer's mourning for him was so great that his vision was impaired and he was compelled to dictate his novellae to his students.

He had a significant influence on Asher ben Jehiel (the ROSH). As a Rishon, he was prominent amongst the Tosafists of the middle-ages, and was a signatory to the Takkanot Shum. In the course of his long life he wandered from place to place: Bonn, Worms, Würzburg, Mainz, Cologne, Regensburg, and throughout France and Lombardy.

His major work, Sefer Avi HaEzri (My Father is my Help), which is more commonly known by its author's acronym as Sefer Ra'avyah (also spelled Sefer Rabiah), is a compendium of articles that he developed into a book. It contains halakhot and legal decisions.
