= Yechiel of Paris =

Jewish scholar of the 13th century

Personal life
- Born: end of the 12th century Meaux, France
- Died: c. 1268 Acre, Kingdom of Jerusalem
- Children: Moses ben Yechiel

Religious life
- Religion: Judaism

Yechiel ben Joseph of Paris or Jehiel of Paris, called Sire Vives in French (Judeo-French: שיר ויויש) and Vivus Meldensis ("Vives of Meaux") in Latin, was a major Talmudic scholar and Tosafist from northern France, father-in-law of Isaac ben Joseph of Corbeil. He was a disciple of Rabbi Judah Messer Leon, and succeeded him in 1225 as head of the Yeshiva of Paris, which then boasted some 300 students; his best known student was Meir of Rothenburg. He is the author of many Tosafot.

== Disputation of Paris ==
Yechiel of Paris is best known as the main defender of Judaism in the 1240 Disputation of Paris held at the court of Louis IX, where he argued against the convert Nicholas Donin. This was the first formal Christian–Jewish disputation held in medieval Christendom. In defence of accusations of slanderous quotes in the Talmud against the founder of Christianity, Yechiel argued that the references to Yeshu in fact refer to different individuals. Yechiel delineates them as Jesus himself another "Yeshu haNotzri", also from Nazareth (Sanhedrin 107b), and a third "Yeshu" of the boiling excrement in Gittin 47a. Berger (1998) wrote: "Whatever one thinks of the sincerity of the multiple Jesus theory, R. Yehiel found a way to neutralize some dangerous rabbinic statements, and yet the essential Ashkenazic evaluation of Jesus remains even in the text of this disputation." Yechiel's argument was followed by Nachmanides at the Disputation of Barcelona in 1263, but not by Profiat Duran at the Disputation of Tortosa in 1413–1414.

Although the disputants were believed by at least some to have successfully defended Judaism, a decree was passed for the public burning of all available manuscripts of the Talmud—and on Friday, June 17, 1244, 24 carriage loads of written works were set alight.

The arguments and the contents of the debate were published in Thorn in 1873 under the title Vikuaḥ Rabenu Yeḥiel mi Paris (Hebrew: ויכוח רבינו יחיאל מפריס).

== Disputed move to Acre ==
According to some sources, Yechiel left to the land of Israel from France, either due to rising antisemitism or to reinstate ritual sacrifices. He arrived in Outremer around 1258 and settled in Acre, then ruled by the Crusader state of the Kingdom of Jerusalem, along with his son, Messire Delicieux (מישירא דילשיש) and a large group of followers. He soon re-established the Great Academy of Paris (Midrash haGadol d'Paris) and is believed to have died there between 1265 and 1268. He was buried near Haifa, at Mount Carmel.

According to Simha Emanuel [he] however, he never emigrated and died in France, where a fragment of a funeral stone has been found bearing the inscription,

מורנו

י)יחיאל)

לגן עד

(translated: Our master Yehiel to the Paradise), which could be from Rabbi Yechiel.

== Teachings ==
He was a tosafist. His tosafot are quoted as authoritative by Peretz ben Elijah, in "Kol Bo", and in "Mordechai". He is frequently quoted also in the edited tosafot.

== See also ==
- Old Yishuv
