= Moses ben Jacob of Coucy =

13th-century French rabbi

Rabbi Moses ben Jacob of Coucy, also known as Moses Mikkotsi (Hebrew: משה בן יעקב מקוצי; Latin: Moses Kotsensis), was a French Tosafist and authority on Halakha (Jewish law). He is best known as the author of one of the earliest codifications of Halakha, the Sefer Mitzvot Gadol.

== Biography ==
Moses of Coucy lived in the first half of the thirteenth century, and is believed to have died around 1260. His name suggests he was born or raised in Coucy in Northern France. He was a descendant of a family of distinguished scholars. He was the brother-in-law of Tosafist Shimshon of Sens and Shimshon of Coucy (HaSar MiCoucy).

He studied under Judah of Paris, and Yehudah HaChasid. Following in the latter's footsteps he traveled through Provence and Spain to strengthen religiosity among the Jews and teaching them the way to serve God.

In 1240 he was one of the four rabbis who were required to defend the Talmud, in a public disputation in Paris, and it is likely that the need for a work like the Sefer Mitzvot Gadol was driven by the decrees against the Talmud which had been promulgated in France, and had led to the confiscation and burning of all Talmud manuscripts in 1242.

== Works ==
The Sefer Mitzvot Gadol (Hebrew: ספר מצוות גדול) (in English: The Great Book of Commandments; abbreviated סמ"ג "SeMaG"), completed in 1247, deals with the 365 negative commandments and the 248 positive commandments, separately discussing each of them according to the Talmud and the decisions of the Rabbis. "SeMaG" also contains much non-legal, moralistic teaching. References to the "SeMaG" are by section (positive or negative commandments) and a number for each commandment within its section.

Rabbi Moses' arrangement and presentation are heavily influenced by Maimonides' discussion of the commandments in the Sefer Hamitzvot and by his codification of the Halakha in the Mishneh Torah. However, unlike Maimonides, Rabbi Moses presents lengthy discussions of the different interpretations and legal opinions. He also makes extensive use of other codes, and particularly of the commentaries of Rashi and the Tosafot, usually favouring these Ashkenazi traditions over Maimonides.

He was also the author of Old Tosafot (תוספות ישנים) to Yoma and of some published in the collection "Sugyot HaShas" (Berlin, 1736).
