= Samuel of Évreux =

13th-century French tosafist

Samuel of Évreux (שמעואל מאברוא) was a French tosafist of the thirteenth century, the younger brother and student of Moses of Évreux, author of the tosafot of Évreux. He is identified by Gross with Samuel ben Shneor (not ben Yom-Ṭov, as given by Zunz in Z. G. p. 38), whose explanations of Nazir are cited by Solomon ben Aderet, and whose authority is invoked by Jonah Gerondi.

Samuel directed a rabbinical school at Château-Thierry, and had for disciples R. Ḥayyim (brother of Asher ben Jehiel of Toledo), R. Perez, and R. Isaac of Corbeil. He carried on a correspondence on scientific subjects (and shared R. Perez as a student) with Jehiel of Paris and with Nathaniel the Elder. Samuel's Talmudic interpretations are often quoted in the Tosafot. From the fact that the author of the tosafot to Soṭah mentions there the name of Moses of Évreux as being his brother, it is inferred that these tosafot were written by Samuel.

== Jewish Encyclopedia bibliography ==
- Heimann, Michael (1891) Or ha-Ḥayyim, Frankfurt a. M.(in Hebrew), p. 593, No. 1202;
- Gross, Heinrich (1897). Gallia Judaica : dictionnaire géographique de la France d'après les sources rabbiniques (in French). Paris: Leopold Cerf. p. 258.
