= Heinrich Gross (rabbi) =

German rabbi (1835–1910)

Heinrich Gross, written also as Henri Gross (born Szenicz, Hungarian Kingdom, now Senica, Slovakia, 6 November 1835; died 1910), was a German rabbi. He was a pupil in rabbinical literature of Judah Aszod.

After graduating from the Breslau seminary and from the University of Halle, where he received his Ph.D. in 1866; his thesis on Leibniz obtained the university prize, he was engaged as a private teacher by Baron Horace Günzburg at Paris. During a residence of two years in that city Gross, collected in the Bibliothèque Nationale the material for his work Gallia Judaica. In 1869, he went to Berlin, where he associated with Leopold Zunz, whose methods of research he admired and adopted. In 1870, he was called to the rabbinate of Gross-Strelitz, Silesia. From 1875 he was rabbi of Augsburg.

Gross's activity in the domain of literary history, especially of that of the French Jews of the Middle Ages, was extensive. His Gallia Judaica (Paris, 1897), which deals with the medieval geography and literary history of the Jews of France, became a standard work.

Gross also enriched Jewish scientific periodicals with valuable contributions. Of these the most noteworthy are:

- "Abraham ben David aus Posquières, ein Literarhistorischer Versuch," in "Monatsschrift," 1873-74
- "Zur Geschichte der Juden in Arles," ib. 1878, 1879, 1880
- "Eliezer ben Joel ha-Levi, ein Literarhistorischer Versuch," ib. 1885, 1886
- "Jehudah Sir Leon aus Paris: Analekten," in "Magazin," 1877, 1878, iv. 174, v. 179
- "Etude sur Simson ben Abraham de Sens," in "R. E. J." 1883.

Gross was also the author of "Lehrbuch der Israelitischen Religion für die Oberen Klassen der Mittelschulen."
