= Meir of Rothenburg =

German rabbi and poet (c.1215–1293)

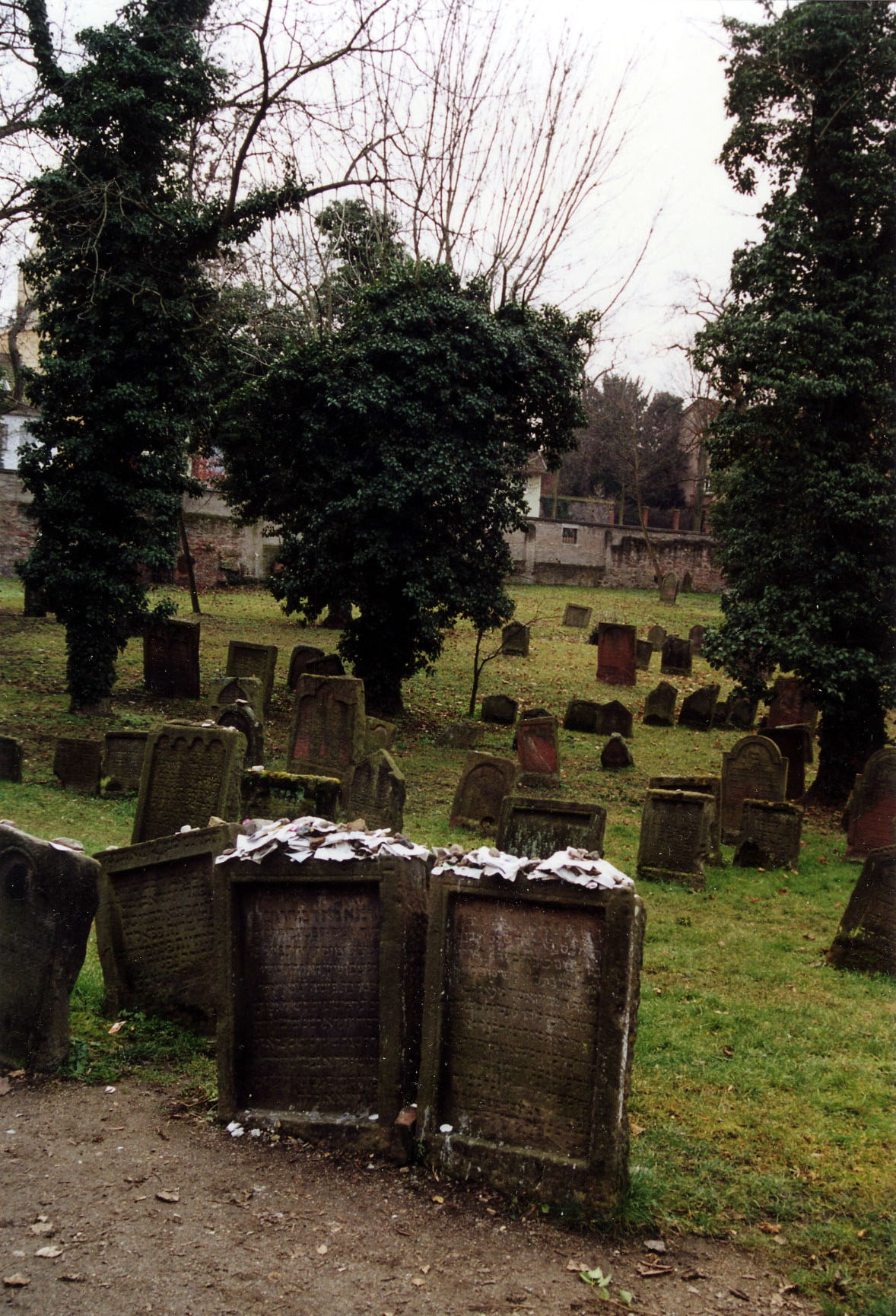
- Tombs of Meir of Rothenburg (left) and Alexander ben Salomon Wimpfen (right) in the Jewish cemetery of Worms

Personal life
- Born: c. 1215 Worms, Holy Roman Empire
- Died: 2 May 1293 Wasserburg am Inn, Bavaria

Religious life
- Religion: Judaism

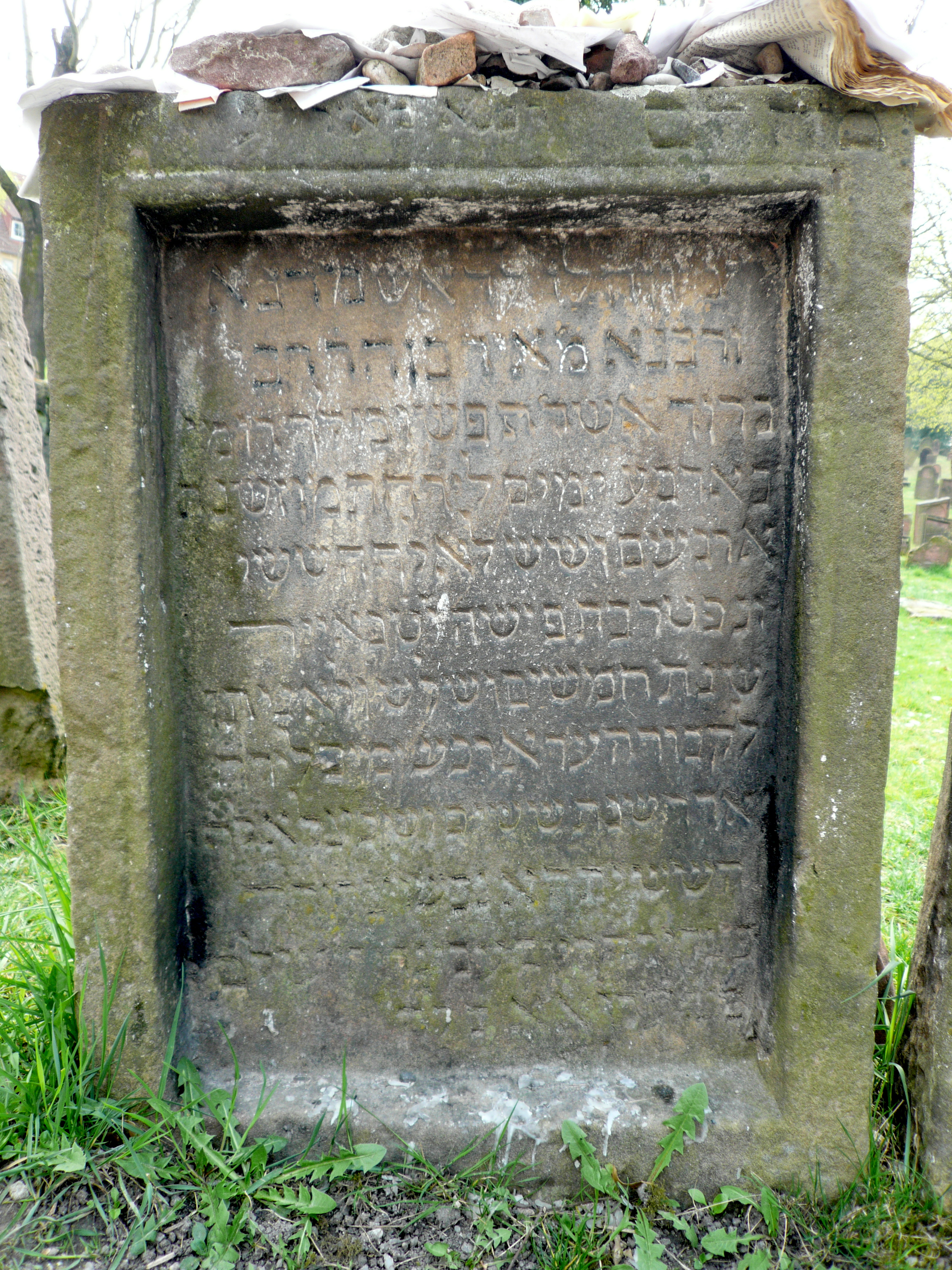

Meir of Rothenburg (c. 1215 – 2 May 1293) was a German Rabbi and poet, as well as a major contributing author of the tosafot on Rashi's commentary on the Talmud. He is also known as Meir ben Baruch (Hebrew: מאיר ב"ר ברוך), and by the Hebrew language acronym Maharam of Rothenburg ("Our Teacher, Rabbi Meir", Hebrew: מהר"ם מרוטנבורג). He was referred to by Rabbi Menachem Meiri as the "greatest Jewish leader of Zarfat" (Medieval Hebrew for France, a reference to Charlemagne's rule of Germany) alive at the time.

== Biography ==
Rabbi Meir was born between 1215 and 1220 in the Free City of Worms. His first teacher was his father, who descended from a long line of rabbis. He continued his training in Würzburg under Isaac ben Moses of Vienna and in France, where he remained until 1242, his teachers being Yechiel of Paris, Samuel ben Solomon of Falaise, and Samuel of Évreux, witnessing the burning of the Talmud on 17 June 1242, in Paris. He then settled in Rothenburg ob der Tauber, opening a yeshiva in his house. After the death of his father in 1281, he settled in Worms. In 1286, Rudolf I, King of the Romans, instituted a new political status for the Jewish community, declaring them servi camerae regis "serfs of the treasury", allowing direct royal taxation of the Jewish community. Since Rudolf did not prohibit local nobles from also taxing the Jews, the burden on the communities could be devastating.

Meir corresponded with rabbis in the Land of Israel and advocated for aliyah, taking the position it was worthy to immigrate to the Land of Israel despite the dangerous travel and difficult living conditions there. He even ruled that a child could immigrate there against the wishes of his parents.

Along with many others, Meir left Germany with family and followers, likely intending to migrate to the Land of Israel. Along the way, however, he was captured in the mountains of Lombardy, having been recognized by a baptized Jew named Kneppe, and imprisoned in a fortress near Ensisheim in Alsace. Tradition has it that a large ransom of 23,000 marks silver was raised for him by Asher ben Jehiel, but Rabbi Meir refused it for fear of encouraging the imprisonment of other rabbis. He ruled on his own abduction in light of Talmudic law.

Meir died in prison after seven years. Fourteen years after his death, a ransom was paid for his body by Alexander ben Salomon Wimpfen, who was subsequently laid to rest beside him in the Jewish cemetery of Worms.

According to Yaakov ben Moshe Levi Moelin, Rabbi Meir was an expert in interpreting dreams.

According to Chaim Yosef David Azulai's Shem HaGedolim, a disciple of Rabbi Meir whose name was Meir HaKohen, wrote the famous commentary on Maimonides' Mishneh Torah entitled Hagahot Maimoniyot.

== Works ==
Rabbi Meir wrote no single major work, but many notes, commentaries, expositions, and poems—as well as 1,500 responsa. His disciple the Rosh (Rabbi Asher ben Jehiel) codified much of his teaching.

- His responsa are of great importance to advanced students of the Talmud, as well as to students of Jewish life and customs of those days, especially for the picture which they give of the condition of the German Jews, and of their sufferings from the caprice of princes and from heavy taxation. These responsa also contain rulings of other older and contemporary Ashkenazi poskim; see History of Responsa: Thirteenth century.
- Rabbi Meir is well known as a Tosafist and in particular, authored the Tosafot commentary of the Talmudic tractate Yoma; he is quoted in the Tosafot on various other tractates. He also authored commentaries on the Tohorot and Zeraim orders of the Mishnah.
- Rabbi Meir wrote a number of liturgical poems ("piyyutim"), including Sha'ali Serufa Ba'eish, a kinnah (lament) for the burning of the Talmud influenced by Judah Halevi's Tziyyon ha-lo tishali
- His writings on specific areas of Halakha (Jewish Law) include:
  - Piske Eruvin on the laws of the Eruv;
  - Halachoth Pesukoth a collection of decisions on controversial points of Jewish law;
  - Hilchoth Berachot on the blessings;
  - Hilchoth Avelut on the laws of mourning;
  - Hilchoth Shechitah on the ritual slaughtering of animals for Kosher meat.
