= Tosafot =

Medieval commentaries on the Talmud

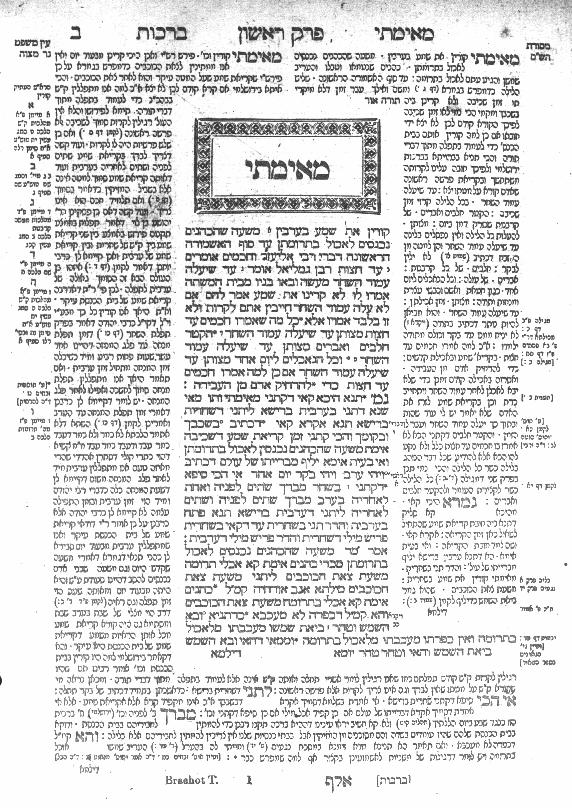
The first page of the Vilna Edition Shas of the Babylonian Talmud, tractate Berakhot, folio 2a. The main text in the middle is the text of the Talmud itself. To the right, on the inner margin of the page, is Rashi's commentary; to the left, on the outer margin, the Tosafot

The Tosafot, Tosafos or Tosfot (Hebrew: תוספות) are medieval commentaries on the Talmud. They take the form of critical and explanatory glosses, printed, in almost all Talmud editions, on the outer margin and opposite Rashi's notes.

The authors of the Tosafot are known as Tosafists; for a listing (see List of Tosafists.)

== Meaning of name ==
The word tosafot literally means "additions". The reason for the title is a matter of dispute among modern scholars.

Many of them, including Heinrich Graetz, think the glosses are so-called additions to Rashi's commentary on the Talmud. In fact, the period of the Tosafot began immediately after Rashi had written his commentary; the first Tosafists were Rashi's sons-in-law and grandsons, and the Tosafot consist mainly of strictures on Rashi's commentary.

Others, especially Isaac Hirsch Weiss, object that many tosafot — particularly those of Isaiah di Trani — have no reference to Rashi. Weiss, followed by other scholars, asserts that tosafot means additions to the Talmud, that is to say, they are an extension and development of the Talmud. For just as the Gemara is a critical and analytical commentary on the Mishnah, so are the Tosafot critical and analytical glosses on those two parts of the Talmud. Further, the term tosafot was not applied for the first time to the glosses of Rashi's continuators, but to the Tosefta, the additions to the Mishnah compiled by Judah ha-Nasi I. Tosefta is a Babylonian term, which in Jerusalem writings is replaced by tosafot. The Tosafot resemble the Gemara in other respects also, for just as the latter is the work of different schools carried on through a long period, so the former were written at different times and by different schools, and gathered later into one body.

== Character ==
Up to and including Rashi, the Talmudic commentators occupied themselves only with the plain meaning ("peshaṭ") of the text; but after the beginning of the twelfth century the spirit of criticism took possession of the teachers of the Talmud. Thus some of Rashi's continuators, as his sons-in-law and his grandson Samuel ben Meïr (RaSHBaM), while they wrote commentaries on the Talmud after the manner of Rashi's, wrote also glosses on it in a style peculiar to themselves.

The Tosafot do not constitute a continuous commentary, but rather (like the "Dissensiones" to the Roman Code of the first quarter of the twelfth century) deal only with difficult passages of the Talmud. Single sentences are explained by quotations which are taken from other Talmudic treatises and which seem at first glance to have no connection with the sentences in question. On the other hand, sentences that seem to be related and interdependent are separated and embodied in different treatises. The Tosafot can be understood only by those who are well advanced in the study of the Talmud, for the most entangled discussions are treated as though they were simple. Glosses explaining the meaning of a word or containing a grammatical observation are very rare.

The Tosafot may be considered from the point of view of a methodology of the Talmud. The rules are certainly not gathered together in one series, as they are, for instance, in Maimonides' introduction to the Mishnah; they are scattered in various parts, and their number is quite considerable. Neither are they stated in fixed terms; a generally accepted rule is followed by "This is the way of the Talmud" or "The Talmud usually declares." Sometimes the negative expression is found, "This is not the way of the Talmud." A frequently recurring rule is indicated by some such formula as "We find many like this."

The above description concerns the general features of the Tosafot; nevertheless, the writings of different Tosafists differ somewhat in style and method. About the method, it should be said that the Tosafot of Touques (see below) concern particularly the casuistic interpretation of the traditional law, but generally avoid deciding on matters of halacha.

Despite the great respect in which Rashi was held by the Tosafists, the latter freely disputed his explanations; see Rashi § Criticism of Rashi.

== History ==
The chief home of Tosafot literature was 11th century France. It began with Rashi's pupils, and was continued mainly by the heads of the French schools. While tosafot began to be written in Germany at the same time as in France, the French tosafists always predominated numerically. The first tosafot recorded are those written by Rashi's two sons-in-law, Meïr b. Samuel of Ramerupt (RaM) and Judah ben Nathan (RIBaN), and by a certain R. Joseph. But their tosafot not being otherwise known, the actual father of the tosafot in France was Jacob b. Meir, known colloquially as Rabbeinu Tam, whose style was adopted by his successors. He wrote a great number of tosafot, many of which are to be found in his "Sefer ha-Yashar"; but not all, as many passages that are cited in the edited tosafot are not found in the work just mentioned. In Germany, at the same time, flourished Isaac ben Asher ha-Levi (RIBA), leader of the German tosafists, who wrote numerous tosafot, which are mentioned by Abraham ben David, and which are very often cited in the edited tosafot. But Isaac ben Asher's tosafot were revised by his pupils, who, according to Rabbeinu Tam, sometimes ascribed to their teacher opinions which were not his. Zedekiah ben Abraham, however, refutes Rabbeinu Tam's assertion.

The most prominent tosafist immediately after Rabbeinu Tam was his pupil and relative Isaac ben Samuel ha-Zaḳen (RI) of Dampierre, whose tosafot form a part of the Tosafot Yeshanim (see below). Isaac was succeeded by his pupil Samson ben Abraham of Sens (R"SH) (d. about 1235), who, besides enriching the literature with his own compositions, revised those of his predecessors, especially his teacher's, and compiled them into the group known as the Tosafot of Sens. Samson's fellow pupil Judah b. Isaac of Paris (Sir Leon) was also very active; he wrote tosafot to several Talmudic treatises, of which those to Berakhot were published at Warsaw (1863); some of those to 'Abodah Zarah are extant in manuscript. Among the many French tosafists deserving special mention was Samuel ben Solomon of Falaise (Sir Morel), who, owing to the destruction of the Talmud in France in his time, relied for the text entirely upon his memory.

The edited tosafot owe their existence particularly to Samson of Sens and to the following French tosafists of the thirteenth century: (1) Moses of Évreux, (2) Eliezer of Touques, and (3) Perez ben Elijah of Corbeil.

It has been said that the first German tosafist, Isaac b. Asher ha-Levi, was the head of a school, and his pupils, besides composing tosafot of their own, revised his. In the thirteenth century the German schools were represented by Baruch ben Isaac, in Regensburg, and later by Meir of Rothenburg (MaHaRaM); the Italian school was represented by Isaiah di Trani. If the tosafot of Asher b. Jehiel (RoSH) (d. 1328) is to be included, the tosafistic period extended through more than two centuries. When the fanaticism of the French monasteries and the judgment of King Louis IX brought about the destruction of the Talmud, the writing of tosafot in France soon ceased.

=== Overview ===
Each generation of Tosafists would add to the compiled glosses, and therefore there are many different versions of the Tosafot. In addition, each compilation of the Tosafos did not contain everything that was said by the Tosafists on the subject so compilations will differ in what they say. Therefore, some things that were said by the Tosafists will be found only in obscure versions of the Tosafot.

=== Publication ===
The final version of these commentaries was published on the outer side of the pages of the Soncino edition of the Talmud, printed in Soncino, Italy (16th century), and was the first printed edition of the full Talmud. The publisher of that edition was a nephew of Rabbi Moshe of Spires (Shapiro) who was of the last generation of Tosafists and who initiated a project of writing a final compilation of the Tosafos. Before he published his Talmud he traveled throughout France to the schools where the Tosafists learned and gathered all of the different manuscripts of that final version of the Tosafos and printed them in his Talmud. Since then every publication of the Talmud was printed with the Tosafos on the outer side of the page (the inner side has the commentary of Rashi) and is an integral part of the study of the Talmud.

=== The burning of the Talmud ===
During the period of the Tosafists the church enacted a law that prohibited possession of the Talmud under pain of death and 24 wagon loads of scrolls of the Talmud were gathered from all of France and burned in the center of Paris. The intention of the church was that the study of the Talmud should be forgotten and once forgotten it would remain forgotten for all generations since there would be nobody to teach it. As a result, the Tosafists devised a system where they could study the Talmud without the existence of a text despite the vastness of the Talmud. They appointed scholars, each to be expert in one of the volumes of the Talmud, to know it by heart and very well, and so through these scholars they would have expertise and knowledge in all of the Talmud. As they would study a particular text in one volume of the Talmud those scholars who were experts in different volumes of the Talmud would tell of anything in the volume of the Talmud that they were experts on that would contradict their understanding of the text at hand. Thus an important aspect of the scholarship of the Tosafists is to use texts in different areas of the Talmud to disprove certain interpretations of the Talmud (often those of Rashi) and to determine the correct way to understand the Talmud.

== Authorities cited ==
The Tosafot quote principally Rashi (very often under the designation qonṭres "pamphlet" (Rashi initially published his commentary in pamphlets), many of the ancient authorities (as Kalonymus of Lucca, Nathan ben Jehiel, and Chananel ben Chushiel ), some contemporary scholars (as Abraham ben David, Maimonides, Abraham ibn Ezra, and others), and about 130 German and French Talmudists of the twelfth and thirteenth centuries. Many of the last-named are known as authors of general Talmudic works, as, for instance, Eliezer ben Nathan of Mainz, Judah of Corbeil, and Jacob of Coucy; but many of them are known only through their being quoted in the Tosafot, as in the case of an Eliezer of Sens, a Jacob of Orléans, and many Abrahams and Isaacs. Some are mentioned just once, including Eliezer of "Pelire" [Falaise? Montpellier?], Ephraim b. David, and one Hezekiah. A commentary on the Pentateuch entitled "Da'at Zeḳenim" (Leghorn, 1783) is attributed to the Tosafists. In form this commentary follows the style of the Tosafot; Rashi is often discussed, and sometimes corrected.

== Schools of Tosafists ==
=== Tosafot of Sens ===
The earliest collection, compiled by Samson ben Abraham of Sens. It was one of the main sources for the Tosafot of Touques, which in turn underlies the present printed Tosafot ("Tosafot shelanu"). Passages from the Tosafot of Sens which did not find their way into the main collection are sometimes printed under the title of Tosafot Yeshanim.

=== Tosafot of Évreux ===
Moses of Évreux, one of the most prolific tosafists, furnished glosses to the whole Talmud; they form a distinct group known as the Tosafot of Évreux. It may be presumed that the "Tosafot of R. Moses" mentioned by Mordechai ben Hillel are identical with the tosafot just mentioned. According to Joseph Colon and Elijah Mizraḥi, Moses wrote his glosses on the margin of Isaac Alfasi's "Halakhot," probably at the time of the burning of the Talmud.

=== Tosafot of Touques ===
Eliezer of Touques, of the second half of the thirteenth century, made a compendium of the Tosafot of Sens and of Évreux; this compendium is called the Tosafot of Touques, and forms the basis of the edited tosafot. Eliezer's own glosses, written on the margin, are known as the Tosafot Gillayon or Gilyon Tosafot. It must be premised, however, that the Tosafot of Touques did not remain untouched; they were revised afterward and supplemented by the glosses of later tosafists. Gershon Soncino, who printed these tosafot, declares that his ancestor Moses of Fürth, who lived in the middle of the fifteenth century, was a descendant in the fifth generation of Moses of Speyer, who is mentioned in the Tosafot of Touques. It is supposed that the last redactor of these tosafot was a pupil of Samson of Chinon.

=== Tosafot of Perez ben Elijah's Pupils ===
Perez ben Elijah of Corbeil was one of the most active of the later tosafists. Besides supplying tosafot to several treatises, which are quoted by many old authorities and are included among the edited tosafot (and many of which were seen in manuscript by Azulai), he revised those of his predecessors. His pupils were not less active; their additions are known as the Tosafot of Perez b. Elijah's Pupils.

=== Other bodies of tosafot ===
==== French Tosafot ====
Mentioned in the novellae on Tamid ascribed to Abraham b. David. Zunz thinks that the Tosafot of Sens may be referred to under this title; but the fact that Abraham b. David was much earlier than Samson of Sens leads to the supposition that the glosses indicated are those of previous tosafists, as Rabbeinu Tam, Isaac b. Asher ha-Levi, and Isaac b. Samuel ha-Zaḳen and his son.

==== Pisḳe Tosafot ("Decisions of the Tosafot") ====
Collection of halakic decisions gathered from the edited tosafot to thirty-six treatises—Nazir and Me'ilah being excepted—and generally printed in the margin of the Tosafot; in the later editions of the Talmud, after the text. These decisions number 5,931; of these 2,009 belong to the tractateBerakot and the order Mo'ed; 1,398 to Niddah and the order Nashim; 1,503 to Neziḳin; and 1,021 to Ḳodashim. The decisions contained in the tosafot to Shabbat, Pesaḥim, Giṭṭin, Ketubot, Baba Ḳamma, Baba Meẓi'a, Baba Batra, and Ḥullin number fully one-half of those recognized as authoritative. The compiler of these decisions can not be identified with certainty; Asher b. Jehiel, his son Jacob b. Asher, and Ezekiel, uncle of Eliezer of Touques, are given by different authorities. Jacob Nordhausen, also, is known to have compiled tosafot decisions; in fact, references to two groups of Pisḳe Tosafot are found in the works of the later commentators.

==== Spanish Tosafot ====
This term is used by Joseph Colon and by Jacob Baruch Landau and may apply to Talmudic novellae by Spanish authors. Jeshuah b. Joseph ha-Levi, for instance, applies the term "tosafot" to the novellae of Isaac ben Sheshet.

==== The Edited Tosafot (also Our Tosafot) ====
The tosafot, which have been published with the text of the Talmud ever since its earliest edition (see Talmud, Editions of). They extend to thirty-eight treatises of the Babylonian Talmud. Most of the treatises are covered by the Tosafot of Touques, some by the Tosafot of Sens; many are provided with the tosafot of various authors, revised by Perez b. Elijah's school. The authorship of the tosafot to seventeen treatises only can be established with certainty:

- Berakot: Moses of Évreux;
- Shabbat, 'Erubin, and Menaḥot: the Tosafot of Sens;
- Beẓah, Nedarim, Nazir, Sanhedrin, Makkot, and Me'ilah: Perez b. Elijah's school (many written by Perez himself);
- Yoma: Meïr of Rothenburg;
- Giṭṭin, Baba Ḳamma, and Ḥullin: the Tosafot of Touques;
- Soṭah: Samuel of Évreux;
- 'Avodah Zarah: Samuel of Falaise;
- Zebaḥim: Baruch b. Isaac of Worms.

The tosafot to Mo'ed Ḳaṭon were written by a pupil of a certain R. Isaac; the author of the tosafot to Ḥagigah wrote tosafot to other treatises also. Those to Ta'anit belong to the post-tosafot period, and differ in style from those to other treatises.

==== Tosafot Alfasi ====
Quoted by Joseph Colon (Responsa, Nos. 5, 31) and Judah Minz (Responsa, No. 10). The term may designate either the tosafot of Samuel b. Meïr and Moses of Évreux, or glosses to Alfasi's Halakot.

==== Tosafot of Gornish ====
Mentioned by Joseph Solomon Delmedigo and Solomon Algazi, the latter quoting these tosafot to Bava kamma. But as the same quotation is made by Betzalel Ashkenazi and ascribed to a pupil of Perez ben Elijah, Azulai concludes that these tosafot originated in Perez b. Elijah's school. Still, Mordecai ben Hillel mentions a R. Judah of Gornish, and Abraham ibn Akra reproduces Talmudic novellae by "M. of Gornish" (Embden gives "Meïr of Gornish" in the Latin translation of the catalogue of the Oppenheim Library, No. 667). Manuscript No. 7 of the Günzburg collection bears the superscription "Tosafot of Gornish to Yebamot," and in these tosafot French and German rabbis are quoted. Manuscript No. 603 of the same collection also the Tosafot of Gornish and novellae by Judah Minz, and fragments of Gornish tosafot are found in manuscripts in other libraries.

Different theories have been advanced with regard to the name "Gornish." According to S. Schechter, it is a corruption of "Mayence", while H. Adler thinks it is a corruption of "Norwich". Gross (l.c.) thinks that Gornish may be identical with Gournay, in France, and that "M. of Gornish," apparently the author of the Tosafot of Gornish, may be Moses of Gornish and identical with the Moses of גריינץ mentioned in the Tosafot of Sens (to Pesaḥim). It may be added that in the supplement to Zacuto's Yuḥasin a David of "Durnish" occurs.

==== Tosafot Ḥiẓoniyyot ("Exterior" or "Uncanonical Tosafot") ====
Tosafot which are neither of Sens nor of Touques. They are so-called by Betzalel Ashkenazi; he included many fragments of them in his Shitah Mekubetzet, to Bava Metzia, Nazir, etc.

==== Tosafot Shiṭṭah (or Shiṭṭah) ====
Name sometimes applied to the recensions of Perez b. Elijah or to the tosafot of Jehiel of Paris.

==== Tosafot Yeshanim ("Tosafot of the Ancients") ====
This group comprises four smaller ones: (1) the general tosafot of Sens, including those appearing among the edited tosafot; (2) the earlier unedited tosafot (for example, those to Ḳiddushin by Isaac b. Samuel haZaken of Dampierre, and those to Avodah Zarah by his son Elhanan ben Isaac); these sometimes appear separately under the title of Tosafot ha-Ri; (3) a collection of old tosafot published by Joseph Jessel b. Wolf ha-Levi in "Sugyot ha-Shas" (Berlin, 1736); (4) various tosafot found in ancient manuscripts, such as the tosafot to Chullin written in 1360, the manuscript of which is in the Munich Library (No. 236). In the collection published by Joseph Jessel b. Wolf haLevi (No. 3), besides the old tosafot to Yoma by Moses of Coucy, there are single tosafot to sixteen treatises—Shabbat, Rosh HaShanah, Megillah, Gittin, Bava Metzia, Menaḥot, Bechorot, Eruvin, Beitzah, Ketubot, Kiddushin, Nazir, Bava Batra, Horayot, Keritot, and Niddah. In the Vilna edition of the Talmud edited by Romm, the "old tosafot" to several treatises are printed.

==== Tosafot ha-Rid ====
By Rabbi Isaiah di Trani.

==== Tosafot Hachmei Anglia ====
A small collection of tosafot composed by rabbis from England.

==== Tosafot ha-Rosh ====
A commentary in tosafot style, and largely dependent on the earlier tosafot collections, composed by Asher ben Jehiel.

== Bibliography ==
=== Tosafot collections ===
The Tosafot shelanu are printed in most Talmud editions, in the column farther from the binding. The Vilna edition also includes tosafot from other collections, such as Tosafot Yeshanim, Tosafot ha-Ri and Tosafot ha-Rid on a few tractates. The Piske Tosafot (decisions of the Tosafot) are printed at the end of each tractate.

Complete sets of the Tosafot ha-Rosh and the Tosafot of Rabbi Peretz are published separately, as are individual volumes from the Tosafot Yeshanim and a few others. The most recent editions of the Talmud, such as the Friedmann edition published by Oz vHadar, incorporate these collections at the back of each volume, in a synoptic fashion. Most of the other collections remain in manuscript or in the form of quotations in later works.

=== Jewish Encyclopedia bibliography ===
- Chaim Azulai, Shem ha-Gedolim, ii.
- Isaac Benjacob, Oẓar ha-Sefarim, pp. 621 et seq.
- Buchholz, in Monatsschrift, xxxviii. 342, 398, 450, 559
- Heinrich Grätz, Gesch. 3d ed., vi. 143-144, 210; vii. 108-110
- Gustav Karpeles, Gesch. der Jüdischen Literatur, i. 574 et seq.
- Isaac Hirsch Weiss, Dor, iv. 336-352
- idem, Toledot Rabbenu Tam, pp. 2–4
- Winter and Wünsche, Jüdische Literatur, ii. 465 et seq.
- Leopold Zunz (the chief source for this article), Zur Geschichte und Literatur (1845), pp. 29 et seq.

=== Other secondary literature ===
- Urbach, E. E., Ba'alei HaTosafot (The Tosafists) (in Hebrew)
- Perlmutter, Haim, Tools for Tosafos, New York 1996, ISBN 1-56871-093-3, ISBN 978-1-56871-093-8
