= History of the Jews in Regensburg =

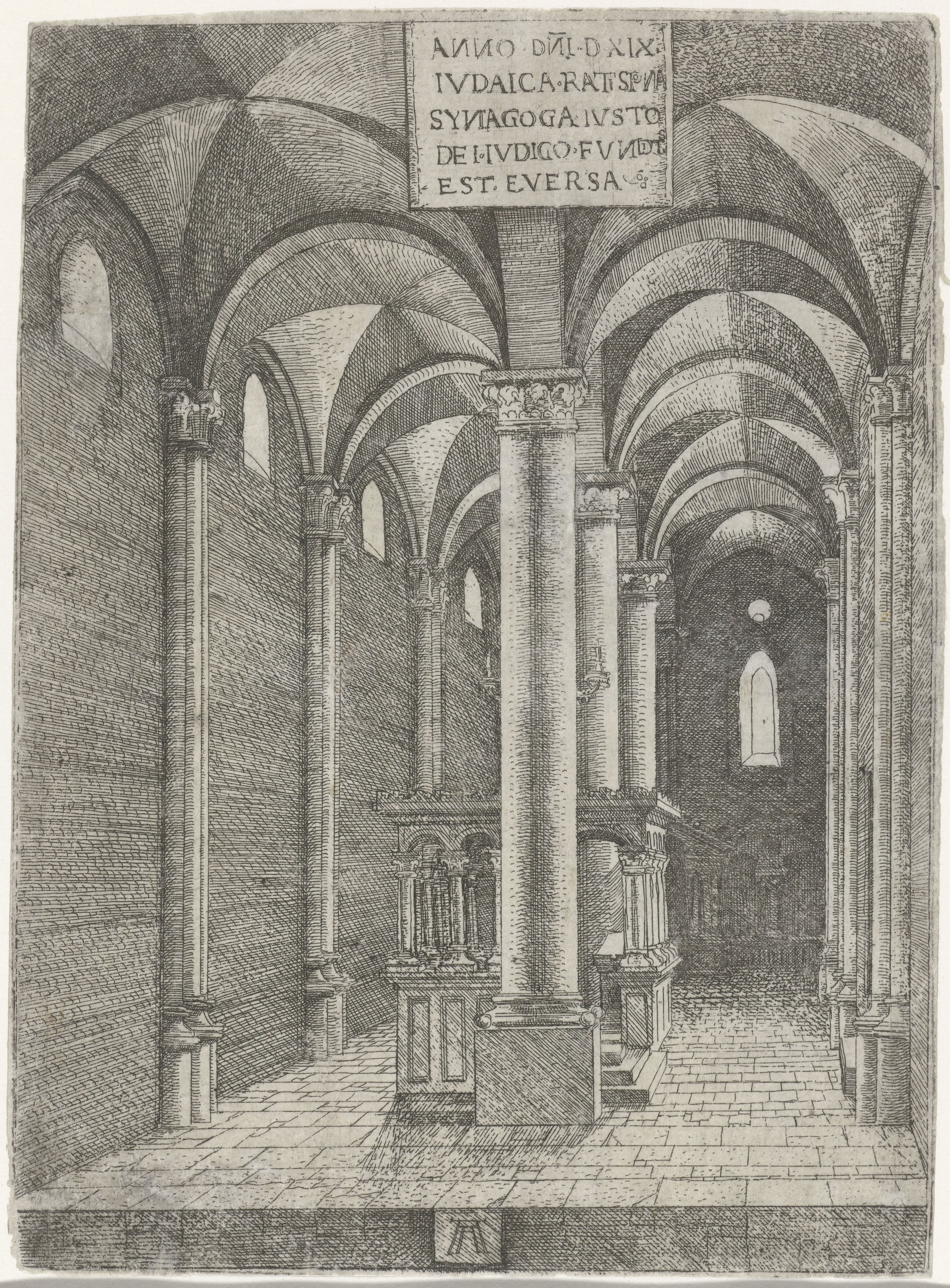
Interior of Regensburg Synagogue immediately before its demolition 1519, Albrecht Altdorfer

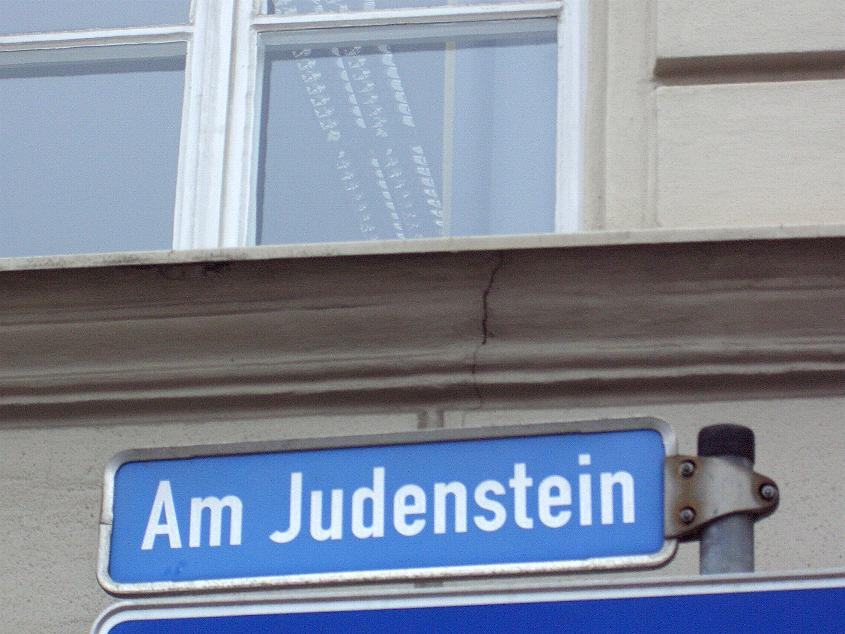
Street sign in the Westnerwacht quarter

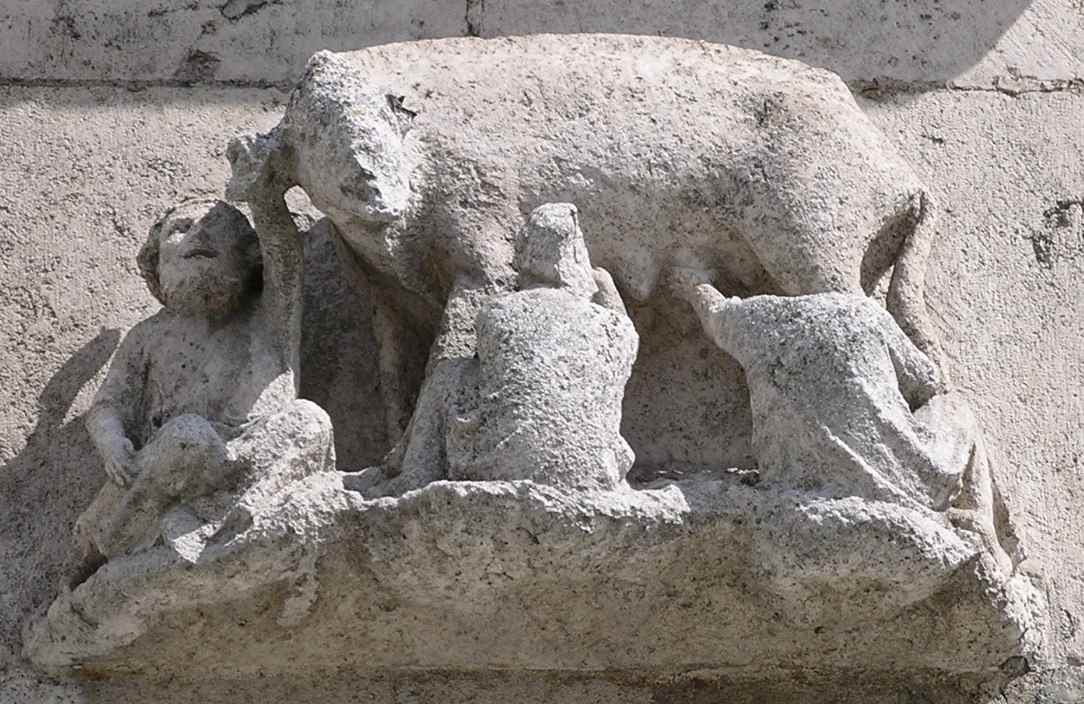
Judensau ("Jews' sow") at Regensburg Cathedral

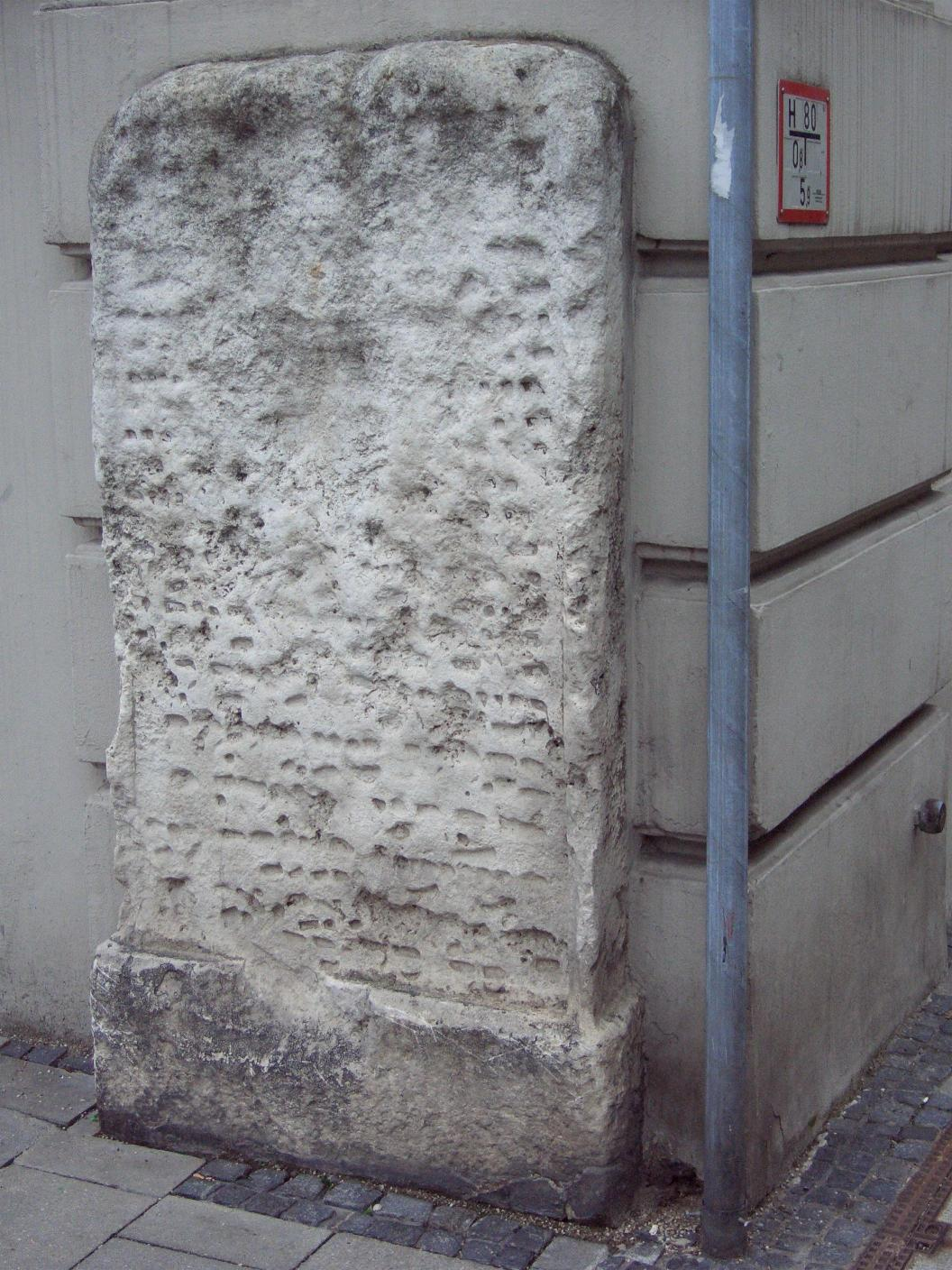
Judenstein ("Jews' stone") at the eponymous middle school

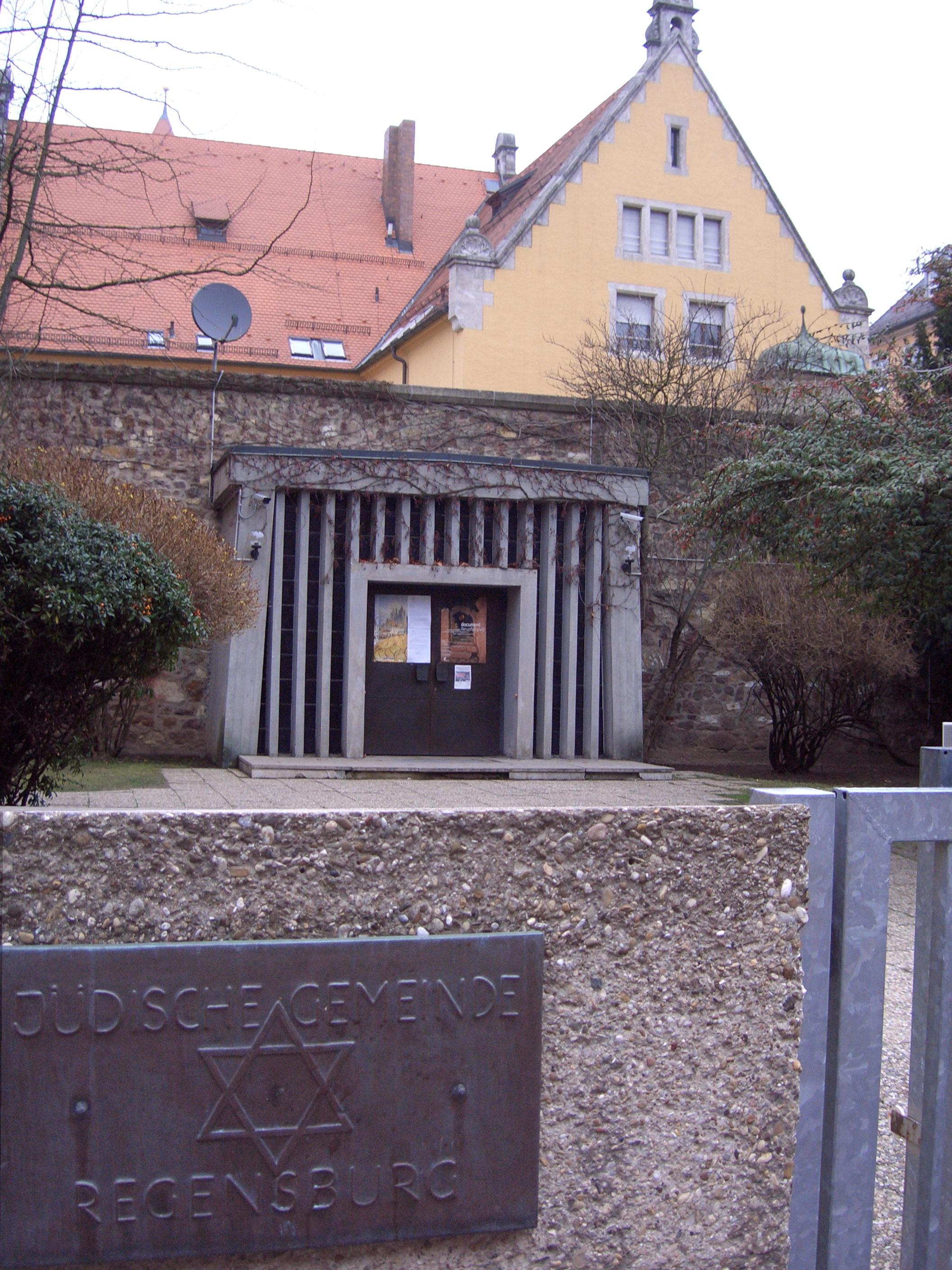
Jewish Community Hall at Regensburg

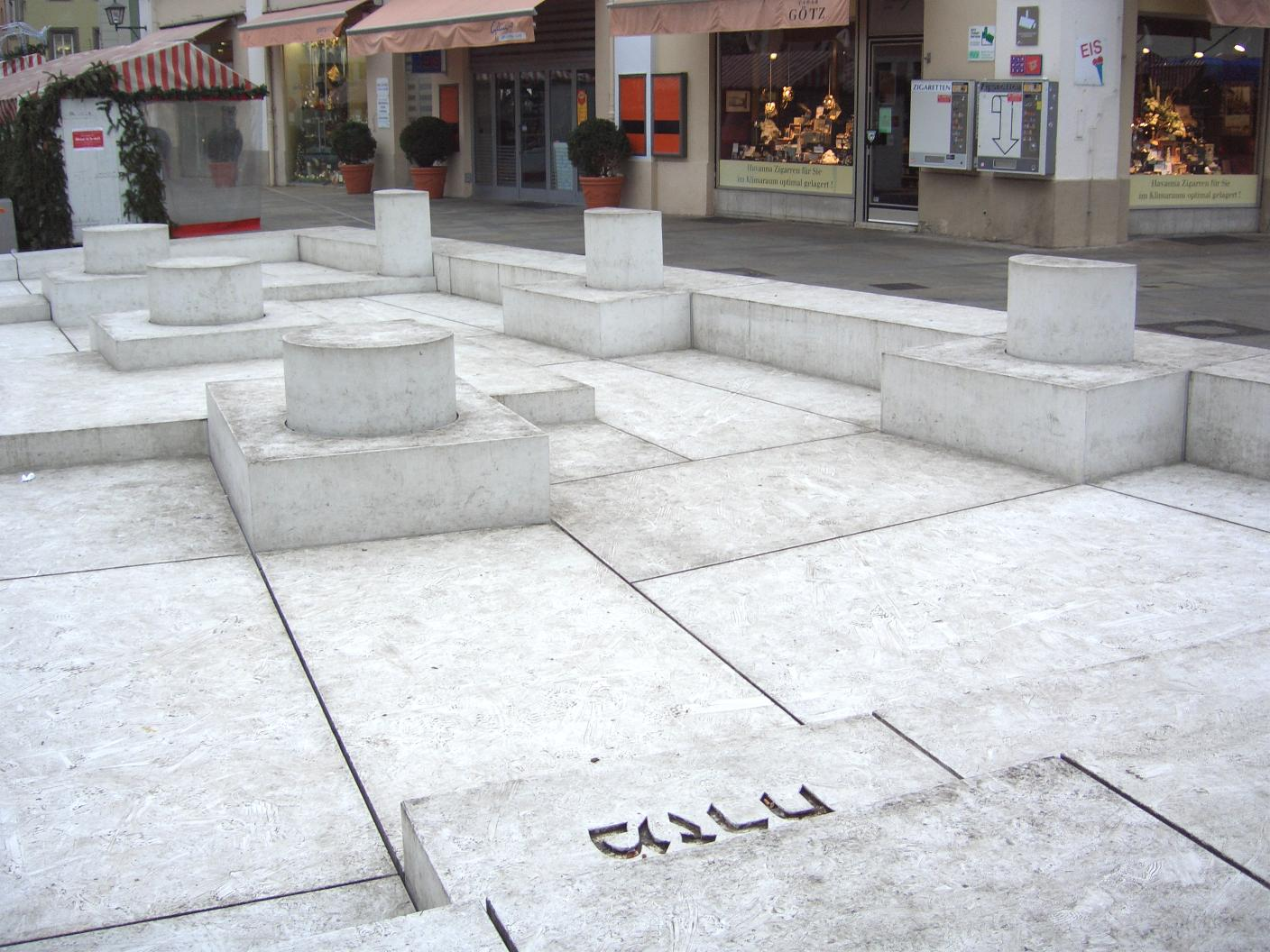
Memorial created by Dani Karavan in 2005 at Neupfarrplatz that depicts the foundation of the synagogue

The history of the Jews in Regensburg, Germany reaches back over 1,000 years. The Jews of Regensburg are part of Bavarian Jewry; Regensburg was the capital of the Upper Palatinate and formerly a free city of the German empire. The great age of the Jewish community in this city is indicated by the tradition that a Jewish colony existed there before the common era; it is undoubtedly the oldest Jewish settlement in Bavaria of which any records exist.

== Early history ==
The earliest historical reference to Jews in Ratisbon (Regensburg) is in a document of 981, where it is stated that the monastery of St. Emmeram bought a piece of property from the Jew Samuel (Aronius, "Regesten", No. 135). The Jewish quarter, "Judæorum habitacula", is mentioned as early as the beginning of the 11th century (1006–28), and is the oldest German ghetto to which there is any reference in historical sources (Aronius, l.c. No. 150). The Jews were granted their first privileges there in a charter of 1182. Therein Emperor Frederick I. confirmed the rights they had received by the favor of his predecessors, and assigned to them, as to their coreligionists throughout the empire, the status of chamber servants (Kammerknechtschaft in German). But their political position became complicated later after the emperor transferred them to the dukes of Lower Bavaria without releasing them from their obligations as chamber servants. To these overlords the Jews of Ratisbon were pawned in 1322 for the yearly sum of 200 pounds of Ratisbon pfennigs, but they were also subject to taxation by the municipal council of the city, though they received some compensation in the fact that thereby they secured the protection of the city council against the excessive demands of the emperor and the dukes.

== History of the community ==
During the first Crusade (1096) the community suffered like many others in Germany. An old chronicle is quoted as referring to the persecutions that took place in Franconia and Swabia in 1298: "The citizens of Ratisbon desired to honor their city by forbidding the persecution of the Jews or the slaying of them without legal sentence." The community completed a new synagogue in the early 13th century The synagogue provided seating for over 300 people. Recent archaeological excavations have uncovered the synagogue's foundations and its mikvah.

Evidence exists of Jewish merchants from Regensburg trading in furs with Russia and Hungary as early as 1050. Later, due to multiple occupational restrictions, the Regensburg Jews increasingly focused on banking and, since the Regensburg Jewish Privilege issued by Emperor Frederick Barbarossa in 1182, on trade in precious metals. The Regensburg Jews played a significant role as financiers, lending money to monasteries, nobles, merchants, the city treasury, and even the Hanseatic League. In 1297, the Archbishop of Salzburg purchased the county of Gastein with money borrowed from Regensburg Jews. This wealth is reflected in a cache of 624 14th-century gold coins, thought to be buried in 1388, found in the archaeological dig.

The wave of religious intolerance which swept over Germany in 1349 was checked again at Ratisbon, in a spirit similar to that of fifty years earlier, by the declaration of the magistrates and the citizens that they would protect and defend their Jews. The municipal council again shielded them by punishing only the guilty when, in 1384, a riot occurred because some Jews had been convicted of giving false returns of their property to the tax-assessor. The protestations of the magistrates, however, could not protect their wards against emperor Wenzel. The right to live in the Holy Roman Empire or in the city of Regensburg began to be tied to multiple tax obligations when, between 1385 and 1390, the emperor replenished his purse with an "imperial Jewish tax" levied upon the German Jews. In the following years they were again heavily taxed by both emperor and dukes, and in 1410 the magistrates turned away from ineffectual protest and made an agreement with the duke that the Jews should pay the extraordinarily high tax of 200 florins a year to him and 60 pounds a year to the city. This marks the turning-point in the history of the Jews of Ratisbon. Over the course of the 15th century, the Jewish community became so impoverished that it could no longer meet these financial demands.

The overall impoverishment of the city fueled tensions between 1475 and 1519, and ultimately culminated in the expulsion of the Jewish community. The anti-Semitic preachings of Peter Nigri led to the confiscating of the Jews' property in 1476, and the community was then thrown into chaos by the Simon of Trent trial in Italy. The Jewish community of Trent, in a blood libel, was accused of murdering a Christian boy for ritual purposes. Coerced by torture, one of the accused implicated the Jewish community of Ratisbon in the ritual murder of Christian children whose blood was used to make Passover matzo. Word was sent to Ratisbon and seventeen Jews were arrested. They remained imprisoned for four years, and were released only after repeated requests from Frederick III. By the time of this so-called ritual murder trial against Rabbi Israel Bruna 1476–1480, the community was economically ruined, and Rabbi Bruna left the city of Regensburg. Later, the local Catholic priest, Balthasar Hubmaier (who would subsequently become a prominent Anabaptist), called for the expulsion of Jews from the city, turning their synagogue into a church, and accused them of usury. When Maximilian died, the opportunity was taken to expel the Jews from the city, 800 in all, in 1519. Afterwards, about 5,000 tombstones from the Jewish cemetery were razed and used as building material. The synagogue was also razed and a chapel was built on the site, which became a popular pilgrimage place.

== In modern times ==
=== 1660–1900 ===
In 1669 Jews were again permitted to reside in Ratisbon, but it was not until April 2, 1841, that the community was able to dedicate its new synagogue. Rabbi Isaac Alexander (born Ratisbon August 22, 1722) was probably the first rabbi to write in German. His successor appears to have been Rabbi Weil, who was succeeded by Sonnentheil and the teacher Dr. Schlenker. From 1860 to 1882 the rabbinate was occupied by Dr. Löwenmeyer of Sulzburg, who was followed in January, 1882, by Dr. Seligmann Meyer, the editor of the "Deutsche Israelitische Zeitung". The present (1905) total population of Ratisbon is 45,426, of whom about 600 are Jews.

== Cemetery and synagogue ==
The first cemetery of the community of Ratisbon was situated on a hillock, still called the "Judenau". In 1210 the congregation bought from the monastery of St Emmeram a plot of ground, outside the present Peterthor, for a new cemetery, which was destroyed in the course of excavations made in the city in 1877. It served as a burial-ground for all the Jews of Upper and Lower Bavaria, and, in consequence of the catastrophe of February 21, 1519, mentioned above, more than 4,000 of its gravestones are said to have been either demolished or used in the building of churches. The synagogue that was destroyed was an edifice in Old Romanesque style, erected between 1210 and 1227 on the site of the former Jewish hospital, in the center of the ghetto, where the present Neue Pfarre stands. The ghetto was separated from the city itself by walls and closed by gates.

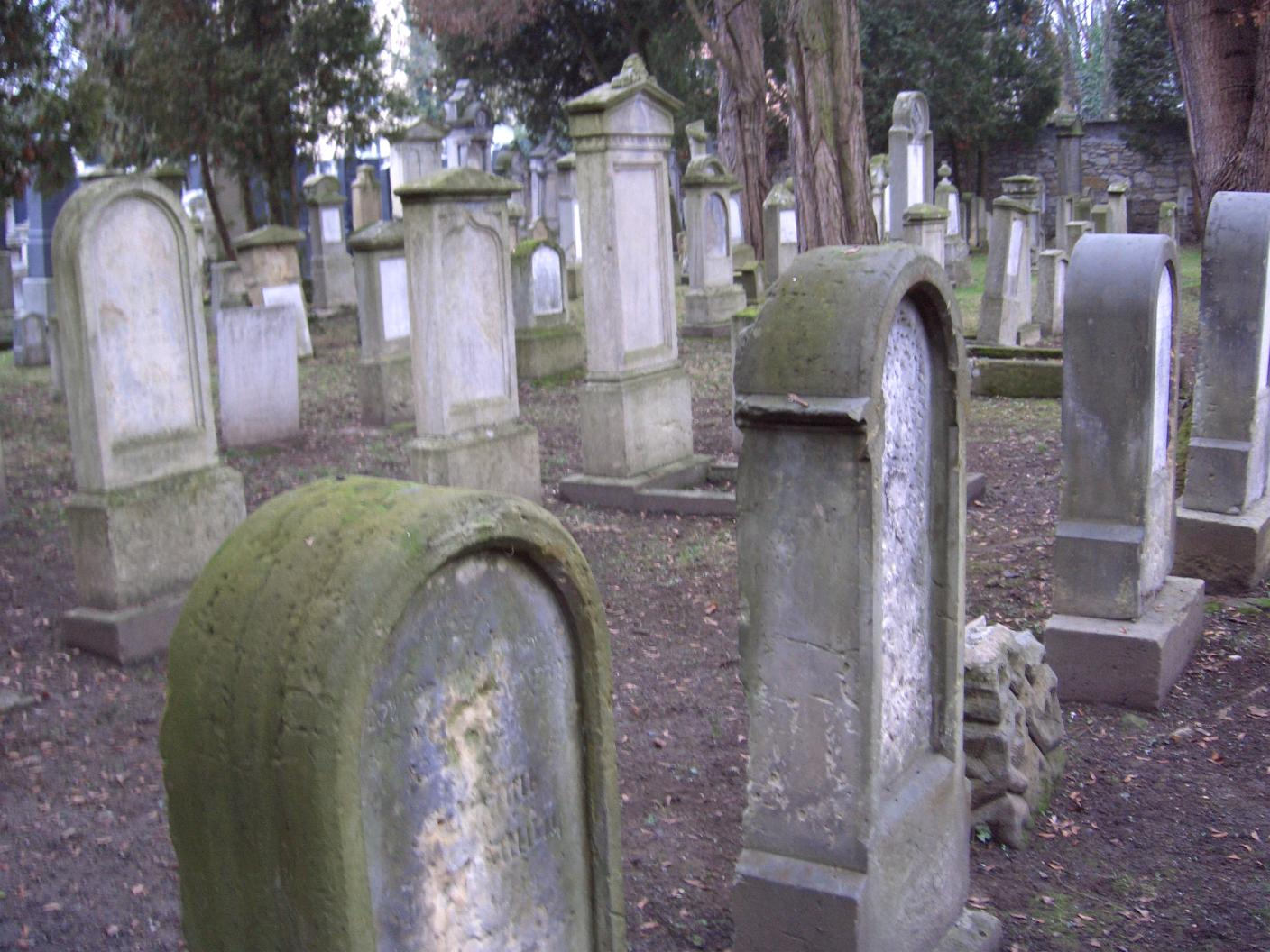
Jewish cemetery in Schillerstraße

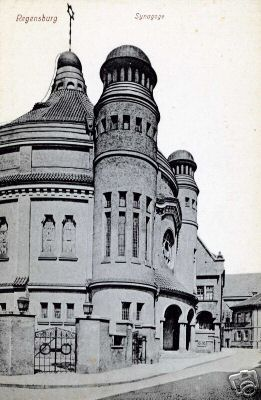
Postcard of the former synagogue in c. 1915

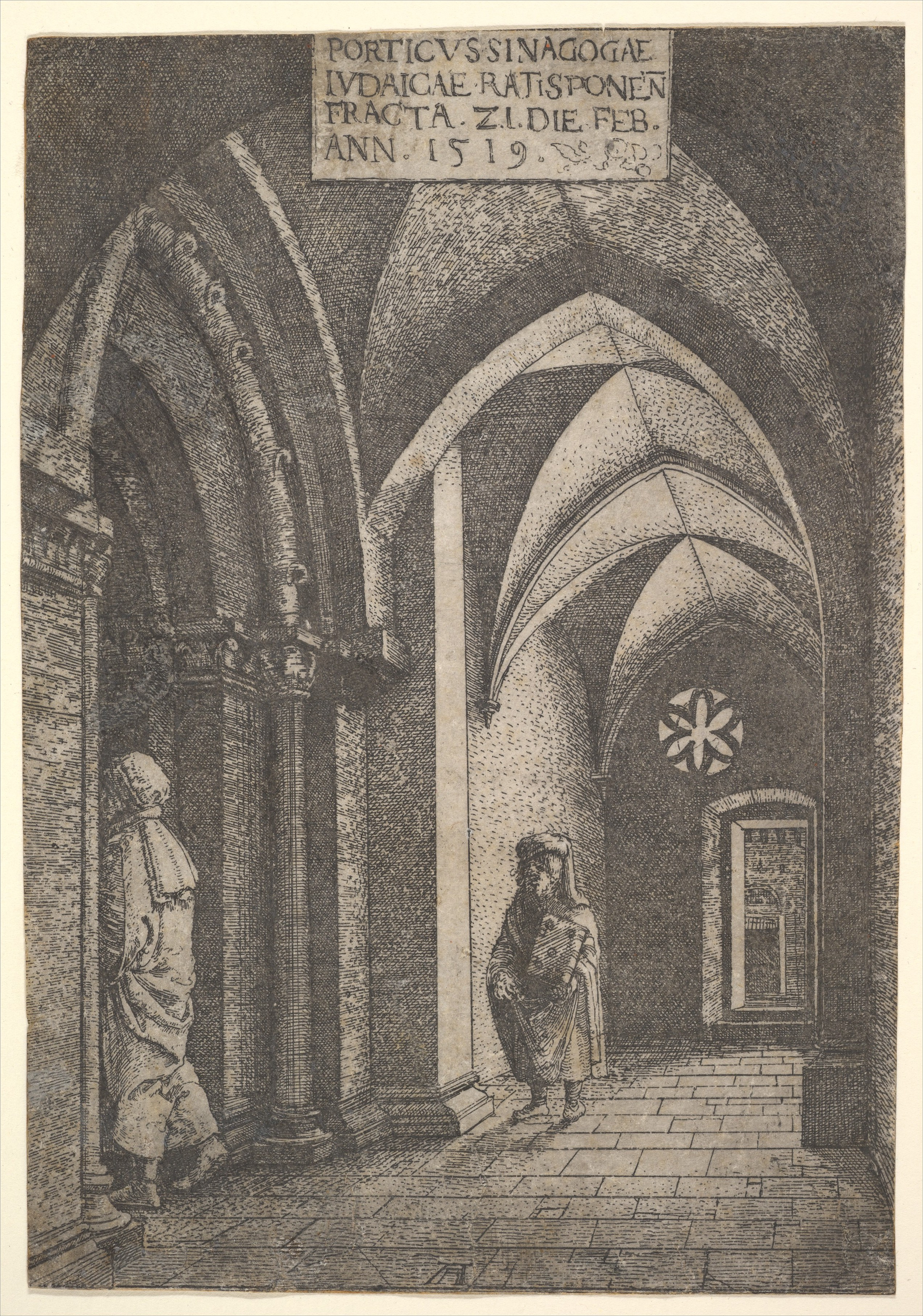
The entrance hall of the Regensburg Synagogue, 1519

== Notable Jews from Regensburg ==
- Pethahiah ben Jacob ha-Laban (born at Prague, flourished between 1175 and 1190), traveler
- Isaac ben Mordecai of Regensburg, 12th century tosafist.
- Abraham ben Moses of Regensburg (flourished about 1200), tosafist
- Wolfkan of Ratisbon (2nd half of the 15th century), Jewish convert to Christianity and traducer of the Jews
- Isaac Alexander (2nd half of the 18th century)

=== Scholars ===
The "ḥakme Regensburg" of the 12th century were regarded far and wide as authorities, and a number of tosafists flourished in this ancient community. Especially noteworthy were Rabbi Ephraim ben Isaac (d. about 1175), one of the most prominent teachers of the Law and a liturgical poet, and Rabbi Baruch ben Isaac, author of the "Sefer ha-Terumah" and of tosafot to the treatise Zebaḥim. The best known of all was Rabbi Judah ben Samuel he-Ḥasid (died 1217), the author of the Sefer Ḥasidim and of various halakic and liturgical works. The Talmudic school of Ratisbon became famous in the 15th century; a chronicle of 1478 says, "This academy has furnished 'doctores et patres' for all parts of Germany." Rabbi Israel Bruna (15th century) narrowly escaped falling a victim to an accusation of ritual murder. The chronicler Anselmus de Parengar gives an interesting description of the magnificent apartments of the grand master Samuel Belassar. Shortly before the dispersion of the community Rabbi Jacob Margolioth, the father of the convert and anti-Jewish writer Antonius Margarita, was living at Ratisbon; he is referred to in the Epistolæ Obscurorum Virorum as the Primus Judæorum Ratisbonensis. Finally, the learned Litte (Liwe) of Ratisbon may be mentioned, the author of the "Samuelbuch", which paraphrased the history of King David in the meter of the Nibelungenlied.
