= List of rabbis known by acronyms =

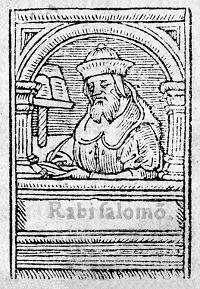
16th-century depiction of Rashi

A number of prominent rabbis have been known by acronyms.

Name	Acronym	Dates
Isaac Luria	Arizal	1510-1573
Israel ben Eliezer (the Baal Shem Tov)	Besht	1698-1760
Chaim Soloveitchik	Gra"ch	1853-1918
Saul Lieberman	Gra"sh	1898-1983
Yitzchok Zev Soloveitchik	GRY"Z"	1886-1959
Elijah ben Solomon Zalman (Vilna Gaon)	HaGra	1720-1797
Yitzhak of Volozhin	HagRIts	1780-1849
Levi ibn Habib	HaRaLBaCh	c.1480 - c.1545
Shimon Agassi	Harashba	1852–1914
Chaim Yosef David Azulai	Hida	1724-1806
Moses ben Joseph di Trani	Mabit	1500-1580
Judah Loew ben Bezalel	Maharal	1526-1607
Meir Lublin	Maharam	1555-1616
Meir of Rothenburg	Maharam	c. 1215-1293
Meir Wahl	Maharash	17th century
Ḥayyim Shabbethai	Maharhash	1557-1647
Yaakov ben Moshe Levi Moelin	Maharil	c.1365-1427
Joseph Taitazak	MahaRITaTS	16th century
Shmuel Eidels	Maharsha	1555 – 1631
Solomon Luria	Maharshal or Rashal	1534-1572
Samuel Judah Katzenellenbogen	MaHaShiks	1521–1597
Meïr Leibush ben Jehiel Michel Weiser	Malbim	1809–1879
Naftali Zvi Yehuda Berlin	Netziv	1816–1893
Aharon HaLevi	Ra'ah	1235–1290
Eliezer ben Joel HaLevi	Ra'avyah	1140–1225
Abraham ibn Daud	RABad (I)	1110-1180
Abraham ben Isaac of Narbonne	RABad (II)	1080-1158
Abraham ben David	RABad (III)	1125-1198
Baruch Ashlag	Rabash	1907-1991
David Kimhi	Radak	1160–1235
David ben Solomon ibn Abi Zimra	Radbaz	1479–1573
Joshua Falk	RaFaC, Ma-HaRWaC or MaHaRY KTz	1555-1614
Levi ben Gershon (Gersonides)	Ralbag	1288–1344
Meir ben Samuel	Ram	1060–1135
Moshe Hacohen	Ramach	1874–1950
Meir Abulafia	Ramah	1170-1244
Moses ben Jacob Cordovero	Ramak	1522–1570
Moses S. Margolies	Ramaz	1851–1936
Moses ben Maimon (Maimonides)	Rambam	1135–1204
Moses ben Nahman (Nahmanides)	Ramban	1194–1270
Moses ben Joseph ben Merwan ha-Levi	Rambi	Mid-12th or 13th century
Moshe Chaim Luzzatto	Ramchal or Ramhal	1707–1746
Nissim of Gerona	Ran	1320–1376
Peretz ben Elijah	Rap	Died 1295
Sholom Dovber Schneersohn	Rashab	1860–1920
Shemaryahu Gurary	Rashag	1897–1989
Shlomo ben Aderet	Rashba	1235–1310
Rabban Simeon ben Gamliel	Rashbag	10 BCE–70 CE
Samuel ben Meir	Rashbam	1085–1158
Samuel ben Natronai	RaSHBaT	c. 1105 – 1197
Simeon ben Zemah Duran	Rashbatz	c. 1361 – 1444
Samuel de Medina	RaShDaM	1505-1589
Simeon bar Yochai	Rashbi	1st century
Shlomo Yitzhaki	Rashi	1040–1105
Yosef Yitzchak Schneersohn	RaYYatz or Rayatz	1880–1950
Eliezer ben Samuel	Re'em	c. 1115–c. 1198
Elijah Mizrachi	Re'em	1455–1525
Moses Isserles	Rema	1520–1572
Isaiah di Trani the Younger	Riaz	13th century
Isaac ben Asher ha-Levi	Riba	11th century
Isaac ben Mordecai of Regensburg	Ribam	12th century
Judah ben Nathan	Riban	11th–12th centuries
Isaac ben Todros	Ribat	11th–12th centuries
Isaac ben Melchizedek	Ribmaṣ	1090–1160
Isaiah di Trani	Rid	c. 1180 – c. 1250
Yaakov Dovid Wilovsky	Ridvaz or Ridbaz	1845–1913
Isaac Alfasi	Rif	1013–1103
Yom Tov Asevilli	Ritva	1250–1330
Isaac ben Meir	Rivam	c. 1090 – c. 1130
Isaac ben Mordecai of Regensburg	Rivam	12th century
Isaac ben Sheshet	Rivash	1326–1408
Asher ben Jehiel	Rosh	1250 or 1259 – 1327
Samuel David Luzzatto	Shadal	1800–1865
Shabbatai HaKohen	Shakh	1621–1662
David HaLevi Segal	Taz	1586–1667

== See also ==
- Lists of nicknames – nickname list articles on Wikipedia
- Hebrew acronyms
