= Rabbi Ephraim =

There were a number of medieval rabbinic scholars and biblical exegetes named Ephraim:

- Ephraim ben Isaac of Regensburg, a 12th-century German tosafist
- Ephraim ben Jacob HaKohen, a 17th-century Lithuanian talmudist
- Ephraim ben Joseph of Chelm, a 16th-century Polish liturgist
- Ephraim ben Judah, a 12th-century French liturgist
- Ephraim ben Nathan, a 13th-century German talmudist
- Ephraim ben Samson, a 12th-century French tosafist
- Ephraim of Bonn, a 12th-century German talmudist
- Ephraim of Sudilkov, an 18th-century Polish author and member of the Baal Shem Tov's rabbinic dynasty
