= Joel ben Isaac ha-Levi =

12th-century German Tosafist

Rabbi Yoel ben Isaac ha-Levi (Hebrew: רבי יואל בן יצחק הלוי; c. 1115 - 1200) also known as Rav Yoel of Bonn was a 12th-century German Tosafist, and the father of Eliezer ben Joel HaLevi.

== Biography ==
Born in about 1115 in Mainz, Germany, his father Rabbi Yitzchak HaLevi, may have been a minor Rabbi in Mainz. Through his wife, he was related to Samuel ben Natronai. In his early years, Rabbi Yoel studied in Regensburg under Isaac ben Mordecai and Ephraim ben Isaac. It was Ephraim ben Isaac in particular that Rabbi Yoel had an intense exchange with regarding eating abdominal fat. He later spent time in Wuerzburg and Cologne, finally settling in Bonn, where he set up his own yeshiva. His most notable pupils were his son Eliezer and Ephraim of Bonn whom he was related to though his wife. Several of his commentaries have been preserved in "Sefer ha-Ravyah" written by his son, and "Yihusei Tanna'im va-Amora'im" by his one of his teachers, Judah ben Kalonymus. Rabbi Yoel is also known for several of his liturgical hymns, reflecting the horrors of the Second Crusade. Many of his contemporaries such as Isaac ben Samuel wrote about Rabbi Yoel referring to him with great admiration. Rabbi Yoel later died in 1200.
