= Ya Comimos =

Sephardic Jews prayer recited after a meal

Ya Comimos is a poetic Judeo-Spanish (Ladino) prayer said after the recital of Birkat Hamazon. It can be found in some birchonim, some Spanish and Portuguese siddurim and some Haggadot.

Ya Comimos (Traditional Ladino)	Ya Komimos (Modern Ladino)	We Have Eaten (English Translation)
Ya comimos y bevimos, y al Dio santo Baruch Hu u-Baruch Shemo bendiximos; que mos dió y mos dará pan para comer, y paños para vestir y años para bivir. El Padre el grande que mande al chico asegun tenemos de menester para muestras cazas y para muestros hijos. El Dio mos oiga y mos aresponda y mos apiade por su nombre el grande, somos almicas sin pecado. Hodu L'Adonai ki tov ki le-olam hasdo. Hodu L'Adonai ki tov ki le-olam hasdo. Siempre mijor, nunca peor, nunca mos manque la meza del Criador. Amen.	Ya komimos, y bevimos, i al Dio santo Baruj Hu u-Baruj Shemo bendishimos; ke mos dio i mos dara pan para komer, i panyos para vestir i anyos para bivir. El Padre el grande ke mande al chico asegun tenemos de menester para muestras cazas i para muestros hijos. El Dio mos oiga i mos aresponda i mos apiade por su nombre el grande, somos almikas sin pekado. Hodu L'Adonai ki tov ki le-olam jasdo. Hodu L'Adonai ki tov ki le-olam jasdo. Siempre mijor, nunka peor, nunka mos manke la meza del Kriador. Amen.	We have eaten, and we drank, and to The Holy One, Blessed Be He we blessed; that gave us and will give us bread to eat, and clothes to wear, and years to live. The Great Father that gives to the little one, gives to us our needs for our homes and for our children. God hears us and answers us and has pity on us, because of His Great Name, we are little souls without sin. Give thanks to The Lord, for He is good, for His Mercy endures forever. Give thanks to The Lord, for He is good, for His Mercy endures forever. Always better, never worse, never should the table of The Creator lack for us. Amen

This prayer has form somewhat similar to Bendigamos, and shares some elements with the content of the Birkat Hamazon.
