= Jacob HaGozer =

Rabbi Jacob HaGozer, also Rabbi Ya'akov HaGozeir and other transliterations, was an early 13th century German Rabbi and mohel. He was the nephew of Rabbi Ephraim of Bonn, and he authored a work on the laws of brit milah (circumcision). That volume was published, together with his son Gershom's work of a similar nature, in 1892 under the title Zikhron Berit LaRishonim, a play on words (it is both a paraphrase of Leviticus 26:45 and literally means 'A remembrance of the brit of the Rishonim'). According to the Encyclopedia Talmudit, R' Gershom's work is the original source of the Jewish custom of refusing a convert three times before accepting him.
