= Elohim tzivita li-yedidcha bechiracha =

Elohim tzivita li-yedidcha bechiracha (Hebrew: אלהים צוית לידידך בחירך, literally "God, You Commanded Your Beloved Chosen One") is a piyyut recited during Birkat Hamazon for the meal of a berit milah ceremony. The piyyut is composed by Rabbi Ephraim of Bonn.

The piyyut was accepted in Western Ashkenazic communities, and it is recited in these communities in the blessing on the land after the words Yitbarach shimcha be-fi khol hai tamid le-'olam va'ed ("May Your name be blessed by the mouth of all the living, always and forever") in the second blessing. It was not accepted in the Eastern Ashkenaz rite.

== History ==
Piyyutim for Birkat Hamazon were quite common in Middle Eastern lands during the heyday of liturgical poetry, and many such piyyutim were found in the Genizah. However, these piyyutim are very rare in European communities, and this is the only piyyut of its kind that made it into printed prayer books. Furthermore, in the Birkat Hamazon piyyutim found in the Genizah, there is always a piyyut for each of the three Biblically ordained blessings of Birkat Hamazon, while this piyyut is just for the second blessing.

Reciting this piyyut was considered an important or special event. Juspa Schammes describes a case where he circumcised a baby during a plague in 1666. The baby's sister died from the plague that week, and due to the circumstances no circumcision feast was held. He recounts that in order to not miss the opportunity to recite the piyyut, some more distant relatives gathered and held a small meal and recited this piyyut in Birkat Hamazon.

Rabbi David Lida wrote his poem "Dam Berit" (literally "The Blood of the Covenant") to the melody of this piyyut.

== Structure of the piyyut ==
The piyyut consists of stanzas of four lines, with the first three lines of each stanza signed "Ephraim me-'ir Bonn" (Hebrew: אפרים מעיר בונא, literally "Ephraim from the city of Bonn"), and the fourth line in each stanza is a biblical verse. The second line of each stanza ends with the words "Berit Olam" (Hebrew: ברית עולם, "everlasting covenant"), and when reciting the piyyut, it is customary for the mohel to lead and recite the entire piyyut out loud, and the congregation responds "Berit Olam" in a special melody. When two mohels officiate, one leads and the two mohels recite alternate stanzas.
