= Birkat Hamazon =

Jewish blessings after meals

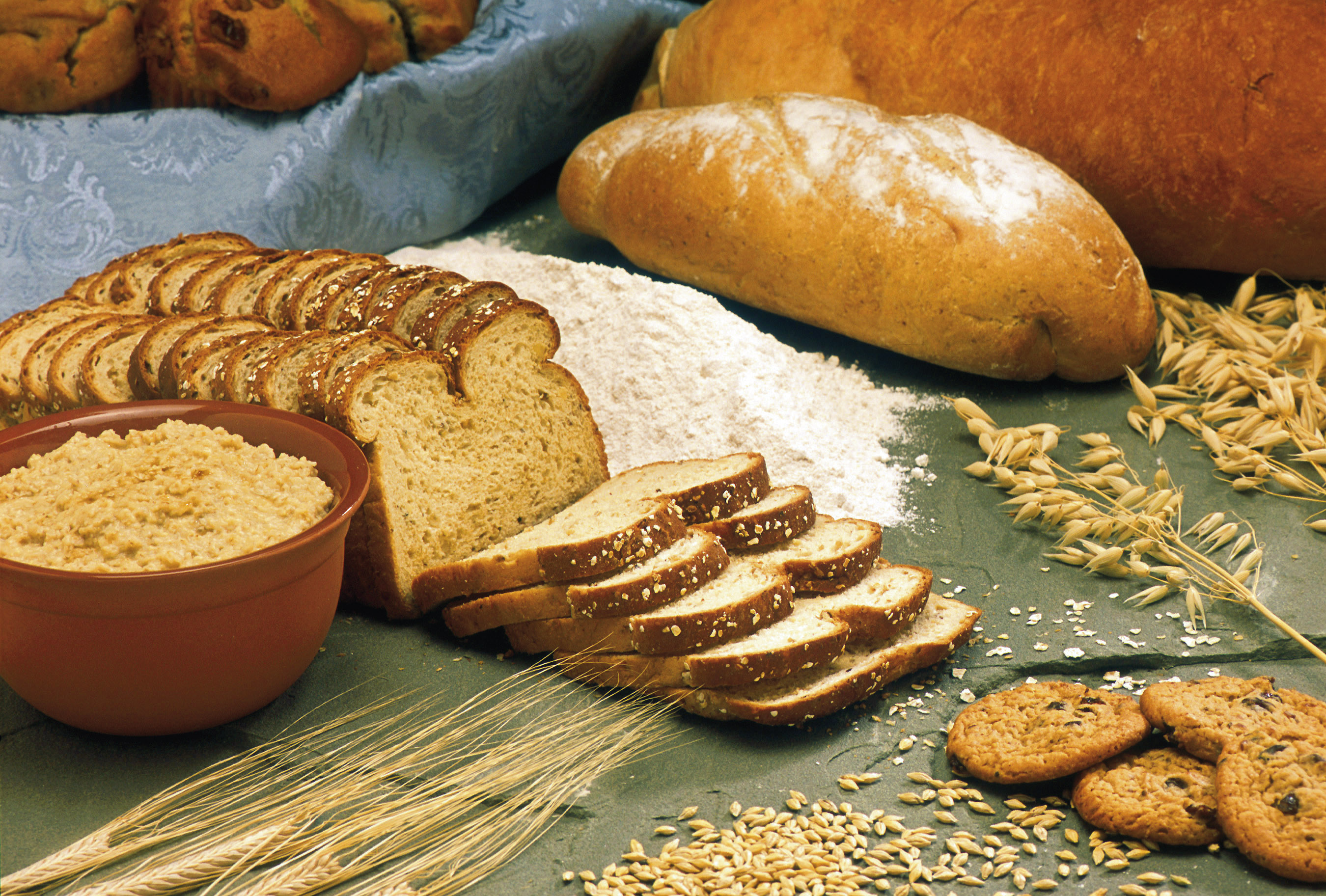
- Birkat Hamazon is recited after consuming a meal eaten with bread

Halakhic texts relating to this article
- Torah: Deuteronomy 8:10
- Mishnah: Berakhot ch. 7
- Babylonian Talmud: Berakhot
- Jerusalem Talmud: Berakhot
- Mishneh Torah: Hilkhot Berakhot
- Shulchan Aruch: Orach Chayim 182 - 201

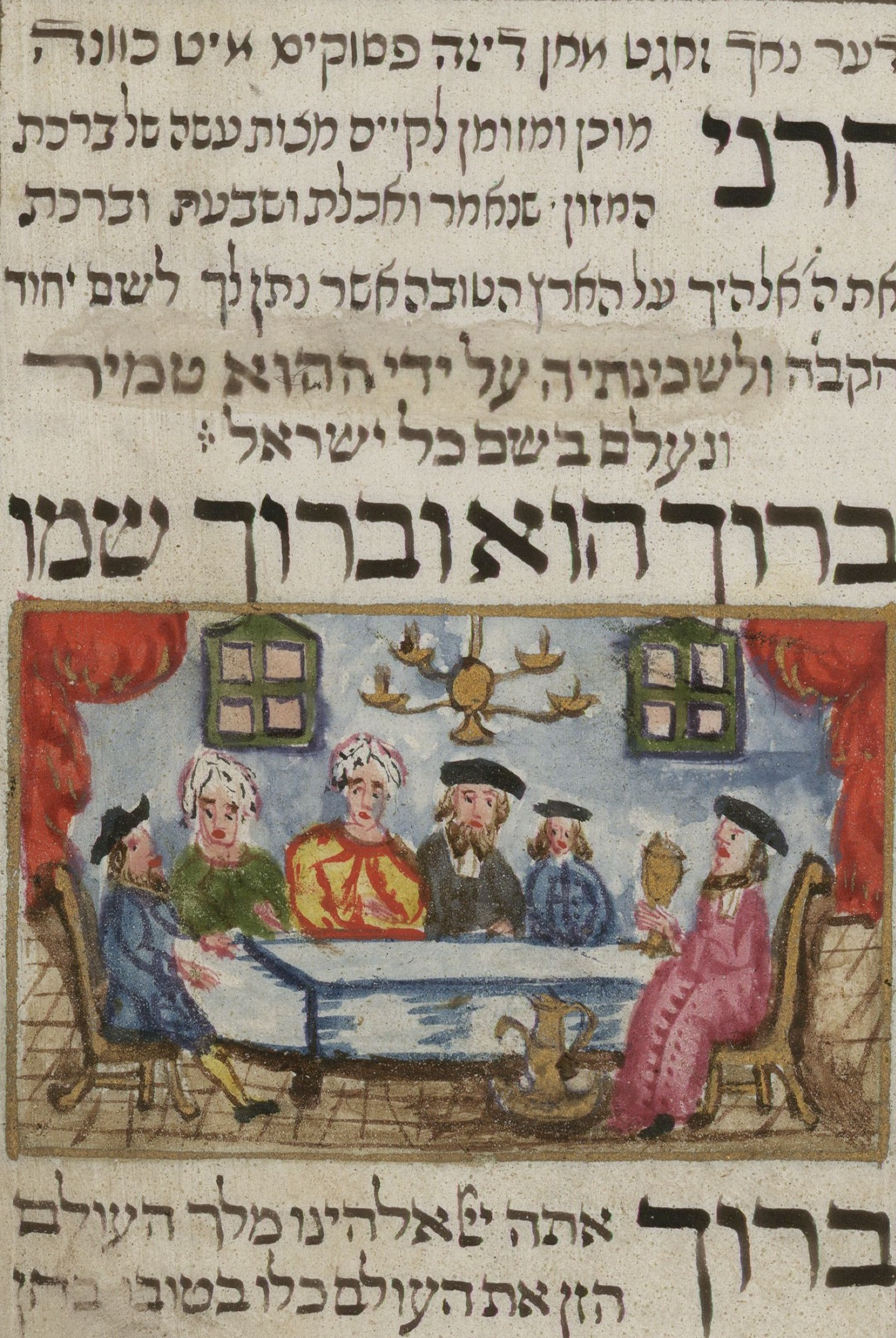
The start of the blessing, in a siddur from the city of Fürth, 1738

Birkat Hamazon (Hebrew: בִּרְכַּת הַמָּזוׂן, romanized: birkath hammāzôn "The Blessing of the Food"), known in English as the Grace After Meals (Yiddish: בענטשן, romanized: benchen "to bless", Yinglish: Bentsching), is a set of Hebrew blessings that Jewish law prescribes following a meal that includes at least a kezayit (olive-sized) piece of bread. It is understood as a mitzvah (Biblical commandment) based on Deuteronomy 8:10.

Birkat Hamazon is recited after a meal containing bread or similar foods that is made from the five grains, with the exception of bread that comes as a dessert (pas haba'ah b'kisanin) and food that does not possess the form or appearance of bread (torisa d'nahama), in which case a blessing that summarizes the first three blessings (birkat me'ein shalosh) is recited instead. It is a matter of rabbinic dispute whether Birkat Hamazon must be said after eating certain other bread-like foods such as pizza.

Except in teaching situations, Birkat Hamazon is typically read individually after ordinary meals. The blessing can be found in almost all siddurs and is often printed in a variety of artistic styles in a small booklet called a birchon (or birkon, בִּרְכּוׂן) in Hebrew or bencher (or bentscher) in Yiddish. The length of the different brakhot hamazon can vary considerably, from bentsching in under half a minute to more than five minutes.

== Source and text ==
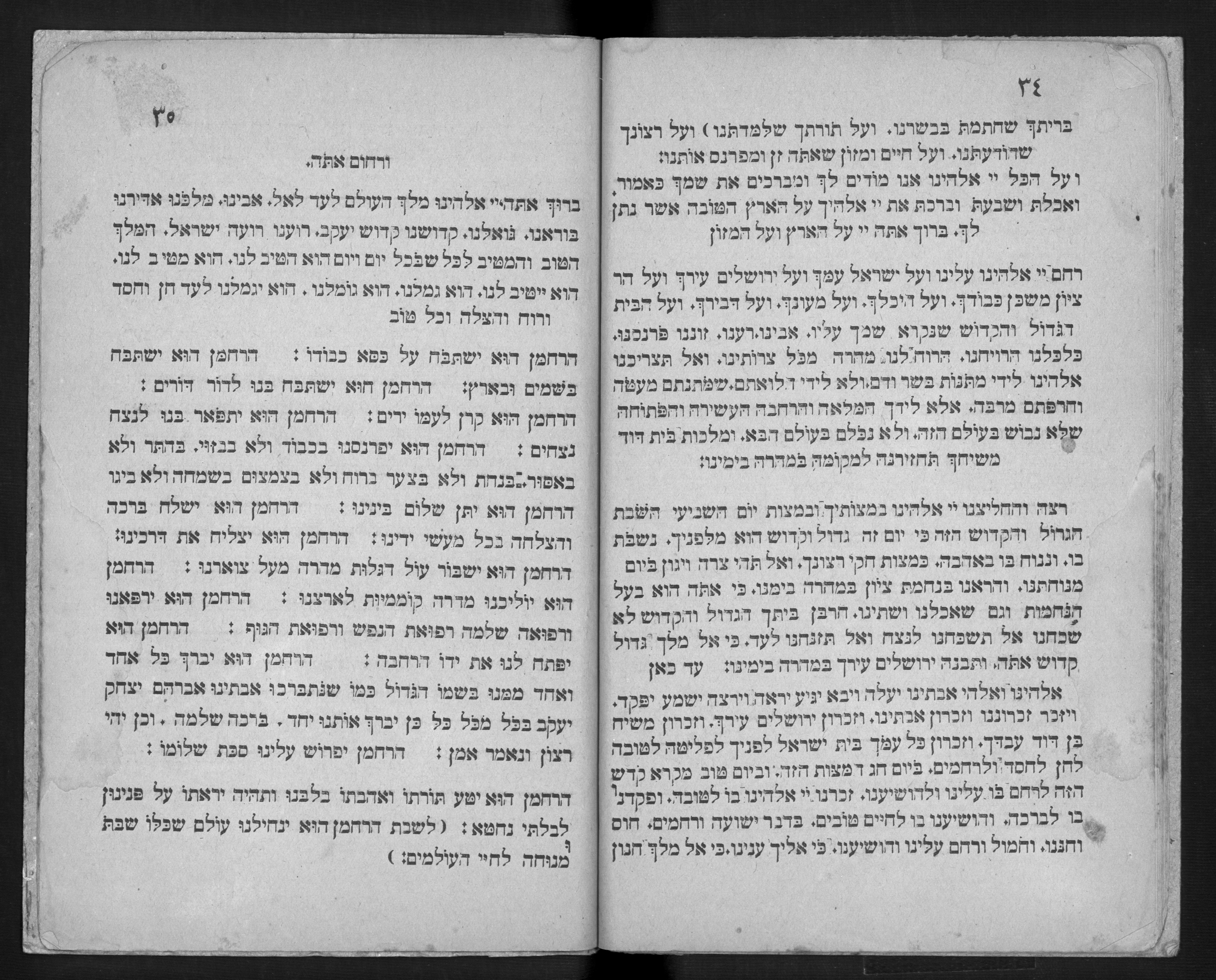

The scriptural source for the requirement to recite a blessing after a meal is Deuteronomy 8:10 "When you have eaten and are satisfied, you shall bless the LORD your God for the good land which He gave you". The process is often referred to as bentsching; the word "bentsch" means to bless.

Birkat Hamazon is made up of four blessings. The first three blessings are regarded as required by scriptural law:

1. The food: A blessing of thanks for the food was traditionally composed by Moses (Berakhot 48b) in gratitude for the manna which the Children of Israel ate in the wilderness during the Exodus from Egypt.
2. The land: A blessing of thanks for the Land of Israel, is attributed to Joshua after he led the Jewish people into Israel.
3. Jerusalem: A blessing asking God to speedily rebuild the holy city of Jerusalem, is ascribed to King David, who established it as the capital of Israel and King Solomon, who built the Temple in Jerusalem.
4. God's goodness: A blessing of thanks for God's goodness, written by Rabban Gamliel in Yavneh. The obligation to recite this blessing is generally regarded as a rabbinic obligation.

Rabbi Abraham Isaac Kook described the order of these four blessings as a "ladder of prayer," as we raise our sights and aspirations. The first blessing refers to one's personal needs; the second, the physical needs of the nation (through the Land of Israel); the third, the nation's spiritual aspirations (Jerusalem and the Temple); and the fourth blessing, our ultimate aspiration to be a “light unto the nations.”

The statutory birkat hamazon ends at the end of these four blessings, with the words, al yechasrenu. After these four blessings, there is a series of short prayers, each beginning with the word Harachaman (the Merciful One), which ask for God's compassion.

There are several known texts for birkat hamazon. The most widely available is the Ashkenazic. There are also Sephardic, Yemenite and Italian versions. All of these texts follow the same structure described above, but the wording varies. In particular, the Italian version preserves the ancient practice of commencing the third blessing with Nachamenu on Shabbat, and concluding "Menachem ami Yisrael be-vinyan Yerushalayim.

=== Preliminary psalms ===
- On weekdays, some recite Psalm 137, Al Naharot Bavel (By the rivers of Babylon) before Birkat Hamazon. This psalm describes the reactions of the Jews in exile as would have been expressed during the Babylonian captivity (See Mishna Berura quoting the Shelah).
- Psalm 126 Shir Hama'alot (Song of Ascents), which expresses the Jewish hope of return to Zion following their final redemption, is widely recited by Ashkenazi Jews before Birkat Hamazon on Shabbat, Jewish holidays, and certain other days or special occasions (such as weddings, Brit Millah, Pidyon HaBen). Some follow this by two or four additional verses from Psalms (145:21; 115:18; 118:1; 106:2); this addition is known as Tehillat Hashem after its first words, and is based on teachings by the Arizal. (The rumor that these verses were added in order to neutralize the allegedly "Zionist" implications of Psalm 126 is incorrect, as the verses were already recited in the 1600s.) Some Spanish and Portuguese Jews precede Birkat Hamazon with "Ein Keloheinu" on Shabbat and holidays.
- In the Italian rite, Shir shel yom of that day is recited, followed by Psalm 67 prior to Birkat Hamazon.
- Tzur Mishelo Achalnu is sung in some communities as "an introduction to the Grace after Meals in all joyous occasions." Whereas it is commonly found among the songs printed for singing Friday night, among those who use it for zimun it is never sung in the middle of a meal, since it would signal the meal's end.

=== Shabbat and Holidays ===
Additional sections are added on special occasions.

- On Shabbat the retzei paragraph is recited, just before the end of the third blessing. In some rite (Italian nusach as well as the practice of the Vilna Gaon the opening and conclusion of the blessing is changed on the Sabbath as well.
- On Jewish holidays, the ya'aleh ve-Yavo paragraph is added in the same place
- On Hanukkah and Purim al ha-Nissim is added to the middle of the second blessing.

If one forgets Retzei or ya'aleh ve-Yavo, one inserts a short blessing before the fourth blessing. If this is also forgotten, then at the first two meals of Shabbat and major holidays (with the possible exception of the Rosh Hashanah day meal or other Festival meals for women), one must repeat the entire Birkat Hamazon. At later meals, or on Rosh Chodesh or Chol Hamoed, nothing need be done.

If one forgets al ha-Nissim, one does not repeat Birkat Hamazon, although one recites a special Harachaman toward the very end, followed by the paragraph Bimei, which describes the respective holidays. If this prayer is also forgotten, nothing need be done. However, according to some, one needs to repeat Birkat Hamazon if they forget al ha-Nissim at the Purim Seudah.

=== Sheva Brachot ===
When birkat hamazon takes place at the Sheva Brachot (seven blessings) following a traditional Jewish marriage, in Ashkenazic communities special opening lines reflecting the joy of the occasion are added to the zimmun (invitation to grace) beginning with Devai Haser; in all communities Sheha-Simchah bi-m'ono is added. At the conclusion of birkat hamazon, a further seven special blessings are recited. While the seven blessings can only be recited with Panim Chadashot (new people who hadn't been at previous celebrations) and in the presence of a minyan, Devai Haser can be recited even without these requirements as long as there is a Zimmun. Furthermore, according to Talmudic law, Sheha-Simchah bi-m'ono (and presumably Devai Haser) can be recited for up to thirty days, or even a year if the meal was made specifically in honor of the couple; nevertheless, this is not practiced today.

=== Brit milah ===
At birkat hamazon concluding the celebratory meal of a brit milah (ritual circumcision), in the Eastern Ashkenazic rite, additional introductory lines, known as Nodeh Leshimcha, are added at the beginning and special ha-Rachaman prayers are inserted. In the Western Ashkenazic rite, the Zimmun is recited as normal without any additions, but a long piyyut from Ephraim of Bonn is inserted in the middle of the second blessing; special ha-Rachaman prayers are added, but they are different from those of the Eastern Ashkenazic rite.

=== House of Mourning ===
According to Isaac ben Dorbolo, a mourner is not counted for zimmun or minyan on the first day of mourning. When birkat hamazon takes place in a shiva house, the ordinary call to prayer is replaced with "Let us bless the Comforter of Mourners, of whose food we have eaten," and congregants respond with "Blessed be the Comforter of Mourners, of whose food we have eaten, and by whose produce do we live. According to Isaac ben Darbolo, an additional prayer should be added after the Rachem blessing: "Comfort, O God, the mourners of Zion and the mourners of Jerusalem, and all those who are comforting themselves because of this loss. Comfort away their mourning, and cheer them from their sadness. As it is said, "Just as a man is comforted by his mother, so I will comfort you, and in Jerusalem you will be comforted." Darbolo, among others, also writes that the Boneh blessing should be altered to conclude, "Blessed are you, O Lord, Comforter of Mourners and Builder of Jerusalem", but other authorities disagree. Darbolo also adds a Harachaman for mourners: "The Merciful One is a true God and an honest judge, He deals fairly and He takes fairly, and He has absolute power in His world to do as He wills, for all of His ways are just. And we are His people and His servants. We are always obligated to praise Him and to bless Him. End this evil and our mourning. The mender of Israel's breaches will mend this breach of ours for life and peace."

=== Abbreviated text ===
An abbreviated text is sometime used when time is lacking. It contains the four essential blessings in a somewhat shortened form, with fewer preliminaries and additions. In liberal branches of Judaism, there is no standard text to be recited and customs vary accordingly. Many Sephardi Jews, especially Spanish and Portuguese Jews often sing a hymn in Spanish (not Ladino as is commonly assumed), called Bendigamos, before or after birkat hamazon. An additional abbreviated form of birkat hamazon in Ladino, called Ya Comimos, may also be said.

== Zimmun ==
According to Halakha when a minimum of three adult Jewish males eat bread as part of a meal together they are obligated to form a mezuman (a "prepared gathering") with the addition of a few extra opening words whereby one man "invites" the others to join him in birkat hamazon. (This invitation is called a zimmun). When those present at the meal form a minyan (a quorum of ten adult Jewish men) there are further additions to the invitation. A Zimmun of 10 is called a Zimmun B'Shem.

=== Women ===
The Talmud states that women are obligated to say birkat hamazon and that accordingly, three women can constitute a zimmun and lead it. Accordingly, the Shulchan Aruch rules that three women may choose to make a zimmun among themselves, but are not required to do so. However, ten women cannot make the Zimmun B'Shem, and men and women cannot combine to form the three members of an ordinary zimmun. If three men and three women are present, the three men make the zimmun, and the women are required to answer to it.

=== Large gatherings ===
According to the one opinion in the Talmud, there are special versions of the zimmun if birkat hamazon is said by at least 100, 1000 or 10000 seated at one meal. When 100 are present, the leader says "Blessed is HaShem our God, of Whose we have eaten and of Whose goodness we have lived", and the group responds "Blessed is HaShem our God, of Whose we have eaten, and of Whose goodness we have lived." When 1000 are present, the leader of the Zimmun says "Let us bless HaShem our God, the God of Israel, of Whose we have eaten, and of Whose goodness we have lived", and the crowd responds, "Blessed is HaShem our God, the God of Israel, of Whose we have eaten, and of Whose goodness we have lived." When at least 10000 are present, the leader of the zimmun says "Let us bless Hashem our God, the God of Israel, who dwells among the cherubim, of Whose we have eaten, and of Whose goodness we have lived," and the multitude responds, "Blessed is Hashem our God, the God of Israel, who dwells among the cherubim, of Whose we have eaten, and of Whose goodness we have lived." However, the Shulchan Aruch rules like the other opinion in the Talmud and we do not use any of these variations.

=== Cup of Blessing ===
The practice of a cup of blessing is mentioned in the Talmud, and technically it can be done anytime Birkat Hamazon is recited, even by an individual. However, common practice is to use a cup only when there is a zimmun, in which case the person leading the zimmun recites the blessings over the cup of wine called the kos shel beracha (cup of blessing). It is more commonly done on Shabbat and Jewish Holidays, and almost universally done at meals celebrating special events. At a Passover Seder, the cup of blessing is drunk by everyone present, and functions as the "Third Cup".

=== Dvar Torah ===
Many have the custom - especially after a Shabbat meal - of sharing a Dvar Torah ("word of Torah"; Yiddish, "vort"), before the invitation. This is based on Pirkei Avot 3:3: "If three have eaten at one table, and have spoken there words of Torah, [it is] as if they had eaten at the table of the All-Present, blessed be He..."

== Mayim Acharonim ==
There is a practice in many Orthodox communities to wash the hands before reciting birkat hamazon. This practice is called mayim acharonim (final waters). While the Talmud and Shulchan Aruch rule this practice to be obligatory, Tosafot and other sources rule it to be unnecessary in current circumstances, and thus many do not perform the practice.

== Bentschers ==
Bentschers (/ˈbɛntʃər/; or benchers, birkhonim, birkhon, birchon, birchonim) are small Birkat Hamazon booklets usually handed out at bar and bat mitzvahs, weddings and other celebratory events. Traditionally, the cover of the bentscher is customized to reflect the event. Some bentschers now feature photography of Israel throughout. There are several services currently available that customize the bentscher using graphics, logos and/or photographs. They often contain other texts such as kiddush and the Shabbat zemirot, in addition to Birkat Hamazon itself.

In the early modern era (1563-1780), Birkat Hamazon was used the title for a book that included a wider variety of prayers that are not part of the daily prayer routine, such as the wedding ceremony and eruv tavshilin, in addition to Birkat Hamazon and kiddush and zemirot.

== Traditions ==
The Talmud relates that at the time of the Resurrection of the Dead, a special feast will take place. Abraham, Isaac, Jacob, Moses and Joshua will all claim unworthiness to lead the grace and the Cup of Blessing will pass to King David, who will accept the honour.

== Origin ==
The giving of thanks for the food received dates back to the first Jewish Patriarch, Abraham. A Midrash says that his tent for hospitality had openings on all four sides. He invited guests to bless the Heavenly source of the food. If they refused, he told them that they would have to pay 10 gold coins for bread, ten for wine and ten for hospitality. To their amazement for the excessive price he replied that that price corresponded to those delights difficult to find in the desert; then they accepted God and thanked Him.

== See also ==
- List of Jewish prayers and blessings
