= Lamb of God =

Title for Jesus

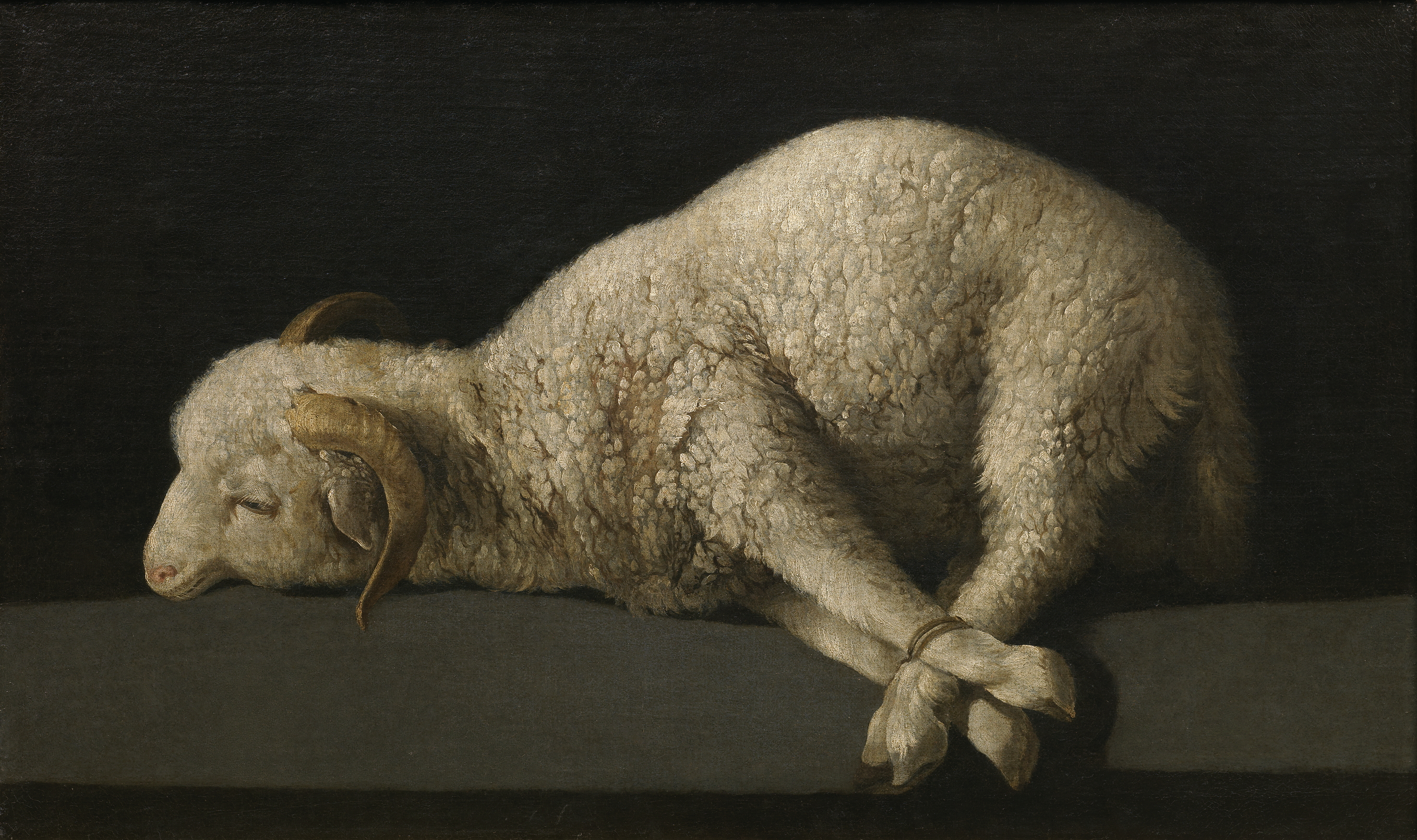
Agnus Dei c. 1635–1640, by Francisco de Zurbarán, Prado Museum

Lamb of God (Greek: Ἀμνὸς τοῦ Θεοῦ, romanized: Amnòs toû Theoû; Latin: Agnus Dei, Ecclesiastical Latin: [ˈaɲ.ɲus ˈde.i]) is a title for Jesus that appears in the Gospel of John. It appears at John 1:29, where John the Baptist sees Jesus and exclaims, "Behold the Lamb of God who takes away the sin of the world." It appears again in John 1:36.

Christian doctrine holds that a divine Jesus chose to suffer crucifixion at Calvary to save the world from its sins. He was given up by divine Father, as an "agent and servant of God" in carrying away the sins of the world. In Christian theology the Lamb of God is viewed as both foundational and integral to the message of Christianity.

A lion-like lamb that rises to deliver victory after being slain appears several times in the Book of Revelation. It is also referred to in Pauline writings; 1 Corinthians 5:7 suggests that Saint Paul intends to refer to the death of Jesus, who is the Paschal Lamb, using the theme found in Johannine writings.

The Lamb of God title is widely used in Christian prayers. The Latin version, Agnus Dei, and translations are a standard part of the Catholic Mass, as well as the classical Western Liturgies of the Anglican and Lutheran churches. It is also used in liturgy and as a form of contemplative prayer. The Agnus Dei also forms a part of the musical setting for the Mass.

As a visual motif the lamb has been most often represented since the Middle Ages as a standing haloed lamb with a foreleg cocked "holding" a pennant with a red cross on a white ground, though many other ways of representing it have been used. In Islam, the concept of a sacrificial lamb is central to the Islamic festival of Eid al-Adha, which commemorates Prophet Ibrahim's willingness to sacrifice his son as an act of obedience to God. God provided a ram as a substitute at the last moment, which is now celebrated annually through the ritual sacrifice of an animal, such as a sheep or goat.

== Gospel of John ==
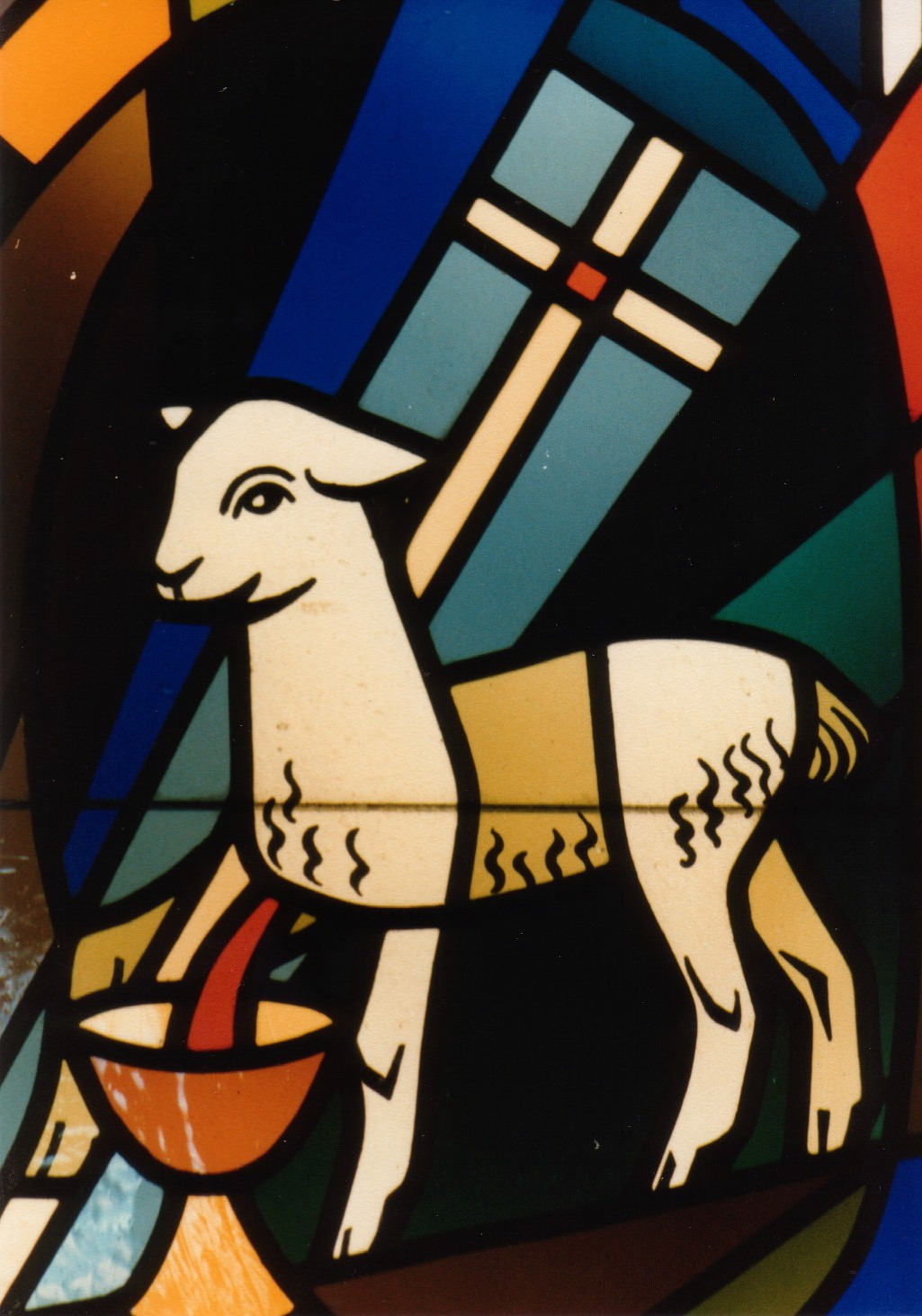
Lamb bleeding into the Holy Chalice, carrying the vexillum

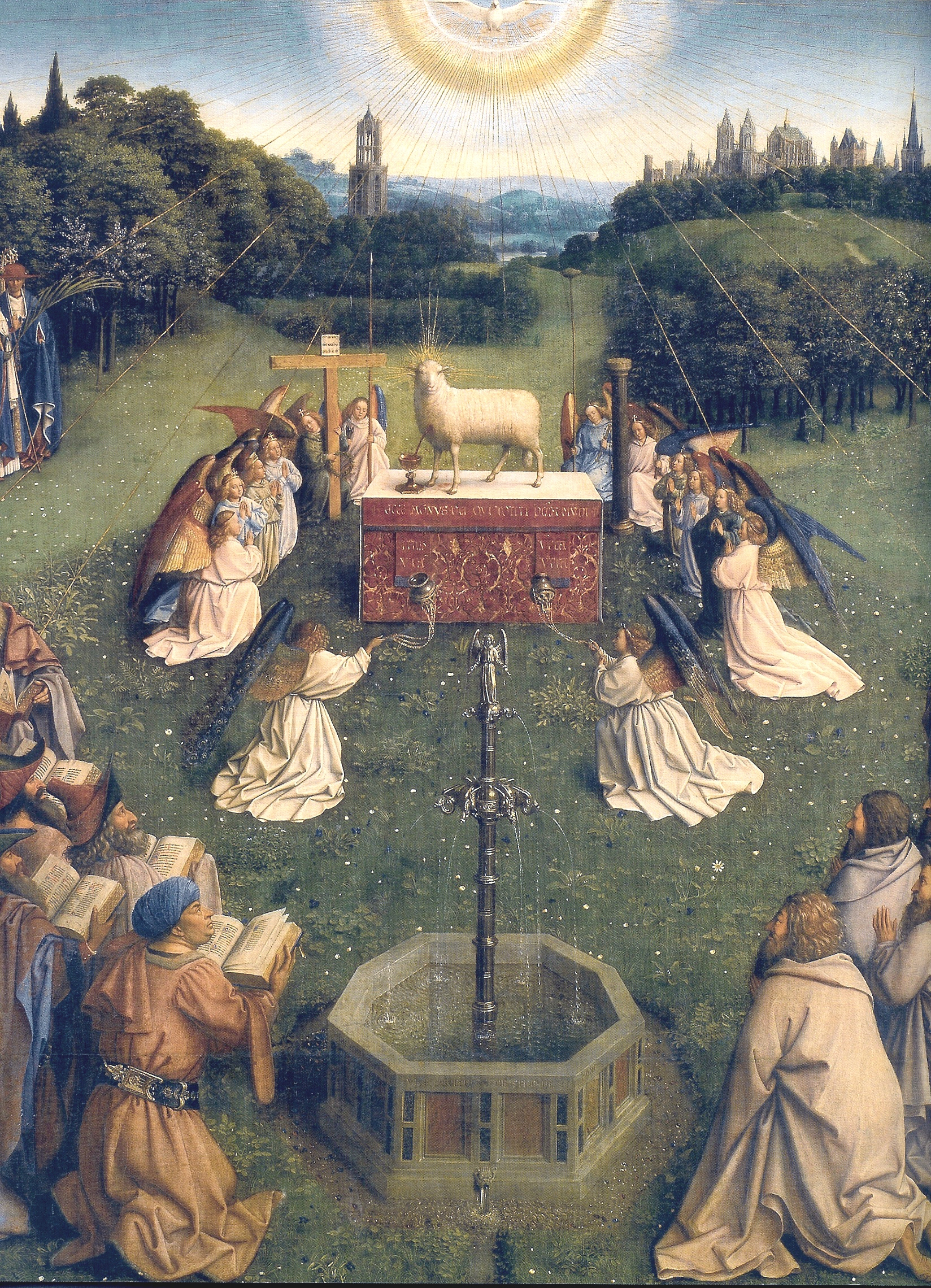
Adoration of the Mystic Lamb, with gushing blood, detail of the Ghent Altarpiece, Jan van Eyck, c. 1432

The title Lamb of God for Jesus appears in the Gospel of John, with the initial proclamation: "Behold the Lamb of God who takes away the sin of the world" in John 1:29, the title reaffirmed the next day in John 1:36. The second use of the title Lamb of God takes place in the presence of the first two apostles of Jesus, who immediately follow him, address him as Rabbi with respect and later in the narrative bring others to meet him.

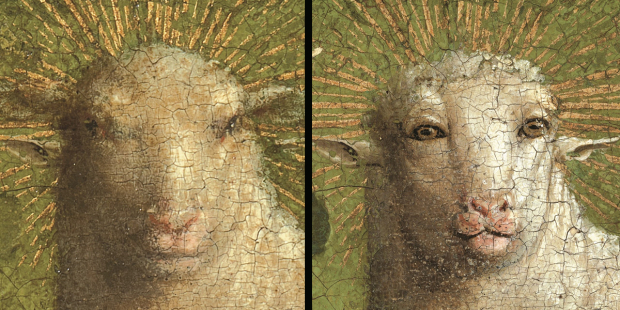
Closeup of the restored Adoration of the Mystic Lamb. The face of the Lamb was painted over with a more animal-like appearance (left). The originally intended version (right) has unusually humanoid features, with distinct ears and forward-facing eyes that appear to look directly at the viewer of the panel.

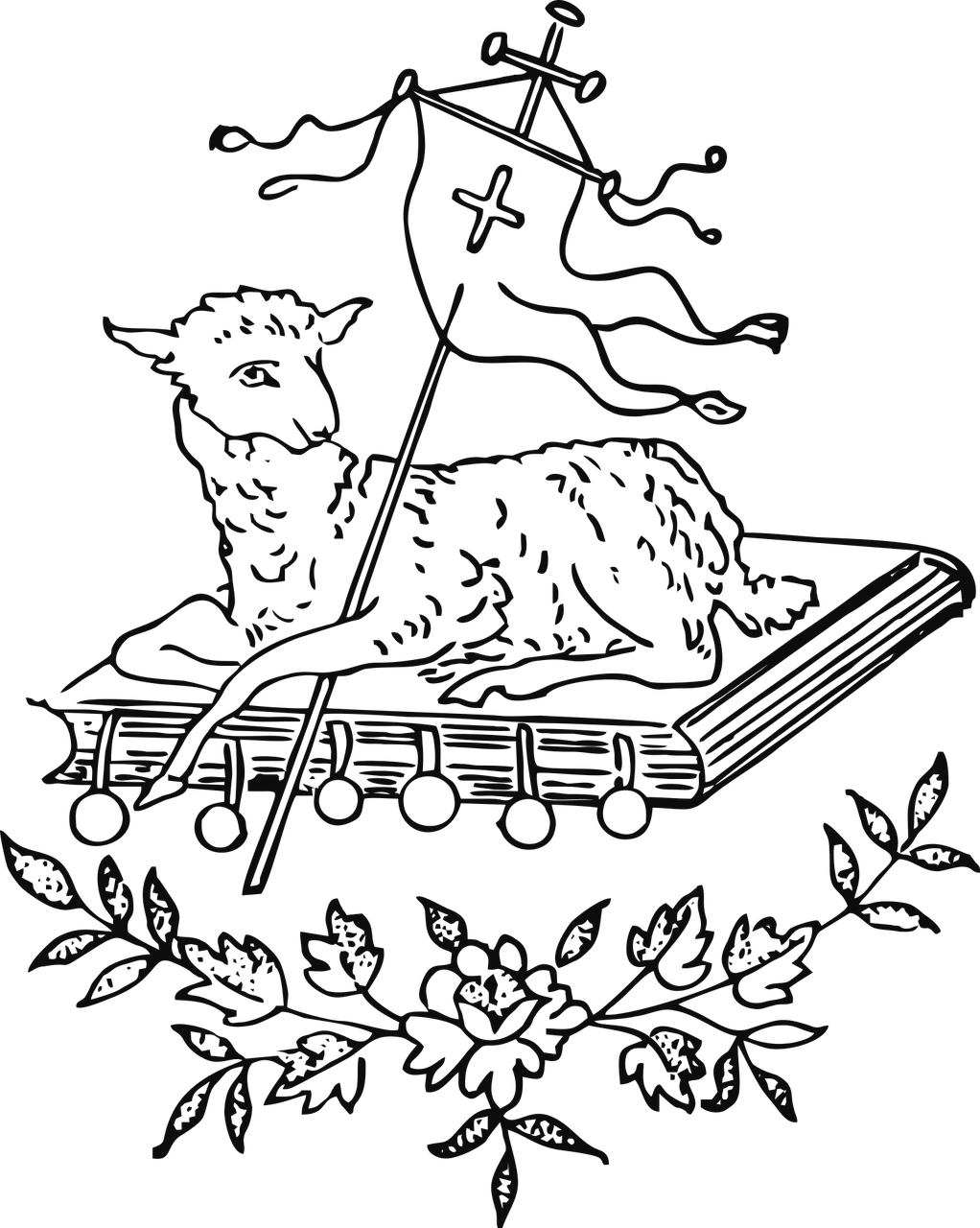
Agnus Dei with the vexillum

These two proclamations of Jesus as the Lamb of God closely bracket the Baptist's other John 1:34: "I have borne witness that this is the Son of God". From a Christological perspective, these proclamations and the descent of the Holy Spirit as a dove in John 1:32 reinforce each other to establish the divine element of the Person of Christ. In Johannine Christology the proclamation "who takes away the sin of the world" begins the unfolding of the salvific theme of the redemptive and sacrificial death of Jesus followed by his resurrection which is built upon in other proclamations such as "this is indeed the Saviour of the world" uttered by the Samaritans in John 4:42.

== Book of Revelation ==
The Book of Revelation includes over twenty-nine references to a lion-like lamb ("slain but standing") which delivers victory in a manner reminiscent of the resurrected Christ. In the first appearance of the lamb in Revelation (5:1–7) only the lamb (which is of the tribe of Judah, and the root of David) is found worthy to take the judgment scroll from God and break the seals. The reference to the lamb in Revelation 5:6 relates it to the Seven Spirits of God which first appear in Revelation 1:4 and are associated with Jesus who holds them along with seven stars.

In Rev. 19:6-9, the lamb is said to be having a wedding feast, and that his bride's pure linen garment is said to be the "righteous acts of the saints." A wedding feast, in Jewish law, is an obligatory banquet after a Jewish wedding. In Jewish eschatology, the messiah will hold a wedding feast with the righteous of every nation (people), called a Seudat Chiyat HaMatim, wherein the messiah and his wedding guests will feast on the flesh of the Leviathan. The identity of the lamb's bride is not specified in the passage, but the Christian Church is referred to as the bride of Christ elsewhere in the New Testament.

In Revelation 21:14 the lamb is said to have twelve apostles. The handing of the scroll (i.e. the book containing the names of those who will be saved) to the risen lamb signifies the change in the role of the lamb. In Calvary, the lamb submitted to the will of the Father to be slain, but now is trusted with the judgment of mankind.

From the outset, the book of Revelation is presented as a "revelation of Jesus Christ" and hence the focus on the lamb as both redeemer and judge presents the dual role of Jesus: he redeems man through self-sacrifice, yet calls man to account on the day of judgment.

== Christology ==
The concept of the Lamb of God fits well within John's "agent Christology", in which sacrifice is made as an agent of God or servant of God for the sake of eventual victory.

The theme of a sacrificial lamb which rises in victory as the Resurrected Christ was employed in early Christology. For example, in 375 Saint Augustine wrote: "Why a lamb in his passion? Because he underwent death without being guilty of any iniquity. Why a lion in his passion? Because in being slain, he slew death. Why a lamb in his resurrection? Because his innocence is everlasting. Why a lion in his resurrection? Because everlasting also is his might."

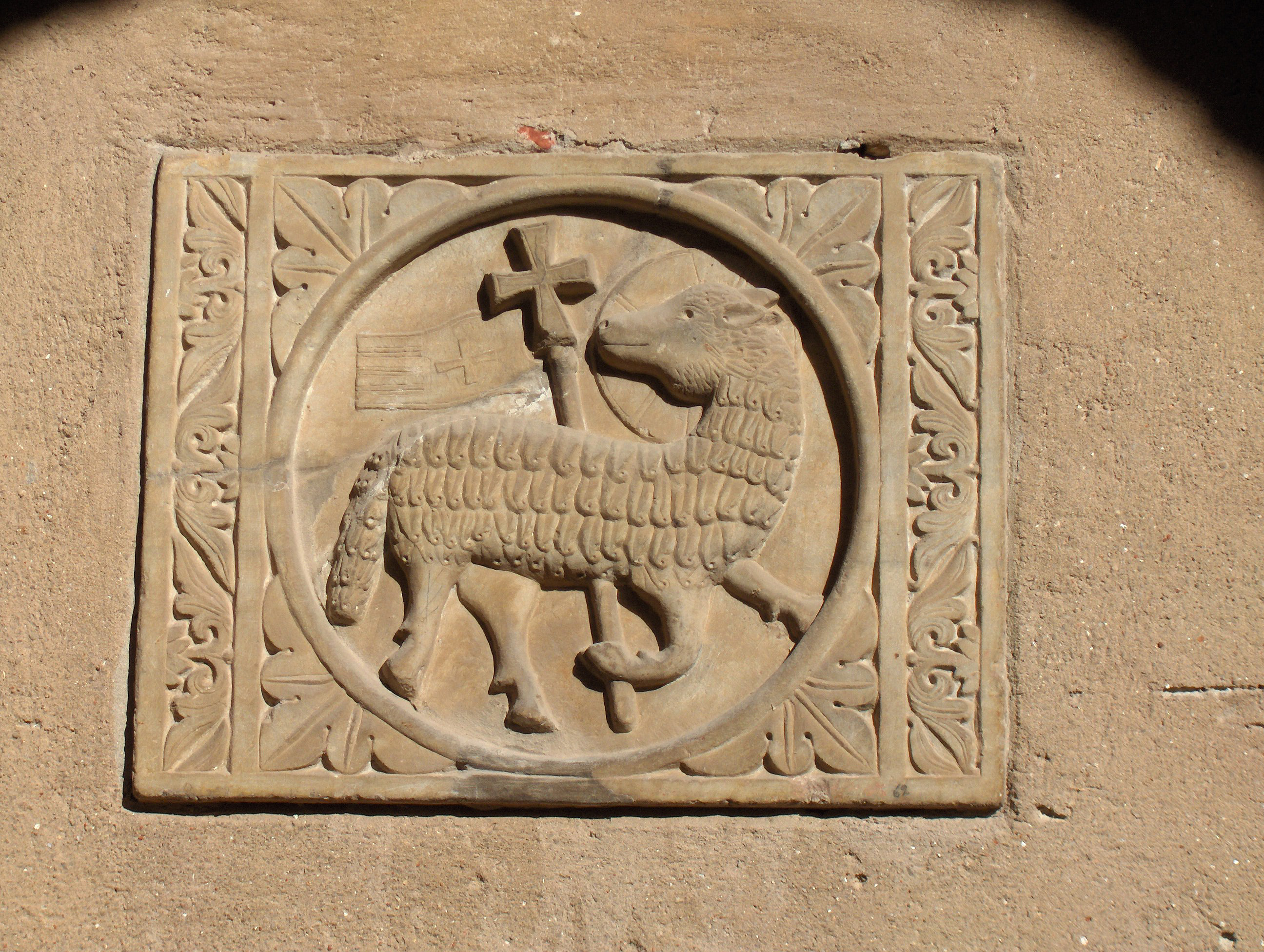
Medieval Agnus Dei with halo and cross; half-relief on the wall of the atrium Euphrasian Basilica, Poreč, Croatia

The 11th century Christology of Saint Anselm of Canterbury specifically disassociates the Lamb of God from the Old Testament concept of a scapegoat, which is subjected to punishment for the sins of others without knowing it or willing it. Anselm emphasized that as Lamb of God, Jesus chose to suffer in Calvary as a sign of his full obedience to the will of the Father.

John Calvin presented the same Christological view, of "The Lamb as the agent of God", by arguing that in his trial before Pilate and while at Herod's Court Jesus could have argued for his innocence, but instead remained mostly quiet and submitted to crucifixion in obedience to the Father, for he knew his role as the Lamb of God.

In modern Eastern Orthodox Christology, Sergei Bulgakov argued that the role of Jesus as the Lamb of God was "pre-eternally" determined by the Father, before the creation of the world, by considering the scenario that it would be necessary to send The Son as an agent to redeem humanity disgraced by the fall of Adam, and that this is a sign of His love.

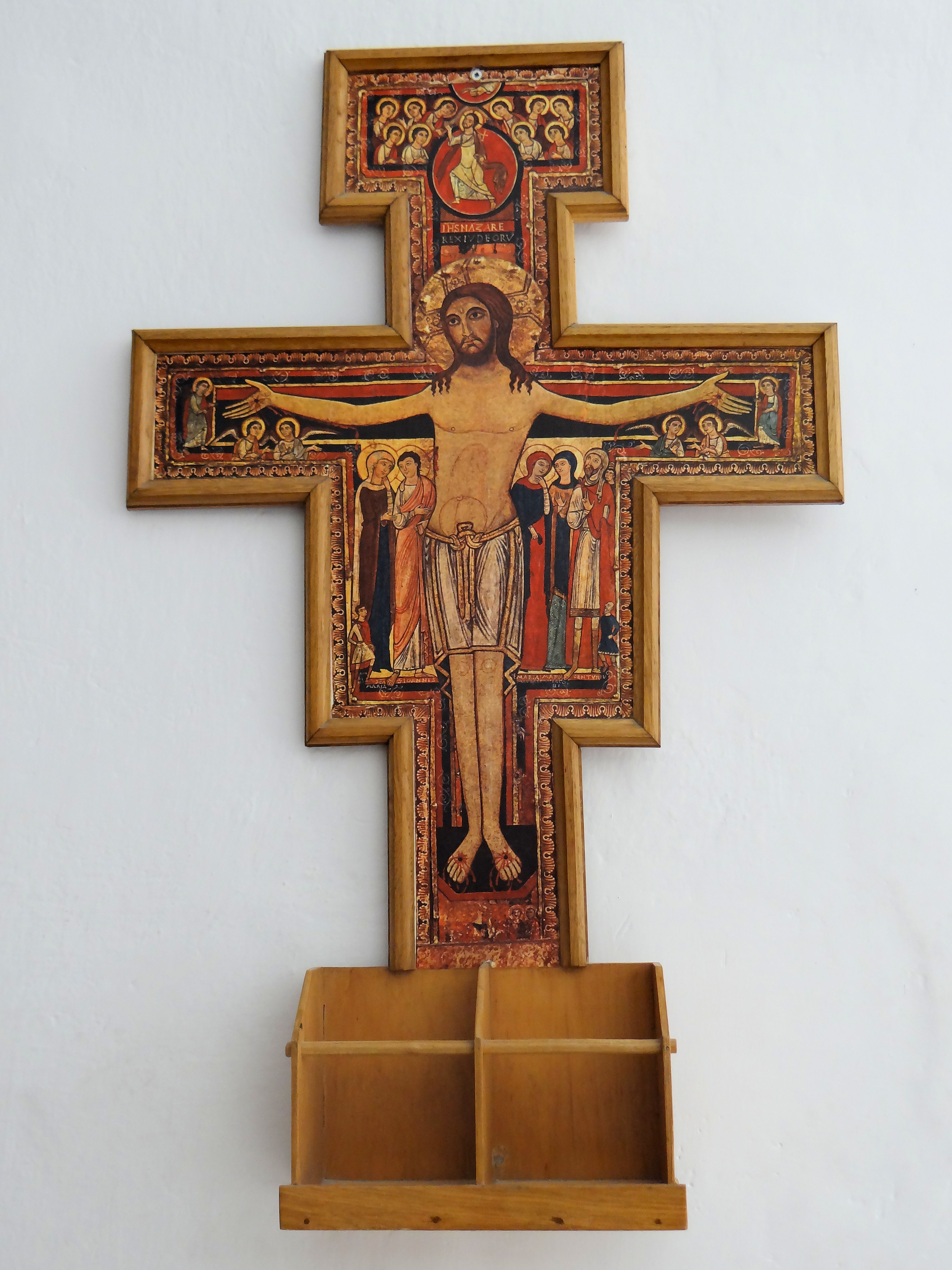
San Damiano Cross depicts the sacrificial Christ as Agnus Dei

Multiple hypotheses about the suitable symbolism for the Lamb of God have been offered, within various Christological frameworks, ranging from the interpretation of Old Testament references to those of the Book of Revelation. One view suggests the symbolism of Leviticus 16 as scapegoat, coupled with Romans 3:21–25 for atonement, while another view draws parallels with the Paschal Lamb in Exodus 12:1–4, coupled with John 1:29–36, and yet another symbolism relies on Revelation 5:5–14 in which the lamb is viewed as a lion who destroys evil. However, as above, the view adopted by Saint Anselm and John Calvin rejects the scapegoat symbolism. They view Jesus as making a knowing sacrifice as an agent of God, unlike an unwitting scapegoat.

In modern Roman Catholic Christology, Karl Rahner has continued to elaborate on the analogy that the blood of the Lamb of God, and the water flowing from the side of Christ on Calvary, had a cleansing nature, similar to baptismal water. In this analogy, the blood of the Lamb washed away the sins of humanity in a new baptism, redeeming it from the fall of Adam.

== Liturgy and music ==
Agnus Dei from Mass in G by Schubert.

In the Mass of the Roman Rite and also in the Eucharist of the Anglican Communion, the Lutheran Church, and the Western Rite of the Eastern Orthodox Church the Agnus Dei is the invocation to the Lamb of God sung or recited during the fraction of the Host. It is said to have been introduced into the Mass by Pope Sergius I (687–701).

Agnus Dei has been set to music by many composers, usually as part of a Mass setting.

== Art ==
In Christian iconography, an Agnus Dei is a visual representation of Jesus as a lamb, since the Middle Ages, usually carrying a halo and holding a cross and symbolizing the victory. This normally rests on the lamb's shoulder and is held in its right foreleg. Often the cross will have a white standard or banner suspended from it charged with a red cross (similar to St George's Cross)–though the cross may also be rendered in different colors. Sometimes the lamb is shown lying atop a book with seven seals hanging from it. This is a reference to the imagery in the Book of Revelation 5:1–13, ff. Occasionally, the lamb may be depicted bleeding from the area of the heart (Cf. Revelation 5:6), symbolizing Jesus' shedding of his blood to take away the sins of the world (Cf. John 1:29, 1:36).

In Early Christian art the symbol appears very early on. Several mosaics in churches include it, some showing a row of twelve sheep representing the apostles flanking the central Agnus Dei, as in Santi Cosma e Damiano, Rome (526–30). Agnus Dei is standing on a hill with four rivers of Paradise flowing out underneath.

The Moravian Church uses an Agnus Dei as their seal with the surrounding inscription Vicit agnus noster, eum sequamur ("Our Lamb has conquered, let us follow him").

Although the depiction of Jesus as the Lamb of God is of ancient origin, it is not used in the liturgical iconography of the Eastern Orthodox Church. The reason for this is that the depictions of Jesus in the Orthodox Church are anthropomorphic rather than symbolic, as a confession of the Orthodox belief in the Incarnation of the Logos. However, there is no objection to the application of the term "Lamb of God" to Jesus. In fact, the Host used in the Orthodox Divine Liturgy is referred to as the Lamb (Greek: άμνος, romanized: amnos; Church Slavonic: Агнец, romanized: Agniets). In 692 AD the Synod of Constantinople prohibited using a depiction of lamb as a symbol of Christ, a point which was adopted in the East but not the West.

Lamb of God is also part of Easter decorations.

== Heraldry ==
A paschal lamb is a charge used in heraldry, for example as the crest of the Davie Baronets, and is blazoned: a paschal lamb This charge is depicted as a lamb standing with body facing towards the dexter (viewer's left), with nimbus, and with head facing forwards (or turned looking backwards to sinister, termed reguardant) holding under its right foreleg a flagpole, tipped with a small cross, resting at a diagonal angle over its shoulder, flying a banner of the Cross of St. George (except in Perth's coat of arms, where it flies a banner of the Cross of St Andrew).

== Catholic sacramental ==
In the Catholic Church, an Agnus Dei is a disc of wax, stamped with an image of Jesus as a lamb bearing a cross, that is consecrated by the pope as a sacramental. These were often set in jewelry, and might be worn round the neck on a chain, or as a brooch.

== Gallery ==
The Coat of arms of Puerto Rico features the Lamb of God and other symbols including the Kingdom of Jerusalem Cross and the Catholic Monarchs initials.

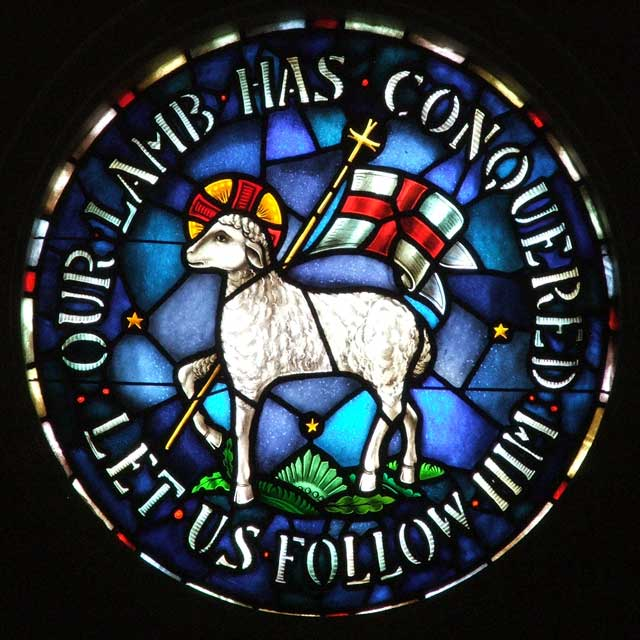
The seal of the Moravian Church, the Agnus Dei window with the Lamb of God carrying the vexillum

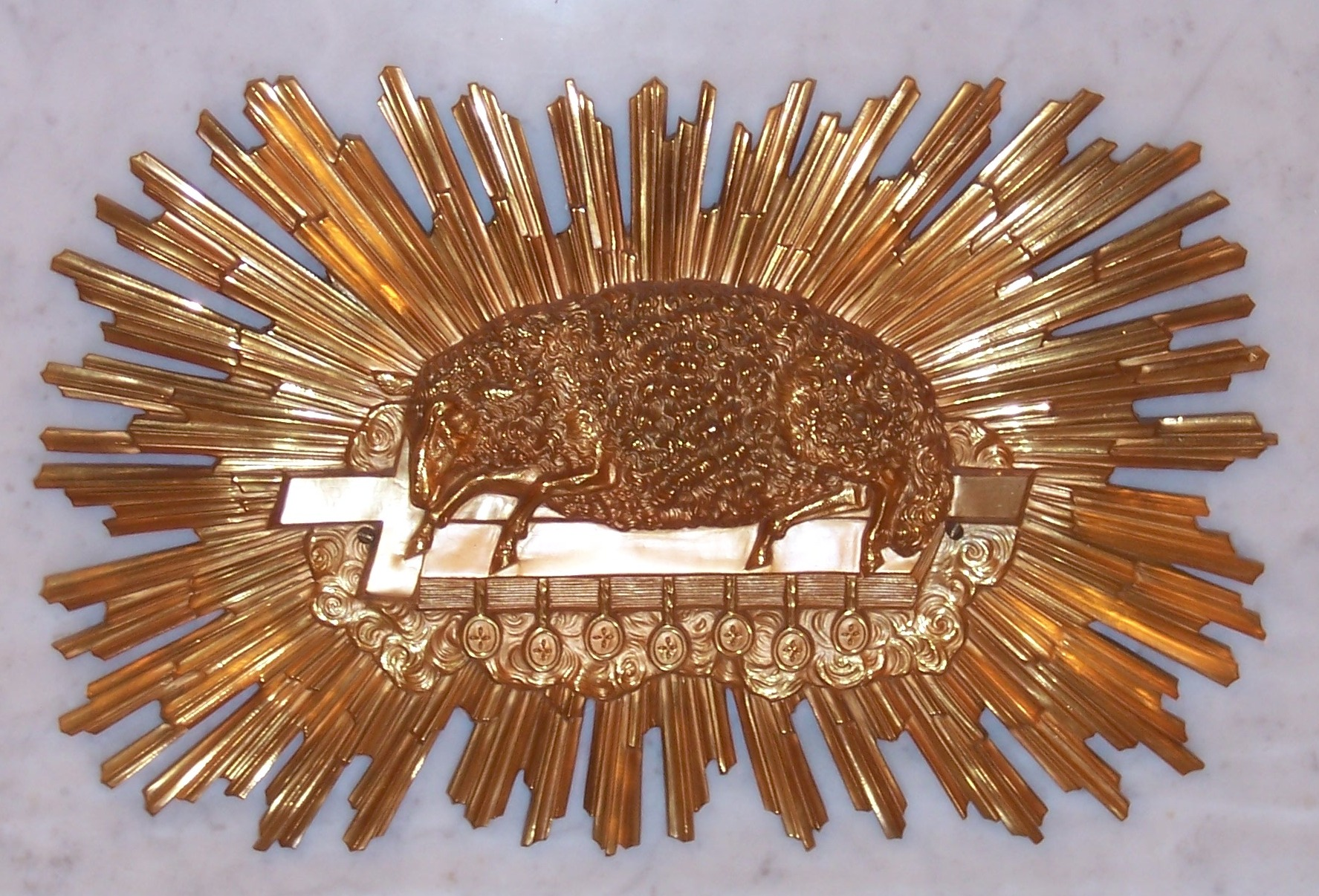
Brass Agnus Dei from altar-front in the Cathedral of the Assumption in Louisville, Kentucky

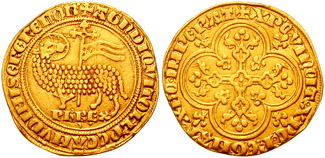
Agnus Dei on the 1311 coin of King Philip IV of France

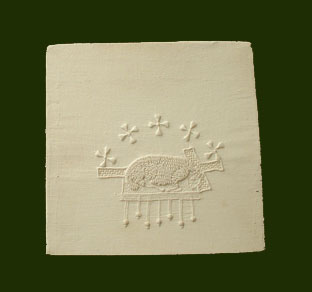
Eucharistic Pall, embroidered with the Agnus Dei reposing on the book of the Seven Seals

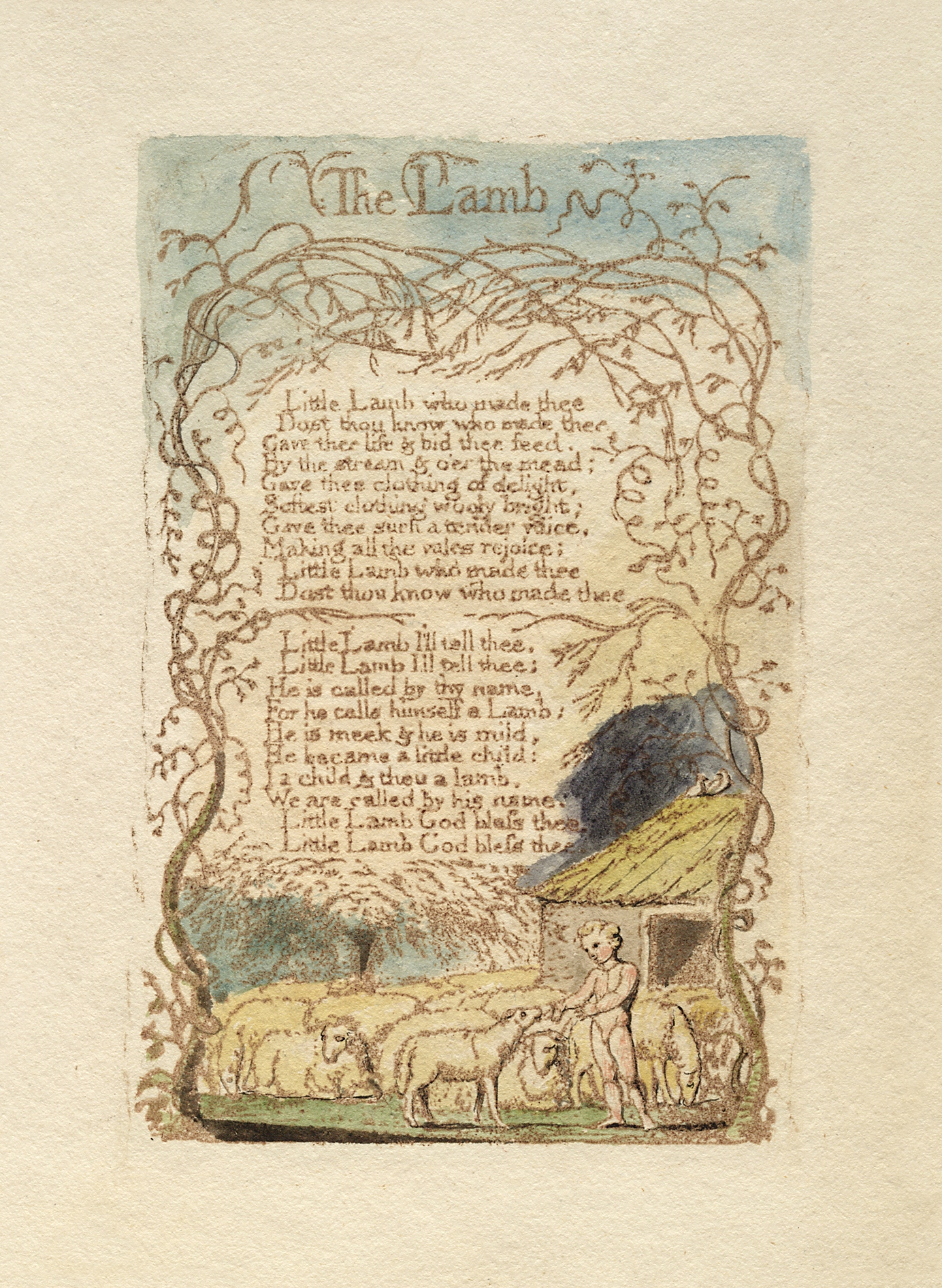
William Blake's The Lamb from his collection Songs of Innocence and of Experience

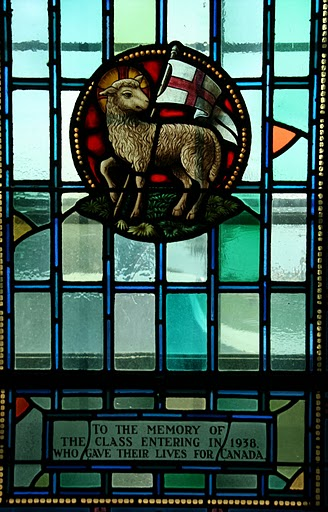
Stained glass Lamb of God carrying the vexillum, Royal Military College of Canada

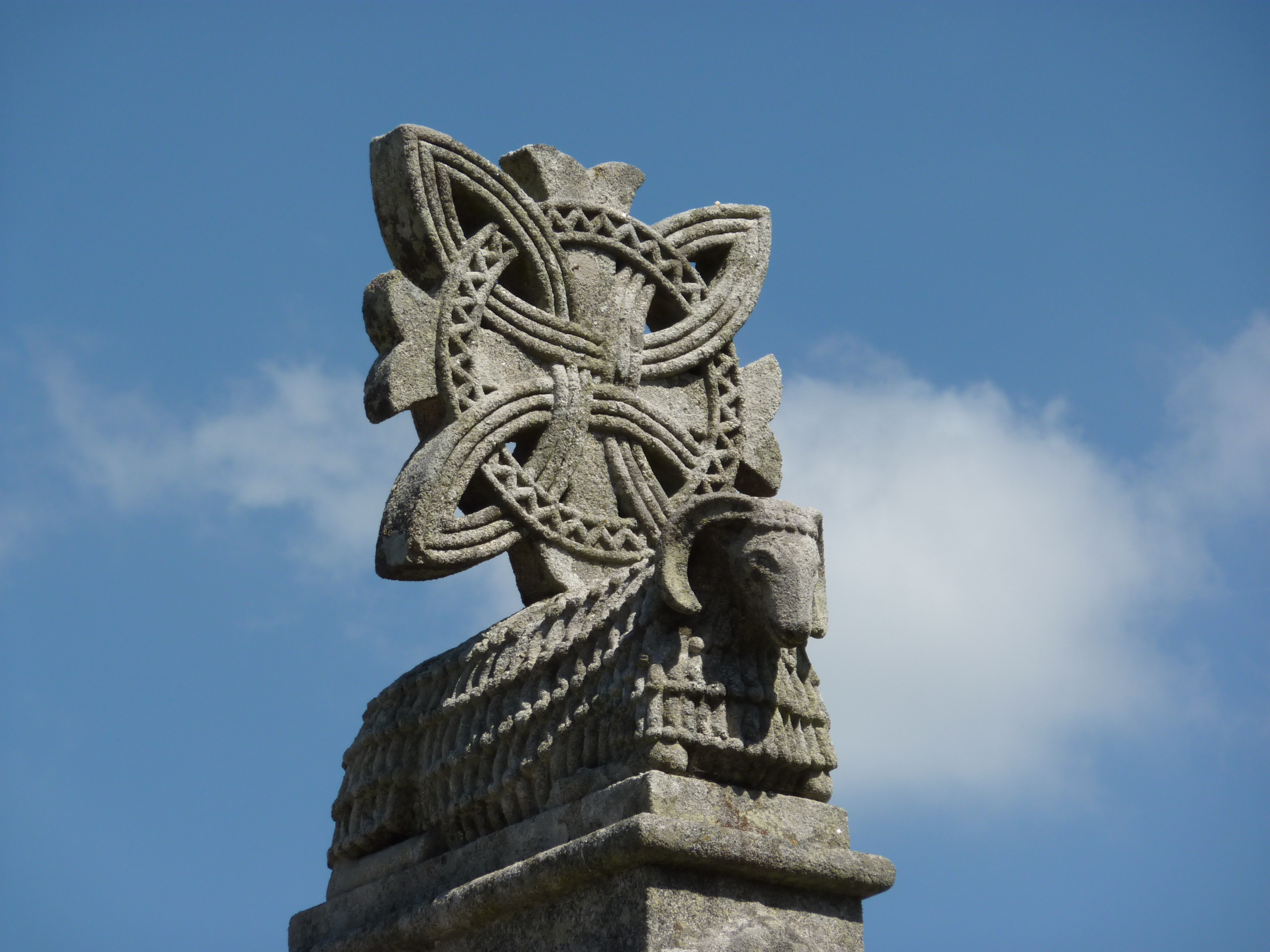
Modern copy of a Romanesque Agnus Dei, Santiago de Compostela, Galicia

The Agnus Dei on Perth, Scotland's coat of arms holds the Scottish flag.

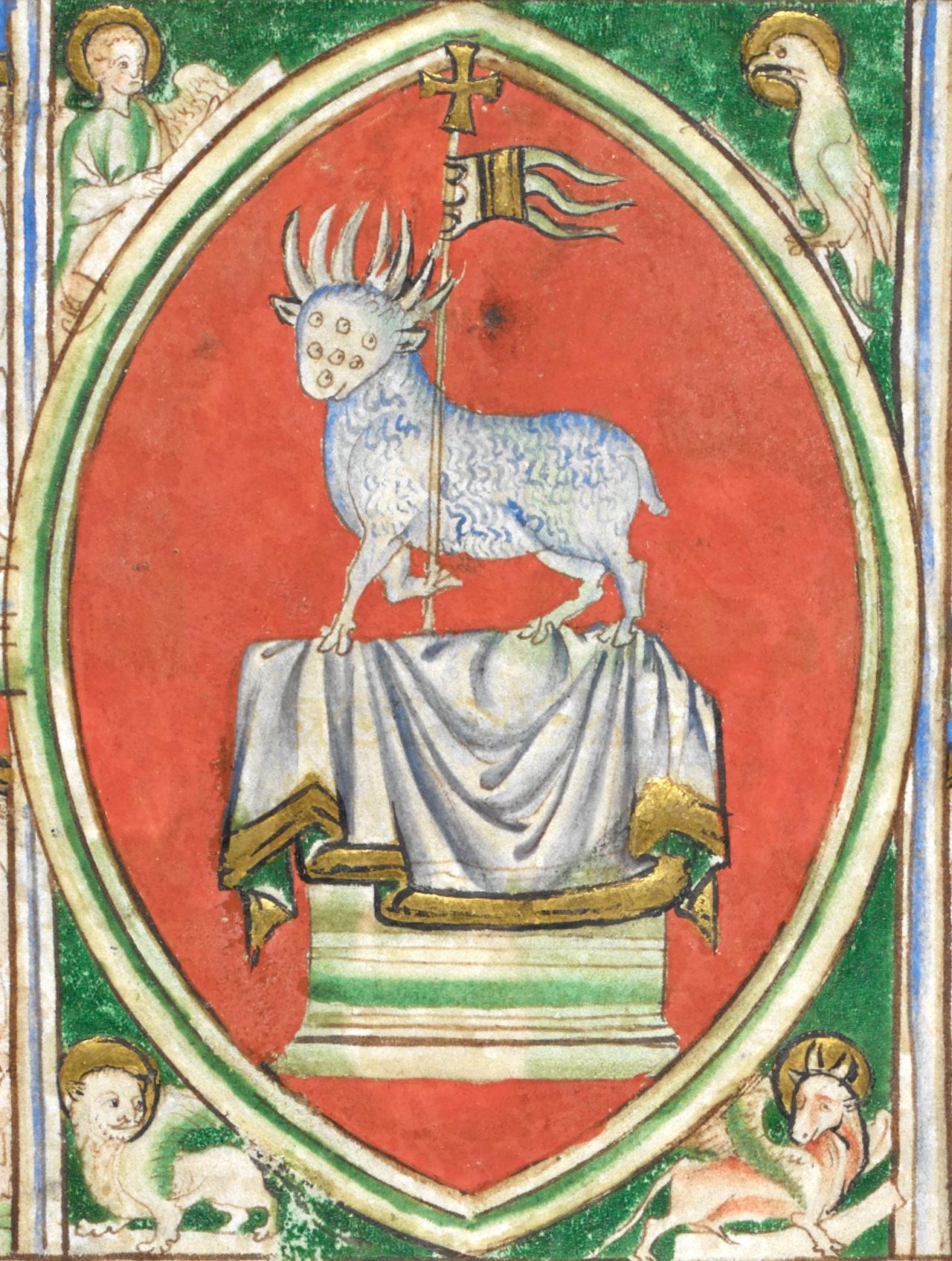
13th century depiction of a seven-eyed lamb

The Agnus Dei on the coat of arms of the Diocese of Chengdu

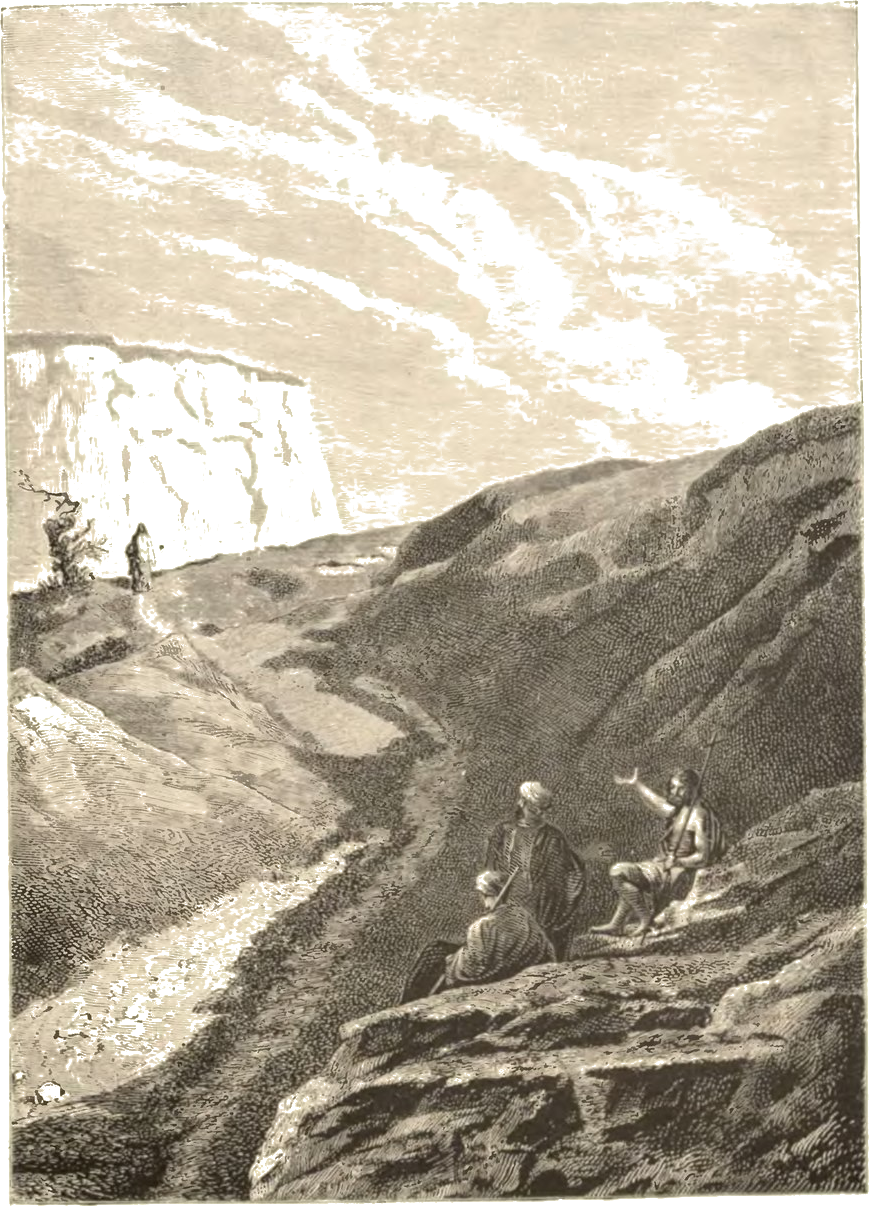
Behold the lamb of God by Alexandre Bida

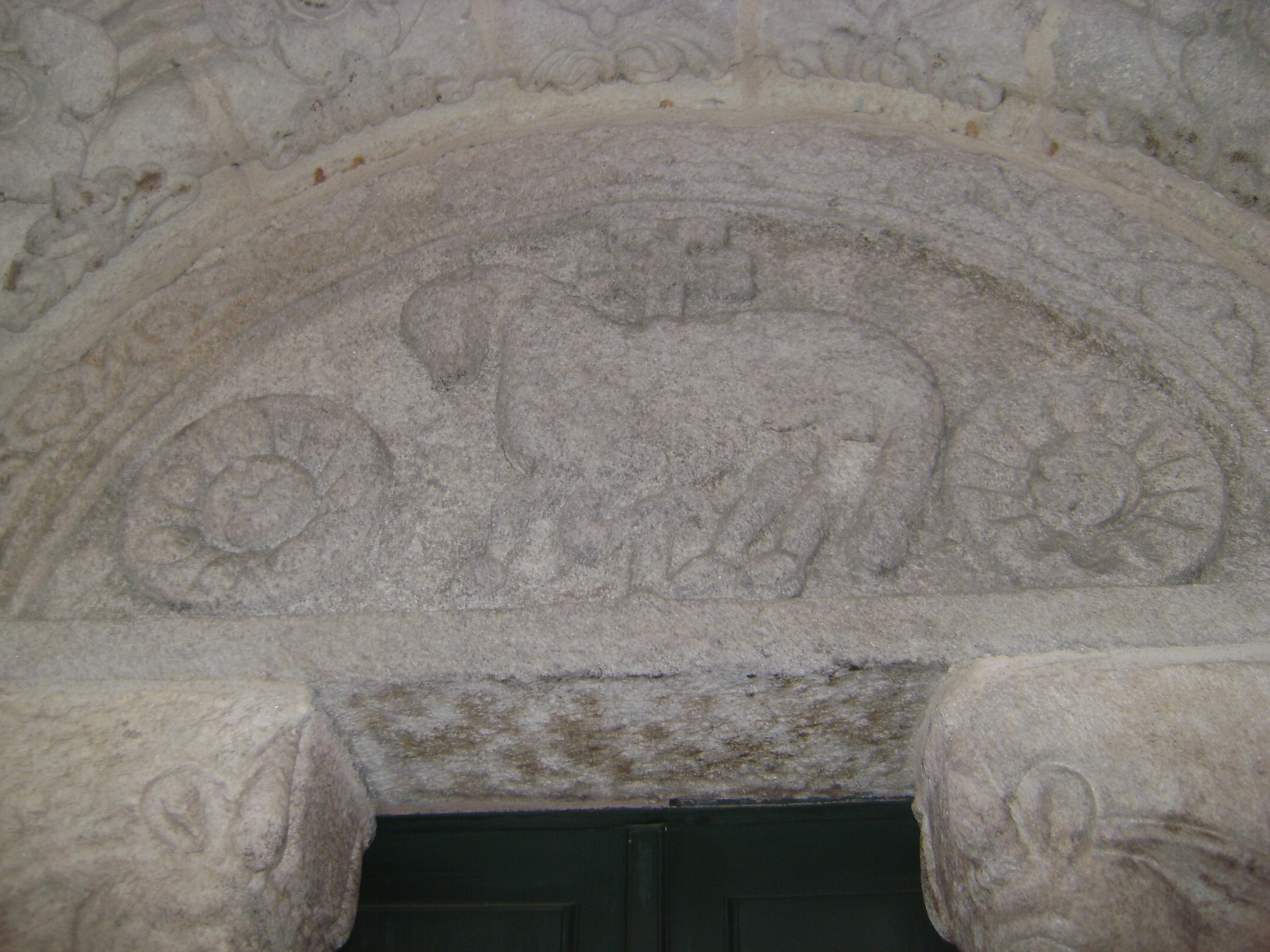
Lamb of God in church of Santiago in Coruña, Galicia, Spain

The Lamb of God in the coat of arms of Grasse, France.

== See also ==
- Binding of Isaac
- Jesus in Christianity
- Lion of Judah
- Suffering servant
