= After-Blessings =

Type of blessing in Judaism

After-blessing (Hebrew: ברכה אחרונה, romanized: Berakhah Aharonah) is a term for one of the three types of blessings that the Sages instituted to be recited after eating or drinking.

== Types of after-blessings ==
There are three main types of after-blessings:

- Birkat Hamazon (בִּרְכַּת הַמָּזוֹן) – recited after a meal that includes bread.
- Me'ein Shalosh (ברכה מעין שלוש) – recited after eating foods made from the five species of grain (when the blessing before eating was not Hamotzi), after drinking wine, and after eating fruits of the Seven Species.
- Borei Nefashot (ברכת בורא נפשות) – recited after consuming all other types of food, and drinks that are not wine.

== When eating multiple types of food ==
Reciting Birkat Hamazon exempts one from saying other after-blessings during the same meal, provided that bread was eaten. A Me’ein Shalosh blessing on fruits of the Seven Species exempts Borei Nefashot for other fruits, but not for unrelated foods or drinks.

== Minimum quantity for obligation ==
The minimum quantity that obligates an after-blessing is a kezayit (olive-sized amount) consumed within the time of kdei akhilat pras. For drinks, the required amount is a Revi'it (a quarter-log).

== After-blessings at the Passover Seder ==
At the Passover Seder, two after-blessings are recited: one is Birkat Hamazon after the meal (part of the Shulchan Orech section), and the other is Me'ein Shalosh after the third and fourth of the Four Cups of Wine (at the end of Hallel).

== After-blessings for non-food items ==
According to the Babylonian Talmud in Tractate Berakhot, one does not recite an after-blessing on things that are not food. The halakhah follows the opinion that there is no after-blessing for mitzvot, unlike the custom recorded in the Jerusalem Talmud of reciting "Blessed are You... who keeps His commandments" after removing tefillin. Similarly, no after-blessing is recited for fragrance.
