= Isaac Alexander =

German author

- Occupation: Author

Isaac Alexander was a German author. He lived in South Germany in the second half of the 18th century, and wrote on philosophical subjects from a rationalistic point of view. His works include: Von dem Dasein Gottes, die Selbstredende Vernunft, Ratisbon, 1775; Anmerkungen über die Erste Geschichte der Menschheit nach dem Zeugnisse Mosis, Nuremberg, 1782; Vereinigung der Mosaischen Gesetze mit dem Talmud, Ratisbon, 1786; Einheitsgedichte, a German translation of the Shir ha-Yiḥud, Ratisbon, 1788; Abhandlung von der Freiheit des Menschen, and Kleine Schriften, Ratisbon, 1789.
