= Bendigamos =

Bendigamos is a hymn sung after meals according to the custom of Spanish and Portuguese Jews. It has also been traditionally sung by the Jews of Turkish descent. It is similar in meaning to the Birkat Hamazon, which, according to traditional Jewish law, is recited after every meal containing bread. Bendigamos is said in addition to Birkat Hamazon, either immediately before or immediately after it. The text is in literary Spanish, not Ladino. Below is the actual text as well a translation into English by David de Sola Pool. The melody is one of the best known and loved Spanish and Portuguese melodies, used also for the Song of the Sea (in the Shabbat morning service) and sometimes in "Hallel" (on the first day of the Hebrew month and on festivals).

It is currently sung in New York's Congregation Shearith Israel during the festival of Sukkot, as well as on other occasions and at Shabbat meals at the homes of members. It is sung every Shabbat in the Spanish and Portuguese communities of Great Britain and of Philadelphia. It is also sung by the Jewish communities in the north of Brazil (Manaus and Belem), who brought the melody from Morocco in the 19th century, during the earliest Jewish immigration to the Amazon. The song probably originated among the Spanish-speaking Jews of Bordeaux, where the song is now sung in French using a translation by David Lévi Alvarès. From France the Bendigamos song was probably brought to the Dutch West-Indies (Curaçao) in the mid-nineteenth century and thence taken to New York and Amsterdam. Alternatively, the song may have originated with Sephardic Jews living in Spain, who then immigrated to Turkey, other locales in the Ottoman Empire, and the Netherlands. It may originally have been written as a secret way to say the Grace After Meals (Birkat HaMazon) after practicing Judaism in Spain and Portugal was forbidden in the fifteenth century.

Spanish:	English:
Bendigamos Bendigamos al Altísimo, Al Señor que nos crió, Démosle agradecimiento Por los bienes que nos dió. Alabado sea su Santo Nombre, Porque siempre nos apiadó. Load al Señor que es bueno, Que para siempre su merced. Bendigamos al Altísimo, Por su Ley primeramente, Que liga a nuestra raza Con el cielo continuamente, Alabado sea su Santo Nombre, Porque siempre nos apiadó. Load al Senor que es bueno, Que para siempre su merced. Bendigamos al Altísimo, Por el pan segundamente, Y también por los manjares Que comimos juntamente. Pues comimos y bebimos alegremente Su merced nunca nos faltó. Load al Señor que es bueno, Que para siempre su merced. Bendita sea la casa esta, El hogar de su presencia, Donde guardamos su fiesta, Con alegría y permanencia. Alabado sea su Santo Nombre, Porque siempre nos apiadó. Load al Señor que es bueno, Que para siempre su merced.	Let us bless Let us bless the Most High; The Lord who raised us, Let us give him thanks For the good things which he gave us. Praised be his Holy Name, Because he always took pity on us. Praise the Lord, for he is good, For his mercy is everlasting. Let us bless the Most High; First for his Law, Which binds our race With heaven continually, Praised be his Holy Name, Because he always took pity on us. Praise the Lord, for he is good, For his mercy is everlasting. Let us bless the Most High, Secondly for the bread And also for the food Which we eat together. For we have eaten and drunk happily His mercy has never failed us. Praise the Lord, for he is good, For his mercy is everlasting. Blessed be this house, The home of his presence, Where we keep his feast, With happiness and permanence. Praised be his Holy Name, Because he always took pity on us. Praise the Lord, for he is good, For his mercy is everlasting.

A final phrase is inserted at the end in Hebrew which is repeated twice:

.הוֹדוּ לַיָי כִּי־טוֹב. כּי לְעוֹלָם חַסְדּוֹ Give thanks to the Lord, for He is good. His mercy endures forever.

== Alternate text ==
There is also an alternate text, which appears to be attributable to Sephardic Jews of the Caribbean islands such as Jamaica and Barbados. While the pronunciation varies, which may affect the transliteration spelling, the text is the same.

Bendigamos	Let us bless
Bendigamos al Altisimo, Al Señor que nos creo, Demosle agradecimiento, Por los bienes que nos dio. Alabado sea su Santo Nombre, Porque siempre nos apiadó, (H)Odu (Note: The usage of Odu may be attributed to the traditional pronunciation of Jamaican English or Patois which tends to eliminate the initial 'H' sound. The Sephardic pronunciation of the Jews living in Turkey and The Ottoman Empire is to treat the Hebrew letter 'Hey (ה)" as a silent letter. Thus the silent 'H' in Hodu, rendering it as "Odu". This pronunciation applies to both versions of Bendigamos.) Ladonai ki tob, Ki leolam jasdo (Note: This use of 'j' in the transliteration is a Spanish transliteration of the 'kh' or 'ch' guttural sound of the ח of Hebrew, as in the popular toast L'chaim, or as pronounced in the name Bach (The musical composer).) Bendigamos al Altísimo, Por el pan primeramente, Y después por los manjares, Que comimos juntamente. Pues comimos y bebimos alegremente, Su merced nunca nos faltó, Load al Señor que es bueno, Que para siempre Su merced. Bendita sea la casa esta Que nunca manque en ella fiesta, Tarde, manaña y siesta, A nos y a los hijos de Israel.	Let us bless the one most high, The Lord who created us, Let us give thanks For all of the good things he gave us. Praise be his holy name For he has always had mercy on us. Blessed is the Lord for he is good, For his mercy endures forever. Blessed is the one most high, First for the bread, And then for the other foods We have eaten together. We ate and we drank happily. His mercy has never failed us. Praised is the Lord for he is good, Whose mercy endures forever. Blessed be this house It should never lack celebration, Afternoon, morning, and evening, For us and the children of Israel.
