= Judah ben Kalonymus =

Judah ben Kalonymus is the name of two members of the Kalonymus family.

- Judah ben Kalonymus ben Moses of Mainz
- Judah ben Kalonymus ben Meir of Speyer
