= Isaac ben Asher ha-Levi =

Earliest known Tosafist

Isaac ben Asher HaLevi
- רבי יצחק בן אשר הלוי
- Other name: ריב"א

Rabbi Isaac ben Asher HaLevi or Riba (ריב"א) is the earliest known Tosafist, son-in-law of Eliakim ben Meshullam and pupil of Rashi. He flourished in Speyer during the 11th century.

He is cited under the name of "Tosafot Riba," in the Temim De'im, in the printed tosafot (Sotah 17b), and in the Tosafot Yeshanin (Yoma 15a). They are frequently quoted without the name of their author. Isaac ben Asher also wrote a commentary on the Pentateuch, which is no longer extant. It is cited in the Minchat Yehudah, and Jacob Tam made use of it in his Sefer ha-Yashar (p. 282). He was also the teacher of Isaac ben Mordecai of Regensburg and Ephraim ben Isaac of Regensburg.
