= Ephraim ben Samson =

12th-century French tosafist

Ephraim ben Samson (Hebrew: אפרים בן שמשון) was a 12th-century French tosafist and biblical expounder.

Ephraim authored Perush al ha-Torah and was a follower of Eleazar of Worms.
