= Samuel ben Natronai =

12th-century German Tosafist

Rabbi Samuel ben Natronai (Hebrew: שמואל בן נטרונאי; c. 1105 – 1197), also known as RaSHBaT, was a 12th-century German Tosafist.

== Biography ==
Possibly born in Bari between 1100 and 1110, in his early years Rabbi Samuel learnt in Regensburg, Germany. He later lived in Bonn and Cologne, later settling in Mainz where he married the daughter of Eliezer ben Nathan. Many of his teachings, are found in "Sefer Raban" by his father in law and in "Sefer Ravyah" by his Eliezer b. Joel ha-Levi of Bonn, the son of his brother-in-law Joel ben Isaac ha-Levi. His rulings were highly regarded by his contemporaries. Samuel is known to have written commentaries on several Talmudic tractates, he also wrote a selihah for Yom Kipur that has survived. He died as a martyr in 1197 in Neuss.
