= Schlenker =

Schlenker is a surname. Notable people with the surname include:

- Chris Schlenker (born 1984), Canadian ice hockey referee
- Georg Schlenker German World War I fighter pilot
- Lisa Schlenker (born 1964), American rower
- Vincent Schlenker (born 1992), German hockey player
