= Seudat Chiyat HaMatim =

The Seudat Chiyat HaMatim, a Hebrew term, is a Seudah (feast) for the righteous following the Chiyat Hamatim, the bodily resurrection of the dead, which is referred to in a passage of the Talmud in the section on Passover which alludes to a relationship between the Passover Seder and this other feast of life and freedom. Rabbi Avira interpreted the biblical passage

And the child was weaned, and Abraham made a great feast on the day Isaac was weaned (Genesis 21:8)

as alluding to this feast.

According to Midrash, three mythical beasts mentioned in the Hebrew Bible, the bird Ziz, the animal Behemoth, and the sea-creature Leviathan will be served at the feast.

A belief in a bodily resurrection of the dead, one of Maimonides' Thirteen Principles of Faith, is a normative belief of Orthodox Judaism and a traditional belief of Conservative Judaism. However, Aggadic and Midrashic elements of the Talmud are often interpreted as representing allegorical symbolism within Orthodox Judaism (and generally so in more liberal branches).

== See also ==
- Seudat mitzvah
