= Ephraim ben Isaac of Regensburg =

German tosafist and liturgical poet (c. 1110–1175)

Personal life
- Born: Ephraim ben Isaac; 1110 Regensburg, Germany
- Died: 1175 (aged 64–65) Regensburg, Germany
- Parent: Rabbi Isaac ben Abraham (father)

Religious life
- Religion: Judaism

Ephraim ben Isaac ben Abraham of Regensburg (Hebrew: אפרים בן יצחק מרגנסבורג; c. 1110 – 1175) also sometimes called Ben Yakir, was a 12th-century German tosafist and liturgical poet who was known for his keen intellect, his numerous piyyutim and for controversy refusing to recognize any post-Talmudic authority.

== Biography ==
Born in about 1110 in Regensburg, Germany, in his early years, he studied under Isaac ben Mordecai and Isaac ben Asher ha-Levi, later moving to France to study under Rabbeinu Tam of whom he was an early student. On his return from France he settled in his birth-town of Regensburg, where, along with Isaac ben Mordecai and Moses ben Abraham, he established a rabbinical collegium. It was also during this time that he served as a respected member of the Regensburg bet din. Of apparent remarkable keenness of perception, Rabbi Ephraim refused to recognize, either in the theoretical or in the practical field, any post-Talmudic authority, and often, therefore, came into conflict with his teachers and colleagues. Once, after a particularly heated dispute with the rabbis of Speyer, Rabbenu Tam answered Rabbi Ephraim sharply stating: "From the day I have known you, I have never heard you concede a point" Rabbenu Tam, however, appreciating Ephraim's selfless motives, bore him no ill will, even referring to him affectionately as "my brother Rabbi Ephraim" Another time, Rabbi Ephraim tried to introduce extensive modifications to the strict Passover regulations, in spite of the protest of Rabbi Ephraim ben Joseph, whose authority he refused to recognize. However Rabbi Ephraim is probably best known for abrogating established customs and religious regulations which had been long regarded as inviolable, because he saw no reason for their existence to be found in the Talmud. Despite his controversial nature, his halakic literature was still greatly respected and still achieved great success. He is considered by some as the greatest writer of piyyutim of his time. Over thirty two of his piyyutim are extant, many of which reflect the hardships suffered by the Jews of Germany in the Regensburg massacre of 1137 and during the Second Crusade. He later moved on to Worms, and then back to Regensburg, where he died in 1175.

== Works ==
Ephraim wrote tosafot to various Talmudic treatises, some portions of which may be found in the printed tosafot as well as in other works. He wrote a commentary on Pirkei Avot and halakhic decisioning. He also apparently wrote "Arba Panim" a commentary on Seder Nezikin. Ephraim also employed the metric forms of Sephardi poetry and one of his seliḥot is in the Sephardi festival liturgy.

== See also ==
- History of the Jews in Regensburg
