= Ephraim of Bonn =

English medieval rabbi (Tosefist)

Ephraim of Bonn (1132–1200 or 1221?), also known as Ephraim ben Jacob, was a rabbi and writer, known for documenting the 1190 massacre of the Jews in the English city of York.

== Biography ==
Ephraim belonged to a prominent family of scholars, which included Eliezer ben Nathan, to whom he addressed questions, and Leontin ben Jacob. He had two brothers, Hillel and Kalonymus, both of whom he outlived. As a boy of thirteen he witnessed the bloody persecutions to which the Jews on the Rhine were subjected, and, with many other Jews, found refuge from the fury of the mob in the castle of Wolkenburg, near Königswinter, in the archbishopric of Cologne. Later he lived at Neuss, and left there for Cologne only a few days before the massacre of 1187. He lost, however, on this occasion, a large part of his fortune. He seems to have resided usually at Worms. He later studied in Bonn under Joel ben Isaac ha-Levi.

== Works ==
=== Halacha ===
Ephraim was one of the important German Talmudists of his time, although comparatively little is known of his work in the field of halakhah. He frequently wrote responsa in conjunction with Judah ben Kalonymus, Moses ben Mordechai, and Baruch ben Samuel; several of them are quoted in the Mordechai; but the "Ḥibbur" mentioned in the Mordechai is not by him, but by Ephraim ben Nathan.

=== Liturgy ===
Ephraim is better known as a liturgical poet. Zunz enumerates twenty-three of his piyyutim, several of which are found in German and Polish liturgies. For instance, his "Elohim tzivita li-yedidcha bechiracha" and "HaRachaman Hu Asher Hanan" are still recited in Germany on the occasion of a circumcision. Ephraim was, perhaps, the last German rabbi to compose poems in Aramaic for the synagogue, his selihah "Ta Shema" being especially well known. This piyyut is a mosaic containing forty-five lines, a combination of Aramaic expressions and phrases used in the Talmud. His Hebrew piyyutim are frequently acrostic compositions with a Talmudic phraseology, and are therefore in many cases obscure and ungraceful. He had wit and a great command of both Hebrew and Aramaic. In almost all his poems he alludes to the persecutions and to the martyrs of Judaism. He also wrote a commentary on the earlier portions of the Machzor, which became the chief source for the similar work of a compiler at the beginning of the fourteenth century, and which is extant in manuscript in Hamburg.

=== History ===
Ephraim's account of the persecutions of the Jews in Germany, France, and England, between 1146 and 1196, is of great historical value. It is in a great measure the record of his own experiences, which are related impartially, and is among the most valuable of the documents used by medieval chronographers in their history of the persecutions during the period of the Crusades. It was printed for the first time as an appendix to Wiener's German translation of Joseph ha-Kohen's "Emeḳ ha-Bacha" (Leipzig, 1858), and translated into German by S. Baer in "Hebräische Berichte über die Judenverfolgungen Während der Kreuzzüge," (Berlin, 1892). Scattered notices by contemporaneous Christian writers testify to the accuracy of Ephraim's descriptions.
