= Isaac ben Mordecai of Regensburg =

12th century German Tosafist

Rabbi Isaac ben Mordecai of Regensburg
- יצחק בן מרדכי מרגנסבורג
- Title: RiBaM

Personal life
- Born: Prague, Bohemia

Religious life
- Religion: Judaism

Rabbi Isaac ben Mordecai of Regensburg (Hebrew: יצחק בן מרדכי מרגנסבורג) also known by his acronym Ribam (Rabbi Isaac Ben Mordecai) was a 12th century Bohemian-German Tosafist.

== Biography ==
Rabbi Isaac was born in Prague, Bohemia in the 12th century. In his early years, he studied in Regensburg under Rabbeinu Tam and Isaac ben Asher ha-Levi.

In the following years, Rabbi Isaac served as the head of the city's bet din. He was considered the most preeminent rabbi of the city. He compiled tosafot to most tractates of the Talmud. A large number of his tosafot are on the tractate Bava Batra, which are included in the first printed edition of the Talmud. He also known to have written tosafot on tractates Pesaḥim, Mo'ed Katan, Bava Kamma, Shabbat, Ketubbot, Gittin, Sotah, Nazir, and Bava Meẓia. In his later life, Rabbi Isaac became embroiled in a controversy with Eliezer ben Nathan of Mainz, who criticized several of Rabbi Isaac's statements and in his reply, Rabbi Isaac is said to have treated him with great respect. Among his pupils were Ephraim ben Isaac of Regensburg.

Due to similar appellation, he and rabbi Isaac ben Meir are sometimes confused.

== Notable Views ==
Rabbi Isaac was said to fast on Rosh Hashanah, to ensure a large appetite for the evening meal.
