= List of Jewish immigrants to the Land of Israel =

Jews have immigrated to the land of Israel for centuries. This list focuses on migrations preceding modern Zionism.

== 1st century ==
- Hillel the Elder – Jewish sage (c. 110 BCE – 10 CE)

== 2nd century ==
- Hanan the Egyptian – 2nd century rabbi
- Nathan the Babylonian – 2nd-century Judean rabbi

== 3rd century ==
- Hiyya the Great – Rabbi and author of the Tosefta (c.180–c.230)
- Zeira – Rabbi and Amora
- Eleazar ben Pedat – 3rd-century Jewish scholar from Babylon
- Issi ben Judah – 2nd and 3rd-century Middle Eastern rabbi
- Hiyya bar Joseph – 3rd-century Babylonian rabbi
- Hiyya bar Abba – 3rd century Jewish amoraic sage
- Hoshaiah II – Rabbi (died ca. 350)
- Hanina – Second and third generation amora

== 4th century ==
- Jeremiah (III) – Jewish Amora sage of the Land of Israel
- Samuel bar Isaac – Rabbi from the third generation of amoraim
- Rabbi Assi – Jewish Talmudist and rabbi

== 6th Century ==
- Mar-Zutra III

== 8th century ==
- Ahai of Shabha – 8th-century Jewish scholar

== 9th century ==
- Daniel al-Qumisi – Karaite rabbi (died 946)
- Mourners of Zion (Karaite Movement) – Karaite immigrants to Jerusalem

== 10th century ==
- Babylonian Migration c. 943

== 11th century ==
- Maghreb Migration (mid-11th century)

== 12th century ==
- Judah Halevi – Iberian philosopher and poet (c.1075–1141)
- Maimonides – Medieval Jewish philosopher (1135/1138–1204) (moved to Egypt afterwards)
- Maimon ben Joseph – 12th-century Spanish rabbinic judge

== 13th century ==
- Aliyah of the Tosafists – 13th-century migration of Jewish scholars
- Samuel ben Samson – 13th-century Jewish rabbi who visited the Land of Israel
- Jonathan ben David ha-Cohen – 12th-century French commentator on the Talmud
- Tobiah ben Simson
- Nachmanides – 13th century Sephardic rabbi and scholar
- Samson ben Abraham of Sens – French Jewish rabbi (c. 1150 – c. 1230)
- Yechiel of Paris – Jewish scholar of the 13th century
- Meir of Rothenburg – German rabbi and poet (c.1215–1293) (attempted 1286, captured en route)
- Shem Tov ben Abraham ibn Gaon – Spanish Talmudist and kabbalist
- Joseph ben Baruch – French rabbi
- Moses Taku – Rabbi, 13th-century Tosafist from Bohemia

== 14th century ==
- Ishtori Haparchi – 14th century Jewish physician, topographer, and traveler
- Isaac Asir HaTikvah – 14th-century Ashkenazi Rabbinic leader

== 15th century ==
- Obadiah of Bertinoro – Italian rabbi
- Elijah of Ferrara – 15th-century Talmudist and traveller
- David ben Solomon ibn Abi Zimra – Spanish-born rabbi (1479–1573)
- Joseph Saragossi – Spanish-born rabbi and kabbalist (1460–1507)
- Joseph da Montagna - Ashkenazi rabbi from Italy, appointed dayyan in Jerusalem at the end of 1481

== 16th century ==
- Joseph Karo – Spanish rabbi and author on Jewish law (1488–1575)
- Solomon Alkabetz – Sephardic Jewish poet, kabbalist and rabbi (1505–1584)
- Jacob Berab – Sephardic rabbi and talmudist (1474–1546)
- Isaac Luria – Rabbi and Kabbalist (c.1534–1572) (born in Jerusalem, raised in Cairo, moved to Safed)
- Moses ben Joseph di Trani – Ottoman rabbi (1500–1580)
- Abraham ben Eliezer Halevi – Sephardic rabbi and kabbalist (born c. 1460)
- Levi ibn Habib – Ottoman Chief Rabbi of Jerusalem (c. 1480 – c. 1545)
- Isaac Sholal ha-Kohen – last Nagid of Egypt, emigrated in 1517
- Issachar ben Mordecai ibn Susan – 16th-century Jewish mathematician
- Ephraim ben Judah
- Malkiel Ashkenazi – 16th-century Sephardic rabbi and leader
- Moses ben Mordecai Bassola – Rabbi and traveler
- Menahem Lonzano
- Samuel ben Isaac Aripul
- Moshe Alshich
- Moshe ben Mordechai Galante – 16th-century rabbi and disciple of Joseph Caro
- Abraham ben Mordecai Galante
- Solomon Adeni – Yemenite Jewish author and Talmudist (1567–1625)

== 17th century ==
- Hayyim ben Abraham ha-Kohen – Jewish rabbi and writer (1585–1655)
- Isaiah Horowitz – Ashkenazi rabbi & mystic (c.1555–1630)
- Abraham Azulai – Kabbalistic author and commentator (1570–1643)
- Israel ben Moses Najara – Jewish poet, preacher, biblical commentator, and rabbi (c. 1555–c. 1625)
- Gedaliah Hayyon

== 18th century ==
- Judah HeHasid – 17th-century Jewish preacher
- Abraham Gershon of Kitov – 18th-century Hasidic rabbi
- Menachem Mendel of Vitebsk – Early leader of Hasidic Judaism
- Gedaliah of Siemiatycze
- Abraham Kalisker – Hasidic rabbi (1741–1810)
- Haim Farhi – Ottoman Jewish military adviser (1760–1820)
- Abraham ben Samuel Cohen of Lask – 18th-century Jewish activist
- Chaim ibn Attar – Moroccan rabbi (c. 1696–1743)
- Hayyim ben Jacob Abulafia – Israeli rabbinical authority
- Moshe Chaim Luzzatto – Italian rabbi and kabbalist (1707–1746)
- Nachman of Horodenka – Hasidic rabbi (approximately 1680-1765)
- Menachem Mendel of Peremyshlany – Hasidic Jewish leader (b. 1728)
- Yom Tov Algazi – 18th century Ottoman rabbi
- Shalom Sharabi – Orthodox rabbi and kabbalist
- Elazar Rokeach of Amsterdam

== 19th century ==
- Perushim – Disciples of the Vilna Gaon
- Abraham-Leib ben Yitshak Monsohn – Prominent Jewish family of Jerusalem
- Natan Friedland – Proto-Zionist rabbi
- Yisroel ben Shmuel of Shklov – Lithuanian rabbi (1770–1839)
- Menahem Mendel of Shklov
- Moses David Ashkenazi
- Aharon Chelouche – Algerian Jew, among Tel Aviv founders (died 1920)
- Yisrael Bak – Jewish publisher (1797–1874)
- Yehuda Bibas – Sephardic rabbi (1789–1852)
- Maiden of Ludmir – Female rebbe (1805–1888)
- Naftali Hertz Halevi – Polish-Israeli rabbi (1852–1902)
- Judah Alkalai – Bosnian rabbi (1798–1878)
- Hillel Rivlin – Lithuanian rabbi (1757–1838)
- Meir Auerbach – Polish-Israeli rabbi (1815–1878)
- Shmuel Salant – Polish-Israeli rabbi (1816–1909)
- Abraham Moses Luncz – Russian scholar and editor
- Zundel Salant – Ashkenazi rabbi and teacher
- Jacob Saphir – Hebrew researcher, ethnographer, and emissary (1822–1886)
- Shlomo Zalman Zoref – Rabbi (1785–1851)
- Bilu (movement) – Jewish movement
- First Aliyah – Jewish immigration to Palestine (1881–1903)
