= Aliyah =

Immigration of diaspora Jews to the Land of Israel

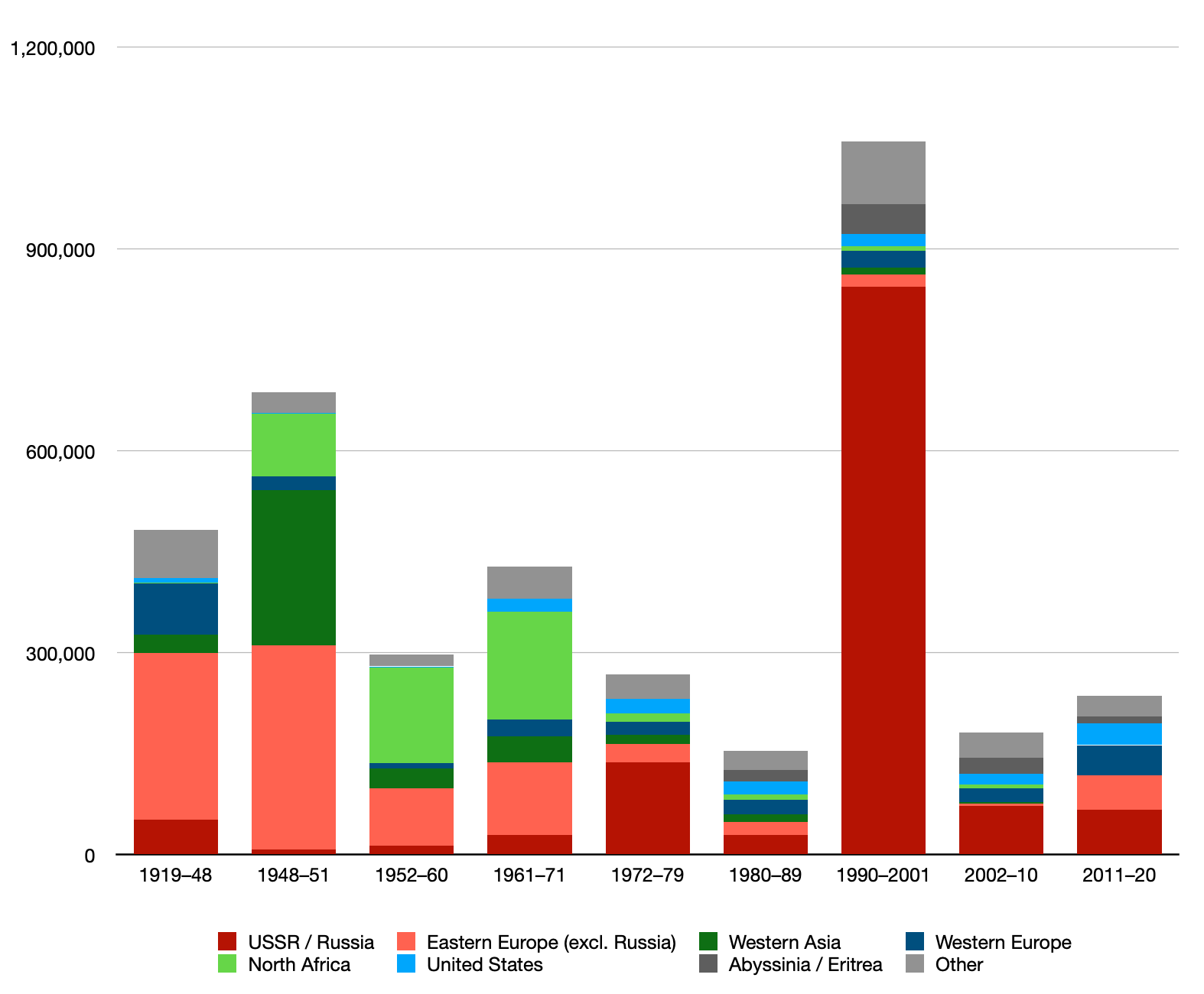
100 years of Aliyah (immigration) to Mandatory Palestine and Israel, between 1919 and 2020

Aliyah (US: /ˌæliˈɑː/, UK: /ˌɑː-/; Hebrew: עֲלִיָּה, romanized: ălīyyā, lit. 'ascent') is the immigration of Jews from the diaspora to, historically, the geographical Land of Israel or the Palestine region, where (in the 20th century) the State of Israel was established. Traditionally described as "the act of going up" (namely, toward the Jewish holy city of Jerusalem), moving to the Land of Israel or "making aliyah" is one of the most basic tenets of Zionism. The opposite action—emigration by Jews from the Land of Israel—is referred to in the Hebrew language as yerida (lit. 'descent'). The Law of Return that was passed by the Israeli parliament in 1950 gives all diaspora Jews, as well as their children and grandchildren, the right to relocate to Israel and acquire Israeli citizenship on the basis of connecting to their Jewish identity.

For much of their history, most Jews have lived in diasporas outside of the Land of Israel. Dispersion has resulted both from voluntary emigration (e.g. to seek employment or improved conditions of life) and from various historical conflicts that have been associated with Jewish persecution, expulsions and exoduses. In the late 19th century, 99.7% of the world's Jews lived outside the region, with Jews representing 2–5% of the population of the Palestine region. Despite its historical value as a national aspiration for the Jewish people, aliyah was rarely undertaken prior to the "national awakening" and the development of the Zionist movement in the late 19th century. Larger-scale immigration of Jews to Palestine had consequently begun by 1882. Institutionalized antisemitism and the rise of the Nazi rule in parts of Europe contributed to significant Jewish immigration waves from Europe during the 1930s and 1940s. Mandatory Palestine became a major destination for Jewish immigrants where Palestine absorbed 247,000 newcomers between 1932 and 1939, representing approximately 46% of Jewish emigration from Europe during that period. The 1939 White Paper set a restriction on Jewish immigration to 75,000 over the following five years, with Arab consent for further immigration afterwards. These restrictions contributed to increased illegal immigration (Aliyah Bet) during the British Mandate period. The largest surge in modern Jewish migration to the region occurred between 1948 and 1951, when more than 680,000 immigrants arrived. This period following the Israeli Declaration of Independence in 1948 saw the Jewish population more than double within a few years. Since 1950, millions of Jews have immigrated to Israel under the Law of Return. As of 2014, Israel and the Israeli-occupied territories contain approximately 42.9 percent of the world's Jewish population.

Since 2024, the State of Israel has seen net negative migration: yerida is higher than aliyah.

== Terminology ==
The Hebrew word aliyah means "ascent" or "going up". Jewish tradition views traveling to the Land of Israel as an ascent, both geographically and metaphysically. In one opinion, the geographical sense preceded the metaphorical one, as most Jews going on pilgrimage to Jerusalem, which is situated at approximately 750 meters (2,500 feet) above sea level, had to climb to a higher geographic elevation. The reason is that many Jews in early rabbinic times used to live either in Egypt's Nile Delta and on the plains of Babylonia, which lay relatively low; or somewhere in the Mediterranean Basin, from where they arrived by ship.

It is noteworthy that various references in the earlier books of the Bible indicate that Egypt was considered as being "below" other countries, so that going to Egypt was described as "going down to Egypt" while going away from Egypt (including Hebrews going out of Egypt to Canaan) was "going up out of Egypt". Thus, in the Book of Genesis 46 God speaks to Jacob and says “Do not be afraid to go down to Egypt, for I will make you into a great nation there. I will go down to Egypt with you." And in the Book of Exodus 1, the oppressive new King of Egypt suspects the Hebrews of living in Egypt of being enemies who in time of war might "Fight against us, and so get them up out of the land".

Widespread use of the term Aliyah to describe ideologically inspired Jewish immigration to Palestine / Israel is due to Arthur Ruppin's 1930 work Soziologie der Juden. Aliyah has also been defined, by sociologists such as Aryeh Tartakower, as immigration for the good of the community, regardless of the destination.

Aliyah is an important Jewish cultural concept and a fundamental component of Zionism. It is enshrined in Israel's Law of Return, which accords any Jew (deemed as such by halakha and/or Israeli secular law) and eligible non-Jews (a child and a grandchild of a Jew, the spouse of a Jew, the spouse of a child of a Jew and the spouse of a grandchild of a Jew), the legal right to assisted immigration and settlement in Israel, as well as Israeli citizenship. Someone who "makes aliyah" is called an oleh (m.; pl. olim) or olah (f.; pl. olot). Many religious Jews espouse aliyah as a return to the Promised Land, and regard it as the fulfillment of God's biblical promise to the descendants of the Hebrew patriarchs Abraham, Isaac, and Jacob. Nachmanides (the Ramban) includes making aliyah in his enumeration of the 613 commandments.

Sifre says that the mitzvah (commandment) of living in Eretz Yisrael is as important as all the other mitzvot put together. There are many mitzvot such as shmita, the sabbatical year for farming, which can only be performed in Israel.

For generations of religious Jews, aliyah was associated with the coming of the Jewish Messiah. Jews prayed for their Messiah to come, who was to redeem the "Land of Israel" (Eretz Yisrael, commonly known in English as the region of Palestine) from gentile rule and return world Jewry to the land under a Halachic theocracy.

In Zionist discourse, the term aliyah (plural aliyot) includes both voluntary immigration for ideological, emotional, or practical reasons and, on the other hand, mass flight of persecuted populations of Jews. The vast majority of Israeli Jews today trace their family's recent roots to outside the country. While many have actively chosen to settle in Israel rather than some other country, many had little or no choice about leaving their previous home countries. While Israel is commonly recognized as "a country of immigrants", it is also, in large measure, a country of refugees, including internal refugees.

== Pre-modern aliyah ==
=== Biblical ===
The Hebrew Bible relates that the patriarch Abraham came to the Land of Canaan with his family and followers in approximately 1800 BC. His grandson Jacob went down to Egypt with his family, and after several centuries there, the Israelites went back to Canaan under Moses and Joshua, entering it in about 1300 BC.

=== Antiquity ===
In Zionist historiography, post the Balfour Declaration and the start of the "Third Aliyah", the "First Aliyah" and "Second Aliyah" originally referred to the two Biblical "returns to Zion" described in Ezra–Nehemiah – the "First Aliya" led by Zerubbabel, and the "Second Aliya" led by Ezra and Nehemiah approximately 80 years later. A few decades after the fall of the Kingdom of Judah and the Babylonian exile of the Jewish people, approximately 50,000 Jews returned to Zion following the Edict of Cyrus from 538 BC. The Jewish priestly scribe Ezra led the Jewish exiles living in Babylon to their home city of Jerusalem in 459 BC. Even those Jews who did not end up returning gave their children names like Yashuv-Tzadik and Yaeliyahu which testified to their desire to return.

Jews returned to the Land of Israel throughout the Second Temple period. Herod the Great also encouraged aliyah and often gave key posts, such as the position of High Priest, to returnees.

In late antiquity, the two hubs of rabbinic learning were Babylonia and the Land of Israel. Throughout the Amoraic period, many Babylonian Jews immigrated to the Land of Israel and left their mark on life there, as rabbis and leaders.

=== Middle Ages ===
In the 10th century, leaders of the Karaite Jewish community, mostly living under Persian rule, urged their followers to settle in Eretz Yisrael. Known as the Mourners of Zion, these Karaites established their own quarter in Jerusalem, on the western slope of the Kidron Valley. During this period, there is abundant evidence of pilgrimages to Jerusalem by Jews from various countries, mainly in the month of Tishrei, around the time of the Sukkot holiday.

The number of Jews migrating to the land of Israel rose significantly between the 13th and 19th centuries, mainly due to a general decline in the status of Jews across Europe and an increase in religious persecution. The expulsion of Jews from England (1290), France (1391), Austria (1421), and Spain (the Alhambra decree of 1492) were seen by many as a sign of approaching redemption and contributed greatly to the messianic spirit of the time.

Aliyah was also spurred during this period by the resurgence of messianic fervor among the Jews of France, Italy, the German states, Poland, Russia, and North Africa. The belief in the imminent coming of the Jewish Messiah, the ingathering of the exiles and the re-establishment of the kingdom of Israel encouraged many who had few other options to make the perilous journey to the land of Israel.

Pre-Zionist resettlement in Palestine met with various degrees of success. In 1211, the "aliyah of the three hundred rabbis" saw notable French and German Tosafists such as Samson of Coucy, Joseph ben Baruch, Baruch ben Isaac and Samson ben Abraham of Sens, along with their colleagues and students, immigrate to Palestine, as recorded in the Shebet Yehudah. There is doubt about the accuracy of the account, as there is no evidence that there were actually 300 immigrants, and that number is likely exaggerated. It also mentions Jonathan ben David ha-Cohen immigrating there, but he died in 1205, and was said to have celebrated Purim in Palestine in 1210. Little is known of the fate of their descendants. It is thought that few survived the bloody upheavals caused by the Crusader invasion in 1229 and their subsequent expulsion by the Muslims in 1291. After the fall of the Byzantine Empire in 1453 and the expulsion of Jews from Spain (1492) and Portugal (1498), many Jews made their way to the Holy Land.

Samson b. Abraham of Sens, who emigrated in 1211, wrote in his responsa that the biblical commandment to go to Eretz Yisrael was nullified due to pikuach nefesh, or saving a life, citing the danger of the journey, particularly for pregnant women. Haim ben Hananel HaCohen ruled that the commandment was negated altogether. Moses ben Joseph di Trani, born in Salonika in 1490, made aliyah and became the rabbi of Safed, where he died in 1580. In his writings, Trani disagreed with Haim Cohen, and argued that it was not dangerous to travel to Palestine due to the peace between "Edom" (Christian Europe) and "Ishmael" (Islamic/Arab world) at the time. David ibn Zimri, known as the Radbaz, also went to Palestine where he died in 1574. The Radbaz reconciled Maimonides' brief journey to Jerusalem in 1165, but ultimate settlement in Egypt, despite Maimonides' belief that it was commanded to settle in Eretz Yisrael and forbidden to remain in Egypt, that he had been compelled to remain by the authorities, as physician to the sultan. Ishtori Haparchi, who was a geographer of Palestine, said that Maimonides signed letters as "the writer who transgresses three negative commandments every day," though no surviving responsa with Maimonides' autograph are found bearing this.

Notable rabbi Nahmanides went to Jerusalem a few years before his death in 1267. Isaiah Horowitz made aliyah in 1621. Nahmanides, in his gloss on Maimonides' Book of Commandments, articulated that contrary to Rashi's interpretation, settling Eretz Yisrael was a divine commandment and not simply a promise, arguing that the Torah commanded the people of Israel to conquer and possess the Holy Land. Though he spent most of his life in Gerona, he went to Palestine without his wife and children and died in 1270. It not known why his family did not join him.

In 1541, following their expulsion from Naples, some Jews immigrated to Palestine. In the 1560s, Gracia Mendes and Joseph Nasi obtained a concession from the sultan to permit Jews to settle in Safed and Tiberias.

Some Ukrainian Jewish refugees fleeing the pogroms of the Khmelnytsky Uprising of the mid-17th century also settled in the Holy Land. Then the immigration in the 18th and early 19th centuries of thousands of followers of various Kabbalist and Hassidic rabbis, as well as the disciples of the Vilna Gaon and the disciples of the Chattam Sofer, added considerably to the Jewish populations in Jerusalem, Tiberias, Hebron, and Safed.

=== 18th century ===
The 1700 immigration associated with messianic Sabbateanism is considered the first modern mass movement of Jewish immigrants to Israel. Also in 1700, Judah HeHasid and his followers settled in Jerusalem, and Hayyim ben Jacob Abulafia and his followers in Tiberias. HeHasid's Hurva Synagogue (or "ruined synagogue"), rebuilt on the ruins of a 15th-century synagogue, was again destroyed in 1720.

A notable emigration of about 300 Hasidic immigrants led by Menachem Mendel of Vitebsk and Abraham Kalisker in 1777 aimed to establish a religious center. They were preceded by Nachman of Horodenka, Abraham Gershon of Kitov and Menachem Mendel of Peremyshlany in 1764, members of the circle of the Baal Shem Tov.

=== 19th century ===
The messianic dreams of the Gaon of Vilna inspired one of the largest pre-Zionist waves of immigration to Eretz Yisrael. In 1808 hundreds of the Gaon's disciples, known as Perushim, settled in Tiberias and Safed, and later formed the core of the Old Yishuv in Jerusalem. This was part of a larger movement of thousands of Jews from countries as widely spaced as Persia and Morocco, Yemen and Russia, who moved to Palestine beginning in the first decade of the nineteenth century – and in even larger numbers after the conquest of the region by Muhammad Ali of Egypt in 1832 – all drawn by the expectation of the arrival of the Messiah in the Jewish year 5600, Christian year 1840, a movement documented in Arie Morgenstern's Hastening Redemption. There were also those who like the British mystic Laurence Oliphant tried to lease Northern Palestine to settle the Jews there (1879).

Jewish immigration to Palestine began in earnest following the 1839 Tanzimat reforms; between 1840 and 1880, the Jewish population of Palestine rose from 9,000 to 23,000. (Note: Between 1880 and 1907, the number of Jews in Palestine grew from 23,000 to 80,000. Most of the community resided in Jerusalem, which already had a Jewish majority at the beginning of the influx. (Footnote: Mordecai Elia, Ahavar Tziyon ve-Kolel Hod (Tel Aviv, 1971), appendix A. Between 1840 and 1880 the Jewish settlement in Palestine grew in numbers from 9,000 to 23,000.) The First Aliyah accounted for only a few thousand of the new-comers, and the number of the Biluim among them was no more than a few dozen. Jewish immigration to Palestine had begun to swell in the 1840s, following the liberalization of Ottoman domestic policy (the Tanzimat Reforms) and as a result of the protection extended to immigrants by the European consulates set up at the time in Jerusalem and Jaffa. The majority of immigrants came from Eastern and Central Europe – the Russian Empire, Romania, and Hungary – and were not inspired by modern Zionist ideology. Many were motivated by a blend of traditional ideology (e.g., belief in the sanctity of the land of Israel and in the redemption of the Jewish people through the return to Zion) and practical considerations (e.g., desire to escape the worsening conditions in their lands of origin and to improve their lot in Palestine). The proto-Zionist ideas which had already crystallized in Western Europe during the late 1850s and early 1860s were gaining currency in Eastern Europe.)

== Zionist aliyah (19th century) ==
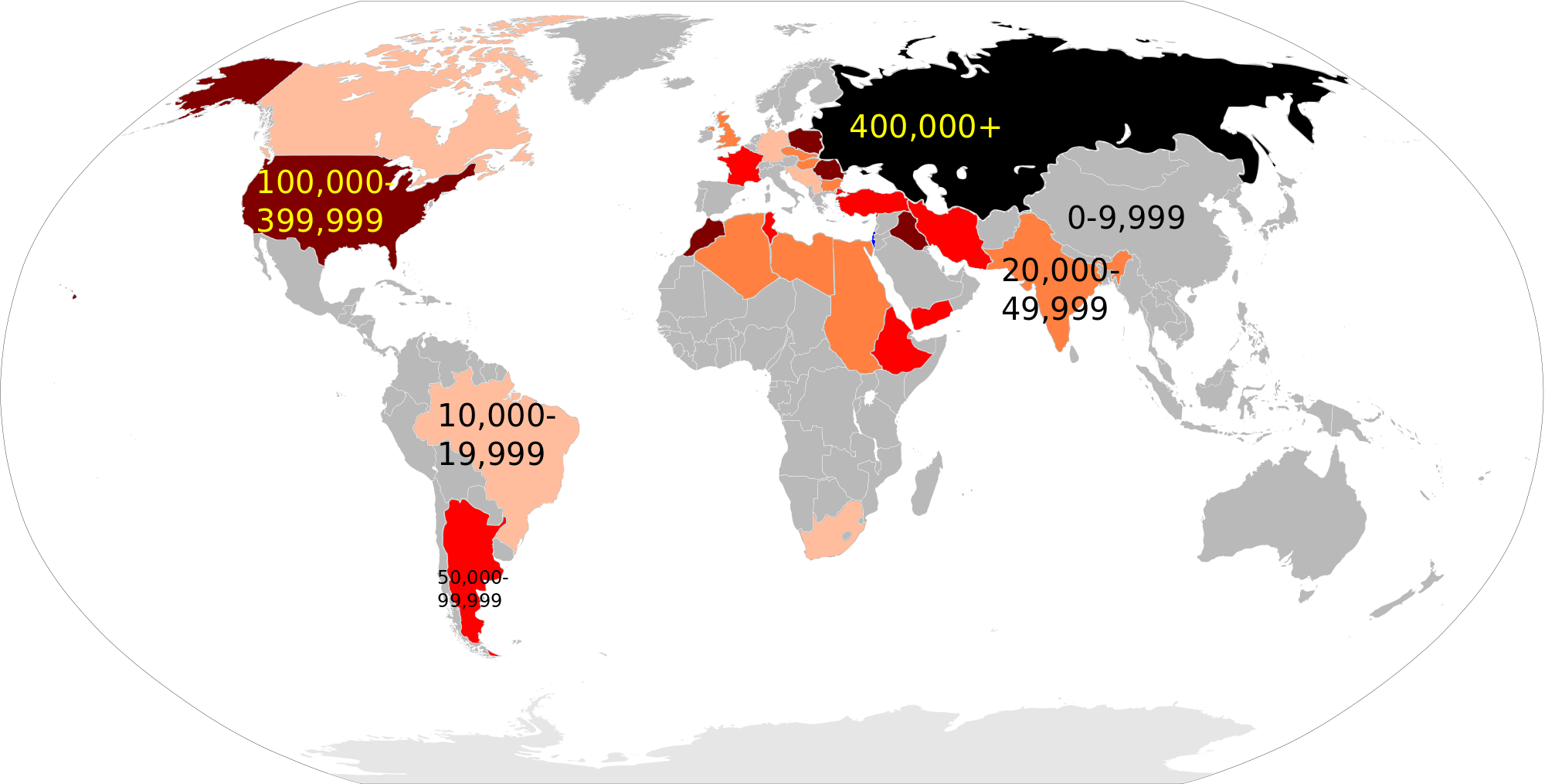
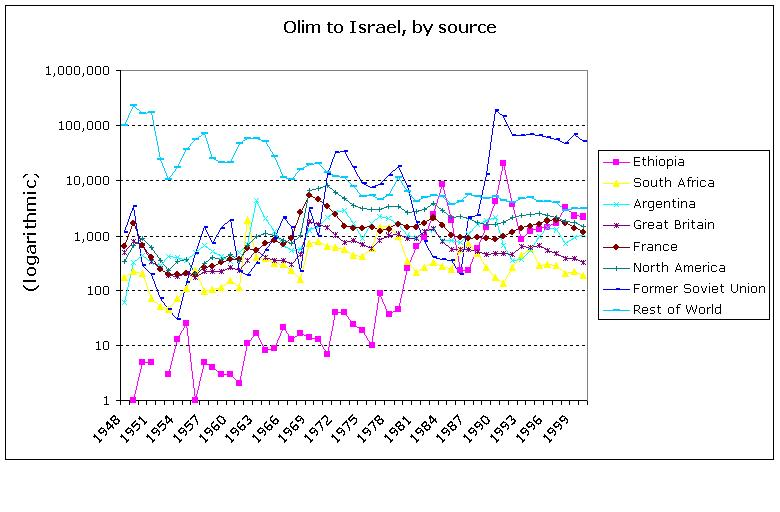
Aliyah by numbers per year (1948-2007)

In Zionist history, the different waves of aliyah, beginning with the arrival of the Biluim from Russia in 1882, are categorized by date and the country of origin of the immigrants. In 1872 colonies were established at Petah Tikva and Rosh Pinna. Mikveh Israel agricultural school was established in 1870. Jewish settlement in Jaffa may be dated to 1820, when Isaiah Ajiman, a merchant hailing from one of several prominent Istanbul Jewish families, moved there from said capital. In the aftermath of the 1826 Auspicious Incident, he and two other leading figures of the Istanbul Jewish community were executed, marking a decline in the status of Ottoman Jews.

In the late 19th century, 99.7% of the world's Jews lived outside the region, with Jews representing 2–5% of the population of the Palestine region.

Pre-19th century small-scale return migration of Diaspora Jews to the Land of Israel is characterized as the Pre-Modern Aliyah. Since the birth of Zionism in the late 19th century, the advocates of aliyah have striven to facilitate the settlement of Jewish refugees in Ottoman Palestine, Mandatory Palestine, and the sovereign State of Israel.

The periodization of historical waves of Aliyah was first published after the 1917 Balfour Declaration, which created expectations of the start of a huge wave of immigration dubbed the "Third Aliyah", in contrast to the Biblical "First Aliyah" and "Second Aliyah" "returns to Zion" described in Ezra–Nehemiah. Over the next two years, discussion in Zionist literature transformed the two prior to refer to the contemporary immigration waves at the end of the 19th century and the early 20th. These periods as per the modern convention were first published in October 1919 by Yosef Haim Brenner.

In the 1930s and 1940s, Zionist historians began to divide the next periods of immigration to Palestine into different phases, in a form which "created and presumed the unique traits of aliyah and the Zionist enterprise". The currently accepted five-wave periodization was first published in Hebrew by sociologist David Gurevich in his 1944 work The Jewish Population of Palestine: Immigration, Demographic Structure and Natural Growth: the First Aliyah and the Second Aliyah to Ottoman Palestine, followed by the Third, Fourth, and Fifth Aliyah to Mandatory Palestine. Following Ruppin and Jacob Lestschinsky before him, Gurevich's use of the term Aliyah emphasized the ideological element of the immigration, despite the fact that such a motivation was not representative of the immigrants as a whole.

Subsequently, named periods include Aliyah Bet (immigration done in spite of restrictive Mandatory law) between 1934 and 1948 and the Bricha of the Holocaust survivors; the aliyah from elsewhere in the Middle East and North Africa as well as the aliyah from Western and Communist countries following the Six-Day War with the 1968 Polish political crisis, as well as the aliyah from post-Soviet states in the 1990s. Today, most aliyah consists of voluntary migration for ideological, economic, or family reunification purposes. Because Jewish lineage can provide a right to Israeli citizenship, aliyah (returning to Israel) has both a secular and a religious significance.

The first modern period of immigration to receive a number in common speech was the Third Aliyah, which in the World War I period was referred to as the successor to the First and Second Aliyot from Babylonia in the Biblical period. Reference to earlier modern periods as the First and Second Aliyot appeared first in 1919 and took a while to catch on.

=== Ottoman Palestine (1881–1914) ===
The pronounced persecution of Russian Jews between 1881 and 1910 led to a large wave of emigration. Since only a small portion of East European Jews had adopted Zionism by then, between 1881 and 1914 only 30–40,000 emigrants went to Ottoman Palestine, while over one and a half million Russian Jews and 300,000 from Austria-Hungary reached Northern America.

==== First Aliyah (1882–1903) ====
Between 1882 and 1903, approximately 35,000 Jews immigrated to the Ottoman Palestine, joining the pre-existing Jewish population which in 1880 numbered 20,000-25,000. The Jews immigrating arrived in groups that had been assembled, or recruited. Most of these groups had been arranged in the areas of Romania and Russia in the 1880s. The migration of Jews from Russia correlates with the end of the Russian pogroms, with about 3 percent of Jews emigrating from Europe to Palestine. The groups who arrived in Palestine around this time were called Hibbat Tsiyon, which is a Hebrew word meaning "fondness for Zion." They were also called Hovevei Tsiyon or "enthusiasts for Zion" by the members of the groups themselves. While these groups expressed interest and "fondness" for Palestine, they were not strong enough in number to encompass an entire mass movement as would appear later on in other waves of migration. The majority, belonging to the Hovevei Zion and Bilu movements, came from the Russian Empire with a smaller number arriving from Yemen. Many established agricultural communities. Among the towns that these individuals established are Petah Tikva (already in 1878), Rishon LeZion, Rosh Pinna, and Zikhron Ya'akov. In 1882 the Yemenite Jews settled in the Arab village of Silwan located south-east of the walls of the Old City of Jerusalem on the slopes of the Mount of Olives. Kurdish Jews settled in Jerusalem starting around 1895.

==== Second Aliyah (1904–1914) ====
Between 1904 and 1914, 35,000–40,000 Jews immigrated to Ottoman Palestine. The vast majority came from the Russian Empire, in particular from the Pale of Settlement in Eastern Europe. Jews from other countries in Eastern Europe such as Romania and Bulgaria also joined. Jewish emigration from Eastern Europe was largely due to pogroms and outbreaks of antisemitism there. However, Mountain Jews from the Caucasus and Jews from other countries including Yemen, Iran, and Argentina also arrived at this time. The Eastern European Jewish immigrants of this period, greatly influenced by socialist ideals, established the first kibbutz, Degania Alef, in 1909 and formed self-defense organizations, such as Hashomer, to counter increasing Arab hostility and to help Jews to protect their communities from Arab marauders. Ahuzat Bayit, a new suburb of Jaffa established in 1909, eventually grew to become the city of Tel Aviv. During this period, some of the underpinnings of an independent nation-state arose: Hebrew, the ancient national language, was revived as a spoken language; newspapers and literature written in Hebrew were published; political parties and workers organizations were established. The First World War effectively ended the period of the Second Aliyah. It is estimated that over half of those who arrived during this period ended up leaving; Ben Gurion stated that nine out of ten left.

=== British Palestine (1919–1948) ===
==== Third Aliyah (1919–1923) ====
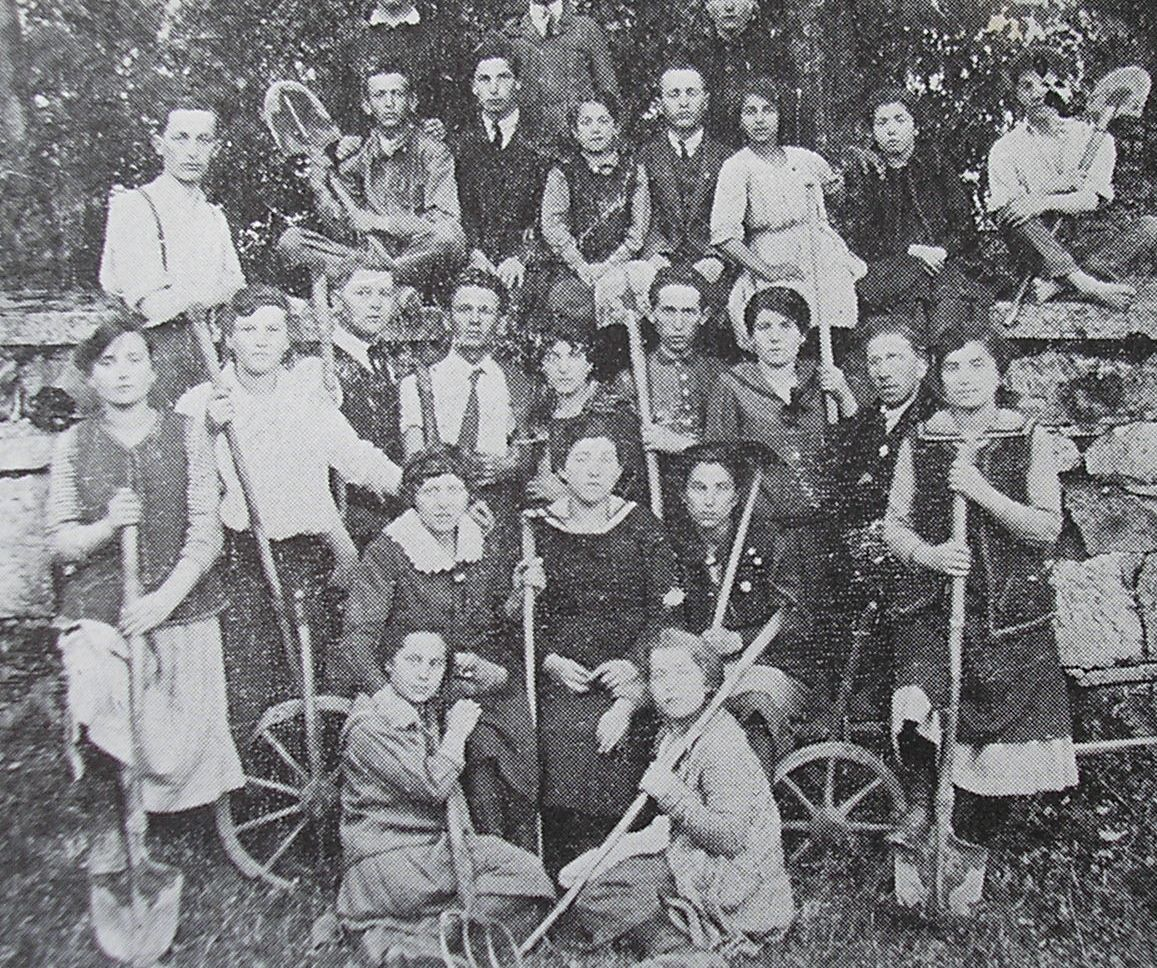
Abba Hushi during his Hachshara, circa 1920

Between 1919 and 1923, 40,000 Jews, mainly from Eastern Europe, arrived in the wake of World War I. The British occupation of Palestine and the establishment of the British Mandate created the conditions for the implementation of the promises contained in the Balfour Declaration. Many of the Jewish immigrants were ideologically driven pioneers, known as halutzim, trained in agriculture and capable of establishing self-sustaining economies. In spite of immigration quotas established by the British administration, the Jewish population reached 90,000 by the end of this period. The Jezreel Valley and the Hefer Plain marshes were drained and converted to agricultural use. Additional national institutions arose such as the Histadrut (General Labor Federation); an elected assembly; national council; and the Haganah, a Zionist paramilitary organization.

==== Fourth Aliyah (1924–1929) ====
Between 1924 and 1929, 82,000 Jews arrived, many as a result of increasing anti-Semitism in Poland and throughout Europe. The vast majority of Jewish immigrants arrived from Europe mostly from Poland, the Soviet Union, Romania, and Lithuania, but about 12% came from Asia, mostly Yemen and Iraq. The immigration quotas of the United States kept Jews out. This group contained many middle-class families that moved to the growing towns, establishing small businesses, and light industry. Of these approximately 23,000 left the country.

==== Fifth Aliyah (1929–1939) ====
Between 1929 and 1939, with the rise of Nazism in Germany, a new wave of 250,000 immigrants arrived; the majority of these, 174,000, arrived between 1933 and 1936, after which increasing restrictions on immigration by the British made immigration clandestine and illegal, called Aliyah Bet. The Fifth Aliyah was again driven almost entirely from Europe, mostly from Central Europe (particularly from Poland, Germany, Austria, and Czechoslovakia), but also from Greece. Some Jewish immigrants also came from other countries such as Turkey, Iran, and Yemen. The Fifth Aliyah contained large numbers of professionals, doctors, lawyers, and professors, from Germany. Refugee architects and musicians introduced the Bauhaus style (the White City of Tel Aviv has the highest concentration of International Style architecture in the world with a strong element of Bauhaus) and founded the Palestine Philharmonic Orchestra. With the completion of the port at Haifa and its oil refineries, significant industry was added to the predominantly agricultural economy. The Jewish population reached 450,000 by 1940.

At the same time, tensions between Arabs and Jews grew during this period, leading to a series of Arab riots against the Jews in 1929 that left many dead and resulted in the depopulation of the Jewish community in Hebron. This was followed by more violence during the "Great Uprising" of 1936–1939. In response to the ever-increasing tension between the Arabic and Jewish communities married with the various commitments the British faced at the dawn of World War II, the British issued the White Paper of 1939, which severely restricted Jewish immigration to 75,000 people for five years. This served to create a relatively peaceful eight years in Palestine while the Holocaust unfolded in Europe.

Shortly after their rise to power, the Nazis negotiated the Ha'avara or "Transfer" Agreement with the Jewish Agency under which 50,000 German Jews and $100 million worth of their assets would be moved to Palestine.

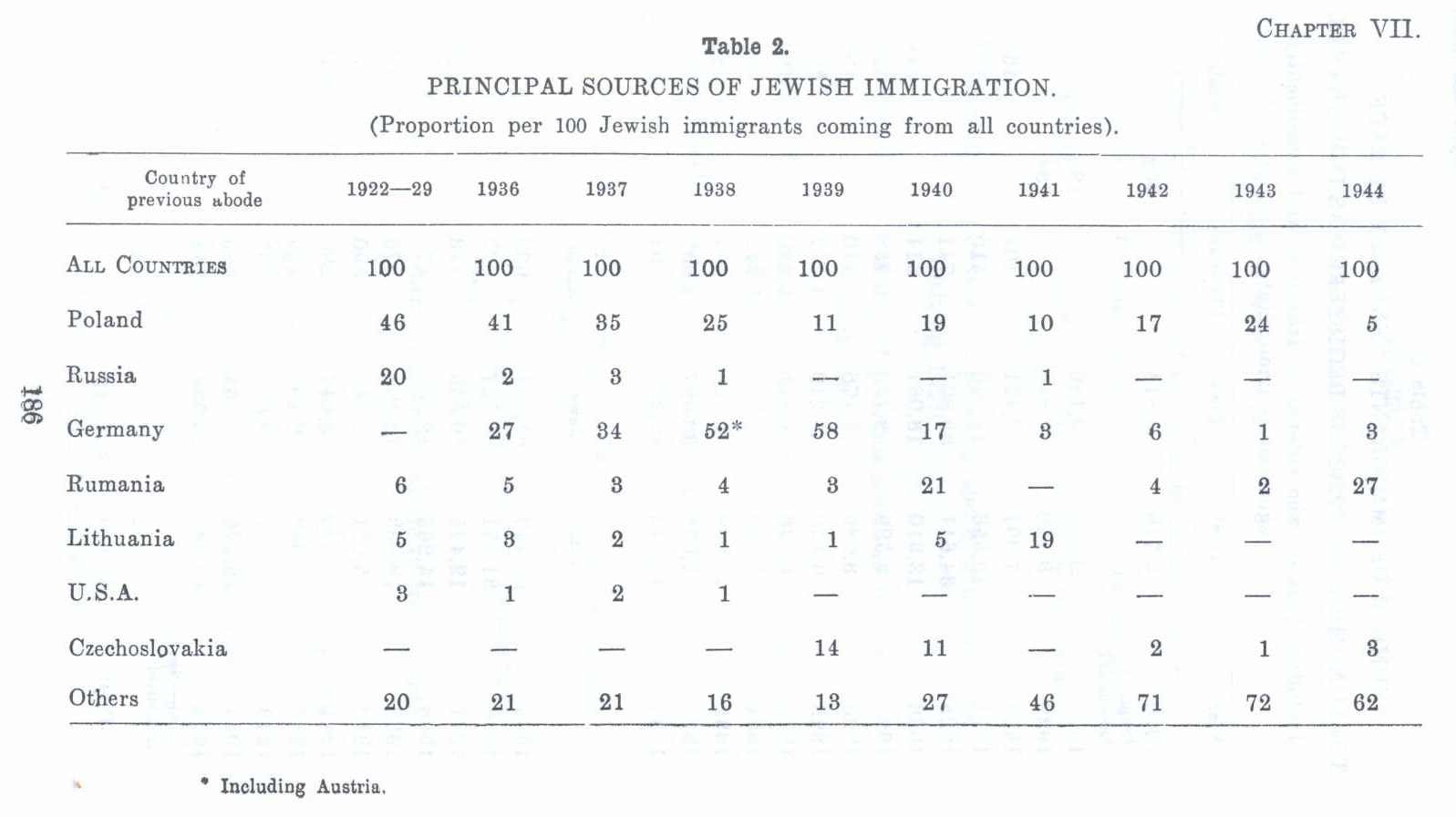
Survey of Palestine, showing place of origin of immigrants between 1922 and 1944

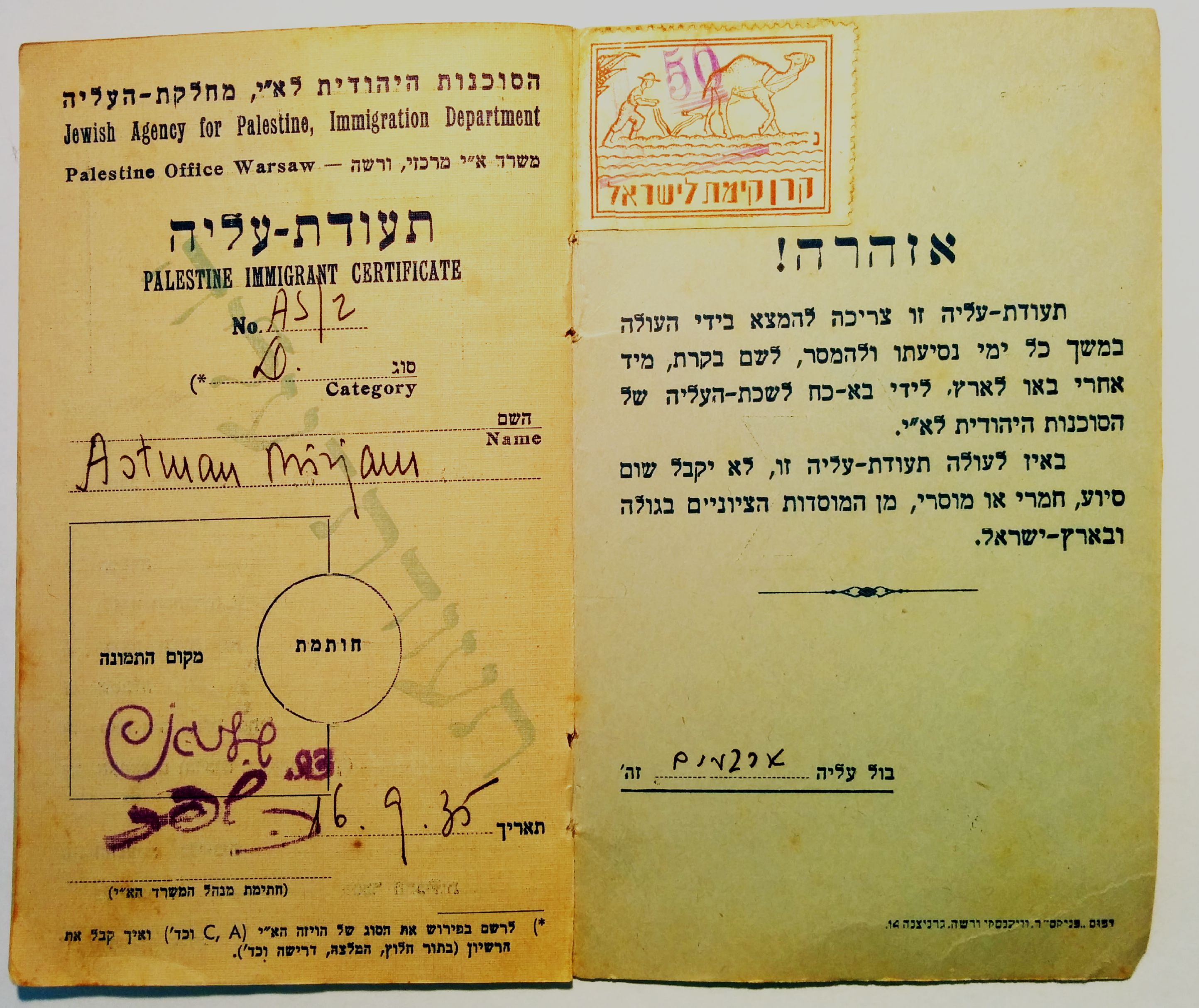
Certificate issued by the Jewish Agency in Warsaw, Poland, for immigrant to Mandatory Palestine, September 1935

==== Aliyah Bet: Illegal immigration (1933–1948) ====
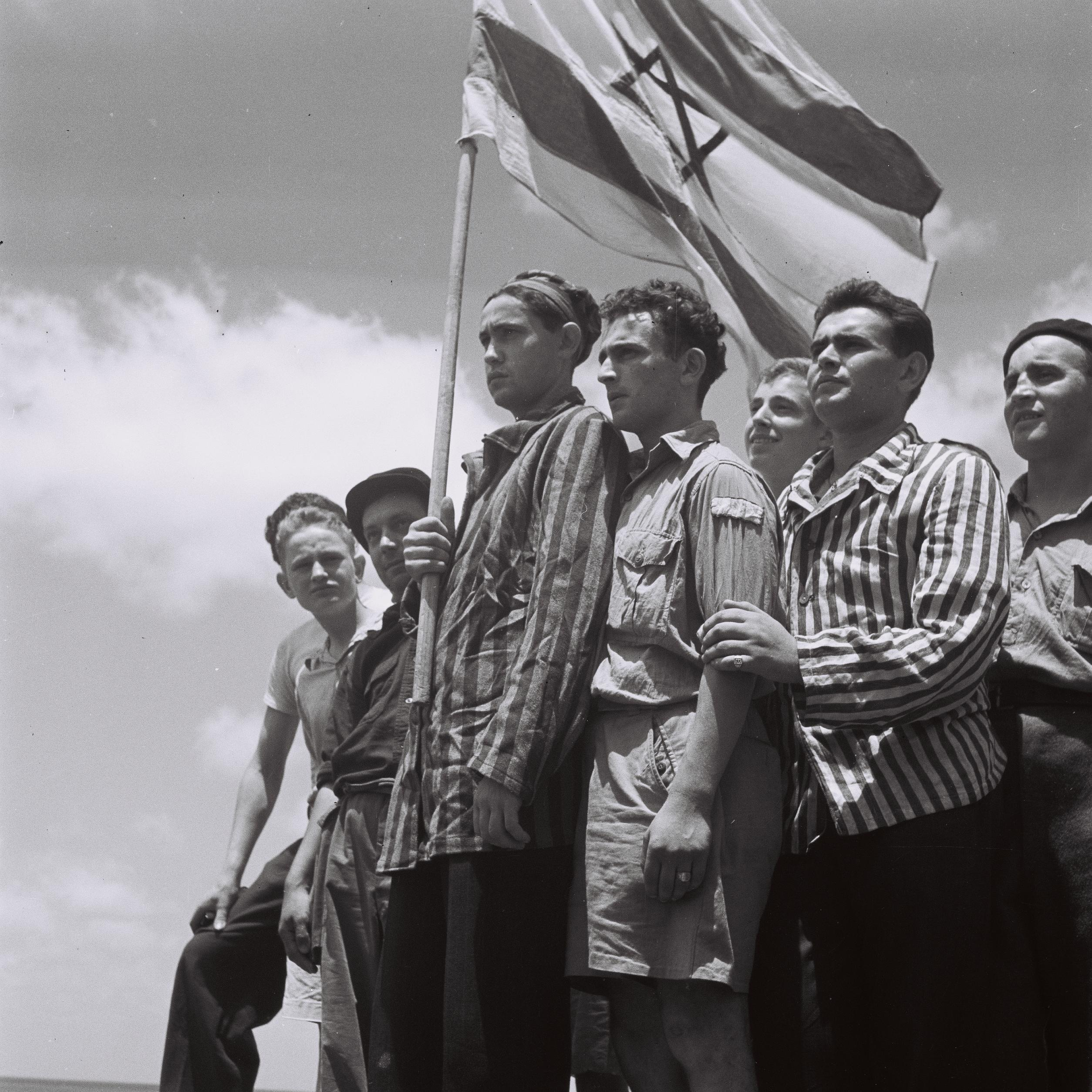
Buchenwald survivors arrive in Haifa to be arrested by the British, July 15, 1945

The British government limited Jewish immigration to Mandatory Palestine with quotas, and following the rise of Nazism to power in Germany, illegal immigration to Mandatory Palestine commenced. The illegal immigration was known as Aliyah Bet ("secondary immigration"), or Ha'apalah, and was organized by the Mossad Le'aliyah Bet, as well as by the Irgun. Immigration was done mainly by sea, and to a lesser extent overland through Iraq and Syria. During World War II and the years that followed until independence, Aliyah Bet became the main form of Jewish immigration to Mandatory Palestine.

Following the war, Bricha ("escape"), an organization of former partisans and ghetto fighters was primarily responsible for smuggling Jews from Eastern Europe through Poland. In 1946 Poland was the only Eastern Bloc country to allow free Jewish aliyah to Mandate Palestine without visas or exit permits. By contrast, Stalin forcibly brought Soviet Jews back who lived in occupied or soviet territory to USSR, as agreed by the Allies during the Yalta Conference. The refugees were sent to the Italian ports from which they traveled to Mandatory Palestine. More than 4,500 survivors left the French port of Sète aboard President Warfield (renamed Exodus). The British turned them back to France from Haifa, and forced them ashore in Hamburg. Despite British efforts to curb the illegal immigration, during the 14 years of its operation, 110,000 Jews immigrated to Palestine. In 1945 reports of the Holocaust with its 6 million Jewish killed, caused many Jews in Palestine to turn openly against the British Mandate, and illegal immigration escalated rapidly as many Holocaust survivors joined the aliyah.

=== Early statehood (1948–1960) ===
Immigration to Israel in the years following the May 1948 Israeli Declaration of Independence.
	1948	1949	1950	1951	1952	1953	1948-53
Eastern Europe							
Romania	17678	13595	47041	40625	3712	61	122712
Poland	28788	47331	25071	2529	264	225	104208
Bulgaria	15091	20008	1000	1142	461	359	38061
Czechoslovakia	2115	15685	263	150	24	10	18247
Hungary	3463	6842	2302	1022	133	224	13986
Soviet Union	1175	3230	2618	689	198	216	8126
Yugoslavia	4126	2470	427	572	88	14	7697
Total	72436	109161	78722	46729	4880	1109	313037
Other Europe							
Germany	1422	5329	1439	662	142	100	9094
France	640	1653	1165	548	227	117	4350
Austria	395	1618	746	233	76	45	3113
United Kingdom	501	756	581	302	233	140	2513
Greece	175	1364	343	122	46	71	2121
Italy	530	501	242	142	95	37	1547
Netherlands	188	367	265	282	112	95	1309
Belgium	-	615	297	196	51	44	1203
Total	3851	12203	5078	2487	982	649	25250
Asia							
Iraq	15	1708	31627	88161	868	375	122754
Yemen	270	35422	9203	588	89	26	45598
Turkey	4362	26295	2323	1228	271	220	34699
Iran	43	1778	11935	11048	4856	1096	30756
Aden	-	2636	190	328	35	58	3247
India	12	856	1105	364	49	650	3036
China	-	644	1207	316	85	160	2412
Other	-	1966	931	634	230	197	3958
Total	4702	71305	58521	102667	6483	2782	246460
Africa							
Tunisia	6821	17353	3725	3414	2548	606	34467
Libya	1064	14352	8818	6534	1146	224	32138
Morocco	-	-	4980	7770	5031	2990	20771
Egypt	-	7268	7154	2086	1251	1041	18800
Algeria	-	-	506	272	92	84	954
South Africa	178	217	154	35	11	33	628
Other	-	382	5	6	3	9	405
Total	8063	39572	25342	20117	10082	4987	108163
Unknown	13827	10942	1742	1901	948	820	30180
All countries	102879	243183	169405	173901	23375	10347	723090

After Aliyah Bet, the process of numbering or naming individual aliyot ceased, but immigration did not. A major wave of Jewish immigration, mainly from post-Holocaust Europe and the Arab and Muslim world took place from 1948 to 1951. In three and a half years, the Jewish population of Israel, which was 650,000 at the state's founding, was more than doubled by an influx of about 688,000 immigrants. In 1949, the largest-ever number of Jewish immigrants in a single year—249,954—arrived in Israel. This period of immigration is often termed kibbutz galuyot (literally, ingathering of exiles), due to the large number of Jewish diaspora communities that made aliyah. However, kibbutz galuyot can also refer to aliyah in general.

At the beginning of the immigration wave, most of the immigrants to reach Israel were Holocaust survivors from Europe, including many from displaced persons camps in Germany, Austria, and Italy, and from British detention camps on Cyprus. Large sections of shattered Jewish communities throughout Europe, such as those from Poland and Romania also immigrated to Israel, with some communities, such as those from Bulgaria and Yugoslavia, being almost entirely transferred. At the same time, the number of Jewish immigrants from Arab countries greatly increased. Special operations were undertaken to evacuate Jewish communities perceived to be in serious danger to Israel, such as Operation Magic Carpet, which evacuated almost the entire Jewish population of Yemen, and Operation Ezra and Nehemiah, which airlifted most of the Jews of Iraq to Israel. Egyptian Jews were smuggled to Israel in Operation Goshen. Nearly the entire Jewish population of Libya left for Israel around this time, and clandestine aliyah from Syria took place, as the Syrian government prohibited Jewish emigration, in a process that was to last decades. Israel also saw significant immigration of Jews from non-Arab Muslim countries such as Iran, Turkey, and Afghanistan in this period.

This resulted in a period of austerity. To ensure that Israel, which at that time had a small economy and scant foreign currency reserves, could provide for the immigrants, a strict regime of rationing was put in place. Measures were enacted to ensure that all Israeli citizens had access to adequate food, housing, and clothing. Austerity was very restrictive until 1953; the previous year, Israel had signed a reparations agreement with West Germany, in which the West German government would pay Israel as compensation for the Holocaust, due to Israel's taking in a large number of Holocaust survivors. The resulting influx of foreign capital boosted the Israeli economy and allowed for the relaxing of most restrictions. The remaining austerity measures were gradually phased out throughout the following years. When new immigrants arrived in Israel, they were sprayed with DDT, underwent a medical examination, were inoculated against diseases, and were given food. The earliest immigrants received desirable homes in established urban areas, but most of the immigrants were then sent to transit camps, known initially as immigrant camps, and later as Ma'abarot. Many were also initially housed in reception centers in military barracks. By the end of 1950, some 93,000 immigrants were housed in 62 transit camps. The Israeli government's goal was to get the immigrants out of refugee housing and into society as speedily as possible. Immigrants who left the camps received a ration card, an identity card, a mattress, a pair of blankets, and $21 to $36 in cash. They settled either in established cities and towns, or in kibbutzim and moshavim. Many others stayed in the Ma'abarot as they were gradually turned into permanent cities and towns, which became known as development towns, or were absorbed as neighborhoods of the towns they were attached to, and the tin dwellings were replaced with permanent housing.

In the early 1950s, the immigration wave subsided, and emigration increased; ultimately, some 10% of the immigrants would leave Israel for other countries in the following years. In 1953, immigration to Israel averaged 1,200 a month, while emigration averaged 700 a month. The end of the period of mass immigration gave Israel a critical opportunity to more rapidly absorb the immigrants still living in transit camps. The Israeli government built 260 new settlements and 78,000 housing units to accommodate the immigrants, and by the mid-1950s, almost all were in permanent housing. The last ma'abarot closed in 1963.

In the mid-1950s, a smaller wave of immigration began from North African countries such as Morocco, Tunisia, Algeria, and Egypt, many of which were in the midst of nationalist struggles. Between 1952 and 1964, some 240,000 North African Jews came to Israel. During this period, smaller but significant numbers arrived from other places such as Europe, Iran, India, and Latin America. In particular, a small immigration wave from then communist Poland, known as the "Gomulka Aliyah", took place during this period. From 1956 to 1960, Poland permitted free Jewish emigration, and some 50,000 Polish Jews immigrated to Israel.

Since the founding of the State of Israel, the Jewish Agency for Israel was mandated as the organization responsible for aliyah in the diaspora.

=== From Arab countries ===
From 1948 until the early 1970s, around 900,000 Jews from Arab lands left, fled, or were expelled from various Arab nations, of which an estimated 650,000 settled in Israel. In the course of Operation Magic Carpet (1949–1950), nearly the entire community of Yemenite Jews (about 49,000) immigrated to Israel. Its other name, Operation On Wings of Eagles (Hebrew: כנפי נשרים, Kanfei Nesharim), was inspired by

Exodus 19:4: "Ye have seen what I did unto the Egyptians, and how I bare you on eagles' wings, and brought you unto myself."

and

Isaiah 40:31: "But they that wait upon the LORD shall renew their strength; they shall mount up with wings as eagles; they shall run, and not be weary; and they shall walk, and not faint".

Some 120,000 Iraqi Jews were airlifted to Israel in Operation Ezra and Nehemiah.

=== From Iran ===
Following the establishment of Israel, about one-third of Iranian Jews, most of them poor, immigrated to Israel, and immigration from Iran continued throughout the following decades. An estimated 70,000 Iranian Jews immigrated to Israel between 1948 and 1978. Following the Islamic Revolution in 1979, most of the Iranian Jewish community left, with some 20,000 Iranian Jews immigrating to Israel. Many Iranian Jews also settled in the United States (especially in New York City and Los Angeles).

=== From Ethiopia ===
The first major wave of aliyah from Ethiopia took place in the mid-1970s. The massive airlift known as Operation Moses began to bring Ethiopian Jews to Israel on November 18, 1984, and ended on January 5, 1985. During those six weeks, some 6,500–8,000 Ethiopian Jews were flown from Sudan to Israel. An estimated 2,000–4,000 Jews died en route to Sudan or in Sudanese refugee camps. In 1991 Operation Solomon was launched to bring the Beta Israel Jews of Ethiopia. In one day, May 24, 34 aircraft landed at Addis Ababa and brought 14,325 Jews from Ethiopia to Israel. Since that time, Ethiopian Jews have continued to immigrate to Israel bringing the number of Ethiopian-Israelis today to over 100,000.

=== From Romania ===
After the war, Romania had second-largest Jewish population in Europe, of around 350,000 or higher. In 1949, 118,939 Romanian Jews had immigrated to Israel since the war ended.

Romanian Jews were, under their own will, "sold" or "exchanged" to Israel in the 1950s with the help of the American Jewish Joint Distribution Committee for about 8,000 lei (about 420 dollars). The price of these Jews usually varied according to their "worth". This practice continued at a slower pace from 1965 under Nicolae Ceaușescu, a Romanian communist leader. During the 1950s, West Germany had been also paying Romania an amount of money in exchange for some Germans of Romania, and, just like the Jews (both of which were regarded as "co-nationals"), their price was "calculated". Ceaușescu, happy with these policies, even declared that "oil, Germans, and Jews are our most important export commodities".

Israeli government paid to facilitate aliyah, and around 235,000 people emigrated from Romania to Israel under this agreement. When Romania was under control of Gheorghe Gheorghiu-Dej, he received 10 million dollars per year, and only he had the access to the money transferred to the secret account. Israel also bought Romanian goods and invested into Romania's economy. After his death, Ceauşescu practically sold the Jews to Israel, and received between 4,000 and $6,000 per person. Israel could have transferred nearly 60 million dollars for the aliyah. Another estimation is higher - according to Radu Ioanid, "Ceausescu sold 40,577 Jews to Israel for $112,498,800, at a price of $2,500 and later at $3,300 per head."

=== From the Soviet Union and post-Soviet states ===
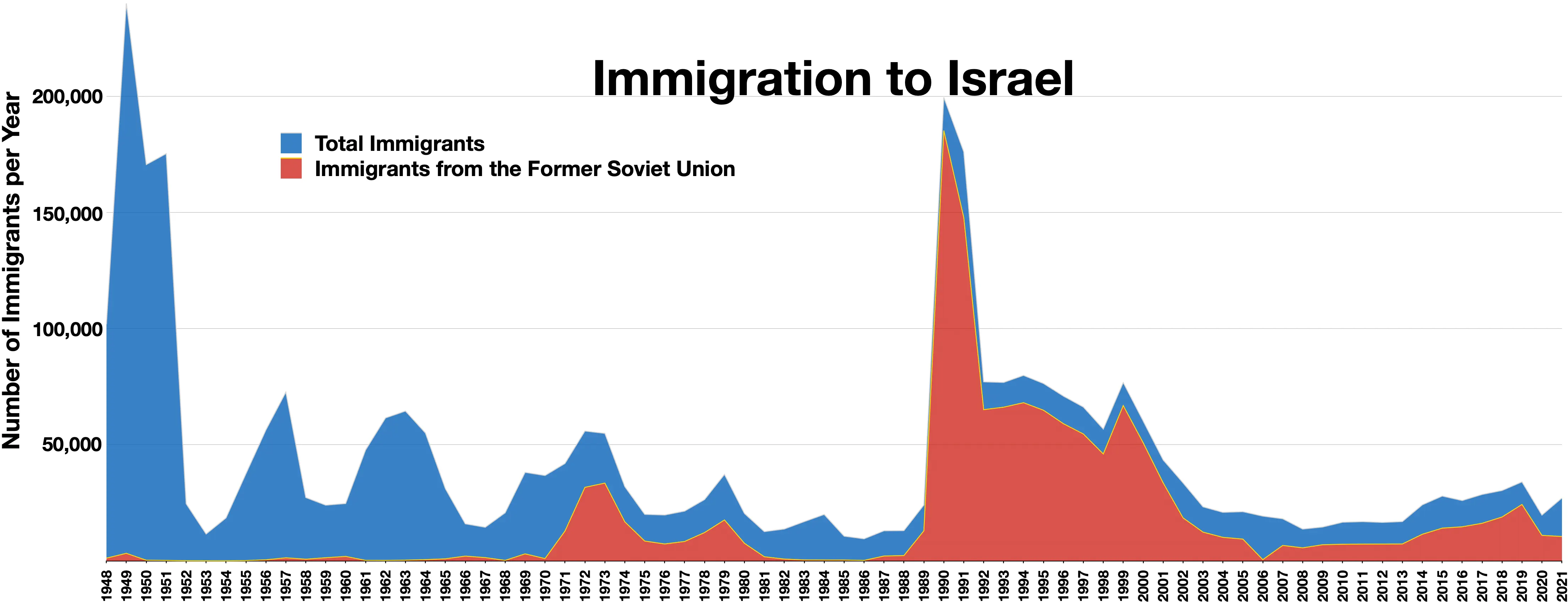
Immigration to Israel Total Immigrants Immigrants from the USSR and Post-Soviet states

Soviet authorities break up a demonstration of Jewish refuseniks in front of the Ministry of Internal Affairs for the right to immigrate to Israel, January 10, 1973

A mass emigration was politically undesirable for the Soviet regime. The only acceptable ground was family reunification, and a formal petition ("вызов", vyzov) from a relative from abroad was required for the processing to begin. Often, the result was a formal refusal. The risks to apply for an exit visa compounded because the entire family had to quit their jobs, which in turn would make them vulnerable to charges of social parasitism, a criminal offense. Because of these hardships, Israel set up the group Lishkat Hakesher in the early 1950s to maintain contact and promote aliyah with Jews behind the Iron Curtain.

From Israel's establishment in 1948 to the Six-Day War in 1967, Soviet aliyah remained minimal. Those who made aliyah during this period were mainly elderly people granted clearance to leave for family reunification purposes. Only about 22,000 Soviet Jews managed to reach Israel. In the wake of the Six-Day War, the USSR broke off the diplomatic relations with the Jewish state. An Anti-Zionist propaganda campaign in the state-controlled mass media and the rise of Zionology were accompanied by harsher discrimination of the Soviet Jews. By the end of the 1960s, Jewish cultural and religious life in the Soviet Union had become practically impossible, and the majority of Soviet Jews were assimilated and non-religious, but this new wave of state-sponsored anti-Semitism on one hand, and the sense of pride for victorious Jewish nation over Soviet-armed Arab armies on the other, stirred up Zionist feelings.

After the Dymshits-Kuznetsov hijacking affair and the crackdown that followed, strong international condemnations caused the Soviet authorities to increase the emigration quota. In the years 1960–1970, the USSR let only 4,000 people leave; in the following decade, the number rose to 250,000. The exodus of Soviet Jews began in 1968.

Year	Exit visas to Israel	Immigrants from the USSR
1968	231	231
1969	3,033	3,033
1970	999	999
1971	12,897	12,893
1972	31,903	31,652
1973	34,733	33,277
1974	20,767	16,888
1975	13,363	8,435
1976	14,254	7,250
1977	16,833	8,350
1978	28,956	12,090
1979	51,331	17,278
1980	21,648	7,570
1981	9,448	1,762
1982	2,692	731
1983	1,314	861
1984	896	340
1985	1,140	348
1986	904	201

Between 1968 and 1973, almost all Soviet Jews allowed to leave settled in Israel, and only a small minority moved to other Western countries. However, in the following years, the number of those moving to other Western nations increased. Soviet Jews granted permission to leave were taken by train to Austria to be processed and then flown to Israel. There, the ones who chose not to go to Israel, called "dropouts", exchanged their immigrant invitations to Israel for refugee status in a Western country, especially the United States. Eventually, most Soviet Jews granted permission to leave became dropouts. Overall, between 1970 and 1988, some 291,000 Soviet Jews were granted exit visas, of whom 165,000 moved to Israel and 126,000 moved to the United States. In 1989 a record 71,000 Soviet Jews were granted exodus from the USSR, of whom only 12,117 immigrated to Israel.

In 1989 the United States changed its immigration policy of unconditionally granting Soviet Jews refugee status. That same year, Soviet Premier Mikhail Gorbachev ended restrictions on Jewish immigration, and the Soviet Union itself collapsed in 1991. Since then, about a million people from the former Soviet Union immigrated to Israel, including approximately 240,000 who were not Jewish according to rabbinical law, but were eligible for Israeli citizenship under the Law of Return.

The number of immigrants counted as halachically non-Jewish from the former USSR has been constantly rising ever since 1989. For example, in 1990 around 96% of the immigrants were halachically Jewish and only 4% were non-Jewish family members. However, in 2000, the proportion was: Jews (includes children from non-Jewish father and Jewish mother) - 47%, Non-Jewish spouses of Jews - 14%, children from Jewish father and non-Jewish mother - 17%, Non-Jewish spouses of children from Jewish father and non-Jewish mother - 6%, non-Jews with a Jewish grandparent - 14% & Non-Jewish spouses of non-Jews with a Jewish grandparent - 2%.

Following the beginning of the Russo-Ukrainian War, Ukrainian Jews making aliyah from Ukraine reached 142% higher during the first four months of 2014 compared to the previous year. In 2014, aliyah from the former Soviet Union went up 50% from the previous year with some 11,430 people or approximately 43% of all Jewish immigrants arrived from the former Soviet Union, propelled from the increase from Ukraine with some 5,840 new immigrants have come from Ukraine over the course of the year.

The wave of aliyah from Russia since 2014 has been called "Putin's aliyah", "Putin's exodus", and "cheese aliyah" (foreign cheese was one of the first products to disappear from Russian shops because of anti-sanctions imposed by the Russian government). The number of repatriants in this wave is comparable with that coming from the USSR between 1970 and 1988.

Following 2022 Russian invasion of Ukraine, Israel announced "Immigrants Come Home" operation. As of June 2022, more than 25,000 people arrived in Israel from Ukraine, Russia, Belarus and Moldova.

=== From Latin America ===
In Argentina, the political and economic crisis of 1999–2002 led to a severe banking collapse, resulting in the loss of billions of dollars in deposits and significantly affecting the country's middle class. During this period, most of the estimated 200,000 Jews in Argentina were directly impacted. Approximately 4,400 individuals chose to start anew and immigrate to Israel, where they saw new opportunities. Since 2000, over 10,000 Argentine Jews have moved to Israel, joining the thousands of Argentine immigrants who had already settled there.

In Uruguay, the Jewish community, which had reached its peak in the 1960s, began to decline in the 1970s due to a period of political turmoil. However, by the early 21st century, following an economic crisis, a portion of the country's Jewish community chose to make aliyah, with approximately 22,000 members remaining in Uruguay. It continued to be one of the largest Jewish communities on the continent, both in terms of absolute numbers and as a percentage of the total population.

During 2002 and 2003 the Jewish Agency for Israel launched an intensive public campaign to promote aliyah from the region, and offered additional economic aid for immigrants from Argentina. Although the economy of Argentina improved, and some who had immigrated to Israel from Argentina moved back following South American country's economic growth from 2003 onwards, Argentine Jews continue to immigrate to Israel, albeit in smaller numbers than before. The Argentine community in Israel is about 50,000-70,000 people, the largest Latin American group in the country.

In Venezuela, growing antisemitism in the country, including antisemitic violence, caused an increasing number of Jews to move to Israel during the 2000s. For the first time in Venezuelan history, Jews began leaving for Israel in the hundreds. By November 2010, more than half of Venezuela's 20,000-strong Jewish community had left the country.

=== From France ===
From 2000 to 2009, more than 13,000 French Jews immigrated to Israel, largely as a result of growing anti-semitism in the country. A peak was reached in 2005, with 2,951 immigrants. However, between 20 and 30% eventually returned to France.

In 2012, some 200,000 French citizens lived in Israel. During the same year, following the election of François Hollande and the Jewish school shooting in Toulouse, as well as ongoing acts of anti-semitism and the European economic crisis, an increasing number of French Jews began buying property in Israel. In August 2012, it was reported that anti-semitic attacks had risen by 40% in the five months following the Toulouse shooting, and that many French Jews were seriously considering immigrating to Israel. In 2013, 3,120 French Jews immigrated to Israel, marking a 63% increase over the previous year. In the first two months of 2014, French Jewish aliyah increased precipitously by 312% with 854 French Jews making aliyah over the first two months. Immigration from France throughout 2014 has been attributed to several factors, of which includes increasing antisemitism, in which many Jews have been harassed and attacked by a fusillade of local thugs and gangs, a stagnant European economy and concomitant high youth unemployment rates.

During the first few months of 2014, The Jewish Agency of Israel continued to encourage an increase of French aliyah through aliyah fairs, Hebrew language courses, sessions which help potential immigrants to find jobs in Israel, and immigrant absorption in Israel. A May 2014 survey revealed that 74 percent of French Jews considered leaving France for Israel; of those considering leaving, 29.9 percent cited anti-Semitism. Another 24.4 cited their desire to “preserve their Judaism,” while 12.4 percent said they were attracted by other countries. “Economic considerations” was cited by 7.5 percent of the respondents. By June 2014, it was estimated by the end of 2014 a full 1 percent of the French Jewish community will have made aliyah to Israel, the largest in a single year. Many Jewish leaders stated the emigration is being driven by a combination of factors, including the cultural gravitation towards Israel and France's economic woes, especially for the younger generation drawn by the possibility of other socioeconomic opportunities in the more vibrant Israeli economy. During the Hebrew year 5774 (September 2013 - September 2014) for the first time ever, more Jews made aliyah from France than any other country, numbering approximately 6,000 and fleeing antisemitism, violence and economic malaise.

In January 2015, events such as the Charlie Hebdo shooting and Porte de Vincennes hostage crisis created a shock wave of fear across the French Jewish community. As a result of these events, the Jewish Agency planned an aliyah plan for 120,000 French Jews who wished to make aliyah. In addition, with Europe's stagnant economy, many affluent French Jewish skilled professionals, businesspeople and investors sought Israel as a start-up haven for international investments, as well as for job and new business opportunities. In addition, Dov Maimon, a French Jewish émigré who studies migration as a senior fellow at the Jewish People Policy Institute, expects as many as 250,000 French Jews to make aliyah by 2030.

Hours after an attack and an ISIS flag was raised on a gas factory near Lyon where the severed head of a local businessman was pinned to the gates on June 26, 2015, Immigration and Absorption Minister Ze’ev Elkin strongly urged the French Jewish community to move to Israel and made it a national priority for Israel to welcome French Jews with open arms. Immigration from France increased: in the first half of 2015, approximately 5,100 French Jews made aliyah to Israel, or 25% more than in the same period during the previous year.

Following the November 2015 Paris attacks committed by suspected ISIS affiliates in retaliation for Opération Chammal, one source reported that 80 percent of French Jews were considering making aliyah. According to the Jewish Agency, nearly 6,500 French Jews made aliyah between January and November 2015.

=== From North America ===
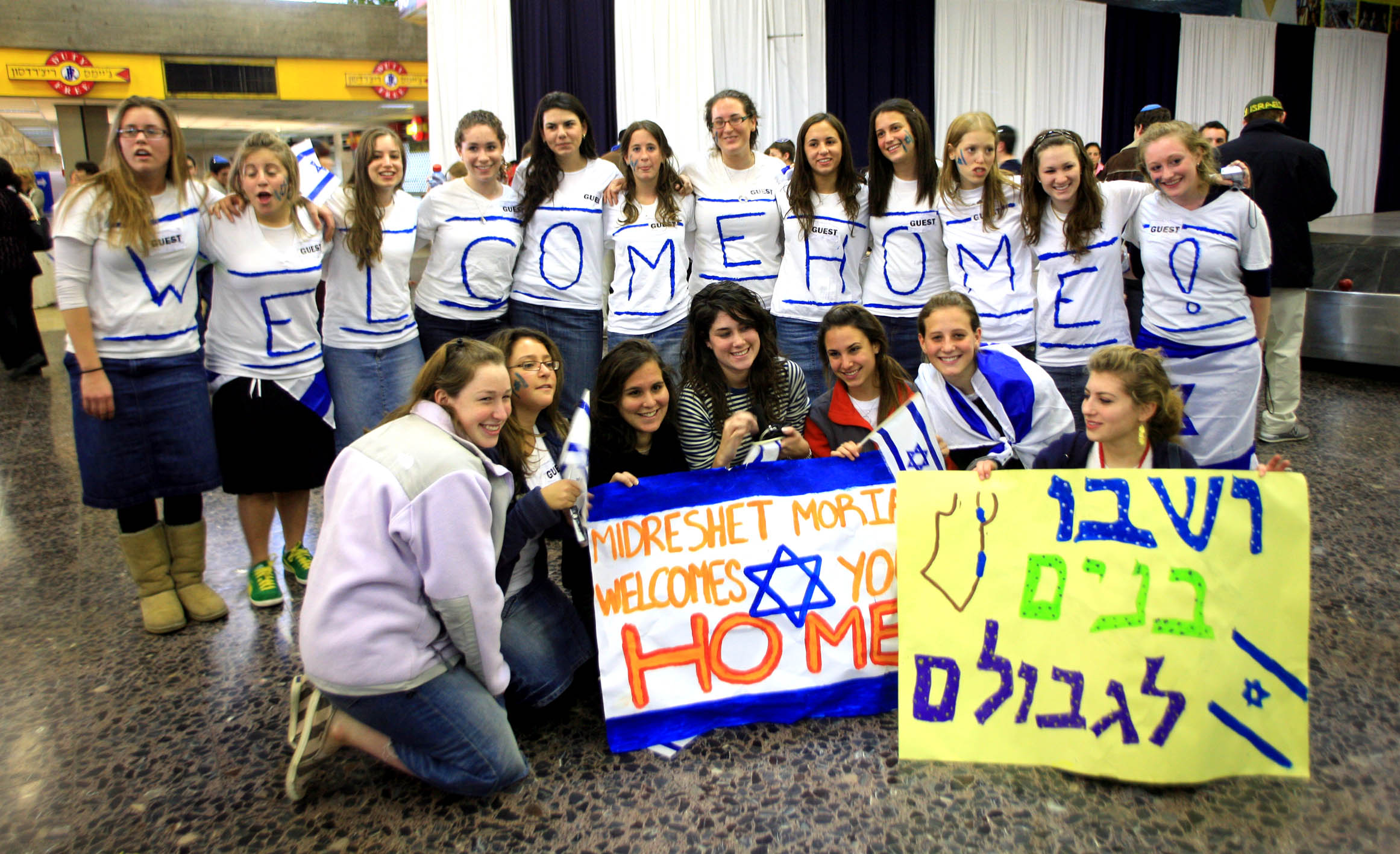
Nefesh B'Nefesh group welcomes North American immigrants to Israel

More than 200,000 North American immigrants live in Israel. There has been a steady flow of immigration from North America since Israel's inception in 1948.

Several thousand American Jews moved to Mandate Palestine before the State of Israel was established. From Israel's establishment in 1948 to the Six-Day War in 1967, aliyah from the United States and Canada was minimal. In 1959, a former President of the Association of Americans and Canadians in Israel estimated that out of the 35,000 American and Canadian Jews who had made aliyah, only 6,000 remained.

Following the Six-Day War in 1967, and the subsequent euphoria among world Jewry, significant numbers arrived in the late 1960s and 1970s, whereas it had been a mere trickle before. Between 1967 and 1973, 60,000 North American Jews immigrated to Israel. However, many of them later returned to their original countries. An estimated 58% of American Jews who immigrated to Israel between 1961 and 1972 ended up returning to the United States.

Like Western European immigrants, North Americans tend to immigrate to Israel more for religious, ideological, and political purposes, and not financial or security ones. Many immigrants began arriving in Israel after the First and Second Intifada, with a total of 3,052 arriving in 2005 — the highest number since 1983.

Nefesh B'Nefesh, founded in 2002 by Rabbi Yehoshua Fass and Tony Gelbart, works to encourage aliyah from North America and the UK by providing financial assistance, employment services and streamlined governmental procedures. Nefesh B’Nefesh works in cooperation with the Jewish Agency and the Israeli Government in increasing the numbers of North American and British immigrants.

After the 2008 financial crisis, American Jewish immigration to Israel rose. This wave of immigration was triggered by Israel's lower unemployment rate, combined with financial incentives offered to new Jewish immigrants. In 2009, aliyah was at its highest in 36 years, with 3,324 North American Jews making aliyah.

=== Since the 1990s ===
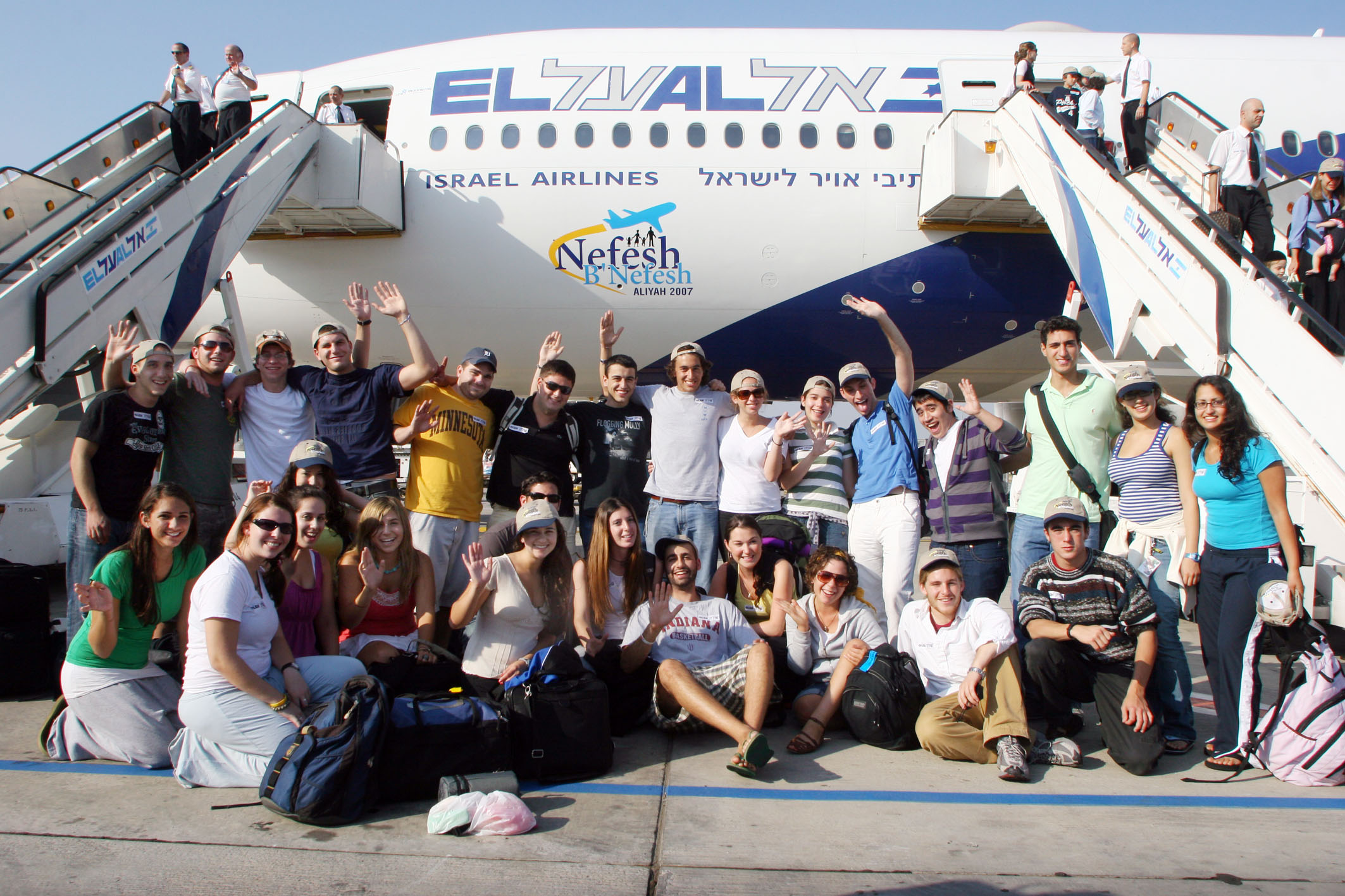
New immigrants in Ben Gurion airport in Israel, 2007

Since the mid-1990s, there has been a steady stream of South African, American and French Jews who have either made aliyah, or purchased property in Israel for potential future immigration. Over 2,000 French Jews moved to Israel each year between 2000 and 2004 due to anti-Semitism in France. The Bnei Menashe Jews from India, whose recent discovery and recognition by mainstream Judaism as descendants of the Ten Lost Tribes is subject to some controversy, slowly started their aliyah in the early 1990s and continue arriving in slow numbers. Organizations such as Nefesh B'Nefesh and Shavei Israel help with aliyah by supporting financial aid and guidance on a variety of topics such as finding work, learning Hebrew, and assimilation into Israeli culture.

In early 2007 Haaretz reported that aliyah for the year of 2006 was down approximately 9% from 2005, "the lowest number of immigrants recorded since 1988". The number of new immigrants in 2007 was 18,127, the lowest since 1988. Only 36% of these new immigrants came from the former Soviet Union (close to 90% in the 1990s) while the number of immigrants from countries like France and the United States was stable. Some 15,452 immigrants arrived in Israel in 2008 and 16,465 in 2009. On October 20, 2009, the first group of Kaifeng Jews arrived in Israel, in an aliyah operation coordinated by Shavei Israel. Shalom Life reported that over 19,000 new immigrants arrived in Israel in 2010, an increase of 16 percent over 2009.

As reported by the Ministry of Immigration and Refugees, there has been a decline in immigration to Israel since the onset of Hamas' conflict with Israel on October 7, 2023. The ministry indicates that immigration to Israel in 2023 has fallen by 30% in comparison to 2024. The Central Bureau of Statistics announced in December 2024 that 82,700 Israelis departed from the country in the previous year, marking a notable rise compared to the year before and indicating a deceleration in population growth. This was the first instance in which the bureau incorporated long-term foreign residents into its census data.

==== Paternity testing ====
In 2013, the office of the Prime Minister of Israel announced that some people born out of wedlock, "wishing to immigrate to Israel could be subjected to DNA testing" to prove their paternity is as they claim. A Foreign Ministry spokesman said the genetic paternity testing idea is based on the recommendations of Nativ, an Israeli government organization that has helped Soviet and post-Soviet Jews with aliyah since the 1950s.

== Holiday ==
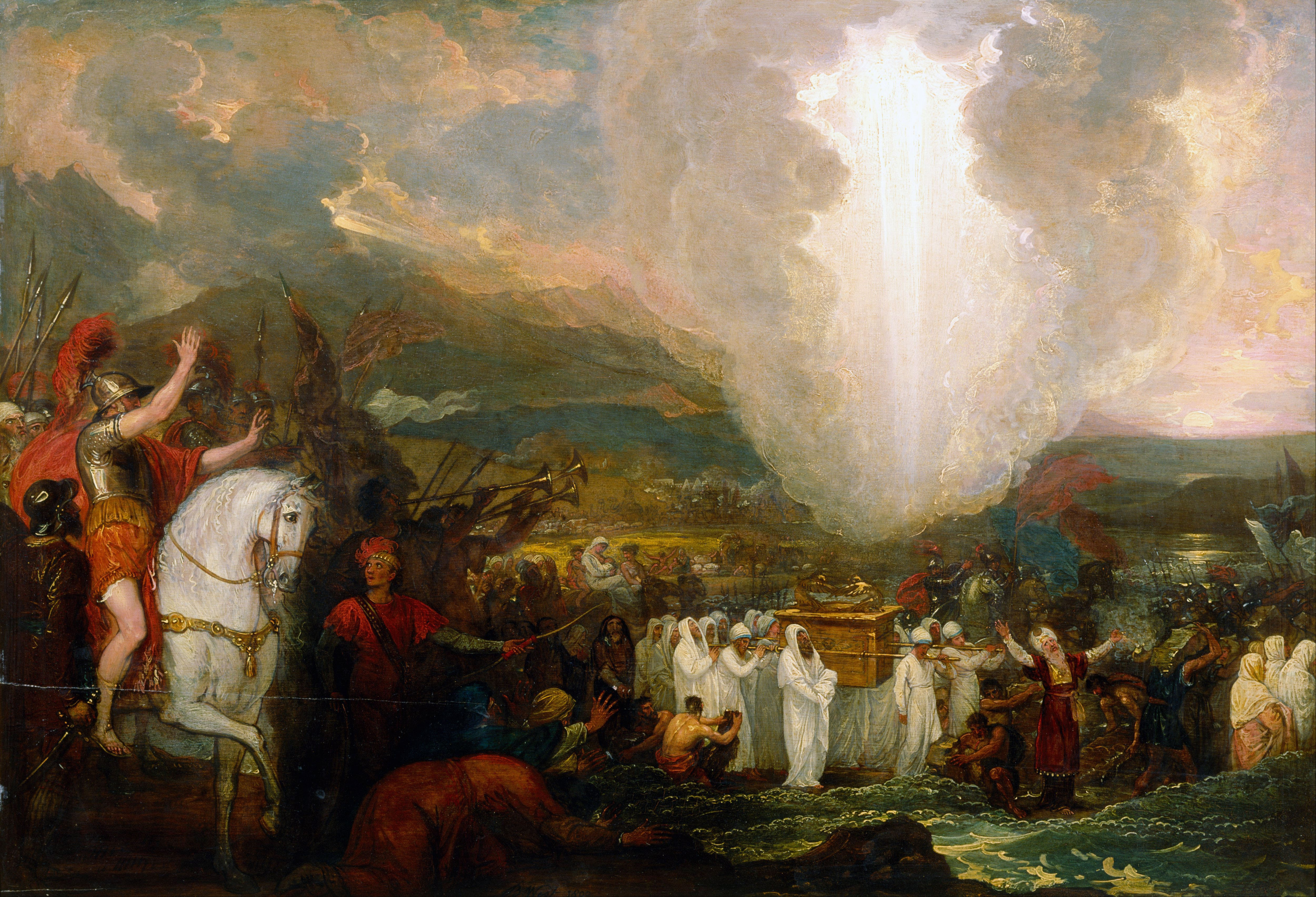
Joshua Passing the River Jordan with the Ark of the Covenant, Benjamin West, 1800

Yom HaAliyah (Aliyah Day) (Hebrew: יום העלייה) is an Israeli national holiday celebrated annually according to the Jewish calendar on the tenth of the Hebrew month of Nisan to commemorate the Jewish people entering the Land of Israel as written in the Hebrew Bible, which happened on the tenth of the Hebrew month of Nisan (Hebrew: י' ניסן). The holiday was also established to acknowledge Aliyah, immigration to the Jewish state, as a core value of the State of Israel, and honor the ongoing contributions of Olim, Jewish immigrants, to Israeli society. Yom HaAliyah is also observed in Israeli schools on the seventh of the Hebrew month of Cheshvan.

The opening clause of the Yom HaAliyah Law states:

מטרתו של חוק זה לקבוע יום ציון שנתי להכרה בחשיבותה של העלייה לארץ ישראל כבסיס לקיומה של מדינת ישראל, להתפתחותה ולעיצובה כחברה רב־תרבותית, ולציון מועד הכניסה לארץ ישראל שאירע ביום י׳ בניסן.

The purpose of this law is to set an annual holiday to recognize the importance of Jewish immigration to the Land of Israel as the basis for the existence of the State of Israel, its development and design as a multicultural society, and to mark the date of entry into the Land of Israel that happened on the tenth of Nisan.

— Yom HaAliyah Law

The original day chosen for Yom HaAliyah, the tenth of Nisan, is laden with symbolism. Although a modern holiday created by the Knesset of Israel, the tenth of Nisan is a date of religious significance for the Jewish People as recounted in the Hebrew Bible and in traditional Jewish thought.

On the tenth of Nisan, according to the biblical narrative in the Book of Joshua, Joshua and the Israelites crossed the Jordan River at Gilgal into the Promised Land while carrying the Ark of the Covenant. It was thus the first documented "mass aliyah." On that day, God commanded the Israelites to commemorate and celebrate the occasion by erecting twelve stones with the text of the Torah engraved upon them. The stones represented the entirety of the Jewish nation's twelve tribes and their gratitude for God's gift of the Land of Israel (Hebrew: אֶרֶץ יִשְׂרָאֵל, Modern: Eretz Yisrael, Tiberian: ʼÉreṣ Yiśrāʼēl) to them.

Yom HaAliyah, as a modern holiday celebration, began in 2009 as a grassroots community initiative and young Olim self-initiated movement in Tel Aviv, spearheaded by the TLV Internationals organization of the Am Yisrael Foundation. On June 21, 2016, the Twentieth Knesset voted in favor of codifying the grassroots initiative into law by officially adding Yom HaAliyah to the Israeli national calendar. The Yom HaAliyah bill was co-sponsored by Knesset members from different parties in a rare instance of cooperation across the political spectrum of the opposition and coalition.

== Statistics ==
=== Recent trends ===
Top aliyah sending countries:
Country	2017	2018	2019	2020	2021	2022
Russia		10,673	16,060	6,507	7,500	43,685
Ukraine		6,561	6,329	2,917	2,123	15,213
United States		3,052	3,141	2,661	4,000	3,261
France		2,723	2,470	2,351	2,819	2,049 (Note: Between January 1 and December 1, 2022)
Ethiopia	1,467		665	712	1,589	1,498 (Note: Part of Operation Tzur Israel)
Belarus		969	945	586	780	1,993 (Note: Between January 1 and December 1, 2022)
Brazil	693	673			438	356 (Note: Between January 1 and December 1, 2022)
United Kingdom		523			490	526 (Note: Between January 1 and December 1, 2022)
Canada		347				
Argentina	286	340			633	985 (Note: Between January 1 and December 1, 2022)
South Africa		332	442	280	373	426 (Note: Between January 1 and December 1, 2022)
Turkey	401	203	318			
Germany		185				
Venezuela	152	174				
Belgium		121				
Mexico		110				
Switzerland		91				
Italy		86				
Hungary		43				
Total	29,509	30,403	35,651	21,120	28,601	74,915

=== Historic data ===
The number of immigrants since 1882 by period, continent of birth, and country of birth is given in the table below. Continent of birth and country of birth data is almost always unavailable or nonexistent for before 1919.

Region/Country	1882– 1918	1919– 1948	1948– 1951	1952– 1960	1961– 1971	1972– 1979	1980– 1989	1990– 2001	2002– 2010	2011– 2020	Total
Africa		4,033	93,282	143,485	164,885	19,273	28,664	55,619	31,558	20,843	561,642
(Ethiopian Empire) Abyssinia→ Ethiopia and Eritrea		0	10	59	98	309	16,971	45,131	23,613	10,500	96,691
Algeria		994	3,810	3,433	12,857	2,137	1,830	1,682	1,967	324	29,034
Egypt and Sudan		0	16,028	17,521	2,963	535	372	202	166	21	37,808
Libya		873	30,972	2,079	2,466	219	67	94	36	5	36,811
Morocco		0	28,263	95,945	130,507	7,780	3,809	3,276	2,113	384	272,077
South Africa		259	666	774	3,783	5,604	3,575	3,283	1,693	2,560	22,197
Tunisia		0	13,293	23,569	11,566	2,148	1,942	1,607	1,871	398	56,394
Zimbabwe		0	37	22	145	393	82	26	14		719
Other (Africa)		1,907	203	83	500	148	16	318	85	24	3,284
Americas and Oceania		7,579	3,822	6,922	42,400	45,040	39,369	39,662	36,209	51,370	272,373
Argentina		238	904	2,888	11,701	13,158	10,582	11,248	9,450	3,150	63,319
Australia		0	116	107	742	1,146	835	977	524		4,447
Bolivia		0	0	0	199	94	80	53	84		510
Brazil		0	304	763	2,601	1,763	1,763	2,356	2,037	4,320	15,907
Canada		316	236	276	2,169	2,178	1,867	1,963	1,700	6,340	17,045
Chile		0	48	401	1,790	1,180	1,040	683	589		5,731
Colombia		0	0	0	415	552	475	657	965		3,064
Cuba		0	14	88	405	79	42	629	606		1,863
Ecuador		0	0	0	40	38	44	67	69		258
Mexico		0	48	168	736	861	993	1,049	697		4,552
New Zealand		70	0	13	91	129	124	142	42		611
Panama		0	0	0	64	43	48	50	40		245
Peru		0	0	0	269	243	358	612	1,539		3,021
United States	2,000	6,635	1,711	1,553	18,671	20,963	18,904	17,512	15,445	32,000	135,394
Uruguay		0	66	425	1,844	2,199	2,014	983	1,555		9,086
Venezuela		0	0	0	297	245	180	418	602		1,742
Other (Central America)		0	17	43	129	104	8	153	157		611
Other (South America)		0	42	194	89	62	0	66	96		549
Other (Americas/Oceania)		318	313	0	148	3	8	44	12		846
Asia		40,776	237,704	37,119	56,208	19,456	14,433	75,687	17,300	1,370	500,053
Afghanistan		0	2,303	1,106	516	132	57	21	13		4,148
(Myanmar) Burma		0	0	0	147	83	383	138	33		784
China		0	504	217	96	43	78	277	74	190	1,479
Cyprus		0	21	35	28	21	12	32	0		149
India, Pakistan, Bangladesh, and Sri Lanka		0	2,176	5,380	13,110	3,497	1,539	2,055	961	1,180	29,898
Indonesia, Malaysia and the Philippines		0	101	46	54	40	60	205	42		548
(Pahlavi Iran) → Iran		3,536	21,910	15,699	19,502	9,550	8,487	4,326	1,097		84,107
Iraq		0	123,371	2,989	2,129	939	111	1,325	130		130,994
Israel (Note: Those born in Israel who repatriated later in their life.)		0	411	868	1,021	507	288	1,148	1,448		5,691
Japan		0	0	9	25	34	57	98	32		255
Jordan		0	6	9	23	6	9	15	0		68
Lebanon		0	235	846	2,208	564	179	96	34		4,162
Mongolia, South Korea, and North Korea		0	0	0	4	5	10	100	36		155
Saudi Arabia		0	177	0	4	0	5	0	0		186
Syria		0	2,678	1,870	0	0	0	1,664	23		6,235
Turkey		8,277	34,547	6,871	14,073	3,118	2,088	1,311	817		71,102
Uzbekistan, (Georgia (country)) Georgia, Azerbaijan, and the former Soviet Union (Asia) (Note: Before 1995, the aliyah from the Asian republics of the former Soviet Union were counted in the total of the aliyah from the (former) Russian Empire/Soviet Union.)								61,988 (Note: Specifically, 15973 from Uzbekistan and 7609 from Georgia during 1990–1999.)	12,422 (Note: Specifically, 8817 from Uzbekistan and 3766 from Georgia during 2000–2010.)		74,410
Yemen	2,600	15,838	48,315	1,170	1,066	51	17	683	103		69,843
Other (Asia)		13,125	947	0	60	21	45	205	30		14,433
Europe		377,487	332,802	106,305	162,070	183,419	70,898	888,603	96,165	162,320	2,380,069
Albania		0	0	5	8	0	0	376	0		389
Austria		7,748	2,632	610	1,021	595	356	368	150		13,480
Belgium		0	291	394	1,112	847	788	1,053	873		5,358
Bulgaria		7,057	37,260	1,680	794	118	180	3,999	341		51,429
Czechoslovakia→ (Czech Republic) Czechia and Slovakia		16,794	18,788	783	2,754	888	462	527	217		41,213
Denmark		0	27	46	298	292	411	389	85		1,548
Finland		0	9	20	172	184	222	212	33		852
France		1,637	3,050	1,662	8,050	5,399	7,538	11,986	13,062	38,000	90,384
(Weimar Republic) → (Nazi Germany) → Germany		52,951	8,210	1,386	3,175	2,080	1,759	2,442	866		72,869
Greece		8,767	2,131	676	514	326	147	127	48		12,736
Hungary		10,342	14,324	9,819	2,601	1,100	1,005	2,444	730		42,365
(Republic of Ireland) Ireland		0	14	46	145	157	233	136	54		785
Italy		1,554	1,305	414	940	713	510	656	389		6,481
Luxembourg		0	30	15	15	7	12	0	4		83
Netherlands		1,208	1,077	646	1,470	1,170	1,239	997	365		8,172
Norway		0	17	14	36	55	126	120	19		387
Poland		170,127	106,414	39,618	14,706	6,218	2,807	3,064	764		343,718
Portugal		0	16	22	66	56	55	47	28		290
Romania		41,105	117,950	32,462	86,184	18,418	14,607	6,254	711		317,691
Russian Empire→ Soviet Union→ Russia, Ukraine, and the former Soviet Union (Europe) (Note: Includes Asian parts of the Russian Empire and the Soviet Union until 1991 and Asian parts of modern Russia. Also includes Jews from the former Soviet Union whose republic of origin is unknown.)	47,500 (Note: This number is an average of two different estimates from page 93 of this book.)	52,350	8,163	13,743	29,376	137,134	29,754	844,139 (Note: Specifically, 114406 from Ukraine and 91756 from Russia during 1990–1999.)	72,520 (Note: Specifically, 50441 from Russia and 50061 from Ukraine during 2000–2010.)	118,000 (Note: Specifically, 45670 from Ukraine and 5530 from Belarus.)	1,352,679
Spain		0	80	169	406	327	321	269	178		1,750
Sweden		0	32	51	378	372	419	424	160		1,836
Switzerland		0	131	253	886	634	706	981	585		4,176
United Kingdom		1,574	1,907	1,448	6,461	6,171	7,098	5,365	3,725	6,320	40,069
(Socialist Federal Republic of Yugoslavia) Yugoslavia→ Serbia and the former Yugoslavia		1,944	7,661	320	322	126	140	2,029	162		12,704
Other (Europe)		2,329	1,281	3	173	32	0	198	93		4,109
Not known		52,982	20,014	3,307	2,265	392	469	422	0	0	79,851
Total	62,500 (Note: This number is an average of two different estimates.)	482,857	687,624	297,138	427,828	267,580	153,833	1,059,993	181,233	236,903	3,857,489

== See also ==
- Aliya la'regel - pilgrimage to Jerusalem
- Demographics of Israel
- Diaspora nationalism
- Galut
- Historical Jewish population comparisons
- History of the Jews in the Land of Israel
- Homeland for the Jewish people
- Illegal immigration from Africa to Israel
- Israeli identity card
- Israeli passport
- Jewish population by country
- Kibbutz volunteer
- Law of Return
- List of Jewish immigrants to the Land of Israel
- Olim L'Berlin
- Visa policy of Israel
- Yerida - emigration from Israel
