= Maimon =

Maimon is a Jewish surname, and may refer to:

- Ada Maimon (1893–1973), Israeli politician
- Alexander Ziskind Maimon (1809–1887), Jewish scholar
- David Maimon (1929–2010), Israeli army officer
- Frat Maimon (14th century), Jewish scholar
- Moses ben Maimon, known as Maimonides (1135–1204), rabbi, physician, and philosopher
- Moshe Maimon (1860–1924), Jewish Russian painter
- Salomon Maimon (1754–1800), German philosopher
- Shai Maimon (born 1986), Israeli footballer
- Shiri Maimon (born 1981), Israeli singer-songwriter, dancer and actress
- Yehuda Leib Maimon (1875–1962), Israeli rabbi and politician
- Yisrael Maimon (21st century), Israeli lawyer
- Maimon ben Joseph (12th century), rabbi and father of Maimonides

== See also ==
- Maimón
