= Nathanael ben Nehemiah Caspi =

Nathanael ben Nehemiah Caspi (fl. 1424) was a Provençal scholar. He lived at the end of the fourteenth century and at the beginning of the fifteenth. He was a disciple of Frat Maimon, under whose direction he composed in 1424 his first work, a commentary on the Cuzari of Judah ha-Levi. This commentary, still extant in manuscript (Bibliothèque Nationale, Paris, MS. No. 677, and elsewhere), is based upon the Hebrew translation of the Cuzari made by Judah ben Isaac Cardinal.

Caspi was also the author of the following works:

1. A commentary on the Ruach Chen, which treats of the terminology of Maimonides (ibid. No. 678, 3; Parma, No. 395);
2. A commentary on Maimonides' Shemoneh Peraqim (Paris, No. 678; Parma, No. 395); and
3. Liqqutot, a collection of glosses on the Pentateuch (Munich MS. No. 252). These glosses are based upon those of Joseph ben Nathan Official. Many rabbis of eastern France are cited in these glosses, and many French words and sentences may be found in them.
