= Yehuda Ha-Cohen Ibn Susan =

Religious life
- Religion: Judaism

Yehuda Ha-Cohen Ibn Susan (also known as Yehuda Ha-Cohen; Hebrew: יהודה הכהן אבן סוסאן; 12th century) was a rabbi and dayan in the city of Fez, Morocco. According to some sources he was the rabbi of Maimonides. He was martyred around 1165.

== Biography ==
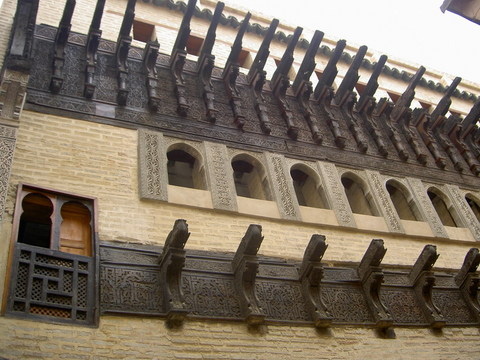
Maimonides' house in Fez

Yehuda HaCohen ibn Susan (Hebrew: יהודה הכהן אבן סוסאן) was a dayan or Jewish religious jurisprudent in Fez, Morocco, then controlled by the Almohad Caliphate, and was known for his genius in Torah wisdom and hasidut. His ancestors came to Fez from Babylon. Saadia Ibn Danan writes that after the death of Joseph ibn Migash in 1141, the yeshivot in al-Andalus dwindled, and Maimon the Dayan, the father of Maimonides, heard about the greatness of ibn Susan and traveled to him from Córdoba with his two sons: Musa (Maimonides), and his brother David, and they studied with him for a period not exceeding five years.

Around 1165 he was required by the Almohads to convert to Islam, and when he refused, was martyred. According to ibn Danan, this event was the reason for the Maimonides' departure from Morocco.

Rabbi Saadia's descriptions correspond to another source in a manuscript attributed to a descendant of Maimonides' generation and are accepted by most historians. Nevertheless, some scholars doubt this.
