= Judah ben Isaac Cardinal =

Translator

Judah ben Isaac Cardinal (or Cardineal) was a translator who lived at the end of the twelfth century and the beginning of the thirteenth, probably in Southern France.

At the request of Joseph ben Baruch, who, according to Leopold Zunz, traveled from France to Jerusalem by way of Egypt in 1211, Cardinal translated from Arabic into Hebrew Judah ha-Levi's Kuzari. This translation, which, with the exception of several small fragments, is no longer in existence, was used by Nathanael ben Nehemiah Kaspi in his commentary on the Kuzari entitled 'Edut le-Yisrael, and also by Judah ben Joseph Moscato in his commentary Qol Yehudah.
