= Maimon ben Joseph =

12th-century Spanish rabbinic judge

Rabbi Maimon ben Joseph ha-Dayyan
- מיימון בן יוסף הדיין
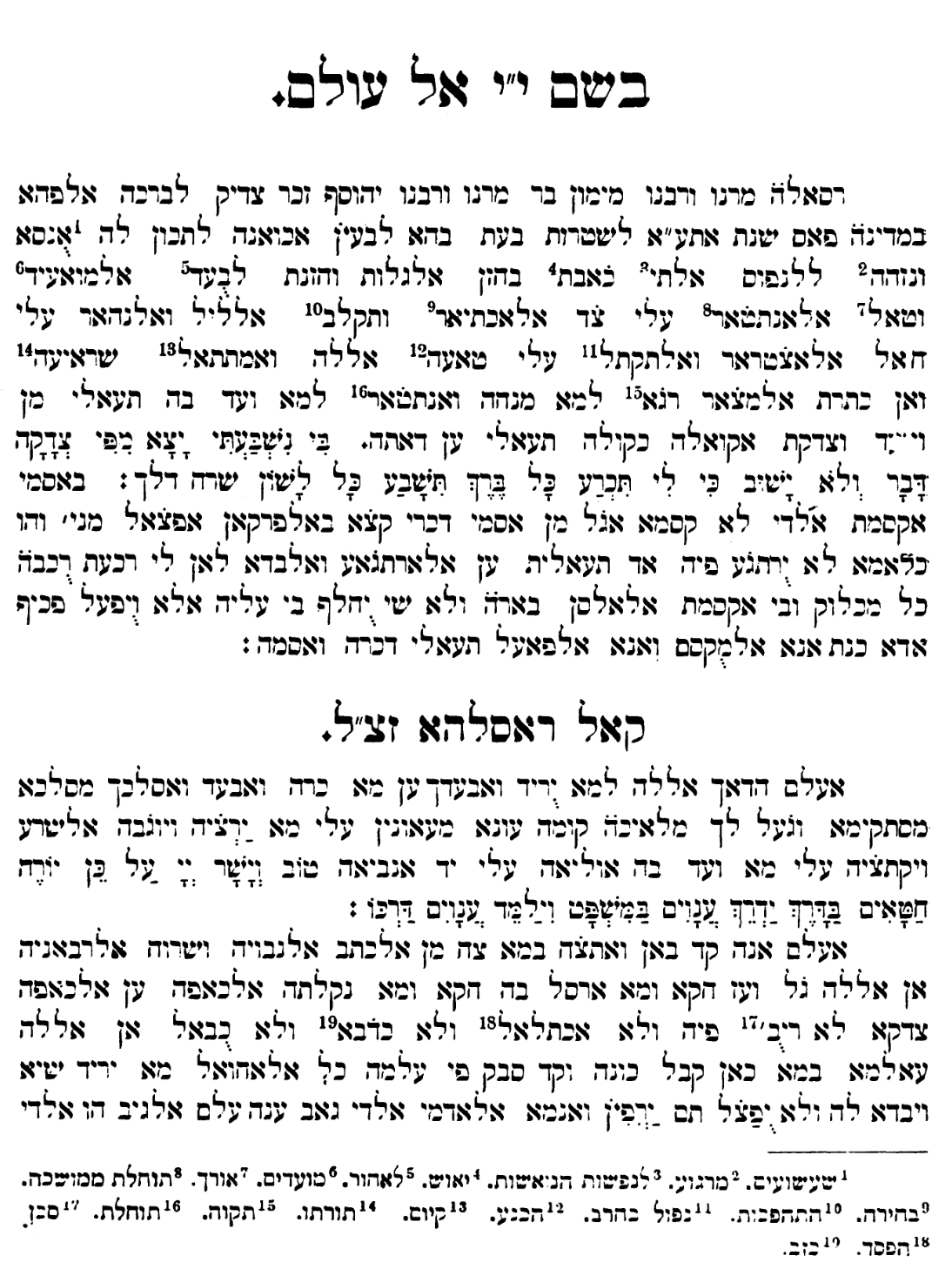
- Introduction of Maimon Ben Joseph's Epistle of Consolation to the Jews of Fes, in Arabic
- Born: c. 1110; Córdoba, al-Andalus
- Died: c. 1166
- Children: Maimonides
- Father: Joseph HaDayan

Rabbi Maimon ben Joseph HaDayan (מיימון בן יוסף הדיין; c. 1110 – c. 1165/1170) was an exegete, moralist and dayyan (judge) from al-Andalus. He is best known as the father of Maimonides. His teacher was the respected scholar Joseph ibn Migash. He authored a commentary, in Arabic, on the Pentateuch, and also wrote on Jewish ritual and festival law.

== Biography ==
Maimon was born in Córdoba, al-Andalus, into a distinguished Sephardic family of judges and communal leaders. His lineage, documented back to the beginning of the 10th century, includes seven generations of dayyanim: he was the son of Joseph the Sage, son of Isaac ha-Dayyan, son of Joseph, son of Obadiah, son of Solomon and son of Obadiah. Some traditions further trace the family roots to Rabbi Judah ha-Nasi and ultimately to King David.

He was a student of the prestigious scholar Joseph ha-Levi ibn Migash in Lucena, who was himself a disciple of Isaac Alfasi. This education immersed him in the Andalusian Jewish intellectual tradition, which sought to harmonize Rabbinic tradition with rational inquiry.

Following his studies, Maimon returned to Córdoba and was appointed as a dayyan (judge) of the local Jewish court, a position he held for many years. In this role, he served as both a legal arbiter for civil and religious disputes and a spiritual guide for the community during the relatively stable Almoravid era. He was also an astronomer, mathematician, and philosopher.

The relatively stable life of Córdoba's Jews was shattered in 1148 when the Almohad Caliphate conquered the city. The fanatical Almohads prohibited public non-Muslim worship and issued an ultimatum of conversion, exile, or death. It is believed that Maimon and his family remained in Córdoba for roughly a decade, living as crypto-Jews while outwardly posing as Muslims.

Around 1159 or 1160, the family moved to Fez, Morocco, where they hoped to find a safer environment for crypto-Jewish life. In 1165, following the public martyrdom of the communal leader Rabbi Judah ha-Kohen ibn Shoshan, the family fled North Africa by sea. They arrived in Acre in May 1165 and later visited holy sites in Jerusalem and Hebron.

Maimon died shortly thereafter, between 1165 and 1170. There are conflicting accounts regarding the location of his death; some sources suggest he died in Jerusalem, while others believe he reached Egypt with his sons and passed away there. A strong and widely accepted tradition places his grave in Tiberias, where he is said to be buried alongside his son.

== Works ==
Maimon authored several works, primarily in Judeo-Arabic, which reflect a focus on the peshat (plain meaning) of scripture and a moralistic religious orientation.

- Epistle of Consolation (Heb. Iggeret ha-Neḥama): Written in Judeo-Arabic around 1160 in Fez, this is Maimon's only complete extant work. The letter was a pastoral response to the despair of Jews living under Almohad rule. Maimon famously compared the exiled Jewish people to a man drowning in water that has reached his nostrils; the Torah and its commandments are the "lifeline" cast from heaven that the man must grasp even with his fingertips to survive. He argued that Islam, being strictly monotheistic, was not idolatry, and therefore Jews forced to convert could fulfill commandments in secret to avoid martyrdom. Much of the letter is a paean to the unique prophetic status of Moses, intended to refute Islamic claims that his prophecy had been superseded. The work concludes with an extensive commentary on Psalm 90 ("A Prayer of Moses"), which Maimon interpreted as a prophetic summary of Israel's history and future redemption.
- Commentaries on the Pentateuch, in Judeo-Arabic. While the full work is lost, fragments (particularly on Genesis and Exodus) were preserved in the writings of his grandson, Abraham ben Moses Maimonides.
- Halakhic Treatises: He wrote on ritual purity, the laws of prayer, and the festivals (dinim).
- Responsa: A small number of his Hebrew responsa have been preserved and published, covering topics such as Talmudic interpretation and Jewish law.
- Scientific Works: He is credited with an exposition of an Arabic astronomical book by al-Farghānī, though some scholars attribute this to a different "Maimon".

== Family and Legacy ==
Maimon's most significant legacy was the education and influence he provided to his son, Moses Maimonides. Maimonides frequently quoted his father’s teachings and used them as a foundation for his own halakhic works, such as the Mishneh Torah. Maimon also fathered a son named David, who became a merchant and supported the family before tragically drowning at sea.

The name "Maimon" became a symbol of intellectual and religious heritage; later figures such as the philosopher Solomon Maimon and the Zionist leader Rabbi Yehuda Leib Maimon adopted the surname to honor Maimonides' lineage.
