= Solomon ben Judah of Lunel =

Provençal philosopher

Solomon ben Judah of Lunel (born 1411) (Hebrew: שלמה בן יהודה) was a Provençal philosopher. His Provençal name was Solomon Vives. When he was only 13 years of age he composed, under the direction of his master, Frat Maimon, a commentary on the Cuzari of Judah ha-Levi. This commentary is extant in manuscript (A. Neubauer, Cat. Bodl. Hebr. MSS. No. 2383) under the title Ḥesheḳ Shelomoh. The young author displays in this work a considerable knowledge of the philosophical literature of his time. From a quotation made therein, it seems that Solomon wrote another commentary on the Ruaḥ Ḥen, which he wrongly attributes to Samuel ibn Tibbon.

== Jewish Encyclopedia bibliography ==
- Moritz Steinschneider, Hebr. Bibl. xvi.127;
- Ernest Renan, Les Ecrivains Juifs Français, p. 412;
- Henri Gross, Gallia Judaica, p. 290.
