= Jacob ben Chayyim Comprat Vidal Farissol =

Late Medieval Franco-Jewish scholar and poet

Jacob ben Chayyim Comprat Vidal Farissol (born c. 1405 - fl. 1422) was a French Jewish scholar of the early 15th century. Born in Avignon, he was a liturgical poet and the grandson of Vitalis Farissol, who had been a chief bailiff of Avignon in 1400. Farissol was a pupil of Solomon ben Menahem, or "Frat Maimon," under whose supervision he composed, at the age of seventeen, a commentary to Judah ha-Levi's "Cuzari" entitled "Bet Ya'aḳob," which was published in 1422. Farissol is also likely identical with the liturgical poet mentioned by Zunz ("Literaturgesch." p. 525) under the name of "Comprad Farissol," who flourished at Avignon in 1453. The name "Farissol" was a very common one among the Jews of Provence.
