= Joseph ibn Migash =

Andalusian rabbi and posek (1077 – c. 1141)

Joseph ben Meir HaLevi ibn Migash (also rendered Yosef ibn Meir Ha-Levi ibn Migash, José ben Meir ibn Megas, or simply Joseph ibn Migash; Hebrew: יוסף בן מאיר הלוי אבן מיגאש; early 1077 – c. 1141) was a prominent rabbi, halakhic decisor (posek), and head of the yeshiva (rosh yeshiva) in Lucena, in al-Andalus (modern-day Spain). He is also known by the acronym Ri Migash (ר״י מיגאש), standing for Rabbi Yosef Migash.

== Biography ==
Joseph ibn Migash was probably born in Seville, although Moritz Steinschneider believed he was born in Granada. He moved to Lucena, Córdoba at the age of 12 to study under the renowned talmudist Isaac Alfasi. He studied under Alfasi at Lucena for fourteen years. Shortly before his death in 1103, Alfasi granted semikha to ibn Migash, who was 26 years old. Passing over his own son, he also appointed him his successor as the rosh yeshiva (seminary head). Joseph ibn Migash held this position for 38 years.

Abraham ibn Daud, in the Sefer ha-Qabbalah, mentions his grandfather Joseph ibn Migash, who had the same name, as being a contemporary of Samuel ibn Naghrillah. He wrote that during the dispute between the supporters of Buluggin ibn Ziri and the supporters of Badis ibn Habus, the Zirid ruler of the Taifa of Granada, Joseph ibn Migash had sided with Buluggin in this dispute and fled to Askilia to avoid punishment.

It is clear that Migash was a great scholar: Maimonides in the introduction to his Commentary to Mishna, says "the Talmudic learning of this man amazes everyone who understands his words and the depth of his speculative spirit; so that it might almost be said of him that his equal has never existed." Judah ha-Levi eulogizes him in six poems which are full of his praise. Joseph ibn Migash's best-known student is probably Maymūn, Maimonides's father and teacher. In Maimonides' introduction to the Commentary on Mishnah, he heaps lavish praises upon Rabbi Joseph ibn Migash (Halevi)"

I have collected what I stumbled across from the glosses of my father, of blessed memory, as well as others under the name of our Rabbi Joseph Halevi, of blessed memory; and as the Lord lives, the understanding of that man in the Talmud is astounding, as anyone [can see] who observes his words and the depth of his comprehension, until I can say of him that 'there has never been any king like unto him before him (cf. 2 Kings 23:25) in his method [of elucidation]. I have also collected all of the legal matters (Heb. halachot) that I found that belonged to him in his commentaries, themselves.

There is a tradition that Maimonides himself was a pupil of Joseph ibn Migash. This probably arose from the frequent references in Maimonides' works to him as an authority. It is unlikely that he was literally taught by him, as Maimonides was 3 years old at the time of Joseph ibn Migash's death.

However, Maimonides' grandson published a pamphlet with his grandfather's approval, in which it is stated that Maimonides ran away from home in his youth, met Joseph ibn Migash, and studied under him for several years.

== Works ==
Joseph ibn Migash authored over 200 responsa, She'elot u-Teshuvot Ri Migash - originally in Judeo-Arabic - many of which are quoted in Bezalel Ashkenazi's Shittah Mekubetzet. Five of Ibn Migash's responsa survived in Yemen, and were published by Rabbi Yosef Qafih in 1973. He specified Chananel Ben Chushiel and Alfasi as his authorities, but disagreed with Alfasi in about thirty some odd places related to Halacha.

He also authored a Talmudic commentary - ḥiddushim (novellae) on tractates Baba Batra (link here) and Shevuot (included in Joseph Samuel Modiano's Uryan Telitai, Salonica 1795) - which is quoted by various Rishonim. His other works have been lost.

== Connections ==
רי״ף
אבן מיגאש
מיימון אב הרמב״ם

Teachers
Students
