= Frat Maimon =

French Jewish Provençal scholar (fl. 14th century)

Frat Maimon (also known as Prat Maimon or Solomon ben Menaham; fl. 1411) was a French Jewish Provençal scholar. A liturgical poet, he flourished in the second half of the 14th century. The name "Frat" is, according to Neubauer, abbreviated from "Frater."

Frat Maimon was the author of four works, which are known only by quotations made from them by three of his disciples: (1) Edut le-Yisrael (A Testimony to Israel), probably a controversial treatise on religion; (2) Netzer Mattai, on the philosophical explanations of the haggadot found in the Talmud; (3) a commentary on the poem "Batte ha-Nefesh" of Levi ben Abraham; (4) comments on Genesis.

His students included Nathanael ben Nehemiah Caspi, Jacob ben Chayyim Comprat Vidal Farissol, and Solomon ben Judah of Lunel.
