= Naftali Hertz Halevi =

Polish-Israeli rabbi (1852–1902)

Rabbi Naftali Hertz Halevi Widenbaum
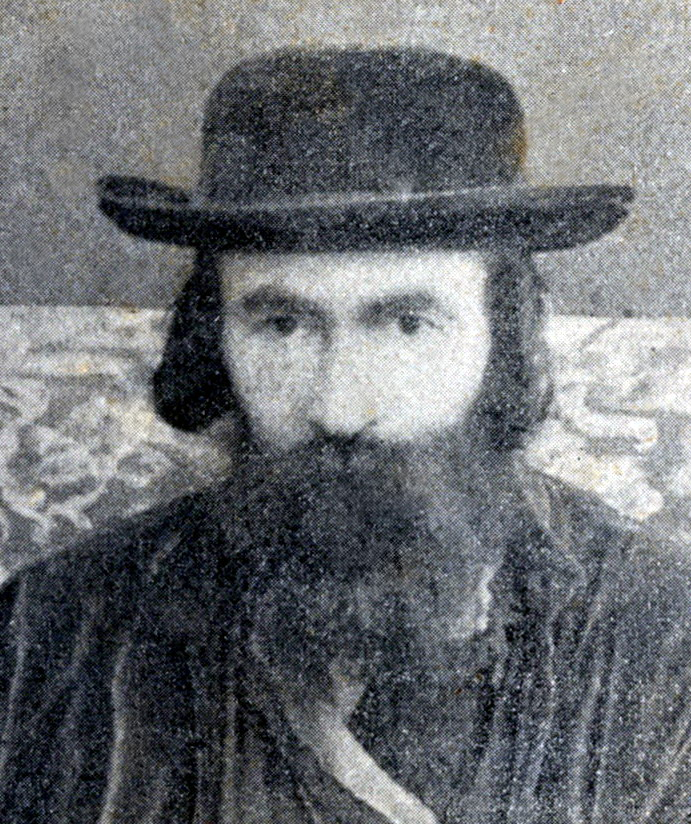
- Title: Rabbi

Personal life
- Born: 26 October 1852 Białystok
- Died: 19 June 1902 (aged 49)
- Buried: Mount of Olives Jewish Cemetery

Religious life
- Religion: Judaism
- Residence: Jaffa

Rabbi Naftali Hertz Halevi Widenbaum (26 October 1852 – 19 June 1902) was the first Ashkenazi rabbi in Jaffa and the Moshava.

== Biography ==
He was born in Białystok to Rabbi Elijah Leib. In the year 1884 he immigrated to Israel. He lived in the Mea Shearim neighborhood in Jerusalem.

In 1886, he founded the Ashkenazi congergation in Jaffa, and was sent to serve as rabbi there by Rabbi Shmuel Salant and Rabbi Joshua Leib Diskin of Jerusalem. While there, he also established a local yeshiva and hospital.

In April 1891, Halevi was chosen to lead the united congergation of the Sephardic and Ashkenazi communities of Jaffa and the Moshava after the two congergations united, essentially becoming the highest rabbinical authority there. Halevi served as rabbi of Jaffa and the Moshava until his death in 1902.

== Writings ==
Halevi is primarily known for his kabbalistic works and commentaries; he wrote a commentary on part of the book Mishnas Chassidim, and a commentary on Bris Olam called Luchot Habrit.

=== Siddur ===
Halevi was known for his siddur, which in Shacharit included instructions for kabbalistic kavanot (intentions) during prayer. It was reprinted in 1972.
