= Menachem Mendel of Peremyshlany =

Hasidic Jewish leader (b. 1728)

- מנחם מנדל מפרמישלאן
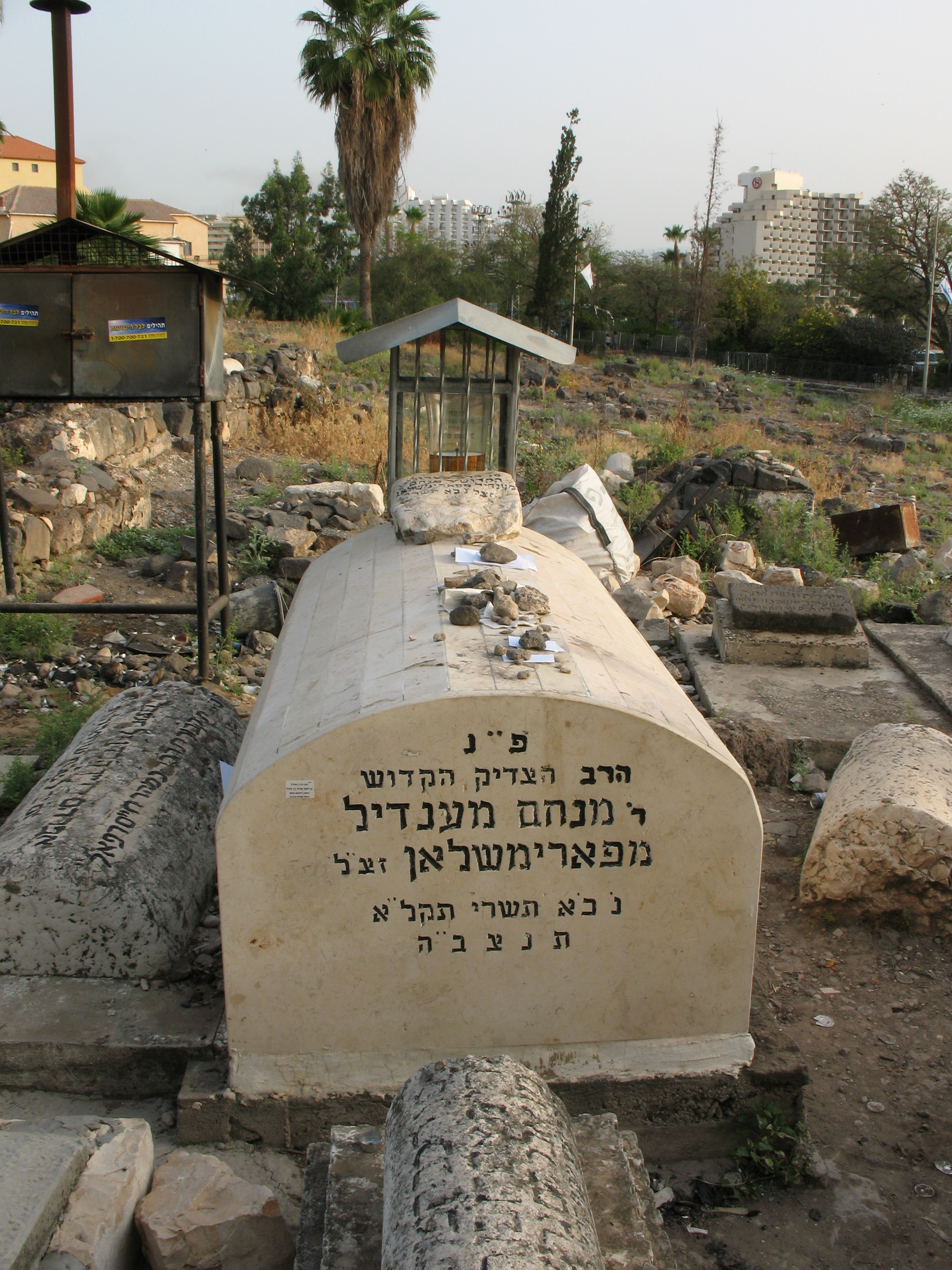

Personal life
- Born: 1728 Peremyshliany, Polish-Lithuanian Commonwealth
- Died: c. 1770 Tiberias

Religious life
- Denomination: Hasidic Judaism

Menachem Mendel of Peremyshlany (born 1728) was an early Hasidic Jewish leader and a prominent figure in the 18th-century Hasidic aliyah movement to the Land of Israel. He is best known for his 1764 migration to Tiberias and for co-founding the city's first Ashkenazi synagogue.

== Biography ==
Before his emigration to the Land of Israel, Menahem Mendel was active in Eastern Europe. Prior to his departure, he visited Cekinowka and Soroki—townlets located on both banks of the Dniester river—to assist in the freeing of Jewish captives.

In 1764, Menachem Mendel immigrated to the Land of Israel alongside Nachman of Horodenka, leading a small group of disciples of the Baal Shem Tov. The group settled in the city of Tiberias. Four years later, in 1768, he and his companions established the first Ashkenazi synagogue on the shores of the Sea of Galilee.

== Ideology and teachings ==
Menachem Mendel represented the radical, enthusiastic wing of early Hasidism, prioritizing pure devotion to God over traditional religious mechanics. He controversially argued that excessive Torah study hindered spiritual connection, advocating instead for social seclusion and restrained, quiet prayer. He taught: "If we divert our thoughts from devotion to God, and study excessively, we will forget the fear of Heaven … study should therefore be reduced and one should always meditate on the greatness of the Creator."

Furthermore, he strongly opposed perfectionism and religious melancholy; he taught that obsessing over every action was the work of the "evil inclination" and that followers should avoid despair even after sinning. He wrote: "One should not be exceedingly meticulous in every act performed, because this is the intent of the evil inclination; even if, Heaven forbid, one has sinned – one should not be overtaken by melancholy."

His primary teachings were published posthumously in works including Likkutei Yekarim (Lvov, 1792) and Darkhei Yesharim (Zhitomir, 1805).
