= Joseph ben Baruch =

French rabbi

Joseph ben Baruch was a French rabbi, a tosafist of the twelfth and thirteenth centuries. Gross identifies him with Joseph of Clisson. Joseph resided for some time in Paris, where he associated with Judah Sir Leon and instructed Samuel of Falaise in special subjects.

In 1211 he emigrated with his brother Meïr to Palestine by way of Egypt. It was probably Joseph who took to England the Hebrew translation of the Kuzari which had been made by Judah Cardinal. Judah al-Ḥarizi met Joseph and his brother as heads of the new congregation of Jerusalem ("Taḥkemoni," xlvi.). Joseph is cited in the Tosafot as "Joseph of Jerusalem" (Pes. 15a), "Joseph, inhabitant of Jerusalem" (Meg. 4a), and "R. Joseph of Palestine" (Ḳid. 34a). Explanations of his are quoted by Bezaleel Ashkenazi in his "Shiṭṭah Meḳubbeẓet," and in various commentaries on the Pentateuch. To Joseph of Clisson are attributed consultations ("Maimoniyyot", No. 31) and divers ritual decisions (Mordecai on Ḥul. iii., No. 635; idem on Giṭ. iv., No. 465). Joseph was also the author of liturgical poems; a confession of sins for the Day of Atonement written by him, has been preserved in the ritual.

He is referred to as "Joseph" in a manuscript tosafist commentary to the Pentateuch belonging to E. N. Adler; but in the parallel passages in "Minḥat Yehudah," 21b, "Da'at Zeḳenim," 20b, and "Hadar Zeḳenim," 18a, he is cited as "the man of Jerusalem." Berliner ("Zeit. für Hebr. Bibl." iv. 148) identified him with Joseph ben Johanan the Jerusalemite (see Gross in "Monatsschrift," xlv. 370).
