= Nachman of Horodenka =

Hasidic rabbi (approximately 1680-1765)

Rabbi Nachman of Horodenka
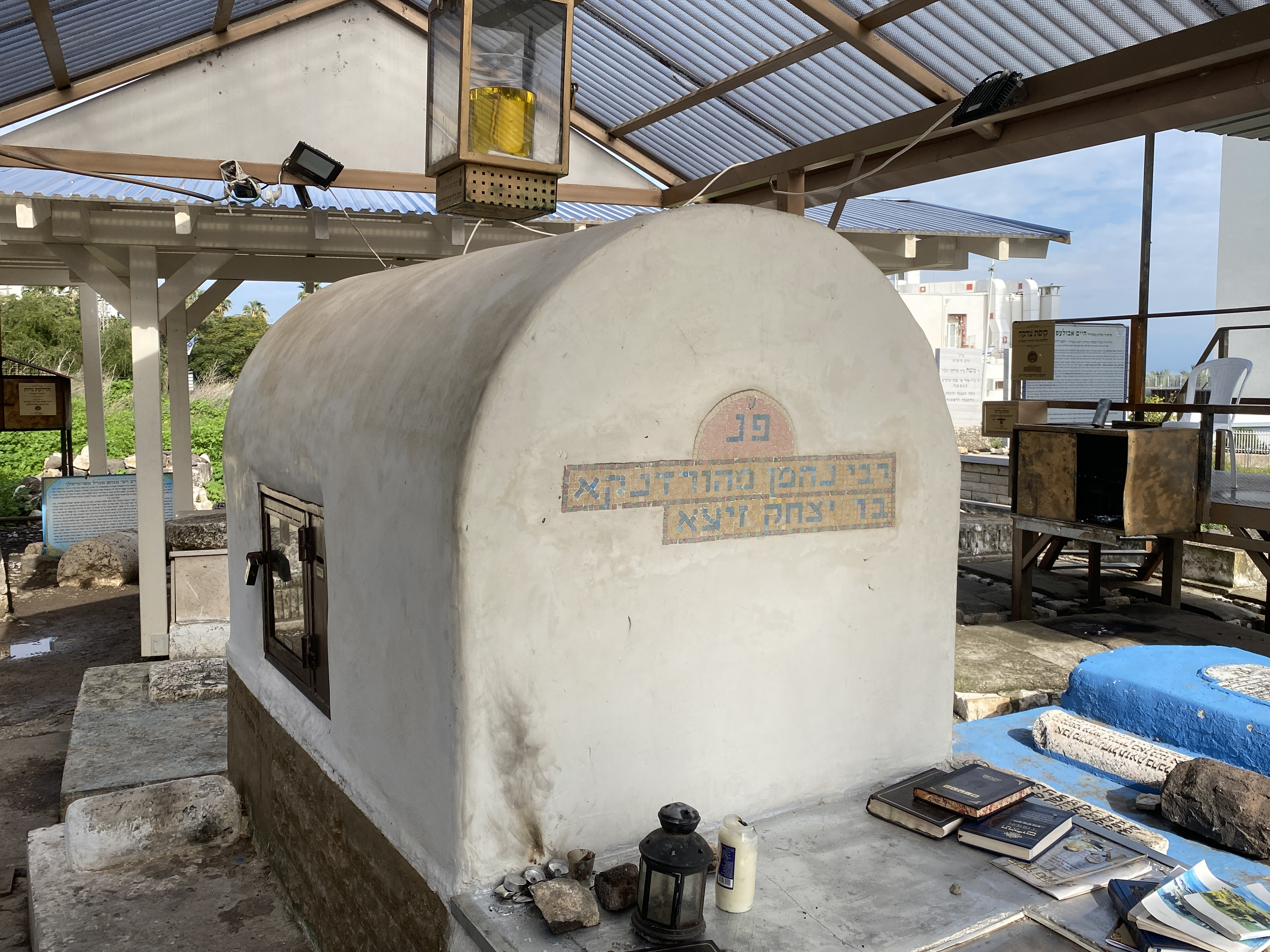
- Tomb of Rabbi Nachman of Horodenka in the ancient Jewish cemetery of Tiberias

Personal life
- Born: c. 1680 Zhovkva, Polish-Lithuanian Commonwealth
- Died: June 21, 1765 (2 Tammuz 5525) Tiberias, Ottoman Syria
- Known for: Early Hasidic leader, close disciple of the Baal Shem Tov

Religious life
- Religion: Judaism

Rabbi Nachman of Horodenka (נחמן מהורדנקא; approximately 1680-1765) was a Hasidic leader.

At first, Rabbi Nachman was among the Talmidei Chachamim who gathered to study Torah in Brody. After experiencing a dream which he interpreted as a signal for him to go to the Baal Shem Tov, Rabbi Nachman became a close disciple and one of the first supporters of the Baal Shem Tov.

After marrying off his son to the granddaughter of the Baal Shem Tov, he moved to the Land of Israel along with Menachem of Premishlan and others, arriving at the port of Haifa in 1764. At first he lived in Safed, and afterward he settled in Tiberias. He died in Tiberias on June 21, 1765, and was buried in Tiberias Ancient Jewish Cemetery.

Rabbi Nachman was a seventh-generation lineal descendant of Rabbi Judah Loew ben Bezalel. Rabbi Nachman's grandson was Rabbi Nachman of Breslov.
