= Judah ben Kalonymus ben Moses =

Jewish German scholar, died 1200

Judah ben Kalonymus ben Moses of Mainz (died 1200) was a Jewish German scholar, halakhic authority, and kabbalist. In his early years, he studied in Speyer under Shemariah ben Mordecai who taught him mysticism. During the Third Crusade, Judah helped his community to prepare for the antisemitic attacks to follow. Among his pupils were his son Eleazar of Worms, Joel ben Isaac ha-Levi and Baruch ben Samuel.
