= Baruch ben Samuel =

German payytan (c. 1150–1221)

Baruch ben Samuel (died April 25, 1221), also called Baruch of Mainz to distinguish him from Baruch ben Isaac, was a Talmudist and prolific payyeṭan, who flourished in Mainz at the beginning of the thirteenth century.

== Writings ==
He was a pupil of Moses ben Solomon ha-Kohen of Mainz, Eliezer ben Samuel of Metz and Judah ben Kalonymus; the judicial sentences of all he frequently cites. Baruch was one of the most eminent German rabbis of his time, and one of the leading signatories of the Takkanot Shum. Several of his responsa have been preserved in the German collections; most of them refer to the rabbinic civil law. His Sefer ha-Ḥokmah (Book of Wisdom), still extant in the time of Bezalel ben Abraham Ashkenazi, but now lost, appears also to have been largely legal in character. Early writers cite also a commentary by Baruch on the treatise Nedarim, which was lost at an early date.

Of Baruch's poetical activity more is known. His penitential poems and dirges, as well as his hymns for the Sabbath and for weddings, which made him one of the most popular of the payyeṭanim, were incorporated into the German and the Polish rituals. Baruch displays a great command of language; the seliḥot, in particular, being frequently characterized by genuine poetic fervor. The following is a specimen of these poems, translated into English from a German version by Zunz:

"Jeshurun's God, beyond compare, Enthroned above the clouds, Who dwelleth in the heavens high, Yet still on earth is ever nigh; Mid tears and sadness, songs and gladness, To Him my gaze I turn, Who all my feeling, thought, and action, Is ever sure to learn."

== Children ==
Rabbi Samuel ben Baruch of Bamberg studied under his father and Eliezer b. Samuel of Metz who also became a tosafist.

== Similar names ==
Baruch, the subject of this article, should not be confounded with Baruch of Greece, a Tosafist quoted several times in the Tosafot and in Mordecai (compare List of Tosafists).

== Jewish Encyclopedia bibliography ==
- Azulai, Shem ha-Gedolim, ed. Wilna, i. 38;
- Kohn, Mordecai ben Hillel, p. 102;
- Heimann, Michael Joseph (1891). Or ha-Ḥayyim. Frankfort-on-the-Main. No. 637;
- Grätz (who, without good reason, considered the payyeṭan Baruch, who died in 1221, as not identical with Baruch, author of Sefer ha-Ḥokmah, who, according to Grätz, was still living in 1223), Gesch. der Juden, vii. 21;
- Zunz, S. P. pp. 268–270 (contains a translation of two pieces);
  - idem, Literaturgesch. pp. 306–309;
  - idem, Z. G. pp. 54, 55, 59, 193;
  - idem, Monatstage, xxii.;
- Landshuth, Ammude ha'Abodah, p. 55.L. G.

== See also ==
- Baruch El Elyon
- Ani hu ha-sho'el
