= Ani hu ha-sho'el =

Ani hu ha-sho'el (Hebrew: אני הוא השואל, literally 'I am the one who asks') is a Selicha piyyut for Yom Kippur; in most rites, but not all, it is (or was) recited in the Musaf service. It is composed by Rabbi Baruch ben Samuel of Mainz. As is common in Selichot for Musaf, the Selicha describes the Yom Kippur service in the Temple and the loss since the destruction of the Temple. In many communities, it is recited aloud by the Hazzan with a moving melody. Usually, even in communities where it is customary to recite the Selichot on a multi-year cycle and to choose only some of the Selichot each year, this Selicha is recited each year.

The selicha is included in the liturgy of most of the printed Western Ashkenazic Selichot rites. Like most piyyutim of 12th century poets from Western Europe, the Selicha is not recited in most Eastern Ashkenazic rites, although it is recited in the Bohemian rite (which is also the rite of East Germany), and in the rite of the Old Synagogue in Prague.

== Editions of the piyyut ==
The Selicha has been printed twice in critical editions. Once in Avraham Meir Habermann's edition of the piyyutim of Rabbi Baruch of Mainz, and a second time in Daniel Goldschmidt's edition of the Yom Kippur Machzor.

It has also been translated once to English.

== Structure of the poem ==
The poem includes an alphabetic acrostic, and at the end, it is signed Baruch bar Shmuel Hazak (Baruch son of Samuel the Strong). It is structured in stanzas of two lines (four hemistichs), in the Yated meter and four vowels, and a closing hemistich of yated and five vowels.
