= Rabbi Samuel of Bamberg =

Rabbi Samuel of Bamberg, or Rabbi Samuel ben Baruch of Bamberg, of Bamberg was a rabbi based in Bamberg, Germany circa 1220, in the Ashkenaz area.

Samuel was born in Metz, but lived in Bamberg, after which he came to be called. He studied under his father, Baruch ben Samuel of Mainz, and Eliezer ben Samuel of Metz. He is the teacher of Israel of Bamberg who succeeded him in his position.

== Teachings ==
A tosafist, little of his biography is known beyond his name and teachings that come in his name. Rabbi Joseph Karo's Beyt Yosef (בית יוסף) refers to Mordechai ben Hillel's teaching (perhaps an etiology) that when Tish'ah Be'Av fell (or was postponed from Friday night to Saturday night) from a Saturday night to a Sunday night, "הר"ש מבונבור"ק" ("The Rabbi S. of Bonbork"—presumably a nasalized pronunciation with a softened "g" and slightly altered pronunciation of the vowels—yielding one "Rabbi S. of Bamberg") one would say "Creator of the lights of fire", but one does not make a blessing on the fragrances. On the night after Tisha Be-Av one makes "havdallah" on a cup [of wine] and does not make a blessing, neither on the flame nor on the fragrances." (Joseph Karo, Beyt Yosef on Orach Chayyim 556:1).
