= Israel of Bamberg =

German rabbi

Israel of Bamberg was a 13th-century Germany Tosafist who served as Chief Rabbi of Bamberg, Germany after succeeding his teacher Rabbi Samuel of Bamberg. Israel's tosafot are quoted by Mordecai ben Hillel who mentions Israel's tosafot on the Talmudic tractates of Shabbat and Avodah Zarah, which though no longer extant, are quoted by a 15th-century Italian codifier (Ms. Adler 2717, folio 308). In his tosafot, Israel relies primarily on his teacher.
