= Shemariah ben Mordecai =

German rabbi and Tosafist

Shemariah ben Mordecai was a German rabbi and tosafist of the first half of the 12th century, who was a pupil of the tosafist Isaac ben Asher. He was considered an especially eminent authority on religious rites (ba'al ma'asim), and seems to have written posḳim (decisions); no less a person than Jacob b. Meïr Tam consulted him about difficult question (Or Zarua' on B. B. 199).

Those of Shemariah's pupils most deserving mention are Judah b. Kalonymus b. Meïr, author of Yiḥuse Tannaim va-Amoraim, and Judah ben Kalonymus, father of Eleazar of Worms. The former usually calls him mori ha-yashish (my aged teacher), which seems to indicate that Shemariah died at an advanced age. It is, however, not true that Eleazar of Worms also was his pupil, as has been asserted by some.

== Jewish Encyclopedia bibliography ==
- Epstein, Das Talmudische Lexicon, in Monatsschrift, xxxix. 453-454 (also printed separately);
- Kohn, Mardochai b. Hillel, p. 15
