= Jewish mysticism =

Different forms of mysticism in Jewish history

Academic study of Jewish mysticism, especially since Gershom Scholem's Major Trends in Jewish Mysticism (1941), draws distinctions between different forms of mysticism which were practiced in different eras of Jewish history. Of these, Kabbalah, which emerged in 12th-century southwestern Europe, is the most well known, but it is not the only typological form, nor was it the first form which emerged. Among the previous forms were Merkabah mysticism (c. 100 BCE – 1000 CE), and Ashkenazi Hasidim (early 13th century) around the time of the emergence of Kabbalah.

Kabbalah means "received tradition", a term which was previously used in other Judaic contexts, but the Medieval Kabbalists adopted it as a term for their own doctrine in order to express the belief that they were not innovating, but were merely revealing the ancient hidden esoteric tradition of the Torah. This issue has been crystalized until today by alternative views on the origin of the Zohar, the main text of Kabbalah, attributed to the circle of its central protagonist Rabbi Shimon bar Yochai in the 2nd century CE, for opening up the study of Jewish mysticism. Traditional Kabbalists regard it as originating in tannaitic times (c. 10 – c. 220 CE), redacting the Oral Torah, so do not make a sharp distinction between Kabbalah and early Rabbinic Jewish mysticism. Academic scholars regard it as a synthesis from the Middle Ages, when it appeared between the 13th and 15th centuries, but assimilating and incorporating into itself earlier forms of Jewish mysticism, possible continuations of ancient esoteric traditions, (Note: In Major Trends in Jewish Mysticism (1941), Gershom Scholem rejected the possibility of original ancient source texts for the Zohar. In Kabbalah: New Perspectives (1990), Moshe Idel reassessed this, seeing implicit continuity between options in ancient Jewish mystical ideas (including orthodox Rabbinic and heterodox Jewish Gnostic), and the medieval emergence of Kabbalah.) as well as medieval philosophical elements.

The theosophical dimension of Kabbalah unfolded through several historical phases identified in the scholarly literature:

- Early medieval Kabbalah (c. 1175–13th century): Originating in Provence and Catalonia, this stage introduced sephirotic theosophy and texts like Sefer ha‑Bahir, laying the groundwork for later symbolic systems.
- Classical/Zoharic Kabbalah (c. 1175–1492): Emerging in medieval Iberia and lasting through the expulsion of the Jews from Spain, this phase centered on the Zohar and related texts, developing symbolic myth and esoteric hermeneutics.
- Cordoveran Kabbalah (c. 1492–1570): In Safed, Rabbi Moshe Cordovero systematized earlier traditions in Pardes Rimonim, presenting a rational, philosophical structure of emanation. This stage bridged medieval symbolism and the mythic cosmology that followed.
- Lurianic Kabbalah (c. 1569–present): Rabbi Isaac Luria introduced doctrines of tzimtzum, shevirat ha-kelim, and tikkun, assimilating medieval and Cordoverean systems into a mythic framework that became the foundation of modern Jewish mysticism. Contemporary Lurianic Kabbalah also has esoteric components.

After Luria, two new mystical currents popularized Kabbalah within Judaism:

- Sabbatean movements (1666–18th century): Antinomian and heretical in character, these movements drew heavily on Lurianic motifs, culminating in the messianic claims of Shabbetai Tzvi.
- Hasidic Judaism (1734–present): Emerging among Eastern European Jewry, Hasidism integrated Lurianic cosmology into devotional practice, emphasizing joy, prayer, and mystical union. Neo-Hasidism (19th century–present)—which incorporates neo-Kabbalah—is a descendant of Hasidism that is popular within Jewish religious movements outside Orthodox Judaism.

Two non-Jewish syncretic religious traditions also popularized Judaic Kabbalah through their incorporation as part of general Western esotericism from the Renaissance onwards: the theological Christian Cabala (c. 15th–18th centuries), which adapted Judaic Kabbalistic doctrine to Christian belief, and its occultist offshoot, the Hermetic Qabalah (c. 19th century–present), which became a main element in esoteric and magical societies and teachings.

== Historical forms ==
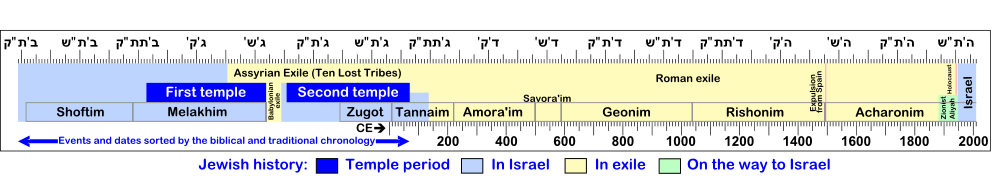

Historical phase	Dates	Influential developments and texts
Early Israelite traditional origins	2nd millennium–800 BCE	Prophetic meditation mystical elements in traditional prehistory and early Bible depiction encounters with the divine: Hebrew Patriarchs and Matriarchs; Covenant of the pieces Jacob's Ladder; Jacob wrestling with the angel Moses; Burning bush Theophany at Sinai; Yahwism Early Israelite monarchic and cult prophets: Elijah's ascension
Prophetic Judaism	800–5th century BCE	Prophetic meditation, divine encounter, heavenly host throne of God visions, mystical elements, in the literary Prophetic books of the Bible, from the Kingdoms of Israel and Judah to the Babylonian captivity and Return to Zion: Isaiah; Ezekiel; Zechariah
Apocalyptic Judaism	Beginning 5th century BCE; 300–100 BCE; Continuing to 1st century CE	Mystical and apocalyptic speculation, heavenly angelology and eschatology, in Second Temple Judaism under foreign rule and oppression, after the social institution era of prophecy closed: Daniel; 1 Enoch; Biblical apocrypha-pseudepigrapha
Mystical elements in Second Temple period sects	c. 200 BCE–c. 100 CE	Mystical, esoteric and pious elements among the diverse Jewish sects, in the religious syncretism of late Second Temple period Judea and the Diaspora: Second Temple Judaism; Hasideans; Essenes; Therapeutae; Hellenistic Judaism; Jewish Gnosticism; Philo's Platonic philosophy influence on early Christianity; Christian Jewish early Christian mysticism
Early Rabbinic mysticism and mystical elements in classic Rabbinic literature	c. 1–200 CE influence to 5th century CE	References in exoteric Talmud and Midrash to Tannaic early Rabbinic mystical circles, Maaseh Merkabah – Work of the Chariot exegesis and ascent, Maaseh Bereshit – Work of Creation exegesis. Wider continuing mystical elements in aggadah Rabbinic theology and narratives: Yohanan ben Zakkai and his disciples Rabbi Akiva (Simeon bar Yochai traditional/pseudepigraphical attribution of later Kabbalist Zohar) Mystical aggadot examples: Four who entered the Pardes; Oven of Akhnai and the Voice of God; Torah: black fire on white fire, God looked in Torah to create World; Shekhinah accompanies Israel in exile The Messiah at the Gates of Rome
Merkabah-Hekhalot esoteric texts and methods	c. 2nd century–1000	Traditional/pseudepigraphical/anonymous esoteric Merkabah mysticism Throne and Hekhalot Palaces ascent literature and methods. Text protagonists are early Tannaic Rabbis, though texts academically dated variously from Talmudic 100–500 to Gaonic 400–800 periods, and sectarian/rabbinic origins debated: Earlier texts: 3 Enoch; Hekhalot Rabbati (The Greater Palaces); Hekhalot Zutari (The Lesser Palaces); Merkavah Rabbah (The Great Chariot); Later texts: Shi'ur Qomah (Divine Dimensions) Mystical speculations of the Geonim
Influence of Post-Biblical Jewish mythology and folklore on mysticism	c. early CE-early modernity	Jewish mysticism, from early Hekhalot texts, through medieval spirituality, to the folk religion storytelling of East European shtetls, absorbed motifs of Jewish mythology and folklore through Aggadic creative imagination, reception of earlier Jewish apocrypha traditions, and absorption of outside cultural influences. Later Midrash and smaller Midrashim evolve towards the ethos of Kabbalistic mysticism: Lilith; Theli; Estries; Ziz; Kefitzat haderech Evil eye Dybbuk; Superstition in Judaism
"Practical Kabbalah" white magic	c. early CE – early modernity	Elite Jewish use of white magic (direct spiritual practices to influence the material realm, or to gain spiritual ascent) by mystics, colloquially called "Practical Kabbalah", drawing from syncretically collected traditions of the Talmudic period to early modernity. Distinguished from Kabbalistic theurgy (influencing solely the supernal realm of inter-divine attributes), from natural magic interpretations of Kabbalah, and from popular folk magic: Magical elements in Merkabah mysticism Hekhalot literature ascents Use of Sefer Yetzirah for magic Sefer Raziel HaMalakh; Golem; Amulets; Joseph della Reina 1400s attempt to hasten the messiah 16th–19th century European Baal Shem
Proto-Kabbalistic	200–600	Maaseh Bereshit – Creation speculation text. Describes 10 sephirot, though without their significance to later Kabbalah. Received rationalist interpretations before becoming a source text for Kabbalah: Sefer Yetzirah (Book of Formation)
Mystical elements in Medieval Jewish philosophy and culture	11th–13th centuries	Mystical elements in the thought of Medieval rationalist and anti-rationalist Jewish philosophical theologians: Solomon ibn Gabirol Jewish Neoplatonism; Isaac Israeli ben Solomon Jewish Neoplatonism; Abraham ibn Ezra Jewish Neoplatonism; Judah Halevi anti-rationalism Moses Maimonides Neoplatonised Aristotelianism Mystical elements in the efflorescence of poetry in Moorish Spanish Jewish culture and Christian Spain
Jewish Sufi piety	11th to 15th centuries	Jewish mystical piety, influenced by Islamic Sufism, systemising meditative experiential practices: Bahya ibn Paquda 11th century – Chovot HaLevavot (Duties of the Heart); Abraham Maimonides and the "Jewish Sufis" of Old Cairo 13th–15th century
Early Kabbalah	c. 1174–1200	Emergence of mystical-mythic theosophical-theurgic Kabbalah among the Hachmei Provence in Southern France (Occitania). The Bahir, regarded in academia as the first Kabbalistic work, incorporates an earlier source text: Sefer HaBahir (Book of Brightness); Abraham ben David of Posquières (The Raavad) critic of Maimonides; Isaac the Blind "Iyyun" and "Unique Cherub" mystical circles of unknown provenance
Chassidei Ashkenaz	c. 1150–1250	Mystical-ethical piety and speculative theological theory in Ashkenaz-Germany. Shaped by Merkabah-Hekhalot texts, Practical Kabbalah magical elements, mystical reinterpretation of early medieval Jewish philosophy, Rhineland Crusader persecutions and German monastic values. Established a supreme value for devotional selflessness in Judaism: Samuel of Speyer; Judah of Regensburg – Sefer Hasidim (Book of the Pious); Eleazar of Worms
Medieval Kabbalah development	c. 1200–1492	Alternative philosophical vs. mythological interpretations of Theosophical Kabbalah: "Neoplatonic" quasi-philosophical hierarchy, and Jewish-"Gnostic" mythological interest in sexual theurgic and demonic dualism motifs. Centred in Spain's Kabbalistic golden age: Early 13th century Girona neoplatonic school: Azriel of Gerona; Nahmanides (Ramban) – Torah commentary 13th century Castile gnostic school: Treatise on the Left Emanation The Zohar in Spain from c.1286: Zohar literature (Book of Splendour) late 1200s–1400s. Castile's gnostic culmination. Canonised as Kabbalah's central poetic visionary scripture. Later strata (Ra'aya Meheimna, Idrot) are most esoteric and anthropomorphic. Subsequent Zohar exegesis dominated other Kabbalah traditions. Possible Kabbalists in Zohar circle: Moses de León; Todros ben Joseph Abulafia and others Kabbalistic scholarship: Joseph Gikatilla – Shaarei Orah (Gates of Light) c.1290 Spain; Sefer HaTemunah (Book of the Figure) 13th–14th century influential doctrine in Kabbalah of Cosmic Cycles, later rejected by Cordovero and Luria; Bahya ben Asher Torah commentary
Medieval Ecstatic Kabbalah	13th–16th centuries	Medieval Meditative Kabbalah developed its own traditions. Abraham Abulafia's Ecstatic-Prophetic Kabbalah, his Maimonidean alternative competitor to Theosophical Kabbalah, embodies the non-Zoharic ecstatic stream in Spanish Kabbalism. Re-imagining Judaism's prophetic techniques, it remained marginal to mainstream Kabbalah, but established a following in east Mediterranean: Abulafian Prophetic Kabbalah school: Abraham Abulafia Mediterranean area late 13th century Judah Albotini Jerusalem 15th–16th century Other meditative methods: Isaac of Acco 14th century Joseph Tzayach Damascus and Jerusalem 16th century
Renaissance era Kabbalah influences	c. 1450s-1600s	Influence of the European Renaissance in crystalising philosophical and magical interpretations of Judaic Kabbalah, and fusions of philosophy with Kabbalah in late medieval-early modern Jewish philosophy: Italian Jews' historical openness to general culture Florence centre of Renaissance humanism Perennial philosophy influences on Jewish philosophy Yohanan Alemanno culmination of Natural magic interpretations of Kabbalah, interpreting Judaism drawing down Divine influx to the material world. Influence on 16th century systemisations of Kabbalah, and later Hasidism; Influence on Pico della Mirandola, Christian Cabala and Western esotericism Platonist influenced fusions of Kabbalah with Jewish philosophy: Abraham Cohen de Herrera early 1600s Other mystical elements in early modern Jewish philosophy: Judah Leon Abravanel (Leone Ebreo) Portuguese-Italian early 1500s "Dialogues of Love" Platonism
Post-1492 and Safed Kabbalah	16th century	Transition from esoteric Medieval Kabbalism to Kabbalah as a national messianic doctrine, after 1492 Expulsion from Spain exile. Judaic renaissance of Palestine: Joseph Taitazak Salonica; Solomon Molcho Jewish Messiah claimant Meir ibn Gabbai 16th century early systemiser The 2 definitive systemisations of Kabbalah, in latter 1500s Safed-Galilee: 1 Quasi-Rational: Moses Cordovero (Ramak) – Pardes Rimonim. Cordoverian systemisation of Medieval Kabbalah until 1570; 2 Supra-Rational: Isaac Luria (the Ari) – new post-Medieval Lurianic systemisation taught 1570–1572 Other Kabbalists of the Safed mystical and scholarly renaissance: Joseph Karo central legalist and mystic diarist Shlomo Alkabetz; Hayim Vital main Lurianic compiler and other writings Safed Meditative Kabbalah: Vital – Shaarei Kedusha (Gates of Holiness), Luria – Yichudim method
Maharal's mystical theology	16th century	Medieval Kabbalah expressed in non-Kabbalistic philosophical theology: Judah Loew (Maharal) Prague
Early Lurianic and post-medieval Kabbalism	16th-mid–18th centuries	Esoteric Lurianism, the second of Kabbalah's two systems of theosophy after Medieval-Cordoverian, incorporating dynamic myth of exile and redemption in divinity taught by Isaac Luria 1570–1572. Other post-medieval popularising/ethical Kabbalah based itself on the more exoteric system of Moses Cordovero: Disciples compile Kitvei Ari Lurianic thought: Hayim Vital – Etz Hayim (Tree of Life); Israel Sarug spread Lurianism in Europe; Lurianic exegesis and meditative methods dominated other post-medieval Kabbalah trends Popularising Kabbalistic Musar and homiletic literature 1550s–1750s: Moses Cordovero – Tomer Devorah (Palm Tree of Deborah); Eliyahu de Vidas – Reshit Chochmah (Beginning of Wisdom); Kav ha-Yashar; Isaiah Horowitz (Shelah) – Shnei Luchot HaBrit (Tablets of the Covenant) Central Europe Kabbalistic renewal and scholarship: Abraham Azulai; Chaim ibn Attar (Or ha-Hayim) Torah commentary Moshe Chaim Luzzatto (Ramchal) Italian early 18th century mystical-messianic circle, new public dissemination and revelation of Kabbalah; Joseph Ergas
Sabbatean movements	1665–c. 19th century	Kabbalistic messianic-mystical heresies developing antinomian new theologies from Zoharic and Lurianic Kabbalah. Theological spectrum from mild to strong: Sabbateans: Sabbatai Zevi messianic claimant Islamic convert Nathan of Gaza Sabbatean prophet Moderate-crypto and radical-antinomian factions Emden-Eybeschutz controversy and Rabbinic excommunication of Sabbateans Frankism: Jacob Frank messianic claimant pseudo-Christian convert, late 18th century nihilism
Early and formative Hasidic Judaism	1730s–1850s	Eastern European mystical revival movement, popularising and psychologising Kabbalah through Panentheism and the Tzadik mystical leader. Neutralised messianic danger expressed in Sabbateanism: Pre-Hasidic origins: Baal Shem Eastern Europe Practical Kabbalists; Tzadikim Nistarim mythology Early Hasidism: Israel ben Eliezer (Baal Shem Tov, Besht) founder of Hasidism; Dov Ber of Mezeritch (The Magid) systemiser and architect of Hasidism; Jacob Joseph of Polonne; Levi Yitzhak of Berditchev Main Hasidic schools of thought (mystics after 1850s shown later): Mainstream Hasidic Tzadikism: Elimelech of Lizhensk – Noam Elimelech (Pleasantness of Elimelech); Yaakov Yitzchak of Lublin (The Chozeh) Chabad intellectual Hasidism – Russia: Shneur Zalman of Liadi – Tanya (Likutei Amarim-Collected Words) theorist of Hasidism; Aaron of Staroselye Breslav imaginative Hasidism – Ukraine: Nachman of Breslav – Likutei Moharan (Collected teachings); Nathan of Breslav Peshischa-Kotzk introspective Hasidism – Poland, mystical offshoot from: Mordechai Yosef Leiner of Izbica – Mei Hashiloach (Waters of Shiloah), personal illumination Hasidic storytelling: Shivchei HaBesht (Praises of the Besht) published 1814; Sippurei Ma'asiyot (Stories that were told) Nachman of Breslav's 13 mystical tales 1816
Later traditional Lurianic Kabbalah	18th century–today	Traditionalist esoteric interpretations and practice of Lurianic Kabbalah from 18th century until today, apart from Hasidic adaptions: Brody Kloiz and pre-Hasidic introverted Hasidim kabbalistic circles in Eastern Europe. Renewed esotericism in response to Sabbatean heresy Mitnagdic-Lithuanian non-Hasidic Kabbalah: Elijah ben Shlomo Zalman (Vilna Gaon, Gra) figurehead of Mitnagdim 18th century Chaim of Volozhin – Nefesh HaChaim (Soul of Life) theorist of Mitnagdism, founder of Yeshiva movement Shlomo Elyashiv; Influence of Hasidism on later Lithuanian Musar-ethics of Eliyahu Dessler Mizrahi-Sephardi Oriental Kabbalah: Shalom Sharabi 18th century (from Yemen) and Beit El Synagogue (Jerusalem) introverted esotericism response to Sabbateanism. Lurianic exposition and elite meditation circle Chaim Yosef David Azulai (Hida) 18th century Yosef Hayyim (Ben Ish Chai) 19th century Hakham Baghdad; Abuhatzeira Moroccan Kabbalist dynasty Mordechai Sharabi; Yitzhak Kaduri 20th century Ashkenazi European Kabbalah (apart from Hasidic thought): Shaar Hashamayim Yeshiva (Jerusalem); Yehuda Ashlag 20th century Israel – HaSulam (The Ladder) Lurianic Zohar
Later Hasidic Judaism	1850s–today	Dynastic succession and modernising society turned Hasidism away from pre-18₩10s mystical revivalism, to post-1850s consolidation and rabbinic conservatism. Mystical focus continued in some schools: Yitzchak Eisik Safrin of Komarno visionary mystic Chabad-Lubavitch – intellectual Hasidism communication Zadok HaKohen late 19th century Izbica school Aharon Roth early 20th century Jerusalem piety Kalonymus Kalman Shapira response to Holocaust; Menachem Mendel Schneerson (Lubavitch Rebbe) Hasidic outreach and 1990s messianism Breslav contemporary mystical revivalism
Syntheses of Haskalah, political ideologies and secular culture with mystical elements	c. 1800s-1950s	Haskalah Jewish Enlightenment promoted critical Rationalism, strongly opposing Kabbalistic and Hasidic anti-modern mysticism. However, moderate Maskilim began scholarly investigation of Jewish mystical texts, and adapted Haskalah to Orthodox religiosity, while modern Jewish philosophy encountered universalist intellectual mystical elements in German Idealism. Late 1800s East Europe shift to Jewish political movements awakened secular Jewish cultural spirituality: Elijah Benamozegh 1800s Universalist, modern interpretation of Kabbalah, continuing Italian Jewry's fusion of Kabbalah with general Humanist culture Wissenschaft des Judentums early critical-historical scholars of jewish mystical texts: Adolf Jellinek 1800s Austrian Reform Rabbi scholar German Idealist rational mystical elements in modern Jewish philosophy: Nachman Krochmal Galicia early 1800s, Jewish Hegelianism Mystical elements and influences in Post-1880s Jewish political movements and secular Jewish culture: Secular Yiddish Renaissance mystical themes in Yiddish literature Jewish Autonomism cultural folkism and Jewish folklorists Cultural Zionism National revival secular spirituality Hayim Nahman Bialik, Israel's National Poet, and mystical influences on secular Hebrew literature Fusions of Kabbalah and Hasidism with Jewish anarchism
Neo-Hasidism and Neo-Kabbalah	c. 1900–today	Modernist and Non-Orthodox Jewish denominations' adapted spiritual teaching of Kabbalistic and Hasidic theology and mysticism to modern critical thought and interpretations: Early 20th century: Martin Buber from existential Neo-Hasidism to dialogical encounter Hillel Zeitlin Philosophical Neo-Hasidism; Erich Neumann Jungian interpretation of Hasidic Kabbalah and Depth psychology Post War and contemporary: Abraham Joshua Heschel Neo-traditional aggadic Judaism; Zalman Schachter-Shalomi Jewish Renewal; Arthur Green Reconstructionist academic and mystical theologian Lawrence Kushner Reform Neo-Kabbalah; Gershon Winkler shamanic Judaism Influence on modern and postmodern Jewish philosophy: Jewish existentialism subjective experience of Divine relationship Postmodern Jewish philosophy narratives of meaning Independent scholarship: Sanford Drob – The New Kabbalah; Zevi Slavin – Seekers of Unity
Zionist and monistic mystical thought of Rav Kook	c. 1910s–today	Innovative teachings and influence of Abraham Isaac Kook, pre-State Chief Rabbi of Mandate Palestine and poetic mystic. Harmonistic unity of religion and secularism, halakha and aggadah, activism and quietism, developed from Kabbalistic, Hasidic, philosophic and secular thought: Abraham Isaac Kook Neo-Hasidic monistic poetic mysticism beyond Kabbalah and Philosophy; Atchalta De'Geulah Religious Zionism; Rav Kook's partial influence on Modern Orthodox Judaism
Academic study of Jewish mysticism	c. 1920s–today	Critical-historical study of Jewish mystical texts began in 19th century, but Gershom Scholem's school in the mid-20th century founded the methodological disciple in academia, returning mysticism to a central position in Jewish historiography and Jewish studies departments. Select historian examples: First generation: Gershom Scholem discipline founder Hebrew University; Alexander Altmann American initiator Present generation, multi-disciplinary approaches: Moshe Idel Hebrew University revisionism Elliot R. Wolfson feminist contributions

== See also ==
- Angels in Judaism
- Ein Sof
- Four Worlds
- Gnosticism
- Jewish mystical exegesis
- List of Jewish Kabbalists
- List of Jewish mysticism scholars
- Mandaeism
- Primary texts of Kabbalah
