= List of Jewish mysticism scholars =

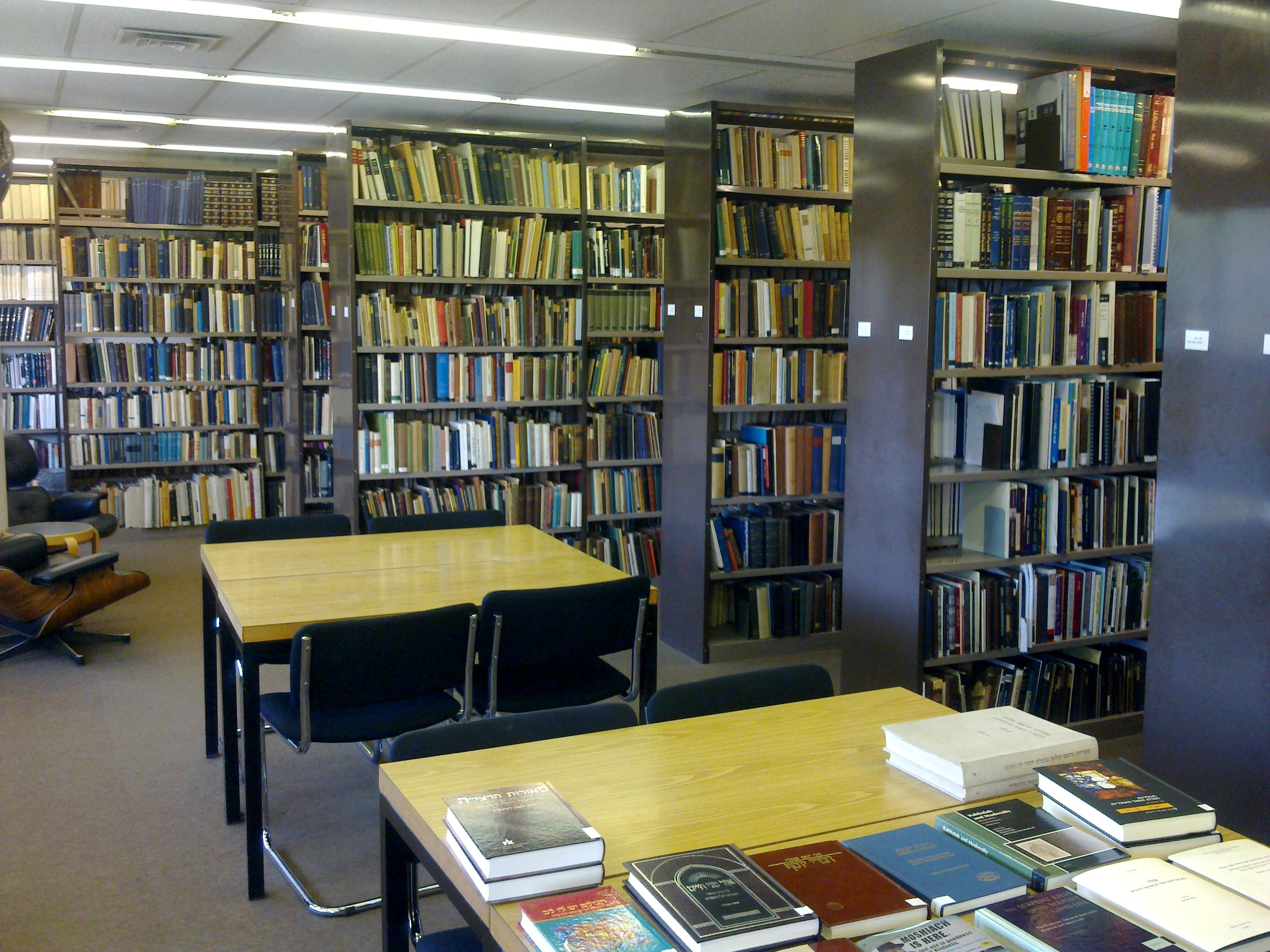
Scholem Collection of Jewish mysticism archive room in the National Library of Israel (Hebrew University campus), Jerusalem

Academic-historical research into Jewish mysticism is a modern multi-discipline university branch of Jewish studies. It studies the texts and historical contexts of Judaic mysticism using objective historical-critical methods of Religious studies, such as Philology, History of ideas, Social history and Phenomenology. The historical development of Jewish mysticism under study covers the range of phases, forms and expressions, from early Rabbinic Merkabah mysticism, through Medieval Hasidei Ashkenaz and Classical Kabbalah, early-modern Safed Kabbalah and Sabbateanism, to modern Hasidism and 20th century expressions. It is often seen as a parallel field to academic research into rationalist Jewish philosophy, though some scholars contribute in both areas. In Israel both subjects, together with Ethical literature, share the umbrella department of Jewish thought.

Historical research into Jewish mysticism was first prepared by the 19th century Wissenschaft des Judentums school, whose historiography ignored, opposed or downplayed Kabbalah. The founding of the present flourishing University discipline is attributed to Gershom Scholem and his school in the Hebrew University of Jerusalem in the 20th century, whose historiography positioned Jewish mysticism as a mainstream vitalising source in the centre of Jewish development. A second generation of scholars are today found in Israel, the United States and Europe. The field is broadly divided into three camps:

1. Professors/researchers of Jewish mysticism/thought in academia, who study Jewish mysticism through its internal textual development
2. Professors/researchers of Jewish history/society in academia, who contribute to the study of Jewish mysticism through its external social contexts
3. Independent historian researchers outside of Universities, who follow a religious historiography, but use the scholarly academic apparatus of research, sourcing and presentation. This research is most common in relation to Hasidism, due to its social popularisation of Kabbalah. These works are not usually cited in the critical-methodology of academia, but work is being done to examine their findings

Spiritual figures within the Jewish mystical tradition are not listed here, but in Timeline List of Jewish Kabbalists. Contemporary teachers of Jewish mysticism across the Jewish denominations, listed there, should only be listed here if they also publish scholarly-form historical research into Jewish mysticism. Academic scholars of Jewish mysticism have followed a diverse range in personal belief commitment or detachment to Jewish mysticism, independent of their research.

== Prelude historians of Judaism before Scholem ==
- Aaron ben David Hayyun
- Heinrich Graetz (1817–1891) (Wissenschaft des Judentums, disparaged Kabbalah)
- Jewish Encyclopedia 1901-1906 (Wissenschaft des Judentums)
- Simon Dubnow (1860–1941) (historian and folkist ideologue, initial Hasidism history)
- Moses Gaster (1856–1939) (folklorist)
- Isaac Broyde (1867–1922) (author of Jewish Encyclopedia articles)
- Adolf Jellinek (1821–1893) (Austrian Rabbi and scholar)

== Academic scholars of Jewish mysticism/thought ==
=== Israel ===
- Gershom Scholem (1897–1982) (Founder of academic discipline, Hebrew University, new historiography represented in Encyclopaedia Judaica 1971–1972)
- Martin Buber (1878–1965) (Interpretation of Hasidism to his own Existentialist Philosophy, Hebrew University, founder of Neo-Hasidism)
- Joseph Dan (1935–2022) (Scholem chair at Hebrew University)
- Moshe Idel (1947-) (revision of Scholem's views and Ecstatic Kabbalah)
- Yehuda Liebes (1947-) (Hebrew University)
- Rachel Elior (1949-) (Hebrew University)
- Boaz Huss (1959-) (Ben Gurion University)
- J. H. Chajes (1965-) (University of Haifa)
- Jonathan Garb (1967-) (Hebrew University)

=== United States ===
- Abraham Joshua Heschel (1907–1972) (Neo-Hasidic philosopher and theologian, Jewish Theological Seminary)
- Alexander Altmann (1906–1987) (a founding figure in US, also scholar of Jewish philosophy, taught Brandeis University)
- Elliot Wolfson (1956-) (University of California, Santa Barbara)
- Arthur Green (1941-) (Hasidism scholar, also Reconstructionist/Neo-Hasidic theologian, Hebrew College, Boston)
- Norman Lamm (1927–2020) (Modern Orthodox leader, Hasidic-Mitnagdic study, Yeshiva University)
- Allan Nadler (1954-) (Mitnagdic response to Hasidism)
- Daniel C. Matt (academic translation of the Zohar)
- Shaul Magid (Indiana University)

=== Europe ===
- Louis Jacobs (1920–2006) (London, Hasidic studies, Conservative Judaism theologian)

George Vajda (Medieval Kabbalah)

== Religious historiography researchers of Jewish mysticism ==
=== Israel ===
Moshe Hallamish is Full Professor of Jewish Mysticism, Bar-Ilan University, Israel. He has authored and edited many books and is editor of DAAT, a journal of Jewish Philosophy and Kabbalah.

=== United States ===
- Aryeh Kaplan (Meditation and the Prophets, Kabbalistic Meditation, Breslov Hasidic history)
- Jacob Immanuel Schochet (Habad Hasidic history)
- Nathaniel Deutsch (Kabbalah, Merkabah and Hasisdism)

== See also ==
- Jewish studies (surveys each university)
- Jewish thought
- Jewish mysticism
- Religious studies
- Historiography
- Gershom Scholem
- List of Jewish Kabbalists
