= Abin ha-Gadol =

10th century French rabbi

Rabbi Abin (or Abun) ha-Gadol (the Great; אבון הגדול; d. circa 970) was one of the most important French rabbis of the 10th century, flourishing at the same time as Rav Sherira Gaon in Babylon. Solomon Luria wrote that, "He was renowned as a great Torah scholar, for his immense wealth and for his knowledge of the hidden secrets. He could expound upon every letter in 49 facets."

== Family ==
Rabbi Abin ha-Gadol was the head of the Abun family, one of the most influential families among early Ashkenazi Rishonim. The family played an influential role in creating Ashkenazi Hasidim in the generation of Rabbeinu Gershom ben Judah and many of them were described as "Hasidim" (Pious).

He was a grandson of Rav Joseph ben Simeon the Elder of Le Mans.

His sons were Rabbi Isaac Hasid and Rabbi Joshua Hasid.

- Rabbi Isaac's son was Rabbi Simeon bar Isaac, known as Rabbi Simeon the Great of Mainz.
- Rabbi Joshua's son was also called Rabbi Isaac Hasid.
  - Rabbi Isaac (ben Joshua)'s son was Eliezer ben Isaac ha-Gadol. His grandson was Rabbi Kalonymus ben Isaac the Elder, the father of Rabbi Samuel of Speyer, the father of Abraham who was the Rosh yeshiva of Speyer and Rabbi Judah ben Samuel of Regensburg.
