= Menahem Recanati =

Italian rabbi (1223–1290)

Title page of the first edition of Rabbi Recanati's commentary on the Torah (Venice, 1523)

Menahem ben Benjamin Recanati (Hebrew: מנחם בן בנימין ריקנטי; 1223–1290) was an Italian rabbi who was born and died in the city of Recanati, who devoted the chief part of his writings to the Kabbalah.

== Works ==
In addition to the halachic rulings collected in Piskei Recanati (his only halachic work), Recanati wrote a kabbalistic commentary on the Torah, a commentary on the siddur, and discussions of the commandments. Piskei Recanati was first published in Bologna, 1538, and was published several times thereafter.

- Perush 'Al ha-Torah (Venice, 1523), a work full of mystical deductions and meanings based upon a textual interpretation of the Bible; it describes many visions and celestial revelations claimed to have been experienced by the author, who was influenced by kabbalistic ideas, and expresses the highest respect for all kabbalistic authors, even the most recent apocryphal ones. The work was republished with a commentary by Mordecai Jaffe, at Lublin in 1595 and was also translated into Latin by Pico di Mirandola.
- Perush ha-Tefillot and Ṭa'ame ha-Miẓwot, published together (Constantinople, 1543–1544; Basel, 1581). Like the preceding work, these are strongly tinctured with German mysticism. Recanati frequently quotes Judah he-Hasid of Regensburg, Eleazar of Worms, and their disciples, and alludes also to the Spanish kabbalists, Nahmanides among them. He is rarely original, quoting almost always other authorities. Although Recanati had a high reputation for sanctity, he exercised less influence on his contemporaries than upon posterity. To assist him in his kabbalistic researches, he studied logic and philosophy; and he endeavors to support the Kabbalah by philosophical arguments.
- Pisḳe Hilkot, Bologna, 1538.
