= Estries =

Vampires in Jewish folklore

Estries (Hebrew: סטרייאס, romanized: striyas) are vampires of Jewish folklore that were believed to prey on Jews, in particular babies. Estries were typically female.

Estries first appear in the works of the Ashkenazi Hasidim, a medieval pietistic movement, particularly in Judah ben Samuel of Regensburg's Sefer Hasidim. The name was borrowed from Middle French and descends from the Latin word strix, a term for an owl also used for a kind of cannibalistic witch. An estrie, like other vampires, needs to feed on blood to survive and were more indiscriminate in their choice of victims. However, the prohibition on eating meat without the blood removed from it is the most basic rule of kashrut (Jewish dietary laws), and thus their habits were doubly repulsive to Jews.

In some accounts, estries were considered a kind of succubus: both were portrayed as beautiful, bloodthirsty female demons, with succubi thought to favour babies and young children as prey. Succubi were said to kill pregnant women and babies out of jealousy or spite, and to seduce or rape sleeping men. Estries and succubi were both said to be able to appear as humans or in spirit form at will, but Estries were also described as able to turn into birds or cats and various other animals.

== Sefer Hasidim ==
The Sefer Hasidim, a book on Jewish piety, stated:

1465 There are women that are called estrie... They were created at sunset [before the first Sabbath before creation]. As a result of this, they are able to change form. There was one woman who was a estrie and she was very sick and there were two women with her at night; one was sleeping and one was awake. And the sick woman stood up and loosened her hair and she was about to fly and suck the blood of the sleeping woman. And the woman who was awake screamed and woke her friend and they grabbed the sick estrie, and after this she slept. And moreover, if she had been able to grab the other woman, then she, the estrie, would have lived. Since she was not able to hurt the other woman, the estrie died, because she needs to drink the blood of living flesh. The same is true of the werewolf. And since....the estrie need to loosen their hair before they fly, one must adjure her to come with her hair bound so that she cannot go anywhere without permission. And if a estrie is injured or seen by someone, she cannot live unless she eats of the bread and salt of the one who struck her. Then her soul will return to the way it was before.
1466 There was a woman who was suspected of being a estrie, and she was injured when she appeared to a Jew as a cat and he hit her. The next day she asked him to give her some of his bread and salt, and he wanted to give it to her. An old man said to him (Ecc. 7:16) "Be not overly righteous." When others have sinned one must not show kindness, for if she lives, she will harm people. Thus the Holy One, blessed be He created her for you [as a test].

Estries were believed able to fly if their hair was unbound, while binding an estrie's hair would keep it grounded.

== Defense tactics against estries ==
According to the Sefer Hasidim, estries can be injured and, while they prefer the night, it was unclear whether they were cursed to it like other vampires. Estries were considered undeterred by religious iconography, distinguishing them from other mythological demons. Estries were believed to be able to walk into holy places, and sometimes to seek prayer for healing from unsuspecting religious people seeking to do good. But blessing an Estries was considered an evil act in ancient cultures. If injured, an estrie was believed able to heal either from drinking blood or from consuming bread and salt given to them by the one who caused the injury.

Though methods described for killing estries were conventional, it was believed that burial alone would not prevent an estrie from returning: it must have its mouth packed with earth, or be decapitated or burned. Later mythology attributed to estries the same vulnerabilities as are associated with other vampires: silver bullets, wooden stakes, blessed weapons and holy water.

== See also ==
- Abyzou
- Al
- Lamashtu
- Lamia
- Lilith
- Lilu (mythology)
- Nocnitsa
- Shedim
