= Eliezer ben Isaac ha-Gadol =

Eleventh century German rabbi

Eliezer ben Isaac ha-Gadol was a German rabbi of the eleventh century. He was a pupil of his cousin R. Simon ha-Gadol of Mainz and of R. Gershom Me'or ha-Golah. David Conforte, relying on the statement in the tosefta to Shab. 54b, says that Eliezer ha-Gadol was the teacher of Rashi; but Rashi himself, in citing Eliezer, does not say so. In Rashi's quotation he is sometimes called Eliezer ha-Gadol and sometimes Eliezer Gaon, which induced Azulai to consider them as two separate persons.

According to a provenance of a sacred tradition—sometimes presumed to describe the transmission of early medieval Kabbalah from Babylon to Western Europe—with the provenance itself attributed to Eleazar of Worms (13th century), this ‘Eliezer the Great’ or Eliezer Ben Isaac ha-Gadol, of the early 11th century generation of Ashkenazi Hasidim, was an ancestral member of this lineage of teachers, and a member of the Kalonymids: the Ba’al Shems or Masters of the Name in medieval Germany.

== Works ==
- According to Menahem di Lonsano Eliezer ha-Gadol was the author of the well-known Orḥot Ḥayyim or Ẓawwa'at R. Eliezer ha-Gadol, generally attributed to Eliezer b. Hyrcanus.
- As to the authorship of the seliḥah Elohai Basser 'Ammeka, recited in the service of Yom Kippur Katan and attributed to Eliezer by Michael, see Landshuth, 'Ammude ha-'Abodah, p. 20.

== Footnotes ==
Its bibliography:

- Chaim Azulai, Shem ha-Gedolim, i. 12a, ii., s.v.;
- Leopold Zunz, Z. G. pp. 47 et seq.;
- Jellinek, Adolf (1853). Bet ha-Midrasch. 3. Jerusalem, 27, 28 of the Preface;
- Fuenn, Samuel Joseph, Keneset Yisrael, p. 124;
- Moritz Steinschneider, Cat. Bodl. cols. 957-958;
- Julius Fürst, Bibl. Jud. i. 233.
