= Dulcea of Worms =

12th-century German businesswoman

Dulcea of Worms (died November 1196) was a German-Jewish businesswoman and lender. She was the spouse of a famous Jewish leader.

== Life ==
She came from the German Jewry's elite. She married the famous theologist Eleazar of Worms, a leader of the Ḥasidei Ashkenaz, the German-Jewish pietist movement. While her spouse devoted his time to his religious pursuits, she took responsibility for the family's economy and business, and she is known in history as the economic support for an extensive household, including children, students, and teachers. She conducted a business in parchment scrolls in order to support the family and enable her spouse to devote all his time to study.

Dulcea also conducted a business in parchment scrolls for extra income. Entrusted with the funds of neighbors, Dulcea made loans at profitable rates of interest on which she received commissions.

Additionally, Dulcea herself was a notable figure in her religious community, teaching and leading women in prayers and maybe was a Hazzanit.

In November 1196, Dulcea and her two daughters Bellette and Hannah were murdered by intruders, while his son was wounded. Legend has painted the murderers as crusaders, but they appear in fact to have been common criminals. The local authorities captured and executed at least one of the men in accordance with the German emperor's mandate to protect the Jews of his realm.

After her death, her husband wrote an elegy honouring and celebrating her character.

== Legacy ==
Among R. Eleazar ben Judah's surviving writings are two Hebrew accounts recounting the murders of Dulcea and their daughters, one in prose and one in poetry. In the elegy, she is described as ḥasidah (pious or saintly) and ẓadeket (righteous); she is praised for her domestic management and business finesse and her needlework, recounting that she prepared thread and gut to sew books and Torah scrolls. She was reportedly unusually learned, and is said to have instructed other women and led them in prayer.
