= Ummah =

Arabic term used to refer to the collective nation of Muslim people

Ummah (/ˈʊmə/; Arabic: أُمَّة [ˈʊm.mæ]) is an Arabic word meaning Muslim identity, nation, religious community, or the concept of a commonwealth of the Muslim believers (أمة المؤمنين ummat al-muʼminīn). It is a synonym for ummat al-Islām (أمّةْ الإِسْلَامُ, lit. 'the Islamic nation'); it is commonly used to mean the collective community of Muslim people. In the Quran, the ummah generally refers to a community, people, or group united by shared beliefs. The Quran uses the term in multiple contexts, including nations, religious communities, and communities associated with prophets. The word ummah (pl. umam [ˈʊmæm]) means nation in Arabic. For example, the Arabic term for the United Nations is الأمم المتحدة al-Umam al-Muttaḥidah, and the term الأمة العربية al-Ummah al-ʻArabiyyah is used to refer to "the Arab Nation".

Ummah is distinguished from shaʻb (شَعْب [ˈʃæʕb], "people"), which means a nation with common ancestry or geography. The word ummah differs from the concept of a country or people. In its greater context it is used to describe a larger group of people. For example, in Arabic the word شعب shaʻab ("people") would be used to describe the citizens of Syria regardless of religion. However, the term ummah is used to describe the Islamic world as a whole, which includes only Muslim Syrians as well as all the Muslims in the Arab world. Ummah can be a supra-national polity with a common history and identity based on religion. Pan-Islamism advocates for the unity of Muslims in one nation as an Islamic country or an Islamic state.

== Islamic usage and origin ==
The phrase Ummah Wāhidah in the Quran (أمة واحدة, "One Nation") refers to all the Islamic world as it existed at the time. The Quran says: "You [Muslims] are the best nation brought out for Mankind, commanding what is righteous (معروف Ma'rūf, lit. "recognized [as good]") and forbidding what is wrong (منكر Munkar, lit. "recognized [as evil]")" [3:110]. The usage is further clarified by the Constitution of Medina, an early document said to have been negotiated by Muhammad in CE 622 with the leading clans of Medina, which explicitly refers to Jews, Christians and pagan citizens of Medina as members of the Ummah.

== Emergence ==
World percentage of Muslims by country

At the time of Muhammad, before the conception of the ummah, Arab communities were typically governed by kinship. In other words, the political ideology of the Arabs centred on tribal affiliations and blood relations. In the midst of a tribal society, the religion of Islam emerged and along with it the concept of the ummah. The ummah emerged according to the idea that a messenger or prophet had been sent to the nation. Unlike earlier messengers, who had been sent to various nations in the past (as can be found among the prophets in the Hebrew Bible), Muhammad sought to develop an ummah that was universal and not only for Arabs. Muhammad saw his purpose as the transmission of a divine message and the leadership of the Islamic nation. Islam sees Muhammad as the messenger to the ummah, transmitting a divine message, and implying that God is directing the life affairs of the ummah. Accordingly, the purpose of the ummah was to be based on religion by following the commands of God, rather than kinship.

Immediately after Muhammad's death in 632, caliphates were established and the Shias emerged. Caliphates were Islamic states under the leadership of a political successor to the Islamic prophet Muhammad. These polities developed into multi-ethnic trans-national empires.

== Quran ==
There are 62 instances in which the term ummah is mentioned in the Quran, and they almost always refer to ethical, linguistic, or religious bodies of people who are subject to the divine plan of salvation. The meaning of the term appears to transform throughout the chronology of the Quran. When it is first used in the Quran, it is hardly distinguishable from the term qawm, which can be translated to 'people'. The Quran recognizes that each ummah has a messenger that has been sent to relay a divine message to the nation and that all ummahs await God's ultimate judgment. Although the meaning of the ummah begins simply with a general application of the word, it gradually develops in reference to a general religious community and then evolves to refer to the Muslim nation specifically.

Before it referred exclusively to Muslims, the ummah encompassed Jewish and Christian communities alongside Muslims and referred to them as the People of the Book. That is supplemented by the Constitution of Medina which declares all members of the ummah, regardless of religion, to be of "one ummah". In those passages of the Quran, ummah may be referring to a unity of mankind through the shared beliefs of the monotheistic religions. Frederick Mathewson Denny argues that the most recent ummah that received a messenger from God is the Arab ummah. As the Muslims became stronger during their residence in Medina, the Arab ummah narrowed into an ummah exclusively for Muslims. This is evidenced by the resacralisation of the Kaaba and Muhammad's command to take a pilgrimage to Mecca, along with the redirection of prayer from Jerusalem to Mecca.

The period in which the term is used most often is within the third Meccan period, followed by the Medinian period. The extensive use of the term during both time periods indicates that Muhammad had begun to arrive at the concept of the ummah to specify the genuinely Muslim nation. Furthermore, the early Meccan passages generally equate ummah as religion, but in the Medinan passages refer more specifically to the relations of ummah and religion. The final passage that refers to ummah in the Quran refers to the Muslims as the "best nation" and accordingly led to it being an exclusive reference to Islam. A verse in the Quran also mentions the ummah in the context of all of the messengers, and that their ummah (nation) is "one" as God is their Lord entirely:

O messengers, eat from the good foods and work righteousness. Indeed, I, of what you do, am Knowing. And indeed this, your ummah (nation), is one ummah (nation), and I am your Lord, so fear Me. [Qur'an, Surah Al-Mu'minun (The Believers) (23:51–52)]

== Mecca ==
Initially, it did not appear that the new Muslim nation would oppose the tribes that already existed in Mecca. The first Muslims did not need to make a break with traditional Quraysh customs since the vision for the new nation included moral norms that were not unfamiliar to the tribal society of Mecca. However, what distinguished this community from the tribes was its focus of the place of those morals within a person's life.

== Medina ==
After Muhammad and the first converts to Islam were forced to leave Mecca, the community was welcomed in Medina by the Ansar, a group of Pagans who had converted to Islam. Despite Medina already being occupied by numerous Jews and polytheistic tribes, the arrival of Muhammad and his followers provoked no opposition from Medina's residents. Upon arriving in Medina, Muhammad established the Constitution of Medina with the various tribal leaders in order to form the Meccan immigrants and the Medinan residents into a single nation, the ummah. Rather than limiting members of the ummah to a single tribe or religious affiliation as had been the case when the ummah first developed in Mecca, the Constitution of Medina ensured that the ummah was composed of a variety of people and beliefs essentially making it to be supra-tribal. Islamic historian, Tabari, suggested that Muhammad's initial intentions upon arriving in Medina was to establish a mosque, however this is unlikely. Tabari also claimed that Muhammad observed the first Friday prayer in Medina. It occurred on Friday because Friday served as a market day in Medina to enable Jews to observe the sabbath. Membership to the ummah was not restricted to adhering to the Muslim faith but rather encompassed all of the tribes as long as they vowed to recognize Muhammad as the nation and political figure of authority.

The Constitution of Medina declared that the Jewish tribes and the Muslims from Medina formed 'one ummah.' It is possible that the Medinan ummah was purely secular (compared to the later transformation of the ummah in Mecca) due to its variety of beliefs and practices of its members. The purpose of the Constitution of Medina was to uphold political obligations and social relations between the various tribes. The community members in Medina, although not derived from the same faith, were committed to each other through a desire to defend the common good of the nation. In other words, the nation was united according to preserve its shared interests. The people of other religious beliefs, particularly those that are considered to be "People of the Book" were granted the special protection of God through the dhimmah contract. These other religious groups were guaranteed security by God and Muhammad because of their common religious history as being the "People of the Book". The dhimmah served as a sort of alliance between Muslims and non-Muslims. In the earlier treaties of the dhimmah, both groups were viewed as equal in status and both were obligated to help the other. However, in later treaties, after Islam had gained more power throughout Arabia, the dhimmah was perceived as the fulfilment of the religious duties of Muslims along with the payment of zakat. With the new contract of dhimmah, non-Muslims' protection by God and Muhammad became dependent on their payment.

=== Constitution of Medina ===
The Constitution of Medina is a document created by Muhammad to regulate social and political life in Medina. It deals with various tribal issues such as the organization and leadership of the participating tribal groups, warfare, blood money, ransom of captives, and war expenditures. It is at the beginning of the document that the Muslims from the Quraysh (those from Mecca) and the Muslims from Yathrib (those from Medina) are declared to be an ummah or one nation. The word ummah appears again when the document refers to the treaty of the Jews and states that the Yahūd Banī ' Awf, or Jews, are an ummah that exists alongside the ummah of the Muslims or may be included in the same ummah as the Muslims.

The document states that the Jews who join the Muslims will receive aid and equal rights. In addition, the Jews will be guaranteed security from the Muslims, and are granted to maintain their own religion just as the Muslims will maintain theirs. This implies that the ummah is not strictly a religious nation in Medina. The Constitution of Medina lists the various Medinan tribes derived from the Aws and Khazraj as well as the several Jewish tribes that are granted to keep their tribal organization and leadership. The document also reveals that each group, the Muslims and the Jews, is responsible for its own finances except during time of war, when the two are able to share expenses.

== Back to Mecca ==
After the Muslim takeover of Mecca, membership in the ummah required a commitment to Islam. This happened as a result of Islam beginning to distinguish itself not just from paganism but also Judaism and Christianity by emphasizing a model of nation based on Abraham. The membership of the ummah was now based on two main principles: the first is to worship God alone, and secondly, to worship God properly, one must be in a guided nation. The essentials of the new society were the new relations between human beings and God and between human beings and one another. The society was held together by Muhammad. Feuding among Muslim clans was forbidden. Muhammad's nation was designed to transform the world itself through action in the world.

== See also ==
- Caliphate
- Christendom
- Constitution of Medina
- Divisions of the world in Islam
- Islamic missionary activity
- Jewish peoplehood
- Kafir
- List of countries by Muslim population
- Muslim population growth
- Muslim world
- Organisation of Islamic Cooperation
- Pan-Islamism
