= Hasid =

Jewish honorific denoting exceptionally pious persons

Ḥasīd (Hebrew: חסיד, "pious", "saintly", "godly man"; plural חסידים "Hasidim") is a Jewish honorific, frequently used as a term of exceptional respect in the Talmudic and early medieval periods. It denotes a person who is scrupulous in his observance of Jewish law, and often one who goes beyond the legal requirements of ritual and ethical Jewish observance in daily life. In the Mishnah, the term is used thirteen times, the majority of which being in the Tractate Pirkei Avot.

== Hebrew etymology ==
The Hebrew word Ḥasīd appears for the first time in the Torah (Deuteronomy 33:8) with respect to the tribe of Levi, and all throughout the Hebrew Book of Psalms, with its various declensions. In classic rabbinic literature it differs from "Tzadik" ("righteous") by instead denoting one who goes beyond his ordinary duty. The literal meaning of Ḥasīd derives from Chesed (חסד) (= "kindness"), the outward expression of love (lovingkindness) for God and other people. This spiritual devotion motivates pious conduct beyond everyday limits. The devotional nature of its description lent itself to a few Jewish movements in history being known as "Hasidim". Two of these derived from the Jewish mystical tradition, as it could tend towards piety over legalism.

Rabbi Saadia Gaon, the medieval Hebrew linguist and biblical exegete, translated the Hebrew word Ḥasīd in Psalm 18:25 into the Judeo-Arabic word אלמחסן, meaning, "he that does good."

== Usage in rabbinic texts ==
As a personal honorific, both "Ḥasīd" and "Tzadik" could be applied independently to the same individual with both different qualities. The 18th-century Vilna Gaon, for instance, at that time the chief opponent of the new Jewish mystical movement that became known as "Hasidism", was renowned for his righteous life. In tribute to his scholarship, he became popularly honored with the formal title of "Genius", while amongst the Hasidic movement's leadership, despite his fierce opposition to their legalistic tendencies, he was respectfully referred to as "The Gaon, the Ḥasīd from Vilna".

A general dictum in the Talmud (Baba Kama 30^{a}) states: "He that wishes to be pious (Aramaic: ḥasīda), let him uphold the things described under the indemnity laws in the Mishnaic Order of Neziqin." Rava, differing, said: "Let him observe the things transcribed in Pirkei Avot." (ibid.)

Of the few known pious men in the early 2nd century, the Talmud acknowledges the following: "Wherever we read (in Talmudic writings), 'It is reported of a pious man', either R. Juda b. Baba it meant or R. Judah, the son of R. Ilai."

== Other uses ==
In the aggregate, "Ḥasīd" may also refer to members of any of the following Jewish movements:

- the Hasideans of the Maccabean period, around the 2nd century BCE
- the New Testament twice refers to Jesus of Nazareth as the Davidic ḥasīd foretold in Psalm 16:10 (Book of Acts 2:27; 13:35 ὅσιος, quoting Ps 15:10 Greek Septuagint translation; "ḥasīd" is here used in the Hebrew NT translations of Delitzsch, Salkinson-Ginsburg, “The Way,” etc., and is paralleled by the Syriac Peshitta). Followers of this royal ḥasīd were commanded to practice ḥesed among themselves (Gospel of Luke 10:37, using Septuagintal poiein eleos meta from Hebrew asah ḥesed ʿim).
- the Ashkenazi Hasidim, an ascetic German mystical-ethical movement of the 12th and 13th centuries
- Hasidic Judaism (Yiddish: "Chassidische bavegung"), a movement which began in Ukraine in the 18th century

== See also ==
- Amidah
- Illui
- Tzadik
