= Jewish pope Andreas =

Legendary Jewish pope

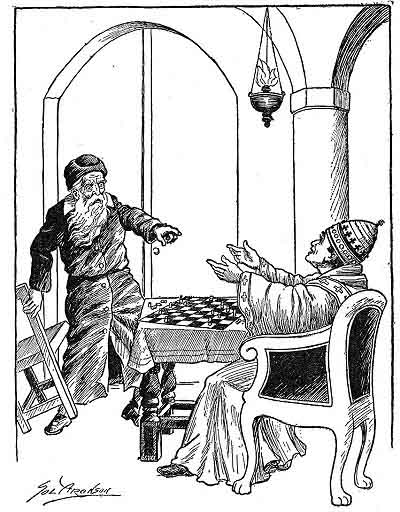
The pope rediscovers his rabbi father during a chess game; illustration in Jewish Fairy Tales and Legends (1919).

Jewish pope Andreas is a legend about a Jewish pope. The 1906 Jewish Encyclopedia writes: "According to an old Spanish document discovered among some penitential liturgies by Eliezer ben Solomon Ashkenazi, the editor of "Ṭa'am Zeḳenim" (Frankfurt am Main, 1854), Andreas was a Jew who, upon becoming a Christian, distinguished himself so markedly as to become successively cardinal and then pope.

During his pontificate, it is alleged, a calumny was lodged against the Jews, as the result of which an outbreak of the persecutions of the Jews was imminent. At the critical moment, however, the pope appeared on the scene and, by delivering a speech in favor of the Jews, succeeded in subduing the popular passion. The Jews sent a delegation of their most prominent and learned men to bear to the pontiff the expression of their gratitude. In response, the pope handed to the delegates a Selichot, or penitential prayer, which he had composed in the sacred tongue, and which he now requested them to spread broadcast among all Jewish communities, and to have incorporated in their books of prayer. This they did. The prayer bore the pope's signature "Andreas," though in print one letter was inverted."

The legend is sometimes associated with Antipope Anacletus II or with Pope Alexander III, who apparently was well-disposed toward Jews.

== Legend ==
The legend has been varied from source to source until it was accepted in its final form.

According to a traditional account, El-hanan, or Elhanan, a Jewish boy, the son of Simeon bar Isaac (c. 950), was stolen during a Jewish Sabbath by a Christian maidservant at night while he was asleep in his bed. When he woke up in an unfamiliar room, he was told his parents were dead. He was held prisoner in a monastery where he received an ecclesiastical education and rose rapidly in hierarchic circles, until he became pope.

The Jewish Encyclopedia writes of the story:

All the while, however, he is perfectly cognizant of his origin and consanguinity, though the splendor and the majesty of his position keep him from disclosing his identity.

Finally he is overcome by a craving to see his father, to which end he promulgates an edict of persecution against the Jews of Magonza (Mainz), being certain that the latter would send delegates to him to plead for its revocation, and that then Simeon, as one of the most prominent men of his community, would doubtless be found. The pope does not miscalculate. In due time the delegates of the Jews of Magonza, headed by Simeon, the pope's father, arrive in Rome. Simeon questions the cause of the cruel edict; but his astonishment is increased when, upon being given audience, he detects in the pope a quite rare degree of Jewish knowledge. The pope, moreover, invites Simeon to call in the evening for the purpose of playing chess with him. During the game, Simeon, a noted chess player, has great cause for wonderment as the pontiff uses a move that Simeon taught only his son El-hanan. The pope, unable to contain himself longer, puts the mask aside and embraces his father.

He is anxious to return to the religion of his fathers, and his resolve is strengthened as his father points out to him the Jewish doctrine concerning the regenerative power of repentance. Simeon then returns to Mainz, bearing with him a repeal of the edict, while Elhanan stays in Rome long enough to compose an anti-Christian dissertation, which he charges all his successors to peruse. He then flees to Mayence, where he lives as a pious Jew, while in Rome his fate remains forever unknown.

His father Simon writes a hymn of gratitude for his son's return: El hanan nahalato be-no'am le-hashper: "God has dealt graciously" (El hanan being an acrostic of both his son's name and his name). According to other versions, the pope leapt to his death after having addressed the cardinals from the top of a tower.

== Sources ==
The legend first appears in print in 1602 in the Basel edition of the Yiddish Mayse Bukh. Four earlier Hebrew versions of the legend, written between the early 14th and the early 16th century, are preserved in manuscripts. Three of them occur within commentaries on the liturgy of Rosh Hashanah.

== See also ==
- Pope Joan, a medieval legend of a woman who entered the clergy disguised as a man and was elected pope
- Edgardo Mortara, a 19th-century Italian Jewish boy who was baptized by a servant without his parents' knowledge and consequently removed from their custody to be given a Christian upbringing, later becoming a priest in the Catholic Church
