= Isaac ben Jacob ha-Lavan =

12th-century rabbi of Bohemia

Rabbi Isaac ben Jacob or Yitzhak ben Yaakov, nicknamed "ha-Lavan" or "the white" was a 12th-century rabbi of Bohemia. He was a Tosafist and liturgical poet who flourished at Prague in the late 12th century.

He was the brother of the renowned traveler Petachiah of Regensburg. He was among the earliest of the tosafists ("ba'ale tosafot yeshanim"), a contemporary of Rabbi Eleazar of Metz, and a pupil of Rabbenu Tam. According to Recanati, Isaac directed the yeshivah of Ratisbon. He also lived at Worms for a time.

Isaac is mentioned frequently in the Tosafot, and Isaac ben Moses, in his Or Zarua, No. 739, quotes Isaac ben Jacob's commentary on Ketubot, a manuscript of which exists in the Munich Library (No. 317). He is also mentioned in a commentary to the Pentateuch written in the first half of the 13th century. There is a piyyuṭ signed "Isaac b. Jacob," whom Zunz supposes to be Isaac ben Jacob ha-Lavan.
