= Arthur Green =

American rabbi and theologian

Arthur (Art) Green
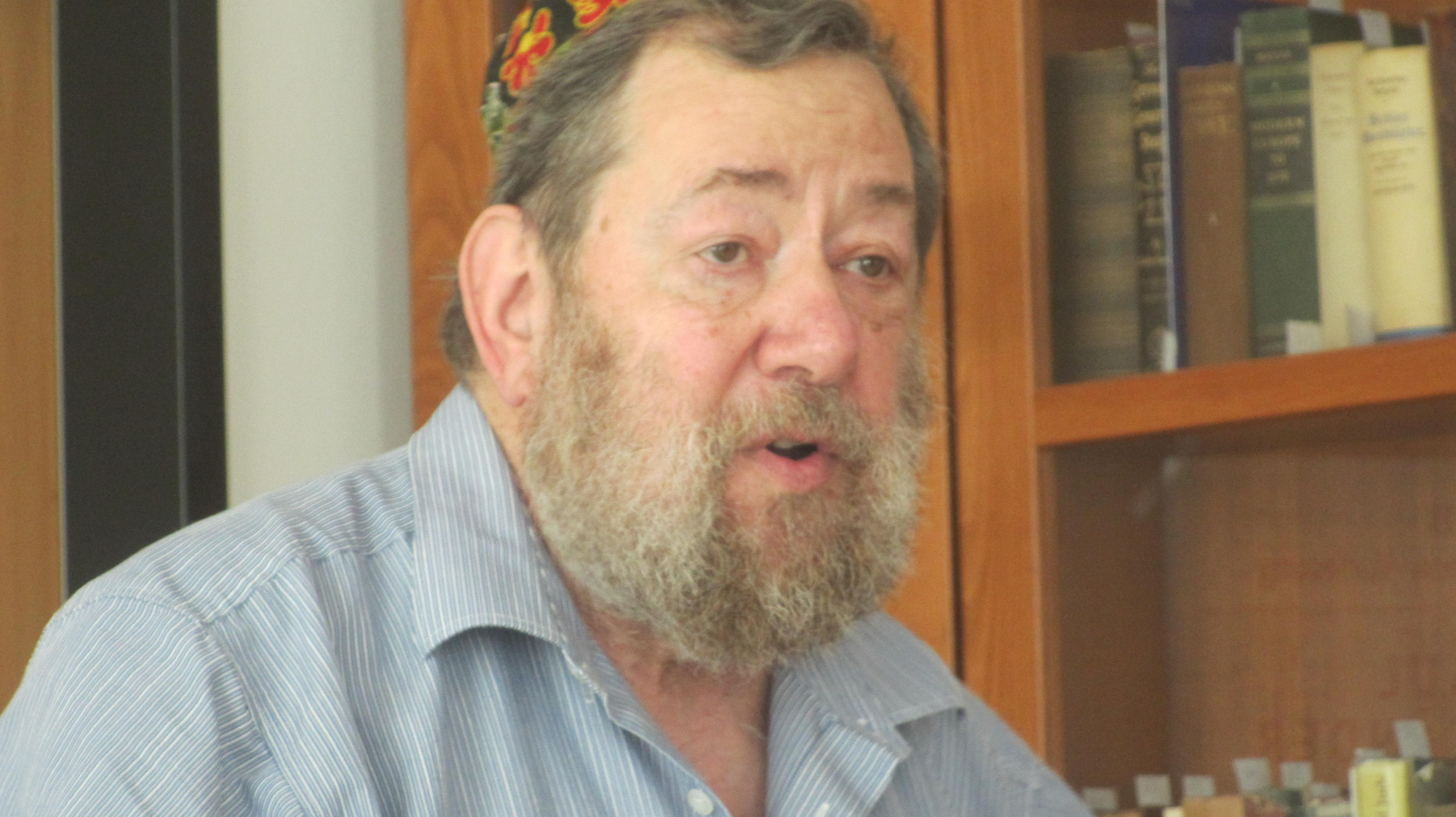
- Arthur (Art) Green
- Born: March 21, 1941 (age 85)
- Known for: Neo-Hasidism

Academic background
- Education: Jewish Theological Seminary, Brandeis University
- Doctoral advisor: Alexander Altmann
- Website: artgreen26.com

Arthur Green (Hebrew: אברהם יצחק גרין, born March 21, 1941) is an American scholar of Jewish mysticism and Neo-Hasidic theologian. He was a founding dean of the non-denominational rabbinical program at Hebrew College in Boston. He describes himself as an American Jew who was educated entirely by the generation of immigrant Jewish intellectuals cast up on American shores by World War II.

== Biography ==
Arthur (Art) Green grew up in Newark, New Jersey in a nonobservant Jewish home and attended Camp Ramah. He describes his father as a "militant atheist," but his mother, from a traditional family, felt obligated to give her son a Jewish education. He was sent to a liberal Hebrew School in the congregation of Rabbi Joachim Prinz. Later he attended the synagogue of Max Gruenewald in Millburn, New Jersey. At Camp Ramah, his introductory Talmud teacher was David Weiss-Halivni.

== Academic and rabbinic career ==
In 1957, he began his studies at Brandeis University, where he went through a crisis of faith and sought new approaches to Judaism. It is there that he encountered mystical Judaism. Green's professors at Brandeis included Nahum Glatzer and Alexander Altmann. During his college years, he also met Rabbi Zalman Schachter-Shalomi, who became a lifelong friend and mentor.

After college, Green trained for the rabbinate at the Jewish Theological Seminary of America, where he studied privately with Abraham Joshua Heschel. He returned to Brandeis in 1967, earning his doctorate with Altman. His dissertation became his book Tormented Master: The Life and Spiritual Quest of Rabbi Nahman of Bratslav.

In 1968, Green founded Havurat Shalom, an experiment in Jewish communal life and learning that became the fountainhead of the Havurah movement in American Jewish life.

Between 1973 and 1984, Green taught in the Religious Studies Department of the University of Pennsylvania. In 1984 he became dean, and then in 1987 president, of the Reconstructionist Rabbinical College in Philadelphia. In 1993, he was appointed Philip W. Lown Professor of Jewish Thought at Brandeis, inheriting a chair that had been created for his mentor Alexander Altmann. In 2003 he was invited to create a new non-denominational Rabbinical School at Hebrew College.

Green has published both academic works on the intellectual history of Jewish mysticism and Hasidism, as well as writings of a more personal theological sort. Radical Judaism, said to be his most important theological work, was published by Yale University Press in 2010, based on a series of lectures he delivered at Yale University in the fall of 2006.

Green is also known as a translator and commentator of Hasidic sources and is a key figure in the articulation of a Neo-Hasidic approach to Judaism. His two edited volumes (together with A. E. Mayse) A New Hasidism: Roots and Branches, appeared in 2019, published by the Jewish Publication Society.

Green's works have been translated into seven languages, including Hebrew. The Hebrew version of Tormented Master (Ba’al ha-Yissurim—בעל היסורים) was an influential best-seller in Israel, where Green visits and lectures frequently. An expanded Hebrew version of Radical Judaism (יהדות רדיקלית: פתיחת שער למבקשי דרך) appeared in 2016.

== Sexual misconduct allegation ==
In January 2024, Green was barred from the campus of Hebrew College following an allegation of sexual misconduct in 2022. Green publicly apologized for what he described as an "unwanted kiss," saying, "I did something wrong... I take responsibility for that. For me, it has always been about the message, the content of what I have to say, and not about me. Now that the whole world knows that I am an imperfect vessel, I hope we can move forward."

== Published works ==
- Green, Arthur (2023). Well of Living Insight: Comments on the Siddur. Be'er Press. ISBN 978-0578278407.
- Green, Arthur (2020). Judaism for the World: Reflections on God, Life, and Love. Yale University Press. ISBN 978-0-300-24998-9.
- Green, Arthur (2014). Judaism's ten best ideas. Jewish Lights. ISBN 978-1580238038.
- Green, Arthur (2015). The Heart of the Matter: Studies in Jewish Mysticism and Theology. Jewish Publication Society. ISBN 978-0-8276-1213-6.
- Green, Arthur (23 July 2013). Speaking Torah Vol 2: Spiritual Teachings from Around the Maggid's Table. Vol. 2 volumes. Turner Publishing Company. ISBN 978-1-68336-306-4.
- Green, Arthur (30 March 2010). Radical Judaism: Rethinking God and Tradition. Yale University Press. ISBN 978-0-300-15233-3.
- Green, Arthur (2004). A Guide to the Zohar. Stanford University Press. ISBN 978-0-8047-4908-4.
- Green, Arthur (2004). Ehyeh: A Kabbalah for Tomorrow. Jewish Lights Publishing. ISBN 978-1-58023-213-5.
- Green, Arthur (2003). Seek My Face: A Jewish Mystical Theology. Jewish Lights Publishing. ISBN 978-1-58023-130-5.
- Green, Arthur (2012). These are the Words: A Vocabulary of Jewish Spiritual Life. Jewish Lights Publishing. ISBN 978-1-58023-494-8.
- Alter, Judah A. (2012). Language of truth: the torah commentary of the Sefat Emet. Translated by Green, Arthur. Jewish Publication Society. ISBN 978-0827609464.
- Green, Arthur (14 July 2014). Keter: The Crown of God in Early Jewish Mysticism. Princeton University Press. ISBN 978-1-4008-6460-7.
- Green, Arthur (5 September 2017). Your Word Is Fire: The Hasidic Masters on Contemplative Prayer (2nd ed.). Jewish Lights Pub. ISBN 978-1-68336-670-6.
- Green, Arthur (5 February 2016). Devotion and Commandment: The Faith of Abraham in the Hasidic Imagination. University of Pittsburgh Press. ISBN 978-0-8229-8122-0.
- Green, Arthur (1993). Your Word Is Fire: The Hasidic Masters on Contemplative Prayer (First paperback ed.). Woodstock: Jewish Lights Publishing. ISBN 1-879045-25-7.
- Green, Arthur (1 October 1989). Shabbat Eve: Friday Night Prayerbook (Kol Haneshamah). Reconstructionist Press. ISBN 978-0-935457-40-7.
- Green, Arthur, ed. (1987). Jewish Spirituality: From the sixteenth-century revival to the present. Crossroad Publishing Company. ISBN 978-0-8245-0763-3.
- Co-editor. Mysticism, Hermeneutics, and Religion: Studies in Judaism. SUNY Press, 1984.
- Nahum, Menahem (1982). Green, Arthur (ed.). Upright Practices; The Light of the Eyes. Paulist Press. ISBN 978-0-8091-2374-2.
- Green, Arthur (1979). Tormented Master: A Life of Rabbi Nahman of Bratslav. University of Alabama Press. ISBN 978-0-8173-6907-1.

== Sources ==
- Tirosh-Samuelson, Hava; Hughes, Aaron W., eds. (2015). Arthur Green: Hasidism for Tomorrow. Library of Contemporary Jewish Philosophers. Vol. 16. BRILL. ISBN 978-90-04-30842-8.
  - Chapter: Interview with Arthur Green by Hava Tirosh-Samuelson, pp. 191–256, doi:10.1163/9789004308428_007
  - Chapter: Arthur Green: An Intellectual Profile by Ariel Evan Mayse, pp. 1–52, doi:10.1163/9789004308428_002
