= Simeon bar Isaac =

11th century French rabbi

Rabbi Simeon bar Isaac bar Avon of Mainz (also known as Rabbi Shimon ben Yitzchak, Rabbi Simeon the Great, (Hebrew: שמעון בן יצחק; c. 950 - c. 1020) was a rabbi, kabbalist, scholar, and poet. He was a contemporary of Rabbi Gershom Me’or HaGolah. He is often referred to as “the Great” due to his vast knowledge in all areas of Torah.

== Life ==
Rabbi Simeon the Great hailed from one of the prominent Ashkenazi families. He was the grandson of Rabbi Avun the Great and studied under Rabbi Meshullam bar Kalonymus. In the book “Or Zarua,” it is mentioned that Rabbi Meshullam directed a legal matter to him, but Rabbi Simeon, due to his young age, declined to decide on it. He was likely a humble individual. His piyyutim (liturgical poems) often emphasize the virtue of humility.

In the memorial register of the Mainz community, it is noted that “Rabbi Simeon bar Isaac toiled for the communities and illuminated the eyes of the exiles with his piyyutim.”

According to folk legend, his son Elchanan was abducted at a young age and raised in a monastery. Later, he became Pope Andreas. Upon discovering his true identity, he abandoned Christianity and was eventually martyred by the Crusaders. However, this legend lacks clear sources, and the chronology does not align – the First Crusade occurred over seventy years after Rabbi Simeon's passing.

Among his students were Rabbi Yakar, the father of Rabbi Yaakov ben Yakar, and Rabbi Eliezer the Great, son of Yitzchak.

Rabbi Yechiel Heilprin cites an old book that Rabbi Simeon passed away three days before the decrees of 1096 (Takkanot Tittnach).

== Piyyutim ==
Rabbi Simeon laid the foundation for Ashkenazi piyyutim and was one of the few Ashkenazi poets who wrote extensively. Many of his piyyutim are included in the Ashkenazi prayer cycle, such as “Kedushataot” for Rosh Hashanah, Shavuot, and Shevi’i shel Pesach. Additionally, he composed numerous selichot (penitential prayers), some of which are recited during the month of Elul and the Ten Days of Repentance. His piyyutim were influenced by Ashkenazi mystical traditions.

For the High Holy Days, he authored “Melech Amon Ma’arach,” and the “Karov” section of the “Ametz Koach” piyyut, both recited during the second day of Rosh Hashanah. The “Karov” section includes the refrain “Shemo mi’Yisrael” ("His name is from Israel").
