= Petachiah of Regensburg =

German rabbi

Petachiah of Regensburg, also known as Petachiah ben Yakov, Moses Petachiah, and Petachiah of Ratisbon, was a German/Bohemian rabbi of the twelfth and early thirteenth centuries. At some point he left his place of birth, Regensburg in Bavaria, and settled in Prague. He is best known for the description he wrote to document his extensive travels during the late twelfth century throughout Eastern Europe, the Caucasus, and the Middle East. He visited places such as Poland, Russia, Syria, Armenia, Palestine, and Greece. His work was later published, apparently in an abridged form, in a travelogue that eventually became known under the title Travels of Rabbi Petachia of Ratisbon.

Petachiah was born in Regensburg, a city whose Jewish community was so renowned for its piety and learning that it was sometimes called the "Jewish Athens". He was the brother of Isaac ben Jacob ha-Lavan ("the White"), a renowned rabbi and Jewish jurist, chief rabbinical authority of the Jews of Prague in that period. During his childhood Petachiah was probably tutored by such scholars as Judah ben Samuel of Regensburg, a.k.a. Judah the Pious, who is also thought to have travelled with him for a time, and who is credited with compiling a report of Petachiah's journey. Petachiah entrusted Judah the Pious with his travel notes which were then turned into the aforementioned travelogue.

Petachiah also authored several glosses on the Talmud.

The dates of the travels described in his travelogue are uncertain, but are placed roughly between the years 1170 and 1187. He probably set out from Prague sometime between 1170 and 1180, and was certainly in Jerusalem prior to the 1187 Battle of Hattin, since he describes it as being under the control of the Latin Kingdom of Jerusalem. As Judah the Pious is supposed to have made the surviving manuscript copy of Petachiah's travelogue, the latter must have returned to Regensburg prior to that sage's death in 1217. Petachiah was recognised by sources as a merchant and it is thought that he, along with the other Jewish merchants of Regensburg, played a part in the development of a trade route that extended from Mainz to Kiev.

Some of Petachiah's travelogue is devoted to discussing the oppression of Jews and the struggles they often faced in Greece and other neighboring lands.

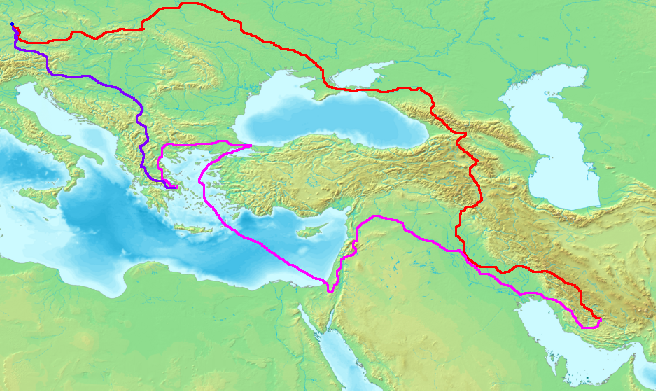
The approximate route of Petachiah's journeys.

Petachiah travelled east from Bohemia through Poland, Ruthenia, southern Ukraine (which he called Qedar), and Genoese Gazaria in Crimea. He describes the remnants of the Khazars and the early Crimean Karaite community. He then went south through the Kipchak khanates and the Caucasus into Armenia, sojourning for a while in Nisibis. From there he travelled to Mesopotamia, visiting Nineveh, Sura, Pumbedita, and Baghdad before moving on to Seljukid Iran. Turning westward, he journeyed up the Euphrates and into Syria, visiting Aleppo and Damascus. He travelled onward to the Kingdom of Jerusalem, visiting holy sites in the Galilee and Judea, whence he may have taken to the sea. The next place he describes is Greece. From there, presumably, he returned home via the Balkans.

The date of Petachiah's death is unknown, but could be around 1225.

== See also ==
- Chronology of European exploration of Asia
- Radhanites - medieval merchants, some of them Jewish
- Travelogues of Palestine
  - Benjamin of Tudela

== Sources ==
- New facsimile reprint of 1856 Benisch edition: Travels of Rabbi Petachia of Ratisbon. Gorgias historic travels in the cradle of civilization, vol. 31. Piscataway: Gorgias Press. 2012. ISBN 9781611439113. OCLC 712630312.
