= Joseph Dan =

Israeli scholar (1935–2022)

- יוסף דן
- Born: 1935; Budapest, Hungary
- Died: 23 July 2022 (aged 86–87)
- Awards: Israel Prize (1997)

Academic background
- Education: Hebrew University of Jerusalem

Academic work
- Discipline: Jewish mysticism
- Institutions: Hebrew University of Jerusalem
- Notable works: Gershom Scholem and the Mystical Dimension of Jewish History

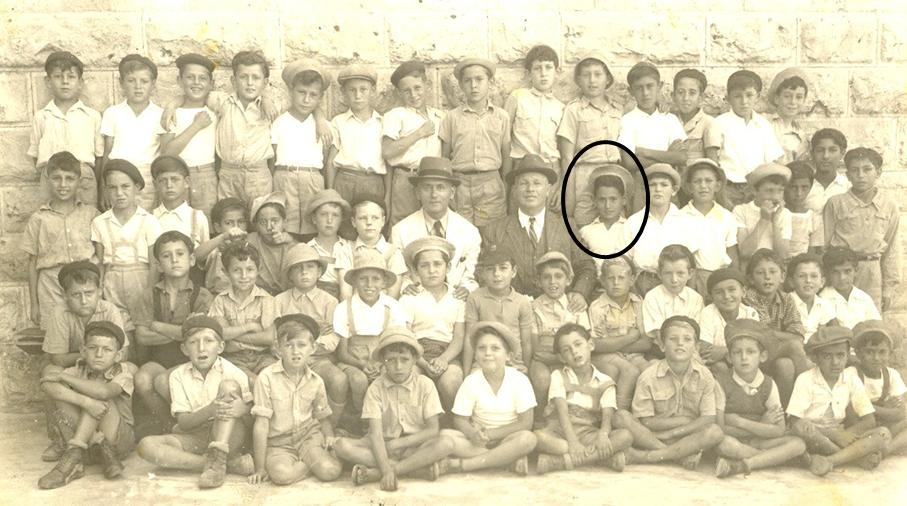
Dan in 3rd grade.

Joseph Dan (Hebrew: יוסף דן, 1935 – 23 July 2022) was an Israeli scholar of Jewish mysticism. He taught for over 40 years in the Department of Jewish Thought at the Hebrew University of Jerusalem. He was the first incumbent of the Gershom Scholem Chair in Jewish Mysticism at The Hebrew University.

== Biography ==
Dan was born in 1935 in Budapest, Hungary, from where, at the age of four, he and his family fled out of fear of Nazism, settling later in Jerusalem. All the biographical documents about Joseph Dan (including his own website) give his birthplace as Bratislava, Slovakia, a version created by his father to escape repatriation by the British government in British Mandate Palestine.

As a teenager Dan studied at the Hebrew University High School. Later, in the Hebrew University of Jerusalem, Dan began a double major in Assyriology and Jewish Thought. Under the influence of the revered teacher Gershom Scholem, he was attracted towards Jewish mysticism. He received his doctorate in 1964 under the guidance of Isaiah Tishby, his thesis titled The Speculative Basis of the Ethical Teachings of Chassidei Ashkenaz.

Having written more than 60 books, he had published by the time of his death the first thirteen volumes of a project titled "Toledot Torat Hasod Ha'ivrit" ("History of Hebraic Mysticism and Esotericism", Zalman Shazar Center, Jerusalem), which he described as "an attempt by one individual to write the entire history of Jewish mysticism: not some executive summary, but rather a full-blown academic survey abridgment for executives but with academic detail".

== Books ==
Dan, Joseph (1987). Gershom Scholem and the Mystical Dimension of Jewish History. New York University Press. ISBN 9780814720974.

== Awards ==
In 1997, Dan was awarded the Israel Prize, for Jewish thought.

== See also ==
- List of Israel Prize recipients
