= Aaron ben David Hayyun =

Aaron Ben David Hayyun
- Born: Aaron Ben David Hayyun
- Occupation(s): Rabbi, Kabbalist
- Known for: Kabbalist

Aaron Ben David Hayyun was a 17th-century Rabbi and Kabbalist. Together with David Yitzchaki and Jacob Molko, he served as a dayan in the Jerusalem rabbinate of Moshe Galante. A decision by Hayyun concerning the dispute between Mordecai ha-Levi, chief rabbi of Cairo, and Judah Habillo, rabbi of Alexandria, is published in the former's Darke No'am on the Chosen Mishpat section of the Shulchan Aruch (Nos. 47, 48). He was the author of a commentary on the Zohar, of which only a small part was published, under the title Machaneh Aharon (Leghorn, 1795).
