= Joseph De La Reina =

15th century Jewish mystic figure

Joseph De La Reina (c. 1418 - c. 1472) was a 15th Century Jewish mystical figure. According to Jewish legend, he attempted to hasten the messianic age and perished in the attempt. His fate was treated literarily by the Jewish literary writers Shai Agnon and Isaac Bashevis Singer. The tale of Joseph De La Reina's messianic epic is illustrated in a poem by Meir Wieners, published in Vienna in 1919.

== Legend ==
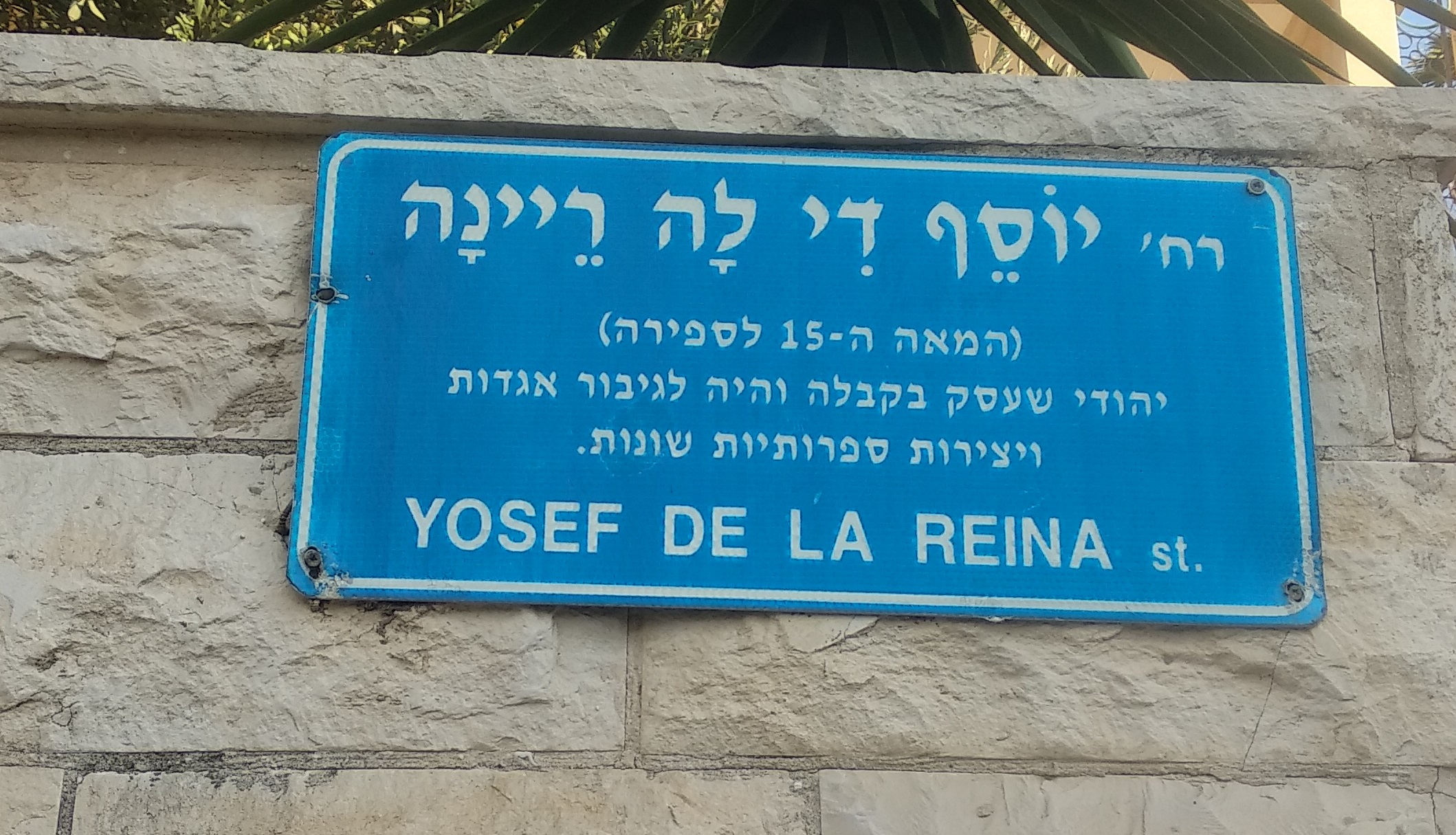
Joseph De La Reina street, Tel Aviv

The legend of De La Reina's attempt to force the early arrival of the messiah is used as a cautionary tale, warning of the dangers of Kabbalistic magic. In the legend, De La Reina tries to force the arrival of the messiah by capturing Asmodeus, the King of Demons, and his queen, Lilith. At first, De La Reina succeeds in placing the Asmodeus in chains, but then he becomes careless, allowing the King of Demons to outwit him. In the end, De La Reina despairs at his failure and embraces the demonic ways, becoming an heretic sorcerer in the city of Sidon. He takes Lilith as his lover, but also sends obedient spirits to kidnap the Queen of Greece in order to seduce her multiple nights, disguised as a dream. Ultimately, however, her husband realizes the ruse and summons his own magicians, who interrogate De La Reina's spirits and discover his identity. The king then sends for De La Reina to be captured, and the latter, realizing by this that evil had overtaken him, commits suicide throwing himself to the sea.

== In folklore and fiction ==
- The Tale of Joseph De La Reina (1899)
- The Tale of Joseph De La Reina (1905)
- The Last Confession of Joseph della Reina (2020) by Barak Bassman

== Gallery ==
Joseph De La Reina Gallery
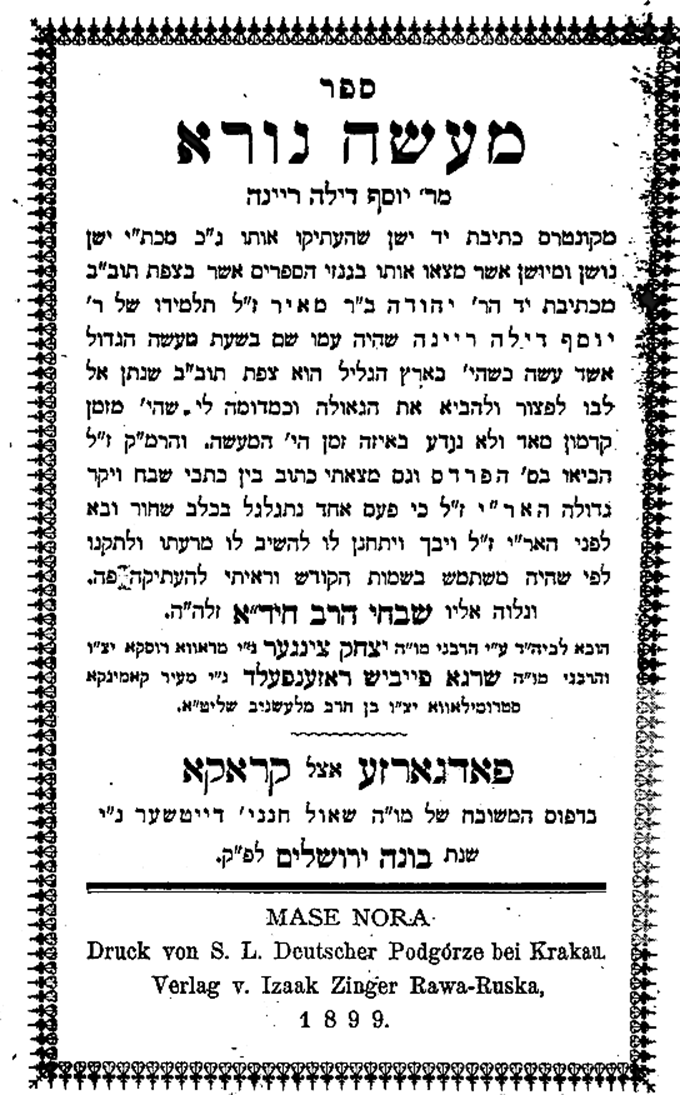
The Tale of Joseph De La Reina (1899)

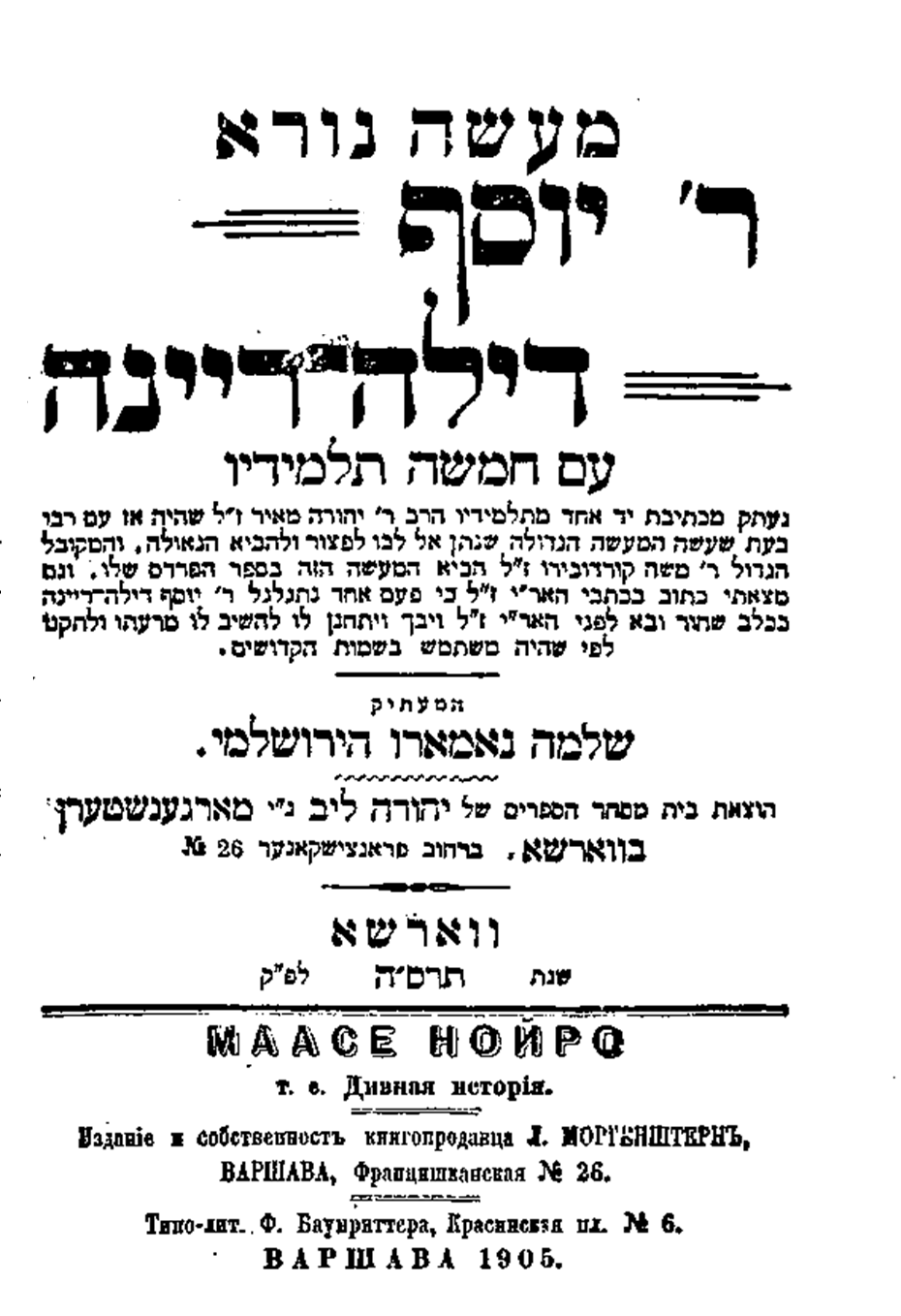
The Tale of Joseph De La Reina (1905)
