= Eleazar of Worms =

German rabbi

Eleazar ben Judah ben Kalonymus
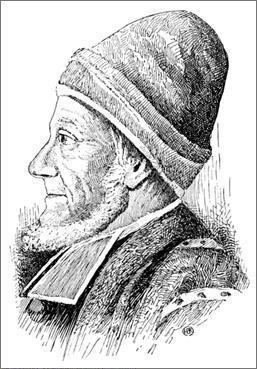
- Sketch/Engraving of Eleazar of Worms

Personal life
- Born: c. 1176 probably Mainz, Electorate of Mainz
- Died: 1238 Worms, Holy Roman Empire
- Spouse: Dulcea of Worms

Religious life
- Religion: Judaism

Eleazar of Worms (אלעזר מוורמייזא - also מגרמייזא of Garmiza or Garmisa) (c. 1176–1238), or Eleazar ben Judah ben Kalonymus, also sometimes known today as Eleazar Rokeach ("Eleazar the Perfumer" אלעזר רקח) from the title of his Book of the Perfumer (Sefer ha rokeah ספר הרקח)—where the numerical value of "Perfumer" (in Hebrew) is equal to Eleazar, was a prominent Kabbalist and halakhic authority, among the greatest of the Hasidei Ashkenaz and a disciple of Rabbi Judah the Pious.

He was the author of the Sefer ha-Rokeach (Rokeach in gematria = Eleazar), one of the Tosafists, and wrote many Kabbalistic works, most of which survive only in manuscript form. He served as a rabbi and judge in Worms, and instituted customs still observed in Ashkenazic communities today.

He was called "the Rokeach" after his book, though he was often mistakenly referred to as "Rabbi Eliezer of Germiza". Due to this confusion, he was sometimes wrongly identified as Eliezer the Great.

== Biography ==
Rabbi Eleazar was born around 1165 in Mainz to his father and teacher, Rabbi Judah ben Kalonymus of Mainz (known as the RIBaK), one of the greatest sages of his time. He traveled among centers of Torah in Germany and northern France. He learned Torah from his father and Kabbalah from his relative Rabbi Judah the Pious. He married the granddaughter of the RiBaN (Rabbi Yehuda ben Natan).

Among his prominent students was Rabbi Isaac ben Moses of Vienna, author of "Or Zarua". He signed the Enactments of SHU"M (Speyer, Worms, and Mainz). His date of death is uncertain, with estimates ranging from 1232 to 1242. He is buried in Worms.

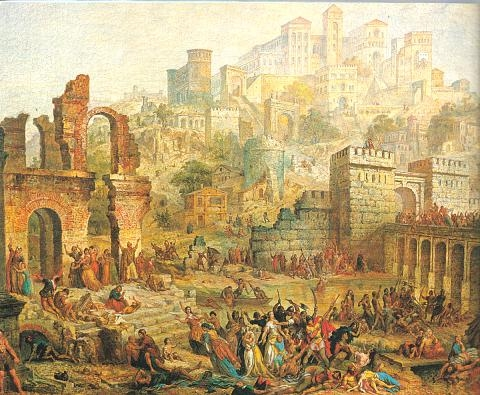
Massacre of the Jews of Metz during the First Crusade, by Auguste Migette.

He suffered greatly during attacks on the Jewish community, leading him to move from Mainz to Worms where he became rabbi. On the night of 22 Kislev 1196 (14 November), two intruders broke into his home during his study of the verse “And Jacob dwelt in safety,” wounded him and his son, and murdered his wife Dulcea, his 13-year-old daughter Belat, and his six-year-old daughter Hannah. He wrote:

...And they split open the head of my daughter Belat... and also my daughter Hannah, and she died... My wife the righteous woman got up and cried that we were being murdered. The villains struck her in the head, shoulder, and across her back, and she fell and died. I closed the door and we cried until help came from Heaven.

I remained destitute, in great poverty and suffering.

Yet, at the end of his lamentation, he justifies God’s judgment:

Woe unto me for my wife, woe for my daughters, I will mourn with a lamentation—how great are my sins.

The Judge is faithful who judged me,

In my sin and transgression He humbled me, I shall bless Him for every measure and sing His praise,

To Him I bow and prostrate myself.

Some scholars argue that parts of the lament were added later or copied incorrectly, as it refers to sons having died even though earlier he mentions that his surviving son was treated by his wife and lived.

One of the attackers was apprehended a week later, brought to justice, and executed. Following these events, Rabbi Eleazar focused on composing his Sefer ha-Rokeach and teaching via writing, as direct instruction had become difficult.

Eleazar developed a vigorous activity in many directions. On the one hand, he was a Talmudist of vast erudition, a liturgist gifted with a clear and easy style, and an astronomer, and was well versed in the sciences open to the Jews of Germany at that time. At the same time, he was an adventurous mystic who experienced visions, seeing legions of angels and demons. He exerted himself to spread mystical systems which went far beyond the conceptions of the classical authors of Jewish esoterica. In his mystical works he developed and gave a new impulse to the mysticism associated with the letters of the alphabet. By the gematria and notarikon systems of interpretation found in the Talmud, Eleazar invented new combinations by which miracles could be performed. The haggadic anthropomorphism which he had combated in his earlier works (Ha-Roḳeaḥ, Sha'are ha-Sod weha-Yiḥud) occupied later the foremost place in his mystical writings. Eleazar's great merit therefore lies not only in his new mystical system, but also in his ethical works. In these he shows greatness of soul and a piety bordering upon asceticism. Though so severely tried by fate, he inculcates cheerfulness, patience, and love for humanity.

Unlike Rabbi Judah the Pious, he signed his writings by name (usually as "the small one"). He was the first to do so.

Rabbi David Gans dated his death to 1238, and many scholars followed him. However, Ephraim Elimelech Urbach noted that Rabbi Eleazar is cited as deceased in works from 1232 and 1234, suggesting an earlier death. Yet, a signature by him exists from 1224, so his death likely occurred between these years. He is buried in the Old Cemetery in Worms.

== Sefer ha-Rokeach ==
His main work, "Sefer ha-Rokeach", is a halakhic text including legal rulings, customs, and their reasons according to the Tosafist tradition. It combines pilpul, halakhic conclusions, ethical insights, and many gematriot.

He taught that the reward for mitzvot depends on one’s struggle. A mitzvah that is difficult to perform earns more reward than "a hundred mitzvot performed easily."

The book frequently references Kiddush Hashem and reasons that if a person would die for his faith, he can surely resist lesser sins.

Another halakhic work is "36 Sha'arim" on the laws of shechita and treifot.

=== Joy in worship ===
Rabbi Eleazar praised serving God with joy, quoting from the Torah on the verse: "Because you did not serve the Lord with joy and gladness of heart..." He wrote:

One should always think how to do God's will. Pleasures with one’s wife and children are insignificant compared to loving the Creator... Even the satisfaction of a man uniting with a woman after a long separation is as nothing compared to the joy of doing God’s will.

=== Repentance ===
He emphasized repentance from sexual sin. Following the Sefer Hasidim, he categorized levels of repentance including "Teshuvat HaBa’ah"—returning to the scene of sin but resisting. He also supported ascetic forms of repentance—painful self-afflictions proportionate to the pleasure derived from sin, known as "Teshuvat HaMishkal".

Joseph Dan argued this elite form of teshuva was ideal in Ashkenazi Hasidism, though dangerous for most people.

=== Kabbalistic Thought ===
He wrote many Kabbalistic works, rich in gematria. Rabbi Tzvi Elimelech of Dinov in the Bnei Yissaschar emphasized that the Rokeach’s teachings were from Elijah the Prophet.

His concept of "Kavod" as an intermediary, non-created emanation of God, was adapted cautiously from Saadia Gaon and his teacher Rabbi Judah the Pious.

=== Halakhic customs ===
Rabbi Eleazar instituted several customs, including:

- Taking three steps backward before reciting "Hashem, open my lips" before the Amidah.
- Responding "Baruch Hu u’Varuch Shemo" after the zimun in Birkat Hamazon.
- Reciting the verse "He wraps Himself in light as a garment..." when examining tzitzit.
- Substitute prayers for Kaddish and "Barchu" if not heard in public.
- Not saying Tachanun during the month of Nisan.

The earliest source for the kitniyot prohibition on Passover is found in his Pesach derasha.

== Works ==
=== Ethical works ===
- Ha-Roḳeaḥ, ("The Perfumer"), a halachic guide to ethics and Jewish Law for the common reader. The title derives from the numerical value of the word רקח, which corresponds to that of אלעזר. The book is divided into 497 paragraphs containing halachot and ethics; first published at Fano, 1505.
- Adderet ha-Shem, still extant in manuscript in the Vatican Library.
- Moreh Ḥaṭṭa'im, or Seder ha-Kapparot, on penitence and confession of sin, first published at Venice, 1543. This work, which is included in the Hilkot Teshubah of the Ha-Roḳeaḥ, has been reproduced many times under various titles. It appeared under the title Darke Teshubah at the end of the responsa of Meir of Rothenburg in the Prague edition; as Inyane Teshubah, or Seder Teshubah, in the Sephardic ritual of 1584; as Yesod Teshubah, with additions by Isaac ben Moses Elles, first published in 1583; as Yore Ḥaṭṭa'im ba-Derek; and as Sefer ha-Kapparot. The title adopted here is the same as that given in the Kol Bo, in which the work was reproduced.
- Sefer ha-Ḥayyim, treating of the unity of God, of the soul and its attributes, and of the three stages (recognized by the ancients as "plant, animal, and intellectual") in man's life.
- Sha'are ha-Sod ha-Yiḥud weha-Emunah, a treatise on the unity and incorporeality of God, combating the anthropomorphism of the Aggadah (published by Adolf Jellinek in the Kokabe Yiẓḥaḳ collection [xxvii.].
- Kether Shem Tov. The Crown Of The Good Name, by Avraham ben Alexander of Cologne, disciple of Eleazar Ben Yehudah of Worms: Ethical-Kabbalist book.

=== Pietistic works ===
- Yir'at El, still extant in manuscript in the Vatican Library, containing mystical commentaries on Psalm 67, on the Menorah, and on Sefirat ha-Omer. In 2001 this work was published as part of the book דרוש המלבוש והצמצום.
- Sefer ha-Kabod, mystical explanations of various Biblical passages (Adolf Neubauer, Cat. Bodl. Hebr. MSS. No. 1566, 1).
- Yayin ha-Reḳaḥ, mystical commentaries on the Five Megillot. Those on Book of Ruth and the Song of Songs were published at Lublin, 1608.
- A commentary on Psalm 145. (MS. De Rossi No. 1138).
- A commentary on the prayers mentioned by Joseph Solomon Delmedigo in his Maẓref la-Ḥokmah (p. 14b). Printed by Hirshler.
- Ta'ame we-Sodot ha-Tefillah (Neubauer, ib. No.1575.)
- Perush 'al Sefer Yeẓirah, a commentary on the Sefer Yetzirah, being extracts from Shabbethai Donnolo's commentary. Fragments of this work were first published at Mantua in 1562, later in several other places; a complete edition was printed at Przemyśl, 1883.
- Midrash we-Perush ʿal ha-Torah, mystical commentary on the Torah mentioned by Chaim Yosef David Azulai, recently printed by klugman.
- Sha'are Binah, in which, interpreting Biblical verses by the system of gemaṭriyyot, he shows the origin of many aggadot of the Talmud. This work is frequently quoted by Solomon Alkabetz, in his Manot ha-Lewi.
- Shi'ur Qomah, a commentary on the Shi'ur Qomah, the Pirqe de-Rabbi Yishma'el, and Merkabah mysticism (MS. Michael).
- Sefer ha-Ḥokmah, mystical treatise on the various names of God and angels, and on the seventy-three 'Gates of the Torah'.
- Sefer ha-Shem, mystical dissertations on the names of twenty-two letters, with a table of permutations (Neubauer, ib. No. 1569, 4).
- Eser Shemot, commentary on the ten names of God (MS. Michael, No. 175).
- A commentary on the piyyuṭ "Ha-Oḥez."
- Six small cabalistic treatises entitled Sod ha-Ziwwug, Sefer ha-Ne'elam, Sefer Mal'akim, Sefer Tagim, Sefer Pesaq, and Sefer ha-Qolot, all of which are still extant in manuscript (Neubauer, ib. 1566).
- Liqquṭim, mystical fragments, mentioned by Menahem Recanati.
- Sode Raza, a treatise on the mysteries of the "Merkabah." Part of this work was published at Amsterdam in 1701, under the title Sefer Razi'el ha-Gadol. In the introduction the editor says that he decided to publish this book after having seen that the greater part of it had been produced in French under the title Images des Lettres de l'Alphabet.

In addition to these works, Eleazar wrote tosafot to many Talmudic treatises, referred to by Bezalel Ashkenazi in his Shiṭṭah Mequbbeṣet; a commentary on "Sheqalim" in the Jerusalem Talmud, cited by Asher ben Jehiel in his commentary to that treatise in the Babylonian Talmud; thirty-six chapters on the examination of ritually slaughtered animals (MS. Michael No. 307). Leopold Zunz enumerates fifty-five liturgical poems and dirges composed by Eleazar and occurring in the Ashkenazic maḥzorim, qinnot, and seliḥot.

For an extensive list of his attributed works, including halakhic, kabbalistic, liturgical, and ethical texts, see the Hebrew article or consult:

- Israel Kammerer, Rabbeinu Eleazar of Worms, the Rokeach, Rzeszow 1930.
- Avigdor Aptowitzer, Introduction to Ra'avyah, Jerusalem 1938, pp. 316–318.
- Encyclopaedia Hebraica, Vol. 3, Jerusalem 1953, pp. 722–724.
- Joseph Dan, Hasidei Ashkenaz in Jewish Thought, Open University Press.
- Ephraim Urbach, Ba'alei ha-Tosafot, Jerusalem: Bialik Institute, 1976, pp. 388–411.

== Descendants ==
Among his descendants is Rabbi Elazar Rokeach of Amsterdam, author of Maaseh Rokeach, founder of the Rokeach rabbinic dynasty. Ephraim Zalman Margolies, genealogist and halakhist, also claimed descent and served as a reference point for many rabbinic lineages in Central and Eastern Europe.
