= Sefer Hasidim =

Text attributed to Judah ben Samuel

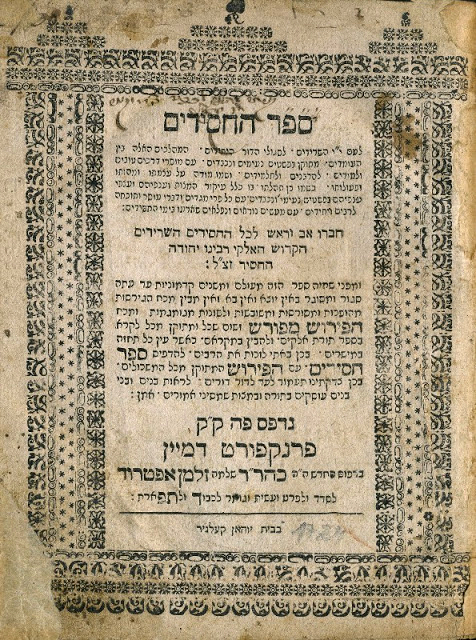
- Frankfurt, 1724 edition
- Author: Judah ben Samuel of Regensburg
- Language: Hebrew
- Subject: Teachings of the Ashkenazi Hasidim
- Genre: Non-fiction
- Media type: Print

The Sefer Hasidim or Sefer Chassidim (Hebrew: ספר חסידים, Book of the Pious) is a text attributed to Judah ben Samuel of Regensburg (died 1217), a foundation work of the teachings of the Ashkenazi Hasidim. It offers an account of the day-to-day religious life of Rabbinic Jews in medieval Germany and their customs, beliefs, and traditions. It presents the combined teachings of the three leaders of German Hasidism during the 12th and 13th centuries: Samuel of Speyer, Judah ben Samuel of Regensburg (his son), and Eleazar of Worms.

== Contents ==
The book contains ethical, ascetic, and mystical teachings, intermingled with elements of German popular belief. It discusses ethics and how they relate to everyday Jewish life, dealing with a variety of topics including piety (heading, Shemuel; so-called Sefer HaYir'ah); (§§ 14–26), reward and punishment, penitence, the hereafter, etc. (heading, Sefer HaḤasidim; so-called Sefer Teshuvah); (§§ 27–489), authorship of the book, pride, the hereafter and retribution, penitence and sinful desires, fasting and fast-days, suspicion, public mortification, martyrdom, etc. (heading, Zeh Sefer ha-Ḥasidim); (§§ 490–638), the Sabbath; (§§ 639–746), tefillin, ẓiẓit, mezuzot, books; (§§ 747–856), the study of the Law; (§§ 857–929), charity; (§§ 930–970), reverence for parents; (§§ 971–1386), piety, worship of God, prayer, visiting the sick, etc.; (§§ 1387–1426), excommunication and oaths; the final paragraphs repeat and amplify upon matter previously discussed.

This text takes into consideration the specific circumstances of these ethical situations including the individual character qualities of the subject, historical and economic context, and the subjects relationship to other people, making it an extremely important text when it comes to everyday Jewish life in medieval Germany. It serves as a guide for how to handle life's common tasks and challenges. There is no other ethical Hebrew text that covers as many topics while retaining close attention to realistic detail as Sefer Hasidim. Sefer Hasidim even served as a final authority on the way of Jewish life for the for authors of Halakah after the 15th century.

It consists, according to the edition of Basel, of 1,172 paragraphs; according to the last edition, of 1,903. Chosen parts have been translated into German by Zunz. The Book of the Pious is an exceedingly rich source for the Kulturgeschichte of the Jews in the Middle Ages.

== Authorship and history ==
Sefer Hasidim is not a uniform work, nor is it the product of one author. It appears that Judah HaHasid most likely was not the sole author of the Sefer Hasidim. It has been said that Samuel he-Ḥasid is the author of the first 26 sections. In its present form the book contains, according to Güdemann, three revisions of the same original work, of which Judah is undoubtedly the author; and both the contents and language of the book indicate that it originated in Germany. Important additions were made also by Judah's pupil Eleazar Roḳeaḥ, for which reason the authorship of the whole work has sometimes been ascribed to him. As collectors and copyists used varying recensions, sometimes the same passage occurs two or three times in different parts of the Sefer Ḥasidim. Some fragments of other books are inserted. This Hebrew book originated between the late 12th and early 13th centuries in the Rhineland, shortly after the Second Crusade. After this time, it circulated widely. It influenced the distinctive religious practices and Hebrew literary style of Jews in Ashkenaz and also shaped the discourse about Jewish ethics in medieval Europe and beyond.

The book has been printed many times since 1538.

According to Ivan Marcus, no original text of the Sefer Hasidim ever existed. It is therefore no surprise, then, that thirty-seven manuscripts that include texts from the Sefer Hasidim have been identified. Seventeen of these manuscripts are available online. Some manuscripts are more extensive than others. Two versions of the book are best known: one printed in Bologna and another that was found in Parma. An edition by Jehuda Wistinetzki based on the most complete source, the Parma manuscript, was published by the Mekitzei Nirdamim Society in 1891 and reprinted in 1955. Recently Otzar haPoskim Institute has published an elaborate version with numerous commentaries.

Some studies address subjects included within Sefer Hasidim. These include the subject of Jewish travel, and the attitude toward music. Entertainment and socializing especially among young people has been denigrated by some significant works of Jewish scholarship and law (including Sefer Hasidim and Shulkhan Arukh) as frivolity and a distraction from the Torah.

== Commentaries on Sefer Hasidim ==
- Brit Olam by Chaim Yosef David Azulai, with additions Shomer ha-Brit
- Mishnat Chassidim by Saadia Helvona
- Mekor Chesed by Reuben Margolies (1924, printed in the Mossad Harav Kook edition)
- Mishnat Avraham by Avraham Aharon Price (1955, Mikitzei Nirdamim edition)
