= Neo-Hasidism =

Eclectic approach to Hasidic Judaism

Neo-Hasidism, also Neo-Chassidut or Neo-Chassidus, (Note: Sometimes rendered un-hyphenated; i.e. "Neochassidus") is an approach to Judaism in which aspects of Hasidic Judaism are incorporated into the religious and spiritual practice of Jewish traditions that do not fall into conventional Hasidism. Alternatively, neo-Hasidism can describe Hasidic Judaism as it is adopted by non-Haredi Jews. Over the 20th century, neo-Hasidism was popularized by the works of writers such as Hillel Zeitlin, Martin Buber, Abraham Joshua Heschel, Zalman Schachter-Shalomi, and Arthur Green.

Neo-Hasidism is not a denomination of Judaism but rather an approach to Judaism whose adherents can be found across every movement and minhag — Orthodox and not.

In the 1970s and 1980s, a similar movement amongst baalei teshuva—within Haredi Judaism—was observed in the US, influenced by Shlomo Carlebach, Aryeh Kaplan, Zvi Aryeh Rosenfeld and others, and reflecting the contemporary counterculture movement. To some extent, it has persisted as the Carlebach minyan and the Breslov movement.

== Early 20th century ==
Martin Buber helped initiate interest in Hasidism among modernized Jews through a series of books he wrote in the first decades of the 20th century, such as Tales of the Hasidim and the Legend of the Baal Shem Tov. In these books, Buber focused on the role of storytelling and the charisma of early Hasidic masters as a vehicle for personal spirituality. As such, these books represent one aspect of Buber's larger project of creating a new form of personalistic, existential religiosity. Buber came under considerable criticism, especially from younger contemporary Gershom Scholem, for having interpreted Hasidism in an eccentric way that misrepresented Hasidic belief and literature. Nevertheless, Buber's sympathetic treatment of Hasidism proved attractive to many and started the 20th-century romance between an idealized Hasidism and non-Orthodox Jews.

== Post-World War II ==
After World War II, some surviving Hasidic communities from Europe relocated to America, allowing American Jews to experience their practices and beliefs directly. While most communities remained insular, Chabad and Breslover Hasidim adopted an outreach approach to engage more Jews in the Hasidic way of life.

Equally important was Abraham Joshua Heschel, a Holocaust refugee and scion of Hasidic royalty, who began his academic career in America with a life-saving but difficult wartime stint at Hebrew Union College. In 1946, he moved to the Jewish Theological Seminary of America, the intellectual center for Conservative Judaism. There, he still found himself marginalized for his Hasidic interests and customs, yet he surrounded himself with a small circle of devoted students (and eventual congregational rabbis) drawn to his mystically flavored phenomenology. As the 1960s began, Heschel was achieving increasing recognition as a theologian of stature with the publication of his books God in Search of Man and The Prophets. With that fame came an interest in his Hasidic roots and their role in his teachings. His social activism in the 1960s and 1970s further endeared him to many young Jews.

== 1960s onward ==
Several of Heschel's students at JTS during the turbulent 1960s and early 1970s eventually became involved in the embryonic Havurah movement, a loosely defined project of creating an alternative, informal type of Jewish community first proposed by Reform theologian Jakob Josef Petuchowski in the 1960s. While the movement spanned a broad spectrum of spiritual proclivities, some Jews in the founding circles, like Arthur Waskow, Arthur Green, and Michael Lerner, under the combined influence of Heschel and Schachter-Shalomi, took up the project of further exploring Hasidism and recasting it in an American idiom. Havurat Shalom, the flagship of this experimental quasi-communal movement, which was started jointly by Green and Schachter-Shalomi in Boston, produced the greatest artifact of Havurah Judaism, the Jewish Catalog series, a set of three books devoted to "do-it-yourself" Judaism, written with a healthy dose of information and enthusiasm for things Hasidic. Kabbalah also influenced Havurah communities, which Hasidism influenced.

These future neo-Hasids focused on selected attractive aspects of traditional Hasidism while rejecting teachings they found incompatible with modern egalitarian commitments, such as Hasidism's attitudes toward women, sexuality, and non-Jews. A few of these devotees, like Waskow and Lerner, became writers of note and public square intellectuals in the Jewish community and in the Jewish Renewal movement. Others, such as Green and Lawrence Fine, became leading scholars in the Jewish academic world, bringing an appreciation of Hasidism and an interest in adapting its ideas and customs to contemporary mores and life.

Through books like Tormented Master, The Language of Truth and Your Word Is Fire, Arthur Green (and others) made Hasidism both more accessible and compelling for Jews seeking personal spirituality amidst the outwardly focused and sometimes spiritually dry world of the formal American Jewish community. Among the liberal movements, the Reform community remained resistant to this trend for a longer period, but a few rabbis, such as Herbert Weiner and Lawrence Kushner, also started translating Hasidism into a Reform idiom, expanding its influence.

This overlapping of amorphous interest in Hasidism among academics, seekers, religious functionaries, intellectuals, "alternative" rabbis, and teachers has led to the coining of the term "Neo-Hasidism (NH)."

A few formalized groups and institutions, such as the P'nai Or congregation in Philadelphia, Pennsylvania, Elat Chayyim Retreat Center in Falls Village, Connecticut, and Central Reform Congregation in Saint Louis, Missouri, are substantially influenced by NH. NH also enjoyed a period of pre-eminence at the Reconstructionist Rabbinical Seminary (RRC) during Arthur Green's tenure there as dean.

== In Modern Orthodoxy ==
In the past several years, many in modern-Orthodoxy began exploring the texts and way of life of Chasidic masters. Most notable are Chabad works (such as the Tanya) and the writings of Rabbi Nachman of Breslov. Rabbi Moshe Weinberger, founding rabbi of Congregation Aish Kodesh in Woodmere, New York, is widely considered the "senior spokesman" of the Neo-Hasidic movement in Modern Orthodoxy.

== Similarities and differences with Hasidism ==
By definition, neo-Hasidic Judaism has significant differences from Hasidic Judaism.

Hasidic Jews view their rebbe as a person who is literally in a state of devekut (communion) with God in a way that most people are not; that a rebbe (or tzaddik) has purged his heart of the Evil Inclination. Further, Hasidim compare their Rebbe with God, in that the tzaddik becomes a channel for the divine will.

“A tzadik is like the creator, he is unified in the lower and higher worlds.” Hillel Halevi of Paritch

“The will of God and the will of the tzadik are one“. Dov Ber of Mezeritch

In contrast, these beliefs are completely rejected by neo-Hasidism. Adherents of neo-Hasidic Judaism view their rabbis and prayer group leaders as people who are superior only in academic credentials - for instance, someone with rabbinic ordination and an academic record of studies in some topic (liturgy, rabbinic literature etc.) is respected as an academic. No human is considered to be more holy than any other. Neo-Hasidism aims to be more egalitarian.

Neo-Hasidim reject the Hasidic doctrine of bonding with the Tzadik (התקשרות לצדיקים); Hasidic Jews view their Rebbe as an intermediary between God and man (albeit in a functional and not an essential sense). Hasidic Jews seek to bind themselves to God by virtue of being bound to their rebbe. Such ideas are largely rejected by Jews outside of Hasidic Judaism, including by neo-Hasidism.

Neo-Hasidim reject the Hasidic doctrine of dynastic succession. In Hasidic communities, the son (or son-in-law) of a Rebbe usually becomes the next rebbe. In contrast, this dynastic succession is rejected by neo-Hasidim.

In Hasidic Judaism, there are many mitzvot, including wearing tallitot, tefillin, and writing a mezuzah scroll, done by only men. Neo-Hasidism allows women to do some or all of these. In non-Orthodox neo-Hasidism, women are equal to men in every way: they can count in a minyan and be a shaliach tzibbur. In Modern Orthodox neo-Hasidic groups, women may not count in a minyan or be a shaliach tzibbur, in alignment with Orthodox Jewish law.

== See also ==
- Jewish denominations
- Jewish Renewal
- Arthur Green
- Gershom Scholem (Began 20th-century academic discipline to study Jewish mysticism)
- Elie Wiesel (Neo-Hasidic literature and mystical theodicy of silence)
- Jewish philosophy (Buber and Heschel articulate theology in terms of Jewish existentialism)
- Kabbalah § Neo-Hasidic
- Carlebach minyan
- Diaspora Yeshiva
- Rabbinical Seminary International
- Yeshiva Sulam Yaakov
- Chabakuk Judaism
