= Judah ben Samuel of Regensburg =

German Jewish mystic (1150–1217)

Judah ben Samuel of Regensburg Judah the Pious

Personal life
- Born: Yehuda ben Shmuel; 1150 Speyer, Bishopric of Speyer
- Died: 22 February 1217 (aged 66–67) Regensburg, Bavaria
- Children: Moses Zaltman
- Parent: Shmuel (father)

Religious life
- Religion: Judaism

Judah ben Samuel of Regensburg (1150 – 22 February 1217), also called Yehuda HeHasid or Judah the Pious in Hebrew, was a leader of the Ashkenazi Hasidim a movement of Jewish mysticism in Germany (not to be confused with the 18th-century Hasidic Judaism founded by the Baal Shem Tov).

Judah was born in 1150 in the small town of Speyer, now in the Rhineland-Palatinate, Germany, but later settled in Regensburg, now in Bavaria, in 1195. He wrote much of Sefer Hasidim ("Book of the Pious"), as well as a work about Gematria and Sefer Hakavod (Book of Glory); the latter has been lost and is only known by quotations that other authors have made from it. His most prominent students were Elazar Rokeach, Isaac ben Moses of Vienna author of Or Zarua and perhaps also Moses ben Jacob of Coucy according to Chaim Yosef David Azulai.

== Biography ==
Judah was descended from an old family of kabbalists from Northern Italy that had settled in Germany. His grandfather Kalonymus ben Isaac the Elder was a scholar and parnas in Speyer (died 1126). His father Samuel, also called HeHasid "the Pious", HaKadosh "the Holy", and HaNabi "the Prophet", was president of a bet midrash in Speyer, and from him Judah, together with his brother Abraham, received his early instruction. Samuel died while Judah was still young. About 1195 he left Speyer and settled in Regensburg (Ratisbon), on account of an "accident" – most probably a ritual murder accusation Feb. 13 1195 (see e.g. Israel Yuval: Two Nations in Your Womb (2006) p. 171) and the following persecution experienced by the Jews of Speyer.

He founded a yeshiva in Regensburg and secured many pupils. Among those who became famous were Eleazar of Worms, author of the Roqeaḥ; Isaac ben Moses of Vienna, author of Or Zarua; and Baruch ben Samuel of Mainz, author of Sefer ha-Ḥokmah. Eleazar applies to his teacher in several passages terms expressive of the highest esteem, such as "father of wisdom".

Judah left one son, Moses Zaltman, author of a commentary on several parts of the Bible. Some scholars think that this Moses Zaltman, Zlatman or Blatman was in reality Rabbi Moses ben Yoel of Regensburg. It has been erroneously supposed that Judah had two other sons, Aaron and David.

He died on Shabbat Zachor. According to MS Guenzburg 109 f. 73r, "he was buried in the holy city of Regensburg and I, [Menahem] Ullendorf ben Naftali, visited his grave on Tisha b'Av of [1471] and signed my name upon his tombstone."

Judah he-Ḥasid has often been confused with Judah ben Isaac Messer Leon of Paris, who is also called HeḤasid, which is nothing but an honorable title usual in his age. The fact that French words are to be found in the Book of the Pious and that it reflects French conditions caused Grätz also to attribute its authorship to Judah Sir Leon HeḤasid. But the reasons given by Grätz are not tenable.

=== Legends of his life ===
Legend describes Judah as an excellent bowman who at the age of eighteen was ignorant of the daily prayers. When, however, enlightenment suddenly came upon him he performed many miracles. He restored fertility to a young married woman. The prophet Elijah is said to have partaken of his Seder meal and to have been seen by him in a synagogue. He miraculously prevented a Jewish child from being baptized and knew the exact year of Israel's redemption. He maintained communications with the Bishop of Salzburg and acted as seer for the Duke of Regensburg.

== Writings ==
It is rather difficult to determine in what the new and important departure ascribed to him by legend consisted, since the obscurity spread over his works is as impenetrable as that surrounding his life. We know little of his study of the Talmud. Occasionally a halakhic writing, Gan Bosem, is quoted as his; a decision of his is found in Samson ben Zadok's Sefer Tašbaṣ § 219, in Isaac ben Moses of Vienna's Or Zarua, and in Meïr Rothenburg's collection of responsa; and he is found in correspondence with celebrated halakhists of his age.

His commentary on the Torah, written down by his pupils after his lectures, was known only by citations in later commentaries. Yet, in 1975, Rabbi I. S. Langa has published Judah's commentary on the Pentateuch, but he was forced to publish a second censored edition, due to claims about interpolations and modifications made in the composition of the Torah (on Gen. 48:20; Lev. 2:13; Deu. 2:8). Eran Viezel has argued that these claims were made by R. Moshe Zaltman, the son of R. Judah he-Hasid, rather than Judah himself.

=== Liturgy ===
He composed liturgical songs, but the authenticity of those attributed to him is uncertain. As regards his Shir Hayichud (seven parts; the eighth is called Shir HaKavod), printed in Tiengen, 1560, there is very great divergence of opinion, and the question of its authorship is still undecided. According to Zunz, it seems to be genuine, as do also his prayer Yechabeh Dim`ati and his selicha Gadol Yichudcha Elohim Beyisrael. More probably, according to the sources, his father, or a certain Samuel Ḥazzan, who died as a martyr at Erfurt in 1121, composed the Shir ha-Yiḥud, and Judah himself wrote a commentary on it. Several prayers are erroneously attributed to Judah; e.g., Zunz wrongly ascribes to him the alphabetical teḥinnah Ezkera Yom Moti. He wrote also commentaries on several parts of the daily prayers and on the Maḥzor.

Judah collected the notes of travel of his fellow citizen Petachiah of Regensburg, though incompletely and without any order. His chief literary work was an ethical and mystical one. Undoubtedly genuine is his Sefer HaKavod, which is mentioned by his pupils. Although there is some doubt, it is generally accepted that the person who wrote ethical will Tzava'at Rabbi Yehudah Hechasid, printed in 1583 and translated into Judæo-German, Prague, seventeenth to eighteenth century was Harav Yehuda HeChasid Shapiro. This testament contained regulations regarding the dead (§§ 1-15), the building of houses (§§ 16-21), matrimony (§§ 22-32), prohibited marriages between stepbrothers and stepsisters and between cousins, and various customs and superstitious prescriptions (§§ 33-end).

He was also a student, of one of the authors of Tosafot, and was the teacher of Meir of Rothenburg. He also taught Isaac ben Moses of Vienna (author of the Or Zarua) and Moses ben Jacob of Coucy (author of the Semag). Some say all the items in the will were written through Holy Spirit. Some commentaries go so far as to say that none of the Biblical prophets came to his level. Many people are very careful with all the items listed in the will. Some say one who is not careful with the items in the tzavaah will have to give a din and heshbon (account). The reason why the will is generally not brought in the Shulchan Aruch is because the dangers mentioned in it and the Gemara are real dangers, while the items in the will are not real dangers, but things which one must distance himself from.

There are also ascribed to Judah an astrological work, Gemaṭriot, handed down by his pupils and seen by Chaim Azulai, and Sefer ha-Ḥokhmah, on prayers and customs and the writing of scrolls of the Law.

=== Sefer Hasidim ===
The principal work with which Judah's name is connected is Sefer Hasidim. The book contains ethical, ascetic, and mystical teachings, intermingled with elements of German popular belief. Sefer Hasidim is not a uniform work, nor is it the product of one author. Parts of it have been attributed to Samuel of Speyer and Eleazar of Worms, as well as to Judah himself.

== Mysticism ==
The precise importance of Judah ben Samuel is somewhat difficult to determine. Side by side with the official, dogmatic religion of the Synagogue there has always existed a mysticism dealing more largely and more intimately with the personal relation of the individual to God, which at times was in opposition to the religion of the Synagogue. Judah's mysticism was in such a stage of opposition; he therefore undervalued the study of the Halakhah and indulged in marked departures from the accepted religious practises. He endeavored to deepen the feeling of devotion and piety and emphasized the importance of studying the Bible rather than studying the Talmud. He deals mystically with prayer, regarding it as more important than study. It was really he who introduced theosophy among the Jews of Germany. The occasional quotations from his Sefer HaKavod present the salient points of his views.

The conception of a personal relation to the Lord was long since felt by Jewish thinkers to be inconsistent with His spiritual nature. Judah and his school, therefore, though not the first ones, distinguished between the Divine Being (Etzem) and the Divine Majesty (Kavod). The Divine Being, called also Ḳedushshah, dwells in the west, invisible to men and angels. The Divine Being is superior to all human perception. When God reveals Himself to men and angels, He appears in the form of the Divine Majesty. The Divine Majesty, then, dwelling in the east and created out of divine fire, holds the divine throne, true to its nature of representing to human eyes the Divine Being. The throne is draped on the south, east, and north, while it is open to the west in order to allow the reflection of the Divine Being dwelling in the west to shine upon it. It is surrounded by the heavenly legions of angels, chanting to the glory of the Creator.

Lacking the philosophic training common among the Spanish Jews – although he was acquainted with Ibn Ezra, Saadia, some of the Karaites, and perhaps Maimonides – Judah did not reduce his mystic-theosophical theories to a system, and they are therefore difficult to survey. His intellectual importance is on the whole not clear. Zunz says of him: "To vindicate whatever is noble in human endeavors, and the highest aspirations of the Israelite, and to discover the inmost truths alluded to in the Sacred Books, seemed to be the ultimate purpose of a mind in which poetic, moral, and divine qualities were fused."
