= Timeline of the Hebrew prophets =

This is a timeline of the development of prophecy among the Jews in Judaism. All dates are given according to the Common Era, not the Hebrew calendar.

See also Jewish history which includes links to individual country histories.

== the Exodus ==
c.1450-1350 BC(?)
the Exodus from Egypt (prophecy of Moses, Aaron, and Miriam)

== the Land of Israel ==
c. 1300-1250 BC
Joshua leads the people
c. 1250 BC–c. 1025 BC
Biblical Judges lead the people. (prophecy of Deborah)

== During the Kingdom of Israel and Judah ==
c. 1025 BC–c. 1003 BC
King Saul, prophecy of Samuel,
c. 1003 BC–c. 963 BC
King David, prophecy of Nathan prophecy of Gad
c. 963 BC–c. 923 BC
King Solomon
c. 923 BC–c. 913 BC
King Rehoboam of Judah, prophecy of Shemaiah
c. 922 BC–c. 910 BC
King Jeroboam of Israel, prophecy of Ahijah
c. 913 BC–c. 910 BC
King Asa of Judah

prophecies of Elijah, Micaiah, and Elisha

c. 837 BC–c. 800 BC
King Joash of Judah

prophecy of Jonah during the time of Babylonian captivity, though dating of the book ranges from the 6th to the late 3rd century BC.

c. 796 BC–c. 768 BC
King Amaziah of Judah

prophecy of Amos, Hosea

c. 767 BC–c. 754 BC
King Uzziah of Judah
c. 740 BC–c. 700 BC
prophecy of Isaiah

prophecy of Micah

c. 722 BC
Kingdom of Israel falls to Neo-Assyrian Empire
c. 715 BC–c. 687 BC
King Hezekiah of Judah

prophecy of Joel(?) prophecy of Nahum

c. 648 BC– c. 609 BC
King Josiah of Judah

prophesy of Jeremiah

== Before and during Exile ==
c. 609 BC

King Jehoahaz of Judah 3 Months

c. 608 BC–c. 598 BC

King Jehoiakim of Judah

c. 598 BC–c. 597 BC

King Jeconiah of Judah

c. 597 BC–c. 520 BC

In Judea: prophecy of Zephaniah, Jeremiah, Obadiah, and Habakkuk In Babylon: prophecy of Ezekiel

== Post Exile ==
c. 530 BC
First view (and traditional one) is that Daniel was written immediately after the Babylonian exile ended and many Jews returned to Jerusalem to rebuild the temple. Daniel's prophetic visions revealed successive empires that would follow, one after the other as well as providing a backdrop of God's eternal, unshakeable kingdom continuing in spite of the earthly upheaval and power struggles. The scholarly view is that the "prophecy" of Daniel was written in the 2nd Century B.C. during the time of the Seleucid dynasty. Note that in Jewish scripture, Daniel is not considered a prophet and is not included among the prophetic books.
c. 520 BC–c. 411 BC
prophecy of Haggiah, Zechariah, Joel(?)

Return to the land under Persian rule, and writings of Ezra-Nehemiah Story of Esther

c. 433 BC [?]
prophecy of Malachi during the times of the Persian Empire

(535 BC: First portion of Ezra; 515 BC: Second portion of Ezra and Haggai and Zecharia; Joel possibly some time later; 474 BC: Esther; 450 BC: Remainder of Ezra, Nehemiah, and Malachi.)

c. 312 BC–c. 63 BC
Judah's subjugation under the Seleucid Empire

During this period Judah became the sovereign nation of Israel: The Maccabean Revolt 167 to 160 BC
