= Samuel of Speyer =

12th century Rabbi from Hasidei Ashkenaz

Samuel ben Kalonymus he-Hasid of Speyer (Hebrew: שמואל החסיד; 1120–1175), was a Tosafist, liturgical poet, and philosopher of the 12th century, surnamed also "the Prophet". He seems to have lived in Spain and in France. He was the first of the Chassidei Ashkenaz, and the father of Judah ben Samuel of Regensburg.

According to legend, he created a golem which accompanied him on his travels and served him, but could not speak.

== Works ==
He is quoted in the tosafot, and Rashbam in his commentary on Pesachim.

He the author of a commentary on the treatise Tamid, mentioned by Abraham b. David in his commentary thereon.

He may also be the author of a liturgical poem entitled Shir ha-Yiḥud, (Note: On the different opinions concerning the authorship of the Shir ha-Yiḥud see L. Dukes in Orient, Lit. vii., cols. 483, 484) divided into seven parts corresponding to the seven days of the week. This poem is a philosophical hymn on the unity of God, for which Ibn Gabirol's Keter Malkut served as the basis. Like the latter, Samuel he-Ḥasid describes God using negative theology, that is to say, from the point of view that God is not like man. The Hebrew, if not very poetical, is pure; but foreign words are used for the philosophical terms. The recitation of the poem was forbidden by Solomon Luria; but other rabbis, among whom was Samuel Judah Katzenellenbogen, who wrote a commentary on it, decided to the contrary.
