= Ashkenazi Hasidim =

Jewish mystical, ascetic movement in Germany during the 12th and 13th centuries

The Hasidim of Ashkenaz (Hebrew: חסידי אשכנז, trans. Hasidei Ashkenaz; "German Pietists") were a Jewish mystical, ascetic movement in the German Rhineland during the 12th and 13th centuries.

The movement is known for its strict asceticism and mystical doctrine who radically reimagined Jewish ethics, holding themselves accountable to din shamayim (an unwritten Law of Heaven) in addition to traditional halakha. Some posit that its theology fits into the general canon of Jewish mysticism. It certainly parallels other Jewish mysticism; however in other ways it was very original. The extent of the movement's influence and the nature of its community have been subjects of extensive academic debate. Significant research by scholars such as Gershom Scholem, Joseph Dan, and Ivan G. Marcus has explored whether the movement was a widespread social phenomenon or a literary ideal preserved in texts like Sefer Hasidim. Modern scholarship continues to examine its impact on medieval Jewish social life and various other areas.

== Prominent members ==
The leaders of the community of the Ashkenazi Hasidim movement were descended from the Kalonymos family of northern Italy, a family that had immigrated to Germany in the 10th century; and the Abun family of France, such as Abin ha-Gadol among others, according to the sacred books they wrote at the close of the 10th century.

The line of thought that developed into Ashkenazi Hasidicism traces its roots to the Babylonian Gaonic scholar Abu Aaron and extended to the three seminal thinkers of the late twelfth and early thirteenth centuries, Judah ben Samuel of Regensburg, Samuel of Speyer, and Eleazar of Worms. Judah of Regensburg was the foremost leader of the Ashkenazi Hasidim. His book Sefer Hasidim "Book of the Pious" is the most significant relic of this movement. He was born in 1150 in Speyer and died in 1217. He was a strong Talmudist and attended Tosafist schools. His experiences as a Tosafist may have contributed to his desperate plea to focus on the practical aspects of the Talmud, the Halakha. He was taught the Kabbala at a young age by his father, Samuel the Pious of Speyer.

Samuel the Pious is said to have contributed some of the sections in Sefer Hasidim, and as the father and teacher of Judah the Pious, he directly contributed to much of this movement's thought. He authored the Shir Hakavod "Song of the Glory", which poetically describes Ashkenazi Hasidic theology, namely, the presence of the divine glory. He also authored the Sefer Hayirah "Book of the Fear of God" and Sefer Hateshuva "Book of Repentance".

Eleazar of Worms was a leading Talmudist and Kabbalist in the 13th century and was the prime disciple of Judah the Pious. He is best known for his work, Sefer HaRokeah "Book of the Perfumer", a halakhic guide to ethics and halakha for the common reader. His prediction of the coming of the Messianic Age of 1226 and that it would come to fruition in 1240 spread far and wide in Jewish communities. He was the last major member attributed to this movement and died in 1230.

== Sefer Hasidim ==
Sefer Hasidim, by Rabbi Judah the Pious, is the most important work of the Chassidei Ashkenaz. The themes depicted within it most significantly portray the religious ideology of the Chassidei Ashkenaz. Sefer Hasidim contains over two thousand stories. Sefer Hasidim are told to individuals gathered around a leader and this leader was called a hasid bakhamor a Pietist Sage. The Pietist, as an individual but even more as a Sage, was existentially responsible for the transgressions of his fellows, indeed for the transgressions of Jewish society as a whole. Samuel's son Judah went farther and depicted him as the head of a sect.

Two versions of the Sefer Hasidim exist, the Bologna Edition and the Parma MS Edition, and a debate about which one represents an earlier version persists.

== Themes and theology ==
=== Retzon haborei ===
One of Ashkenazi Hasidism's most central concepts was the "will of the Creator" (retzon haborei), that is to say, those standards of thought and behavior which God requires from humans, which the true worshiper of God seeks to fulfill, but which are not fully described in the written and oral Torah. Despite their lack of formal legal definition, these standards can be deduced from other sources such as Biblical narrative. On this basis, the Hasidism called for numerous new guidelines, both ethical (e.g. humility, honesty, and equity) and ritual, which they called din shamayim ("Law of Heaven").

According to Sefer Hasidim, the laws of the Torah are insufficient to describe God's will for humans:

"We have not found it [the Torah] of ample strength" (Job 37:23): [The Torah] did not [fully] express the will of the creator, nor did it address itself to the needs of man.

Thus, Sefer Hasidim presents an abundance of novel directives, each one representing retzon haborei. In fact, Rabbi Judah the Pious stipulates in the introduction to the book that one of his primary goals in writing Sefer Hasidim was to make this hidden will of God accessible to those who wish to find it:

[This book] is written for those who fear God and are mindful of His name. There is a Hasid whose heart desires, out of love for his creator do His will, but he is unaware of all these things [i.e. demands]- which thing to avoid and how to execute profoundly the wish of the Creator... For this reason, the Sefer Hasidim was written so that all who fear God and those returning to their Creator with an undivided heart may read it and know and understand what is incumbent upon them to do and what they must avoid.

The quest to fulfill retzon haborei is not just a commendable, optional one; rather, it is a requisite aspect of proper divine service:

And we find in the Torah that anyone who was capable of understanding [a demand] even though he was not [explicitly] commanded is punished for not realizing [the requirement] on his own. As is said, “And Moses was angry with the officers of the army ... who had come from the service of the war. And he said to them, ‘Have you let all the women live?’” (Num 31:14–15). Why did they not reply, “You did not command us, for you did not tell us to kill the women”? But Moses knew that they were wise and perspicacious enough to infer [this command] on their own... For this reason I set myself to writing a book for the God-fearing, lest they be punished and think [it is] for no reason. Far be it from God to do such a thing! (Gen. 18:25) ... Therefore I have set forth this Book of Fear so that those who fear the word of God can take heed. “More than these, my son, must you take heed” (Eccl. 12:12).

Sefer Hasidim contains many instructions that illuminate this theme of searching beyond the revealed instructions of the written and oral Torah for retzon haborei. One example is the law of chelev. Even though the oral law states clearly that one is permitted to derive benefit from chelev, the Sefer Hasidim posits that if not for man's weaknesses it would have been forbidden, and thus a pious person is forbidden to derive benefit from it.

=== Kavod ===
Ashkenazi Hasidic theology contained some similarities to the theologies the early kabbalists and of Saadia Gaon.

Saadia, in his Book of Beliefs and Opinions (אמונות ודעות) grapples with the following conundrum: throughout the Tanakh, prophets frequently describe visions of God sitting on His heavenly throne, surrounded by the heavenly host. Since believing that God has perceivable, physical features is blasphemous for Saadia, he concludes that the visions do not portray God, but rather portray God's created glory. This glory is God's created messenger, his exalted angel, created to give the prophets something concrete to visualize.

The torat hakavod (Hebrew תורת הכבוד) of the Ashkenazi Hasidim echoes Saadia's theory, but with a fundamental difference. For the latter, the glory was not created by God, but emanated from God in a similar manner to the way that light emanates from the sun. What emerged is a tripartite system composed of God, the higher Kavod, and the lower Kavod. God is beyond human comprehension and impossible for man to relate to. The higher Kavod emanates from God, and is still very distant from man, but slightly more accessible. And finally, the lower Kavod is the element that man can access. It is at the lower Kavod that man can attempt to understand.

This description of God and His divine realm directly parallels the kabbalistic system of sefirot, with Ein Sof (Hebrew אין סוף) beyond knowledge on the top, and the ten sefirot emanating downward; the lower the sefira, the more relatable it becomes. Just as the unity of the sefirot is an indispensable concept in Kabbala, the inter-connectedness of the lower Kavod and higher Kavod is crucial for the Chassidei Ashkenaz. The lower Kavod is not separate from the higher Kavod but instead emanates from it.

As in Kabbala, there are many symbols and descriptions used to explain and refer to the Kavod. For example, in various Ashkenazi Hasidic works, the Kavod is referred to by the names of Demut Yakov Chakuk al Kisai HaKavod, Tiferet Yisrael, Kruv, Kisai Hakavod, Atara, Shin, Bas, and Sod.

Many of these references are present in Shir Hakavod by Rabbi Samuel the Pious, a poem written in praise of the Kavod.

=== Other themes ===
Their devotion were expressed in both esoteric and perfectionist ways. Their esoteric expression was in their dedication to prayer. They believed that you may rise spiritually toward communion with God through the knowledge of prayer.

As portrayed in Sefer Hasidim, the Hasid is assertive and in certain senses extreme in his efforts to impose his system upon his surroundings. The Hasid did not view his religious observance as merely admirable; he viewed it as the standard duties of any Jew. Therefore, integral to the Hasid's divine worship was an aspiration to positively influence others. In part, Sefer Hasidim is sated with praise for those who serve the public and equally filled with admonition for those who cause others to stumble. Acting for the common good became a leitmotif in Sefer Hasidim, and failure to take a public stand against wrongdoing is perceived as a grave sin. It was the Hasid's goal to enlighten those who needed enlightenment.

On the flip side, those who did not adhere to the "proper" lifestyle proscribed by Sefer Hasidim were constantly labeled as reshaim (wicked ones). The "wicked" or the "unrighteous ones" were not to be called to the Torah, be given honors in the services, blow the shofar, or serve as sandek. It is clear from Sefer Hasidim itself that this class of people was "wicked" simply from the perspective of the Hasidim. From the non-Hasid perspective, these often were scholars who make serious contributions to Halachic thought and give influential rulings on religious matters.

Other themes include penance, lilmod al menat lekayem (learn in order to fulfill), Jewish travel, and the attitude toward music.

According to Haim Soloveitchik, the Ashkenazi Hasidic movement was a backlash to the culture which accompanied some parts of the Tosafist movement, where the creation of new Torah insights was especially prized, and thus one could achieve social stature on the basis of intellectual accomplishments without corresponding character growth. In response, the Ashkenazi Hasidim formulated a code of behavior that emphasized extreme expressions of good character.

== Extent and influence ==
There has been much debate regarding the extent and influence of the movement in the Middle Ages and beyond.

Joseph Dan posits that Sefer Chassidim was an individual work by Rabbi Judah the Pious, not a "national work" of Ashkenazic Jewry. He concludes that the community depicted within Sefer Chassidim was merely a blueprint for a structure that was never built: Rabbi Judah's plans were never carried out, and the envisioned pious community never existed. Many proofs motivated this approach. First, there is no reference in any Ashkenazic literature to any of its particular ideas. Additionally, there is no external proof of existence for Pietistic communities. A controversial movement such as this one, which castigated much of the broader community, labeling them reshaim (wicked), would certainly have been referenced by contemporary literature.

However, others such as Isaiah Tishby maintain that Sefer Chassidim is an "enormous anthology, reflecting the work of generations of Ashkenazi Hasidic leaders". This led him to formulate this phenomenon as a movement which existed for generations and had a distinct group of leaders. Ivan G. Marcus raised support for the community's historicity by pointing out references to Chassidei Ashkenaz practices in Arba'ah Turim and Sefer ha-Manhig. He further admitted that all of the points questioning its existence do raise questions, but the questions raised by Dan and Gruenwald "do not prove that the pietist world as described in SH [Sefer Hasidim] did not exist", and "the existence of the hasidim per se and the influence of their customs are attested in non-pietist rabbinic sources". Tishby also postulates that their hostile attitude towards non-Hasidim led non-Hasidic texts to mostly ignore them (as they are only mentioned in the Tur and Sefer Hamanhig, neither of which grants them respect), in opposition to Dan's assumption that such hostility would have led to greater mention. Prior to Dan, no one questioned their existence over the centuries in which the book was studied.

The suggestion that a particular movement termed Hasidim existed was challenged recently by Elisheva Baumgarten, who has studied the term Hasid/ah, and suggested it did not refer to a particular group or movement, but rather to honest members of the community who fulfilled their religious and social obligations.

In some ways, Hasidic communities originating in Hungary, such as Satmar, have more influence from Hassidei Ashkenaz than they do from the modern Hasidic movement, for example maintaining Ashkenazic practices such as reciting Shir HaYihud and Yotzerot, that many Hasidic communities from Poland and Russia do not maintain.

Secular Jewish philosopher Martin Buber twice stated that he was influenced by the books of the Hassidei Ashkenaz, once in a letter to Jewish Nietzschean story-teller Micha Josef Berdyczewski, and a second time in his 1906 book Die Geschichten des Rabbi Nachman, which connects these ancient Jews to the 18th century Hassidism of Nachman of Breslov.

=== Outside sources ===
Though there may be earlier printed mentions that still exist, the book Yuḥasin by Abraham Zacuto, of which two original texts exist from the early 16th century (1500–1503) at Jewish museums, on leaf 221 mentions 'Eleazar Ben Yehudah Ben Kalonymous of Worms', the son of Judah the Pious. It then takes a page to discuss his book Yera'i El (Fear of God) which is clearly a successor to the Pious of Ashkenaz book of this article. The book discusses many ideas including ideas of the three parts of God, etc. (not to be confused with Christianity; it makes clear, as all Judaism does, that God is not human and has no body).

== Sources ==
- Joseph Dan, “Ashkenazi Hasidim 1941-1991” in Major Trends of Jewish Mysticism 50 Years Later 1992
- T. Alexander “Rabbi Judah the Pious as a Legendary Figure” in Mysticism, Magic, Kabbala in Ashkenazi Judaism
- Gershom Scholem, Major Trends in Jewish Mysticism
- Haym Soloveitchik, “Piety, Pietism, and German Pietism” The Jewish Quarterly Review Nos. 3-4 (January–April, 2002) 455-493.
- Ivan Marcus quoted in Joseph Dan, “Was there really a Hasidic movement in Medieval Germany?” in Gershom Scholem's Major Trends 50 Years After by Joseph Dan and Peter Schafer, pgs. 95-99.
- Joseph Dan, Torat Hasod Shel Chasidut Ashkenaz pg. 104-107.
- Kabbala: A Very Short Introduction by Joseph Dan.
- Sefer Hasidim (SH) 1076
- SH 125 158 641 745 1035 1036, as quoted in Haym Soloveitchik, “Three themes in the ‘Sefer Hasidim,’” AJSR 1 (1976) 311-358.
- SH 122 187 191, as quoted in Haym Soloveitchik, “Three themes in the ‘Sefer Hasidim,’” AJSR 1 (1976) 311-358.
- Joseph Dan, “Was there really a Hasidic movement in Medieval Germany?” in Gershom Scholem's Major Trends 50 Years After by Joseph Dan and Peter Schafer, pgs. 95-99
- Ivan Marcus, “The Historical Meaning of Haside Ashkenaz: Fact, Fiction or Cultural Self Image,” in Gershom Scholem's Major Trends in Jewish Mysticism: 50 Years After, edited by Joseph Dan and Peter Schäfer, 105-107
