= Zemirot =

Jewish hymns

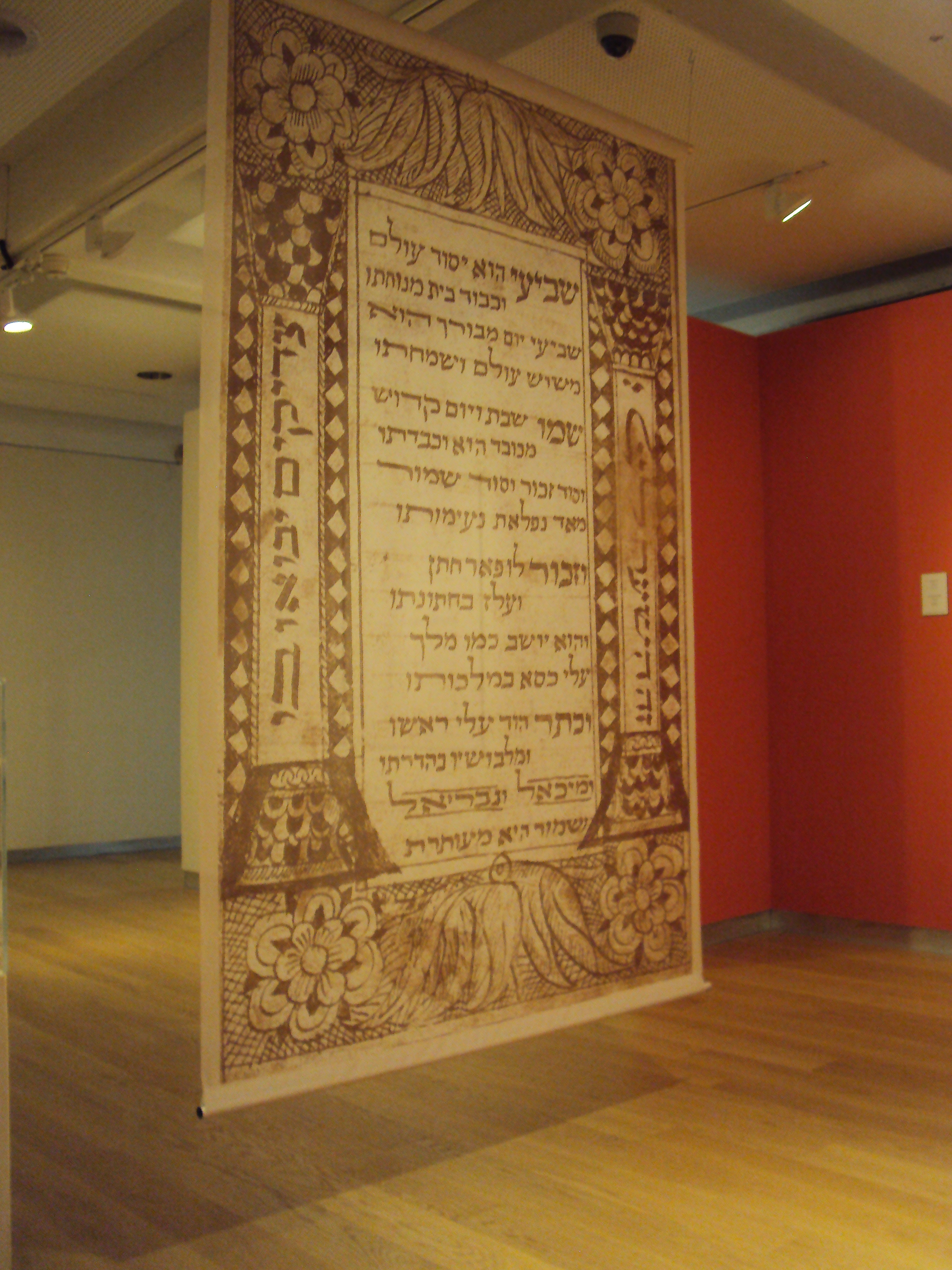
Shabbat hymns, the Italian Jewish art exhibition at Beit Hatfutsot, 2016

Zemirot or Z'miros (Hebrew: זמירות zǝmîrôt, singular: zimrah but often called by the masculine zemer) are Jewish hymns, usually sung in the Hebrew or Aramaic languages, but sometimes also in Yiddish or Ladino during Shabbat and to some extent the Jewish holidays. As a result of centuries of custom, albeit with some communal variations, each of the zemirot has become associated with one of the three obligatory meals of Shabbat: the Friday evening meal, the Saturday day meal, and the third Sabbath meal that typically starts just before sundown on Saturday afternoon. In some editions of the Jewish prayerbook (siddur), the words to these hymns are printed after the (kiddush) for each meal.

The term zemirot is one of many that can be used to describe the table hymns of Shabbat, and the term is particularly popular in the parlance of Ashkenazi Jews. When used by Spanish and Portuguese Jews, zemirot refers to the sequence of psalms in the morning service, known to other communities by the Talmudic name Pesukei Dezimra. The Sephardic communities often use the term pizmonim to describe their own tradition of extra-liturgical, domestic songs, albeit these songs are more commonly sung at times other than Shabbat.

In Yiddish, the variant zemerl (plural: zmires) is also used.

== Words and lyrics ==
Many zemirot derive from a corpus of poems written by various rabbis and sages during the early Middle Ages, which were then set to music at a later point, with some appropriated for paraliturgical purposes, such as the zemirot, and others for liturgical use, as with the piyyutim. The extra-liturgical domestic tradition of singing the zemirot increasingly gained a foothold in Jewish praxis by the 11th to 12th centuries. In the 16th century, especially, certain kabbalists of Safed and Italy such as Isaac Luria and Israel Najara, specifically authored texts with the intention of utilization as Sabbath song texts, helping to promote a mystical renaissance in Jewish thought they were pioneering at the time. Using the tunes or styles of surrounding gentile musical selections from the Levant and Turkey, and at times deploying their metaphorical strategies as well, these zemirot have diffused throughout the Jewish world similarly to the influential mystical ideologies on which they depend.

Others of the zemirot were likely conceived as anonymous folk songs that have been passed down from generation to generation. Lyrically, zemirot tend to focus on the themes of the Sabbath or the specific holiday being celebrated while employing intertextual references to the extended Jewish canon from sources as diverse as the Bible, mystical works like Sefer Yetzirah, Midrash, or Talmudical or legal literature for either artistic or expressive reasons. Certain songs are primarily didactic, listing Sabbath prohibitions and issuing recommendations for pious conduct, while underscoring the ideas of Shabbat as a treasure and covenant. Often the lyrical tie-in to Shabbat is merely implicit. Over time, various songs have acquired an association with the Sabbath or holidays based on their incorporation of metaphors for Shabbat such as redemption and Jewish chosenness, even when mention of Shabbat is absent. These heightened themes reinforce the spiritual goals of Shabbat observance.

== Melodies ==
The melodies of the zemirot vary greatly from one Jewish community to another, a result of the adaptation of Jewish liturgical content to what was available, namely local tunes and/or styles of music amid non-Jews. Hence, repertoires will differ among the diverse Jewish exilic communities in which they originated. In certain European centers, the zemirot were devised to be purposely accessible, hewing close to the melodic models of German folksongs so as to support the participation of the wider community in singing. The zemirot in their simplicity often proved a counterpoint to the growing elaborateness of cantorial synagogal liturgical music. Even still, the zemirot have lent themselves to the occasional insertion of opulent cantorial phrases, differentiating these zemirot from the gentile folk repertoires by uniting them with specifically Jewish musical developments. Still, at least some Ashkenazi tunes were conceived of for soloists in a more virtuosic vein, particularly for songs with deviating verse lengths (i.e. in contrast to the norm of zemirot alternating between choruses and verses of fixed length). By contrast, Sephardic tunes are generally more florid. One famous hymn, Adon Olam, (Ruler of the Universe) has proven particularly adaptable, and has been set to numerous tunes. New tunes continue to be written today for the same ancient lyrics. It is currently relatively rare, however, for new paraliturgical texts to be written, except for in the Sephardic and Mizrachi Jewish communities, (e.g. Aharon Amram, Asher Mizrachi, etc.) where pizmonim continue to be penned.

== History ==
The zemirot are quintessentially associated with the Shabbat table, as a domestic form of liturgy constituting a pious practice for participants and vying in stature with synagogal singing. The inclusion of songs into the gustatory rites of Shabbat is thought to help achieve the Jewish religious aspiration of transforming the domestic table into a recreation of the Temple altar. The first evidence for the practice of singing zemirot occurs in the northern French manuscript Machzor Vitry, from around the turn of the 13th century. Per scholar Albert Kohn, the Machzor Vitry included a fixed repertoire of day and evening meal songs as a rabbinic initiative to create a domestically situated liturgy complete with sophisticated song texts for the occasion, particularly from poetry written by rabbis such as Ibn Ezra and other masters. According to Rabbi Eleazar of Worms, the zemirot could also have had various functional uses, becoming ritualized occasions for separating between the obligatory meals of Shabbat lunch and the third meal, or substituting for Grace after Meals.

== Friday Night Zemirot ==
There are three mandated meals for Shabbat, and each meal is associated with its own zemirot - yet the association was in flux, particularly when it came to separating between the Shabbat lunch and the third meal. Generally, the earliest compilations of zemirot featured very few nighttime zemirot, favoring daytime zemirot, perhaps for the functional advantages of daytime zemirot such as the greater ease of reading lyric sheets in daylight (although some commentators have maintained that a reason for lighting Shabbat candles is to enable singing of the zemirot). Generally, there are more mystically laden themes in the night meal songs compared to the daytime songs. While mystical songs like Isaac Luria's Asader Seudata trilogy were annexed to each of Shabbat's three meals, there is a greater proportion of such songs sung at night.

Among the zemirot most often associated with the Friday night meal:

Pre-Kiddush Zemirot:

1. Shalom Aleichem (Unknown Author), sung to greet the visiting Shabbat angels and secure the blessings of the Shabbat angels.
2. Eshet Chayil (Proverbs 31:10-31), an allegorical song about a woman of valor, often sung in praise of the participation of women in the preparations for Shabbat.
3. Ribon Kol Ha'Olamim, a long prayer - not usually sung
4. Azameir Bishvachin (Isaac Luria), part of Luria's Shabbat trilogy for the three Shabbat meals, taking place in the apple orchard where mystical events can take place within the sefirotic context.

Post Kiddush Zemirot:

1. Bar Yochai (Rabbi Shimon Lavi) in praise of the proto-messianic contributions of the Tannaitic sage, Shimon bar Yochai, qua authoring the Zohar.
2. Kah Echsof (Aharon of Karlin (I)), is a rare Hasidic zemer. There is controversy surrounding its most common melody, which may have been used for another song, before being grafted onto Kah Echsof. The song describes the soul's yearning for it to be the day of Shabbat and confines its discussion to metaphysical and spiritualistic themes. It is typically sung at all three Shabbat meals by hasidim of Karlin-Stolin.
3. Yah Ribon Olam (Israel Najara), sung in Aramaic, which uses references from the Book of Daniel to describe God's ultimate sovereignty over the array of created beings.
4. Kol Beruei (ibn Gabirol) rehashes the poet's Neo-Platonic philosophical conceptions of the universe and of creation.
5. Kol Mekadeish affirms the importance of dedicating oneself to Shabbat observance.
6. Mah Yafit
7. Mah Yedidut (an otherwise-unidentified poet whose name, Menachem, is spelled by the initial letters of each stanza)
8. Menuchah v'Simcha
9. Odeh La'Kel (Shmaya Kasson)
10. Racheim B'Chasdecha
11. Tsur Mishelo
12. Tsama Nafshi (Abraham Ibn Ezra) combines Neo-Platonic references and descriptions of the heavenly serenading of God.
13. Ya'alah Bo'i L'Gani (Israel Najara) utilizes imagery of a garden, likening Israel to an ibex.
14. Yom Zeh L'Yisrael

== Saturday Lunch Zemirot ==
The earliest zemirot compilations featured numerous day songs. The repertoire today includes several migrant compositions like Baruch Kel Elyon that in other eras were sung to close the sabbath. One reason for this confusion could be that many of the zemirot were written to bridge Shabbat lunch and the third meal, typically by functioning as a type of musical substitute for grace after meals.

1. Al Ahavat'cha
2. Baruch Hashem Yom Yom (Rabbi Moreinu Shimon ben Rabbeinu Yitschak). In many communities, this song is divided, with the second part - beginning either with Bevo'o Mei'Edom or Yetzaveh Tzur Chasdo - reserved for the third meal.
3. Baruch Kel Elyon (Baruch ben Samuel)
4. Chay Hashem
5. D'ror Yikra (Dunash ben Labrat)
6. Ki Eshm'ra Shabbat (Abraham ibn Ezra)
7. Malechet Machshevet Bi (Ariel Amsellem)
8. Shabbat Hayom L'Hashem (Shmuel HeHasid)
9. Shimru Shabtotai
10. Yom Shabbaton (Judah Halevi)
11. Yoducha Rayonai (Israel ben Moses Najara)
12. Yom Zeh Mechubad

== Third Meal (Seudah Shlishit, Shalosh Seudos) ==
Seudah Shlishit ("the Third Meal") or Shalosh Seudos (literally, "Three Meals") is the third mandatory meal eaten for Shabbat, eaten in the afternoon. (See main article for practices relating to this meal.) Besides for the Zemirot listed, several of those from the second meal - Baruch Kel Elyon, Yom Zeh Mechubad, Deror Yikrah, Ki Eshm'ra Shabbat - are typically also sung.

1. Askinu Seudata - B'nei Heichala
2. Mizmor L'David (Psalm 23), sung three times in some communities
3. The later section of Baruch Hashem Yom Yom, beginning either with Bevo'o Mei'Edom or Yetzaveh Tzur Chasdo
4. Yedid Nefesh
5. Kel Mistater

== Ladino (Hekatia, Judaeo-Spanish, Judaeo-Catalan, Judaeo-Portuguese) Zemirot ==
1. Bendigamos Al Altissimo. This is very similar to other songs about bentsching.
2. Kuando el rey Nimrod
3. Dezilde a Mi Amor
4. Dos Amantes
5. El Rey Por Muncha Madruga
6. La Mujer de Teraj
7. La Rosa Enflorence
8. Las Compras del Rabino
9. Los Caminos de Sirkeci
10. Los Guisados de la Berenjena
11. Marinero Soy de Amor. The lyrics are taken from poetry by Miguel de Cervantes. The song exemplifies the genre of saudade, or a song of nostalgia and homesickness sung by the Portuguese. In this case, the poem expresses an exilic longing for the high culture of the medieval Iberian Peninsula or for Zion.
12. Morena
13. Non Komo Muestro Dio
14. Ocho Kandelikas
15. Pesah en la Mano
16. Scalerica de Oro
17. Shir Nashir
18. Yo En Estando/La Adultera

== See also ==
- Mah Navu Alei
- Religious Jewish music
- Shabbat
