= Aaron ben Samuel ha-Nasi =

Aaron Samuel ben Moses Shalom of Kremnitz, also Abu Aaron ben Samuel ha-Nasi of Babylonia, was a personage who was considered until the turn of the 20th century to be a fictitious creation of the Traditionists (Zunz) —those who, in their desire to find teachers and originators for everything, invented him in order to announce him as the father of prayer-interpretation and mysticism. But the publication of the Chronicle of Ahimaaz (written in 1054), by Adolf Neubauer, has demonstrated that Aaron is not altogether a creature of the imagination. It is true that legend has far more than history to say about him, and that only the barest outlines of his real career are accessible. Aaron was the son of a high dignitary in Babylonia, a certain Samuel, who, according to R. Eliezer of Worms, was a Nasi (president).

== History ==
In the Chronicle of Ahimaaz Aaron is said to have been a member of the house of Joab, which means that he was the son of an ab bet din, or chief of the court of justice; since in Jewish legend (Yer. Mak. ii. 31a; Tan., Mas'ey, 12) Joab is referred to as the chief justice in the reign of David. Disagreements between father and son, about the middle of the ninth century, caused Aaron to leave home. He traveled through Palestine to Italy, and landing at Gaeta went to Benevento. He did not stay there long, but went to Oria, in southern Italy, the center of Jewish life in Italy at that time. In that place he associated with the learned brothers, Shephatiah and Hananeel, sons of Amittai, under whose fostering influence he taught successfully—a vocation for which his profound knowledge of the Law, acquired in Babylonia, seemed especially to fit him. Aaron's activity bore fruit not only in Italy, but also beyond the borders of that country. Among his pupils were numbered Moses ben Kalonymus of Lucca, who, under one of Charlemagne's successors, went to the land of the Franks (Mentz), and there became the spiritual head of the Jews in that country. In spite of his success as a teacher in Italy, Aaron was seized by a secret longing for home; and seeing that the seed which he had carefully sown was bearing fruit, he considered himself entitled to return quietly to the land of his fathers. He embarked at Bari, to the great sorrow of his pupils and friends, among the latter being the ruler of the town, who tried to detain him by force. Nothing further is known of him. The cabalists considered him one of the chief pillars of their mysticism, ascribing to him the cabalistic works, Niḳḳud and Pardes; but see Moses Botarel's commentary on Sefer Yeẓirah, i.1, 5; ii.4, and Moses Cordovero in his Pardes Rimonim. That he is considered to be identical with "Aaron the Babylonian" appears from the fact that Botarel (iv.2) describes the latter as making use of the ineffable name of God in working the most wonderful miracles in exactly the same way as Aaron ben Samuel is said, in the Chronicle of Ahimaaz, to have done. Heinrich Graetz's identification of this Aaron with the Aaron who was a candidate for the gaonate in 814—according to Isaac Halevi even earlier—is impossible upon chronological grounds. Aaron's activity in Italy is placed by the Chronicle half a century later than this date; in 870 he was still in Italy.
