= History of the Jews in Speyer =

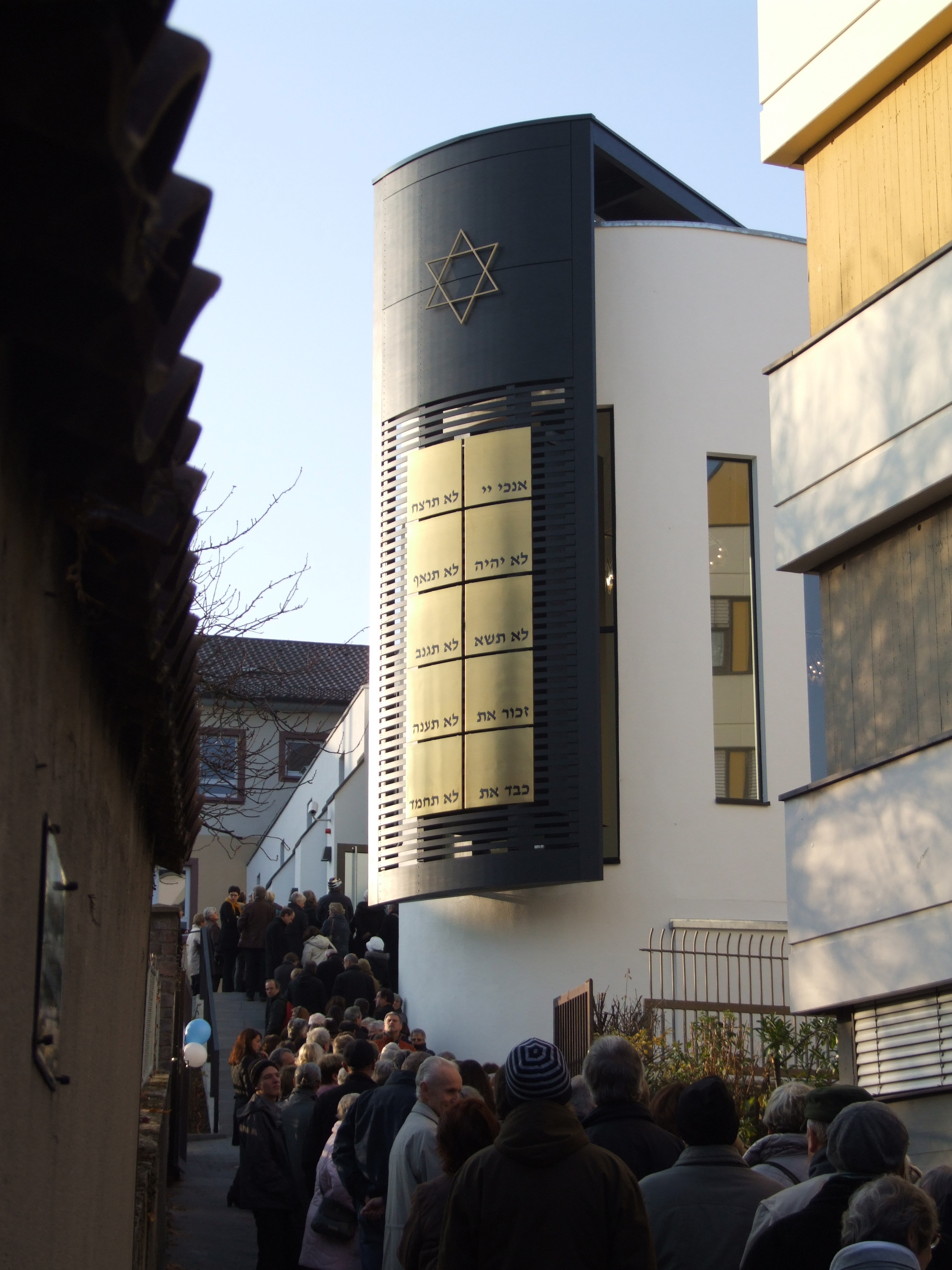
New synagogue Beith Shalom

The history of the Jews in Speyer reaches back over 1,000 years. In the Middle Ages, the city of Speyer (formerly Spira), Germany, was home to one of the most significant Jewish communities in the Holy Roman Empire. Its significance is attested to by the frequency of the Ashkenazi Jewish surname Shapiro/Shapira and its variants Szpira/Spiro/Speyer. After many ups and downs throughout history, the community was totally wiped out in 1940 during the Holocaust. With the fall of the Iron Curtain in 1989 Jews again settled in Speyer and a first assembly took place in 1996.

== Beginnings in 1084 ==
The earliest reference to Jewish settlement along the Rhine dates from the year 321 in Cologne, and it is assumed that Jews also lived in Speyer in Late Antiquity. With the collapse of state and church administration in the Migration Period and the decline of the urban Roman lifestyle, it is also assumed that Jewish communities dispersed. Jews resettled in the Rhine area coming from southern France where Roman life had more or less remained intact. Traveling Jewish merchants certainly would have had dependencies in Rhenish towns, even though the first branches are only mentioned in 906 for Mainz, and 960 for Worms. With the construction of Speyer Cathedral, beginning in 1032, Speyer emerged as one of the major towns along the Rhine. The first records of Jews in Speyer appear in the 1070s. They were members of the renowned Kalonymos family of Mainz, which had migrated a century before from Italy. Other Jews from Mainz had possibly also settled in Speyer.

The actual history of the Jews in Speyer started in 1084, when Jews fleeing from pogroms in Mainz and Worms took refuge with their relatives in Speyer. They possibly came at the instigation of bishop of Speyer Rüdiger Huzmann (1075–1090), who invited a larger number of Jews to live in his town with the expressed approval of emperor Henry IV. In his privilege or charter (Freiheitsbrief) for the Jews, the bishop wrote:

In the name of the holy and undivided Trinity, I, Rüdiger, with the surname of Huzmann, bishop of Speyer, in my endeavor to turn the village of Speyer into a city, believed to multiply its image a thousand times by also inviting Jews. I had them settle outside the quarters of the other inhabitants and as not to have them disquieted by the insolence of the lowly folk I had them surrounded by a wall. Now the place of their habitation which I acquired justly (for in the first place I obtained the hill partly with money and partly by exchange, while I received the valley by way of gift from some heirs) that place, I say, I transferred to them on condition that they pay annually 3 ½ pounds in silver for the use of the brethren. I have granted also to them within the district where they dwell, and from that district outside the town as far as the harbour, and within the harbour itself, full power to change gold and silver, and to buy and sell what they please. And I have also given them license to do this throughout the state. Besides this I have given them land of the church for a cemetery with rights of inheritance. This also I have added that if any Jew should at any time stay with them he shall pay no thelony. Then also just as the judge of the city hears cases between citizens, so the chief rabbi shall hear cases which arise between the Jews or against them. But if by chance he is unable to decide any of them they shall go to the bishop or his chamberlain. They shall maintain watches, guards, and fortifications about their district, the guards in common with our vassals. They may lawfully employ nurses and servants from among our people. Slaughtered meat which they may not eat according to their law they may lawfully sell to Christians, and Christians may lawfully buy it. Finally, to round out these concessions, I have granted that they may enjoy the same privileges as the Jews in any other city of Germany. Lest any of my successors diminish this gift and concession, or constrain them to pay greater taxes, alleging that they have usurped these privileges, and have no episcopal warrant for them, I have left this charter as a suitable testimony of the said grant. And that this may never be forgotten, I have signed it, and confirmed it with my seal as may be seen below. Given on September 15, 1084, etc.

The settlement mentioned in this privilege is the former suburb of Altspeyer in the area to the east of today's railway station. The "valley" refers either to a moat-like grove to the north of the Weidenberg (today Hirschgraben) or to the low areas around the stream of the Speyerbach. This walled settlement for Jews was well to the north outside the walls of the city proper and it is the first documented ghetto. The Jewish community had to mend and guard the walls of Altspeyer themselves.

The charter granted by bishop Huzmann went well beyond contemporary practice anywhere else in the empire. The Jews of Speyer were allowed to carry out any kind of trade, exchange gold and money, own land, have their own laws, justice system and administration, employ non-Jews as servants, and were not required to pay tolls or duties at the city's borders. The reason for asking the Jews to come to Speyer was their important role in the money and trade businesses, especially with distant regions. Money lenders were needed on a large scale for the construction of the cathedral. The deliberate settlement of Jews was seen as a measure for business development. The Jews can also be regarded as pioneers of urban development in Germany. Bishops, lords or kings who granted privileges and protection to the Jews were at the same time securing for themselves considerable revenues and protection fees; since persecution of Jews and trade restrictions led to considerable economic disadvantages and loss of revenues, it was in the ruler's best interest to restrain the antisemitic fervor of the lower clergy and the public.

With the aid of bishop Huzmann the Jews of Speyer had their rights and privileges confirmed and even expanded ("sub tuicionem nostram reciperemus et teneremus") by Henry IV as he departed on his third punitive expedition to Italy in 1090. The rights and privileges which had been especially granted to the Jews of Speyer, in particular to Judah ben Kalonymus, David ben Meshullam, and Moses ben Ghutiel (Jekuthiel), were extended to all the Jews of the empire. This Imperial Jews Charter was one of the first in Germany. The regulations concerned various political, legal, economical and religious aspects of life, most prominently free enterprise, the sale of goods to Christians and protection of property. A new regulation was that Jews who acquired stolen goods had to sell them back at the same price if the former owner wished to buy them. This constituted a major improvement because it greatly reduced the business risk for the Jews who had often been subject to accusations that they were dealing in stolen goods. In the event of disagreements between Jews and Christians from then on the "right of the concerned" was to be employed, which meant that Jews could also prove their case by oath or witness. Trials by ordeal were forbidden. Jews were also allowed to address the emperor or the imperial court directly in case of difficulties. Among each other they could use their own courts, which was to help avoid arbitrariness by Christian judges. Torture of any kind was strictly forbidden, and in the case of murder or injury the privilege stated that fines were to be paid to the emperor. The privilege also introduced strict rules for baptisms. Forced baptisms of children were totally outlawed. Jews voluntarily getting baptised were required to think it over for three days. Conversions were also made more difficult in that baptised Jews would lose their rights to inheritance. Basically, these regulations were meant to protect the size of the Jewish community and to ensure continued revenues. Jews were also allowed to employ Christian maids, wet nurses and labourers in their homes as long as it was ensured that they could observe the Christian Sundays and holidays. Neither the original charter granted by the bishop nor its re-enactment by the emperor proved sufficient to afford the Jews adequate protection.

The two charters of 1084 and 1090 marked the beginning of the "golden era" of the Jews in Speyer which, with limitations, was to last into the 13th or 14th century. They also called for a sound Jewish community in the town by that time. According to these documents, an "Archisynagogos", also called a "Jews bishop" (episcopus Iudeorum) presided the administration as well as the court of the community. He was elected by the community and confirmed by the bishop. Later, sources report of a "Jews council" of twelve presided by the Jews bishop who represented the community outside. In 1333 and 1344, the authority of the Jews council was expressly confirmed by the city council of Speyer.

== Massacres of 1096 ==
Only twelve years after granting the first privileges for Jews in the empire a wave of pogroms swept the country, triggered by an epidemic of the plague, which was blamed on the Jews, and the First Crusade. The Jews of Speyer were among the first to be hit, but compared to the communities in Worms and Mainz, which followed a few days later, they got off lightly.

On 3 May 1096, Count Emicho stopped in Speyer on his way to the crusade and, together with burghers of Speyer and peasants from nearby, attacked the Jews and the synagogue. In a report on the pogroms of 1096 in Speyer and Worms, written 1097–1140 by the so-called Mainz Anonymous, it says: "And it happened on the 8. day in the month of Iyar (6 May 1096), on a Sabbath, the last judgement started to come upon us as the mistaken and city dwellers rose in Speyer against the holy men, the pious of the Almighty; they conspired against them to seize them together in the synagogue. This came to their attention, so they rose early in the morning, even on Sabbath, prayed briefly and left the synagogue. And when they (the enemy) noticed that their plan to seize them together couldn't be followed, they rose against them and killed eleven souls among them….And it happened when Bishop John heard of this, he came with many troops and wholeheartedly stood by the community, he took them into his private quarters and saved them from their hands" The bishop had the rioters punished severely and the Jews stayed in the bishop's palace on the northern side of the cathedral and in other nearby towns until the rage of the mob had subsided. Taking this action, the bishop of Speyer (Johann vom Kraichgau I, 1090–1104) prevented massacres and expulsions as happened in other cities of the Rhineland. 800 Jews perished in the pogroms of Worms and even 1000 in Mainz. The events in Speyer are also mentioned in Solomon Bar Simson's chronicle on the Pogroms of 1096 which he wrote around 1140.

== Flourishing times ==
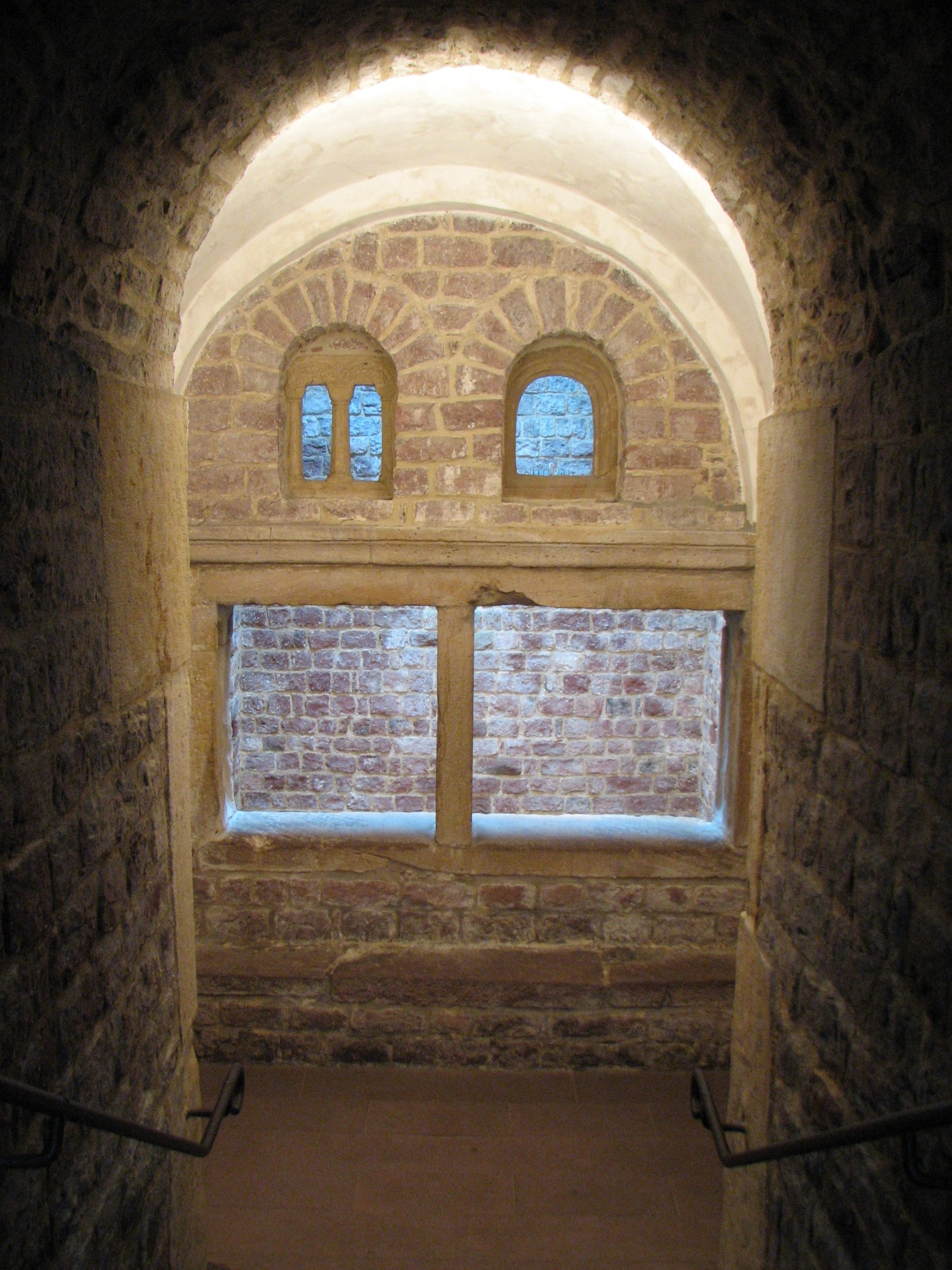
First room in the medieval mikveh in Speyer.

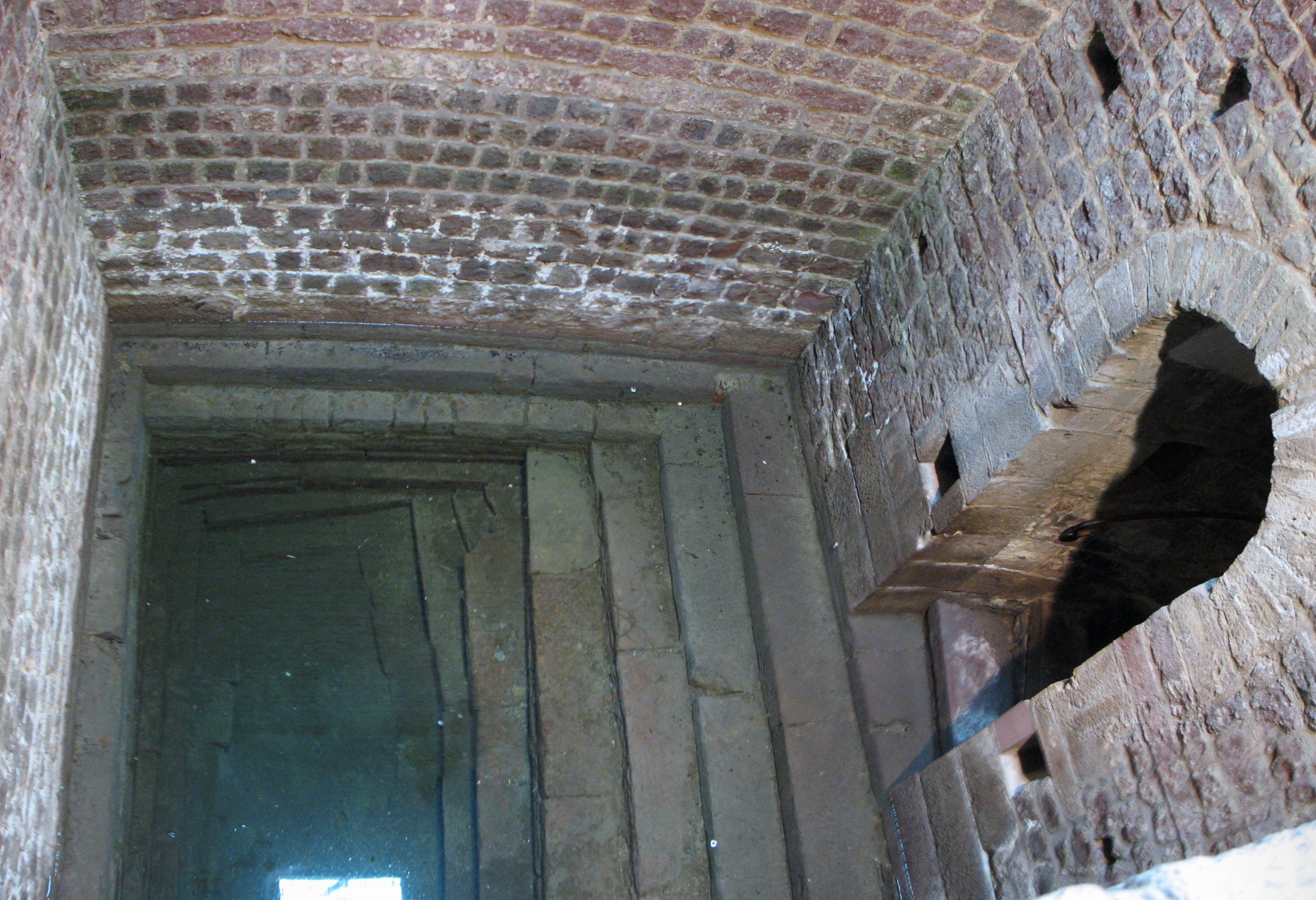
Pool of the medieval mikveh in Speyer, dating back to 1128

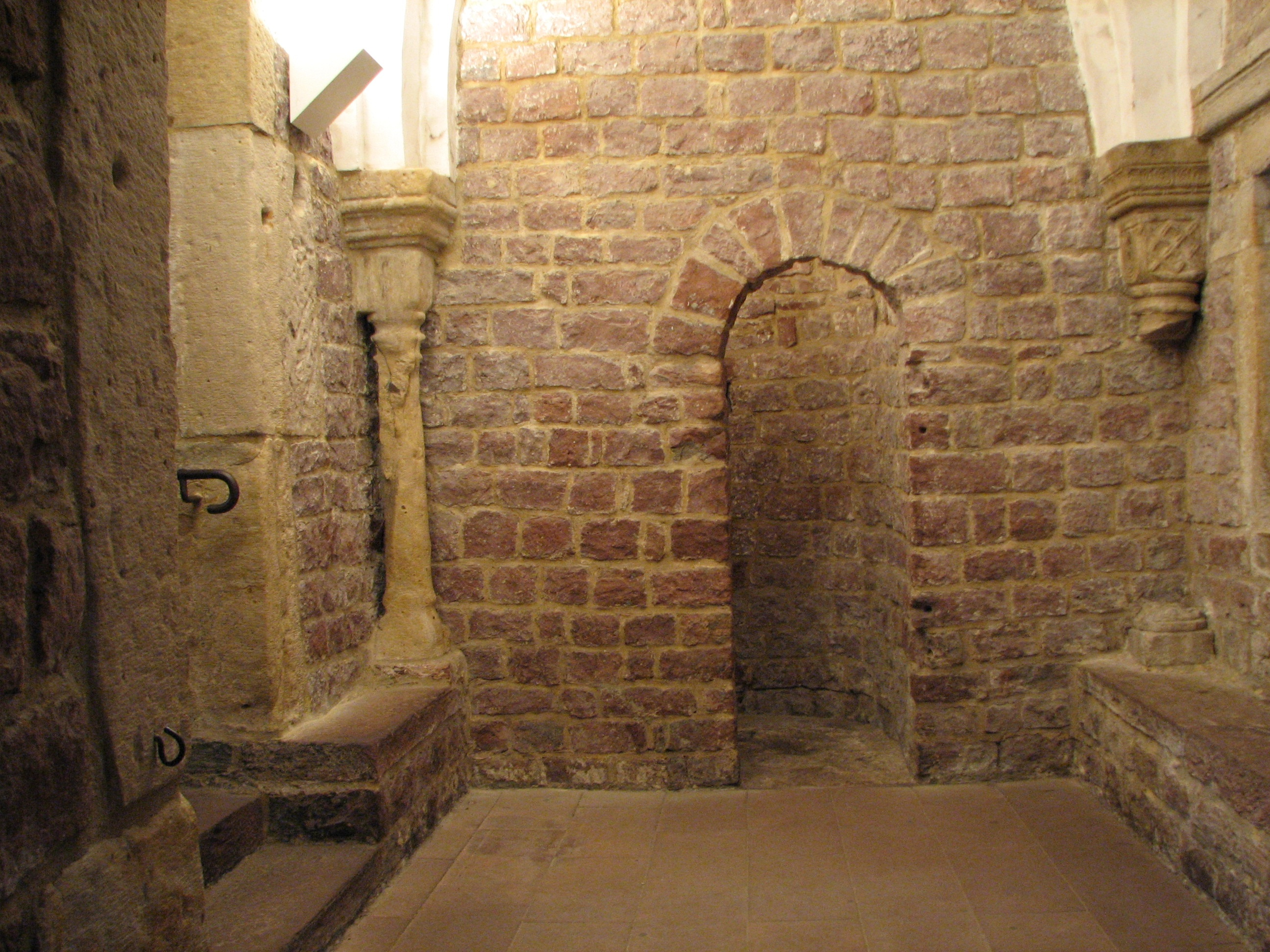
Changing alcove in the Speyer Mikveh

Around the time of these events a second Jewish quarter was established in the vicinity of the cathedral along modern day Kleine Pfaffengasse which used to be the Judengasse (Jews Alley) while the settlement with a synagogue continued to exist in Altspeyer. It is estimated that the Jewish community of Speyer consisted of 300 to 400 people. Around 1100, on the Judengasse (today Pfaffengasse), the Jews built the Judenhof (Jewish courtyard) as the centre of their community containing a mikveh with a pool at groundwater level for ritual baths, a men's and later a women's synagogue. The synagogue, designed and built by the same architects as the cathedral of Speyer, was consecrated on 21 September 1104, eleven years after the pogrom of 1096. It fell into disuse in the 16th century but its ruins today represent the oldest visible remnants of a mikveh in central Europe. Today it is an archaeological heritage site and has been made accessible; the pool is still supplied by groundwater.

Along with the Frisians, the Jews made up the majority of the long distance merchants in the 11th and 12th centuries. Both groups had their headquarters in the merchant's quarters right at the free cathedral territory. Members of the Kalonymos family lived in Speyer at that time and took a leading part in the development of Jewish studies in Germany. One example is Jekuthiel ben Moses, a liturgical poet and author of the reshut יראתי to Kalir's Kerobah for the feast of Rosh Hashana. A son of Jekuthiel named Moses of Speyer has been quoted as a high Talmudical authority. Another Kalonymos from Speyer for some time was responsible for the finances of emperor Barbarossa. Another famous man of letters, Jehuda ben Samuel he-Chasid, called Jehuda the Pious, and the son of the German halachist Balakist Kalonymus ben Isaac the Elder, was born 1140 in Speyer. In these years the Jewish community of Speyer became one of the most significant in the Holy Roman Empire. It was an important centre for Torah studies and, in spite of pogroms, persecution and expulsion, it had considerable influence on the spiritual and cultural life of the city. In a synod of Rabbis in Troyes around 1150 the leadership of the Jews in Germany was transferred to the Jewish communities of Speyer, Worms and Mainz. This was confirmed by a convention of Rabbis in Mainz. The three communities created a federation called "SHUM" (שום: initials of the Hebrew names of the three cities: Shpira (Hebrew: שפירא), Warmaisa, Magenza) and kept this leadership until the middle of the 13th century. Over a period of decades, these communities enacted a body of regulations known as Takkanot SHUM. The SHUM-Cities had their own rite and were accepted as central authority in legal and religious matters. Speyer had renowned Jewish schools and a highly frequented Yeshiva. Because of their high esteem in the Middle Ages the three SHUM-Cities were praised as "Rhenish Jerusalem". They had considerable influence on the development of Ashkenazi culture. In the 13th century Isaac ben Moses of Vienna Or Zarua wrote: "From our teachers in Mainz, Worms and Speyer the teachings were spread to all of Israel ...", and all the communities in Germany and in the Slavic kingdoms were followers.

Yet, even in this flourishing period of the Speyer Jewry, there were outbursts of violence in 1146 during the Second Crusade, in which not only laymen but also members of the clergy took part. This came to the attention of Bernard of Clairvaux who wrote a letter of reproach to Bishop Günther. Among the victims of this pogrom was a woman named Minna, whose ears and tongue were cut off because she refused to submit to baptism.

== Pogroms and expulsions beginning 1195 ==
In the wake of the Third Crusade in February 1195 the Jewish community of Speyer was subject to new persecutions during which nine Jews were killed. On 13 February the daughter of Rabbi and judge Isaak ben Ascher Halevi the Younger (*1130) was accused of ritual murder (blood libel), killed and displayed in the market square for three days. Halevi himself was killed when he tried to interfere and recover his daughter's body from the mob. Many Jews sought refuge on the high balcony of the synagogue where they had to remain until Hezekiah ben Reuben of Boppard and Moses ben Joseph ha-Kohen effected their release by paying a ransom. The Jews fled and their homes were plundered and burned; the synagogue in Altspeyer was destroyed. When Emperor Henry VI returned from Apulia, the perpetrators were compelled to pay damages to him as well as to the Jews.

Riots again occurred in Speyer in 1282 over a blood libel when Herbord, Ritter von der Ohm, accused the Jews of having murdered his grandson. The ensuing rage among the populace had Bishop Werner lay the matter before the provincial synod of Aschaffenburg on September 8, 1282. In the following year Emperor Rudolph approved the decision of this synod and ordered property to be taken from the Jews and reverted to the royal treasury. As the persecutions in Speyer continued, the Jews of Speyer and neighboring Mainz, Worms, and Oppenheim decided to emigrate to the Holy Land. Led by Meir B. Baruch in 1286, the attempt was ill-fated and the property of the few who actually succeeded was confiscated. On June 24, 1291, Rudolph issued another order for taxes, requiring the Jews of Speyer to maintain the newly established Fort and garrison of Landau.

At the beginning of the 14th century, the powers of the emperor and the bishop were weakened; for a payment of 300 pounds heller the city of Speyer took on the protection of the Jews, which proved as ineffectual as that of the bishop.

On Easter week, 1343, when the body of a Christian named Ludwig was found, Jews were tortured and burned at the stake. On March 11, 1344, Speyer requested the king's permission to confiscate the houses of these Jews for the benefit of the city, which was granted. During the great plague of 1348/49 pogroms swept through France and Germany, especially the Rhineland, and on 22 January 1349 the Jewish community of Speyer was totally wiped out. Many chose to be burned in their homes, among them Rabbi Eliakim, others converted or fled to Heidelberg or Sinzheim. In one account, the burnt corpses were collected into empty winecasks and rolled into the Rhine. Property and the cemetery were confiscated. In view of this "breach of the urban order of peace" (Bruch der städtischen Friedensordnung), which was to protect all the city dwellers alike, emperor Charles IV, who came to Speyer in spring 1349, declared on March 29, 1349, that the city had no blame whatsoever for the riots. Some of the Jews who had managed to escape returned to Speyer beginning in 1352, but were driven out anew the following year only to be allowed to return again in 1354, when they were assigned to quarters between Webergasse and the old school. On December 24 of that year, their synagogue and school, their cemetery and their "Dantzhus" or "Brutehus" were returned to them. In 1364 Bishop Adolph borrowed 800 guilders from the Jews for a weekly interest of one Strassburg pfennig. Bishop Nicolaus (1390) granted the Jews permission to settle in any city within the Speyer diocese on payment of a yearly tribute of 15 guilders. One half of this income went to the garrison, the other to the diocese. In 1394 King Wenceslaus renewed the decree of 1349 by Emperor Charles IV, which declared the Jews to be the property of the city.

The Jewish community of Speyer never regained the size and status it had had before 1349. In the years between the pogroms the relations between Jews and Christians were tense and the Jews had to put up with many restrictions. From 1405 to 1421 they were entirely banned from the city. On February 11, 1431, King Sigismund ordered that any complaint brought against Jews in Speyer should be heard only before the municipal court, indicating that Jews lived in Speyer that year. There is a document from 1434 in which the Speyer council renewed the right of the Jews to live in the city for another six years, for which 5 to 35 Gilders were to be paid per household. Yet, the council again had to yield to the demands of the citizens and decree an expulsion; as early as the following year, on 8 May 1435, the Jews were again expelled "for ever" from the city. The decree said: "The council is compelled to banish the Jews; but it has no designs upon their lives or their property: it only revokes their rights of citizenship and of settlement. Until November 11 they are at liberty to go whither they please with all their property, and in the meantime they may make final disposition of their business affairs." One of the refugees from Speyer was Moses Mentzlav whose son, Israel Nathan, founded a printing house in Soncino, Italy.

Again, for 1467 there is a document confirming that the city of Speyer welcomed Jews for another ten years at the direction of the bishop, who had special powers to set rules for the livelihoods of the Jews. In the years 1468, 1469 and 1472 Bishop Matthias von Rammung decreed that all Jews in Speyer were to live together in one area and that they might have a synagogue. They were to wear clothes of such a fashion as to distinguish them from the Christians. Men were to wear pointed hats in different colours (this had already been decided at the Fourth Council of the Lateran in 1215) and a yellow ring on their chest. There are documents showing Jews of Speyer already wearing pointed hats by the mid-14th century. Jewish women had to wear two blue ribbons in their veils. Jews were forbidden to participate in the public occasions of the Christians, employ Christian servants or midwives, sell medicines, or engage in usury. Jews had to stay out of public areas and were to keep their windows and doors closed during Holy Week and important holidays. In 1472 many Jews committed suicide to avoid forced baptism. As of 1500/1529 there were no Jews in Speyer.

== Scholars and rabbis from Speyer ==
- 11th century: Kalonymus ben Moses, Jekuthiel ben Moses, Moses ben Jekuthiel, Judah ben Kalonymus, David ben Meshullam.
- 12th century: Abraham ben Meïr ha-Kohen, Kalonymus ben Isaac, Jacob ben Isaac ha-Levi, Eleazar ha-Ḥazzan, Eliakim ha-Levi, Isaac ben Asher ha-Levi, Samuel of Speyer, Abraham ben Solomon, Isaac of Bohemia, Eliezer ben Isaac, Judah ben Kalonymus ben Meir, Meïr ben Kalonymus, David of Speyer, Judah ben Kalonymus ha-Baur, Shemariah ben Mordecai, Eliezer ben Joel ha-Levi, Simha ben Samuel, Abraham ben Samuel
- 13th century: Eleazar ben Jacob, Jacob ben Asher of Speyer, Jedidiah ben Israel, Solomon of Speyer.
- 14th century: Moses Süsslin, later "Judenmeister" in Frankfurt
- 15th century: Samuel Isaac ha-Ḳadosh and Shemariah Salman ha-Levi

== The "Great Jews Privilege Charter" of Speyer 1544 ==
Great Jews Privilege Charter of Speyer 1544 (Großes Speyrer Judenprivileg), Insertion in the confirmation of 1548, page 1 of 7

At the diet of 1544 in Speyer the Jews of the empire complained to emperor Charles V that they were mistreated and denied their given rights. This included beatings, tortures and killings, imprisonment, robbery, expulsion, closing of schools and synagogues, payment of tolls and duties and the denial of the right to appeal to the imperial or other courts. A trigger for the new wave of antisemitism in the empire can be seen in Martin Luther's antisemitic writings of 1543.

Accordingly, Charles V considered it necessary to renew and confirm the Jews' charter. At the same time these rights and privileges were extended to the Jews of the whole empire. Nobody was to have the right to close their schools and synagogues, to drive them out or hinder their use. Whoever violated the imperial constitutio pacis by infringing upon the rights of the Jews was to be punished by every authority. Every Jew was to have the right to do business in the empire and every authority was to protect him and not burden him with tolls or duties. Jews were not required to wear "Jewish insignias" outside of their dwellings and no Jew was to be driven from his home without the emperor's expressed consent. Because Jews paid higher taxes but had no public offices, real estate or manual trade, they were allowed to charge higher interest rates than the Christians. It was forbidden to accuse Jews of using Christian blood without due proof and witness, to take them prisoner, to torture or to execute them. Infringements of this privilege were to be fined with 50 marks in gold, one half to be paid to the emperor and the other to the Jewish community. In 1548 this charter was once more confirmed by Charles V and again by emperor Maximilian II in 1566.

== 17th, 18th and 19th centuries ==
From 1621 to 1688 Jews again settled in Speyer. It was especially during the Thirty Years' War and the following years that the indebted cities saw themselves forced to make use of their financial power. In Speyer at least five such loans are documented between 1645 and 1656. The city started taking out loans from Jews as early as 1629. This enabled the Jews to anticipate the town's forthcoming profits in trade matters, which got them into conflict with the guilds. So, because of complaints, the Jews trading rights were restricted several times for short periods of time during the 17th century. Before Speyer was burned down by the French in 1689, trade and financial transactions with Jews had been totally banned. In the following years of reconstruction Jews were not allowed to resettle permanently.

Until 1750, the internal affairs of the small community were administered by the rabbi of Worms for an annual compensation of 10 Reichsthaler. Visits by the rabbis required official permission, as documents from 1682, 1685, 1698, 1713, and 1746 show. In the last-named document a reference is made to "our rabbi David Strauss of Worms". Episcopal edicts in 1717, 1719, 1722, 1726, 1727, 1728, 1736, 1741, and 1748 prohibited Romanies and Jews having no safe-conducts from visiting the diocese estates; and those that were provided with safe-conducts were required, for sanitary reasons, to submit their bundles or packages to a rigid examination. As of 1752 the Jews were forbidden, on pain of severe punishment, to employ the services of any rabbi other than their own. The first rabbi of Speyer was Isaac Weil (1750–63), succeeded by Löwin Löb Calvaria, whose salary was provided by a bequest in the testament of a Jew named Süssle.

At the end of the 18th century, a Jewish community re-established itself in Speyer after the French Revolution. It distinguished itself by its liberal and emancipated attitudes which repeatedly brought it into conflict with the more conservative district rabbinate of Bad Dürkheim. In 1828 it founded a welfare club and contributed to the efforts of the city council fighting the great poverty in the town. In 1830 the Speyer Jewish community had 209 members. In 1837 it built a new synagogue on the site of the former church of St. Jacob on Heydenreichstraße; the synagogue included a little school.

In 1863 Carl David became the first Jewish council member in Speyer. A leading figure of the Jews, Sigmund Herz, was member of the city council from 1874 to 1914. By 1890 the Jewish community had grown to 535 members, the greatest number ever in Speyer; by 1910 the number had diminished to 403. In the early 1930s Speyer Jews started leaving for larger cities or to emigrate because of rising antisemitism.

== The Jewish community in the 20th century and today ==
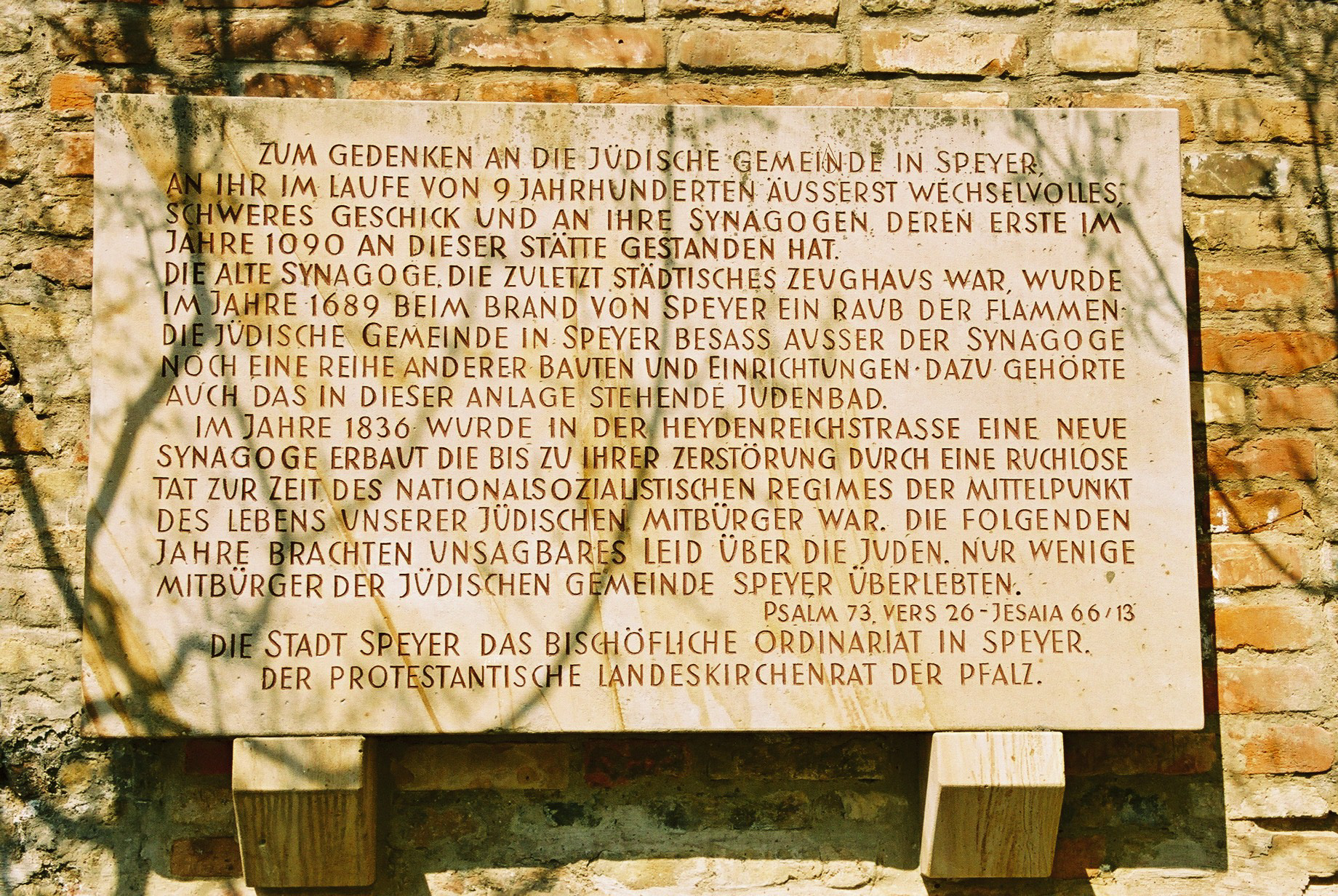
Memorial plaque in the Speyer Judenhof

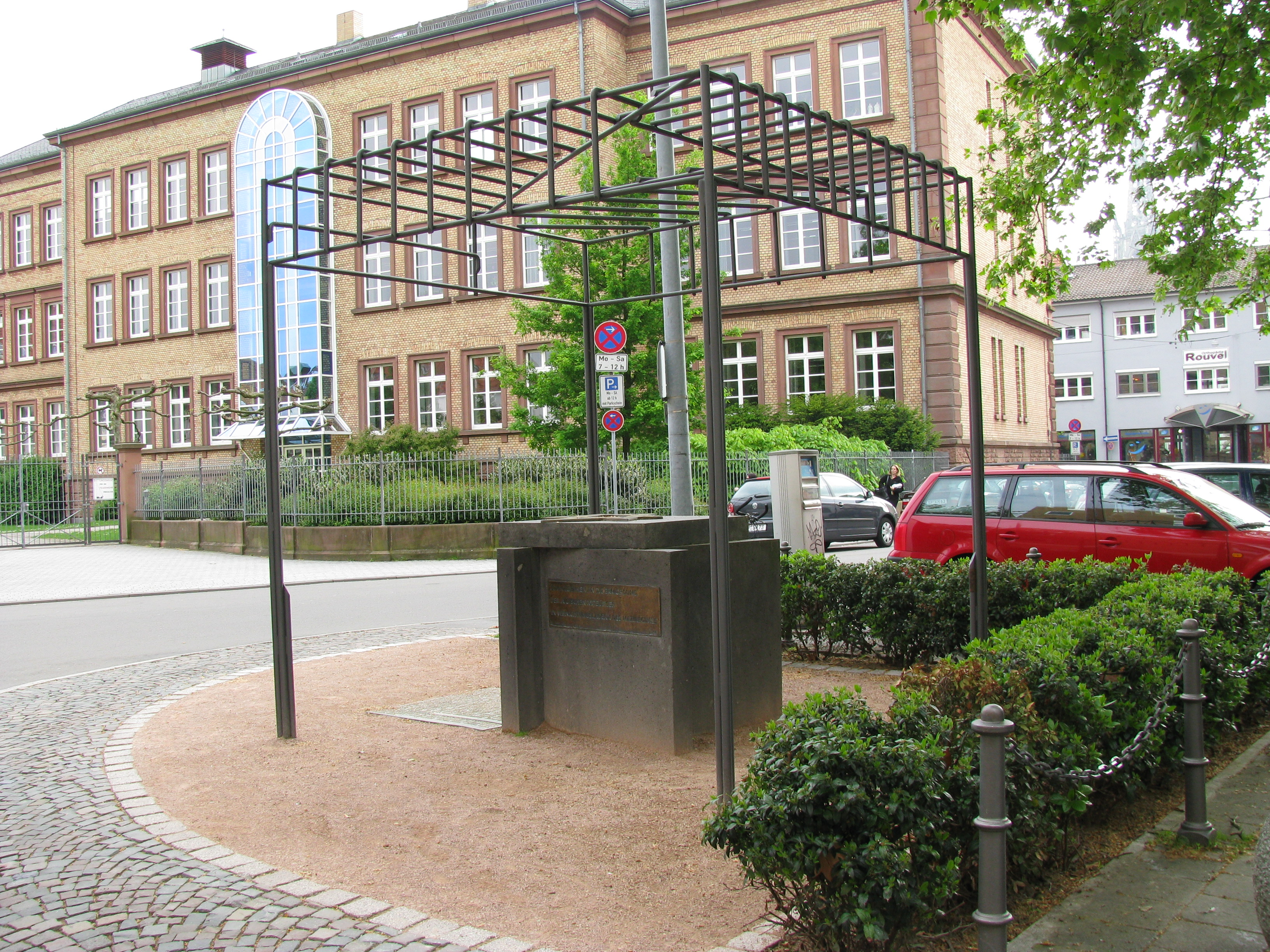
Monument commemorating the deported Jews of Speyer at the site of the former synagogue

By 1933, the number of Jews in Speyer had fallen to 269, and by the time their synagogue was torched in the November pogroms of 1938 (Kristallnacht) there were only 81 left. In the night of 9 November, SA and SS troops looted the synagogue on Heydenreichstraße, taking away the library, precious cloths, carpets and ritual utensils and setting the building alight. The firemen only kept an eye on the neighbouring buildings. Along with the synagogue the Jews also lost their school. The same night the Jewish cemetery was also vandalized. The debris of the synagogue was removed in the following days, which was billed to the Jewish community. A member of the community supplied a prayer room in his house on Herdstraße. The city later used this house as a storage for furniture left behind by deported Jews.

On 22 October 1940, 51 of the 60 Jews remaining in Speyer were deported to the internment camp of Gurs in southern France. Some of them managed to escape to Switzerland, the USA and South Africa with the aid of locals, while others were deported to Germany and murdered at Auschwitz. Only one Jew survived the Nazi era hidden in Speyer.

In 1951, the city of Speyer considered putting a parking lot on the site of the former synagogue. In 1955 the council decided on a payment of 30,000 DM to the German Jewish community (as settlement of a restitution procedure). In 1959 the department store company Anker bought the whole block, including the empty lot of the former synagogue, for Speyer's first department store on Maximilianstraße (today Kaufhof). At the recommendation of the German Cities Council, Speyer bought development bonds from the State of Israel worth 2,000 DM in 1961.

In 1968, a commemorative plaque was unveiled in the court of the mikveh commemorating the fate of the Speyer Jews. In 1979 another plaque was attached at the back wall of the Kaufhof department store building where the synagogue once stood. Right in front of the site a monument was erected in 1992. Shortly after it was moved across the street to its present place because of the restricted space. There was no majority for a 2007 motion in the council by the Social Democratic Party to have commemorative brass cobblestones (so-called Stolpersteine or "stumbling stones") placed in the pavement in front of buildings where Jews lived until their deportation. This has been done in many other German cities.

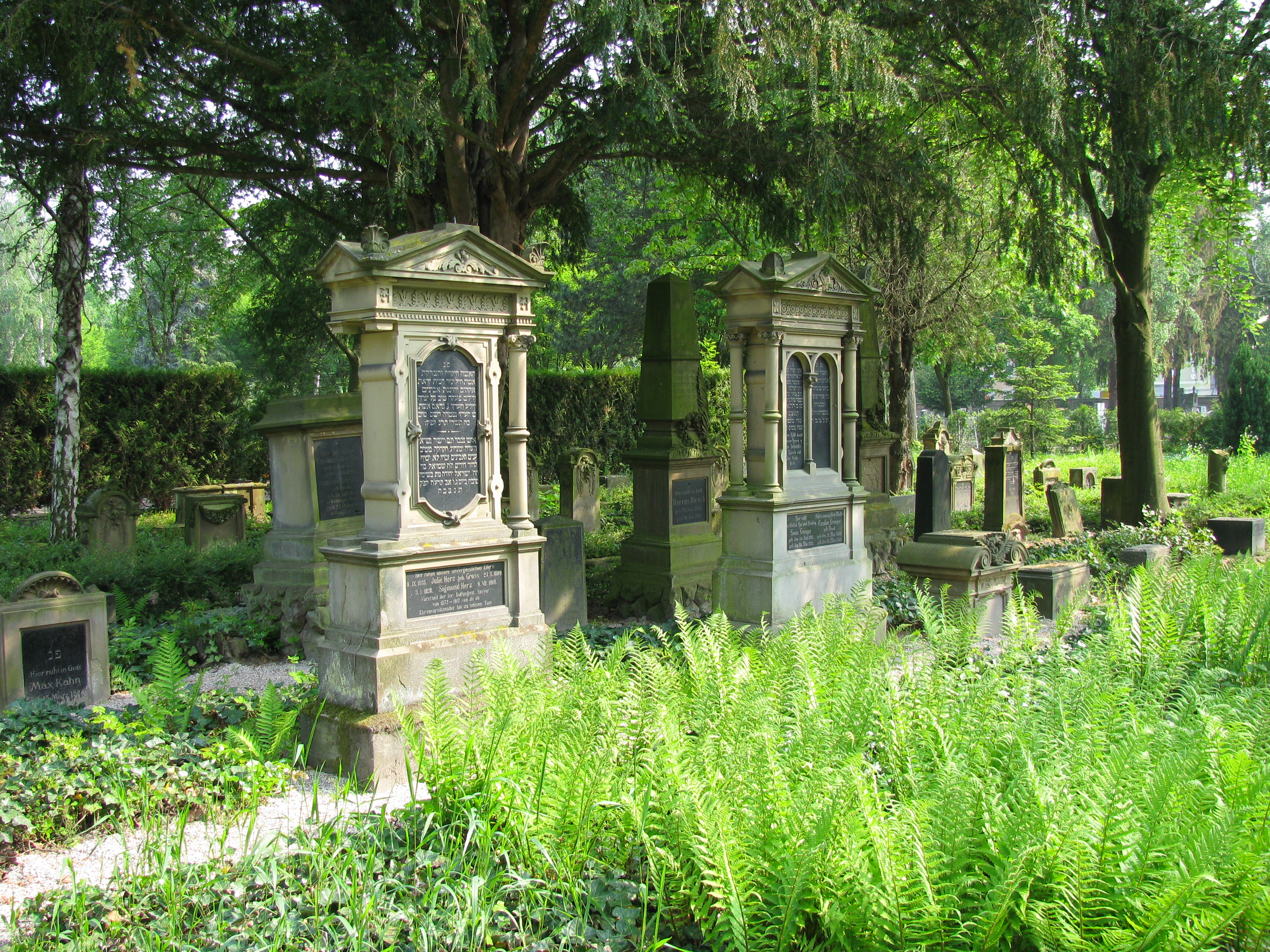
Jewish cemetery today

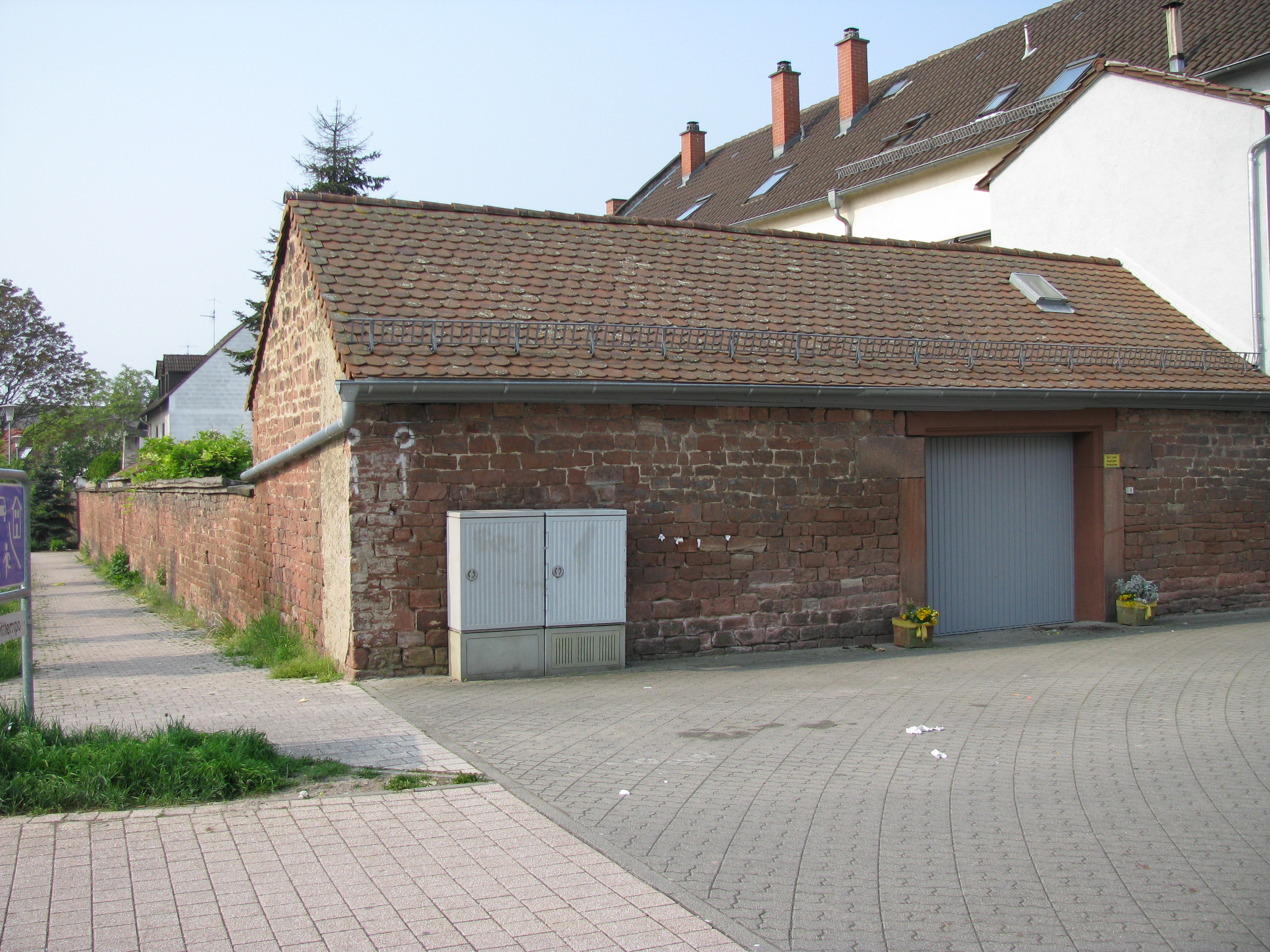
Mortuary and eastern wall of Jewish cemetery at St. Klara Klosterweg (until 1888)

Up to the 1990s there was no Jewish community in Speyer. It was only in October 1996 that a first assembly took place. Ten Jews who had emigrated from Eastern Europe decided to found a new Jewish community. It was also decided to build a new synagogue by extending the former medieval church of St. Guido. The cornerstone of the Synagogue Beith-Shalom was laid on 9 November 2008. Consecration took place on 9 November 2011 in the presence of President Christian Wulff, Premier Kurt Beck, Speyer Mayor Hansjörg Eger, Bishop Karl-Heinz Wiesemann and Church President Christian Schad. A very honoured guest was Jack Mayer, born 1930 in Speyer, who had fled with his mother and brother to the United States in 1938.

The medieval Jewish cemetery of Speyer lay opposite the Judenturm (Jews' tower) to the west of the former Jews' quarter in Altspeyer (today between Bahnhofstraße and Wormer Landstraße). After the pogroms of 1349 it was ploughed under and in 1358 the city returned some of it as leasehold estate. After the expulsion of 1405 the area was owned by a Christian but in 1429 the Jews were able to retrieve it. After the expulsion of 1435 the city confiscated the cemetery and leased it to Christians. In the 18th century it was the garden plot of the poor house (Elendherbergsacker). After Jews resettled in Speyer in the 19th century, a new cemetery was built at St. Klara Monastery Street (St.-Klara-Kloster Weg) and remained in use until 1888. The former mortuary and a part of the western wall are still in place. In 1888, the Jewish cemetery was moved to the new city cemetery built in the north of Speyer along Wormser Landstraße, where it now occupies the southeastern section.

== Bibliography ==
- Zunz, Leopold in: Ritus, p. 200;
- idem, Z. G. p. 415;
- Kohut, Geschichte der Deutschen Juden, Index, s.v.;
- Wiener, 'Emeḳ ha-Baka, p. 9, Leipzig, 1858;
- idem, Gesch. der Juden in der Stadt und Diöcese Speier, in Monatsschrift der Gesellschaft für die Wissenschaft des Judenthums, 1863, pp. 161, 255, 297, 417, 454;
- Jaffé, Urkunde des Bischof Rüdiger vom 13 September 1084, in Orient, Lit. 1842, No. 46;
- idem, Urkunde Heinrich III. vom 19 Februar, 1090, ib. 1842, No. 47;
- H. Breslau, Diplomatische Erläuterungen zum Judenprivilegium Heinrich IV. in Zeitschrift für Geschichte der Juden in Deutschland, i. 152–159;
- Stobbe, Die Judenprivilegien Heinrich IV. für Speier und Worms, ib. i. 205–215;
- idem, Die Juden in Deutschland Während des Mittelalters, Index, s.v., Brunswick, 1866;
- Berliner, Eliakim von Speyer, in Monatsschrift der Gesellschaft für die Wissenschaft des Judenthums, 1868, pp. 182–183;
- Kaufmann, Die Hebräischen Urkunden der Stadt Speier, ib. 1886, pp. 517–520;
- Eppstein, A. in: Jüdische Alterthümer in Worms und Speyer, pp. 13–31, Breslau, 1896;
- Rothschild, L. in: Die Judengemeinden in Mainz, Speier, und Worms, 1349–1438, Berlin, 1904;
- Neubauer and Stern, Hebräische Berichte, Index, s.v., Berlin, 1902;
- Salfeld, Martyrologium, pp. 91, 101, 246;
- Zivier, E. in: Monatsschrift der Gesellschaft für die Wissenschaft des Judenthums, xlix. 225–226;
- Doctor in: Blätter für Jüdische Geschichte und Literatur, Mainz, v., No. 7, pp. 102–104.J. S. O.
- Stern, Edgar E. in: The Peppermint Train: Journey to a German-Jewish Childhood. University Press of Florida, 1992, ISBN 0-8130-1109-4.
