= Meshullam ben Kalonymus =

Rabbi, posek, commentator on the Mishnah, and Paytan (~950 – ~1010)

- Born: 950; Lucca
- Died: 1010; Mainz
- Children: Kalonymus ben Meshullam (son)
- Father: Kalonymus ben Moses

Rabbi Meshullam ben Kalonymus (Hebrew: משולם בן קָלוֹנִימוּס also known as Rabbeinu Meshullam, Meshullam the Great, Meshullam the Roman and also in Hebrew: מְשֻׁלָּם; ~950 – ~1010), was born in Lucca, Italy, or in Mainz, Germany. He was a posek (halakhic decision maker) of the Gaonic period, a commentator on the Mishnah and a Paytan (liturgical poet).

== Biography ==
Little is known about his life. The names "Kalonymus" and "Meshullam" appear repeatedly in the lineage of the Kalonymus family (and even with the epithet "the Great"). It is accepted by most scholars that Rabbi Meshullam Danan was the son of Kalonymus ben Moses. It is assumed that Moses ben Kalonymus was from the family that emigrated from Lucca to Mainz, approximately between 900 and 926 CE. Therefore, it is possible that Rabbi Kalonymus and his son, Kalonymus, flourished in Mainz and were among the early sages of German Jewry.

There are also disagreements about the year of his birth and year of death. Leopold Zunz dates his death earlier to 976 CE, but it is accepted today that he died between 1000 and 1010 CE.

According to a letter from Rabbi Samuel ben Danan, of the second generation of exiles from Spain, when Rabbeinu Meshullam was fourteen years old, he was taken from his father by merchants who took him with them to Babylonia. There he was sold to the Exilarch and head of the yeshiva in Babylonia. Initially Rabbeinu Meshullam was responsible for the kitchen, and in secret he would correct the writings of the head of the yeshiva based on what he had learned from his father. Two students remained in secret to discover the identity of the corrector, and when they discovered it was Rabbeinu Meshullam they sat him with them in the yeshiva. At some point the daughter of the Exilarch was also offered to him in marriage, but Rabbeinu Meshullam refused to marry without his father's permission. According to the letter, Rabbeinu Meshullam returned to Mainz and married his relative there and had a son named Todros. And Rabbi Todros was the head of the yeshiva in Mainz after his father died.

His son, Rabbi Kalonymus ben Meshullam is famous from the aggadah about Rabbi Amnon of Mainz, who received the prayer in a dream and it was given validity by its author.

He preceded the early halakhic decisors, some of whom lived in his time, such as: Rabbeinu Gershom Meor HaGolah, the liturgical poet Rabbi Shimon ben Yitzchak (from the "Abin" family which was connected by marriage ties to the "Kalonymus" family). He is cited by Rashi and Tosefot, and was considered one of the greatest sages of Ashkenaz in his time.

== His works ==
Several remnants of his works have been found, mostly in the Cairo Geniza. They include several areas: Halachic rulings in a question and answer format (she'elot u-teshuvot), piyyutim (liturgical poetry), and a commentary on Pirkei Avot (Ethics of the Fathers). A famous letter of his to the Jews of Constantinople deals with confronting the Karaites. He proved from the Bible that one my leave one's home on Sabbath and may have lights burning on Sabbath night.

=== Responsa ===
Rabbeinu Meshullam was well known in many communities and received queries from all over Ashkenaz. His responses deal with all areas of life, but two topics stand out: commercial and financial laws (e.g. discussion of "ma'arufot" - clientele) and community order (e.g. dispute between the Jewish community of Arles, France and converts joining the community). This reflects the awakening of Jewish community life in Ashkenaz in the early second millennium CE.

In his responses he frequently relied on the Tannaim and Geonim of his generation. He would refer questions to Rabbi Sherira Gaon and his son Rabbi Hai Gaon. Most of his responses were written in Hebrew with some in Aramaic.

Some of his responses appear in the early book "B'shar al Gabei Gachalim".

=== Piyutim ===
Twelve of his piyyutim have been preserved, including "Eemich Nachamti", recited on Yom Kippur morning in the Ashkenazi rite (one part is the piyyut "Al Yisrael Emunato"), and two orders of worship "Amitz Koach" and "Esochach Niflaotecha." He composed a comprehensive Haggadah series for Pesach beginning "Afik Ranen" based on Shir Hashirim. This was accepted in the Ashkenazi rite and some French communities for the second day of Pesach. He also wrote two zulatot on the servitude of kingdoms. Additionally, there are several selichot (penitential poems) attributed to him though this is uncertain. His piyyutim belong to the Italian-Ashkenazi school influenced by the Land of Israel piyyut tradition.

=== Commentary on Avot ===
Only small fragments of his commentary on Pirkei Avot have reached us. From these it can be inferred that the commentary covered the entire tractate. It displays his great familiarity with scripture.

== Death ==
Rabbi Meshulam died in Mainz and is buried in the Old Jewish Cemetery. His tombstone, dated to the 11th century, which replaced the earlier, lost stone, is now in the Memorial Cemetery.
