= Moses of Kiev =

Moses of Kiev was a Jewish Talmudist who lived in the first half of the 12th century. Moses seems to have been in western Europe in consequence of the expulsion of the Jews from Kiev in 1124 (comp. Firkowitz in Ha-Karmel, ii.407). It is not impossible that he was a pupil of Jacob b. Meïr Tam, whom he seems to have known (see Tam's Sefer ha-Yashar, No. 522, p. 29a). From Rus' Moses carried on a correspondence with Samuel ben Ali, the head of the Babylonian academy, and through Moses Western scholars learned of an important legal decision of the Geonim which had been communicated to him by Samuel (Responsa of Meïr b. Baruch of Rothenburg, ed. Bloch, No. 494). Another responsum from Samuel to Moses is found in the manuscript Yiḥuse Tanna'im wa-Amora'im, whose author is Judah ben Kalonymus ben Meir of Speyer. Whether or not this Moses is identical with "Rabbi Moses the Russian", whom the author of Sefer ha-Shoham mentions, is doubtful.

== Bibliography ==
- Epstein, Das Talmudische Lexicon, etc., in Monatsschrift, xxxix. 511 (also printed separately);
- idem, in Monatsschrift, xl.134.
