= David Kalonymus ben Jacob =

Italian astrologer

David Kalonymus ben Jacob (David ben Jacob Meïr) was an Italian Jewish astrologer of the fifteenth century, and a member of the Kalonymus family.

He wrote in 1464 two astrological treatises, the smaller of which is on the conjunction of Saturn and Jupiter. He dedicated the latter work to King Ferdinand I of Naples, and hoped thereby to obtain religious liberty for his coreligionists.

In 1466 David translated from Latin into Hebrew an astronomical work of John of Gmünd, which he called Mar'ot ha-Kokabim ("The Aspects of the Stars"). The work is a description of an astronomical instrument which had been invented at Vienna in 1417. He was invested by the king with an office, probably that of astrologer.

In 1484 he wrote a philosophical treatise on the Destructio Destructionis of Averroes, which he addressed to his son Ḥayyim Kalonymus.
