= Moses ben Kalonymus =

11th-century Italian liturgical poet

Rabbi Moses ben Kalonymus was a 10th-century paytan (liturgical poet) born in northern Italy who immigrated to Mainz. His piyyutim were influenced by the Land of Israel liturgical tradition. There is an ancient tradition that he was the composer of the piyyut "Eimat Noratekha" which is recited on Shevi'i shel Pesach.

He wrote of himself in one of his piyyutim "I have now devoured death for more than nine hundred years, I waited to see salvation" from which we learn that he lived 900 years after the destruction of the Second Temple (around 970 CE).

The Shabbat songs Menucha veSimcha and Kol Meqadesh Shevi'i were both composed by a paytan named Moses, as hinted in the acrostic. Some have conjectured that both were composed by the same poet, Rabbi Moses ben Kalonymus.

R' Moses was from the Kalonymos family which played an important role in the spiritual development of northern Italy and Germany, composing piyyutim and halakhic works. Notable among the family was Rabbi Meshullam ben Kalonymus. They transmitted the Ashkenazi mystical tradition from generation to generation. According to Joseph Solomon Delmedigo, Moses received that tradition from Aaron ben Samuel ha-Nasi, who emigrated from Babylon to Europe. Rabbeinu Gershom Meor HaGolah was a student of Moses's students.

== Eimat Noratekha ==
Sources describing the migration of the Kalonymus family mention that Moses was the author of the "Imat Noraoteikh." The piyyut itself also mentions the author as "Moses bar Kalonymush" and the most common understanding is that it refers to this Moses ben Kalonymus, who immigrated from Italy to Mainz.

However, some have questioned this assumption based on a mention of a sage named Hananel Kalonymush. Solomon Judah Loeb Rapoport argues that Hananel was the son of a later Kalonymus sage who lived in Mainz around 1020, and had two sons – Moses and Hananel. Moses was the primary writer, and Hananel his brother helped. He says the mention of "Hananel bar Kalonymus" refers to "Hananel ben Rabbi Kalonymus". However, Avraham Grossman rejects this hypothesis and maintains the author was the first Moses ben Kalonymus. The mention of Hananel does not preclude that possibility, and there may have been another unknown son in the family named Hananel who lived at that time.

== Family members to 1080 ==
Family tree to 1080

Meshullam I. (780)
Ithiel I. (800)
Meshullam II. (825)
Moses I. (850)
Jekuthiel I. (876)
Kalonymus I. (900)
Moses II. (926)
Jekuthiel II.	Kalonymus II. (950)
Meshullam the Great of Rome or Lucca (976)
Kalonymus III. (1000)
Hananeel I.	Moses III. (1020)
Kalonymus IV.	Hananeel II.	Ithiel II.	Jekuthiel of Speyer (fl. 1070)
Moses IV. (1060)
Moses V. of Speyer (1070)
Meshullam of Mainz (1080)

Notes:

(after the Jewish Encyclopedia, 1906)
