= Amnon of Mainz =

Legendary Jewish figure

Amnon of Mainz or Amnon of Mayence is the subject of a medieval legend that became very popular. It tells of Rabbi Amnon, of Mainz (Mayence), Germany, in the 11th century, whom the Archbishop of Mainz, at various times, tried to convert to Christianity. On one occasion Amnon evasively asked to be given three days' time for consideration, but when he left the Archbishop's palace he immediately regretted even appearing to waver in his Jewish faith. When he failed to appear on the appointed day, the archbishop had him brought guarded into his presence. Amnon, rebuked for his failure to keep his promise, pleaded guilty, and said that his tongue should be amputated, because it had expressed a doubt as to the truth of Judaism. The archbishop, however, pronounced the sentence that Amnon's feet, which had refused to come, and his hands, be cut off. This was accordingly done.

Amnon gave orders that he be carried into the synagogue, where Rosh Hashanah was being observed. The reader was about to begin the Kedushah, when he was asked by Amnon to wait. The latter then recited the prayer known as "Unetanneh Tokef," ("Let us tell how overwhelming [is the holiness of this day]") which is a description of the Day of Judgment. No sooner had he finished the prayer than he died. Three days later he appeared to Rabbi Kalonymus (died 1096) in a dream, taught him the prayer, and asked him to spread it throughout all Jewry.

The notes on Asheri, written by Israel of Krems or Kremsier, about 1400. says: The "Unetanneh Tokef" was written by Amnon of Mayence with reference to his own history. He gives Isaac ben Moses of Vienna's work, "Or Zaru'a," as his source. The story, as given above, is found in the Mahzor of the Roman rite for the New Year's Day, published 1541. From it Gedaliah ibn Yahya ben Joseph took it; and the other historians followed him. The Mahzor editions reprinted it; and so the story became very popular. The Russian poet Semyon Frug adapted it into an epic; and Schakschansky wove it into a drama in Yiddish.

In a 2026 essay in The Lehrhaus, Fernando de Beer criticized contemporary devotional retellings that present the Amnon story as historical fact and portray his brief hesitation as culpable, arguing that this use of the legend can function as a warning against religious doubt.

== Sources ==
Jewish Encyclopedia bibliography: Heilprin, Seder ha-Dorot, ed. Maskileison, p. 218, where older sources are quoted Heidenheim's edition of the Mahzor, introduction, where an alphabetical index of the liturgical poets is given; Landshuth, 'Ammude ha-'Abodah, 1857, i. 45.
