= Baruch El Elyon =

Shabbat zemer

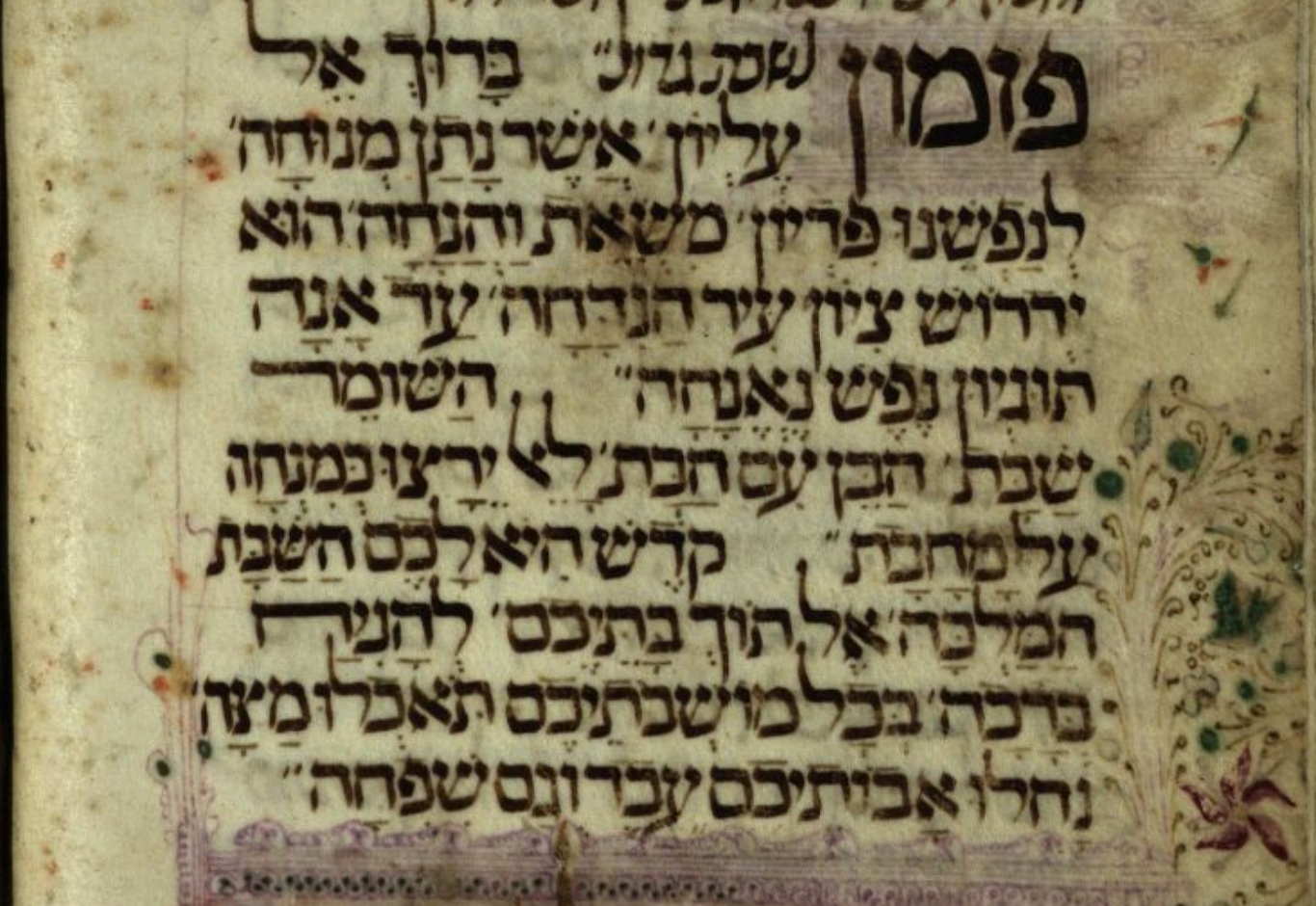
Baruch El Elyon for Shabbat haGadol in a 15th-century Sephardic siddur.

Baruch El Elyon is a piyyut attributed to Baruch ben Samuel of Mainz (c. 1150 – 1221). The poem is acrostically signed "BaRUCH HaZaQ". Among Ashkenazic communities, it is a traditional zemer for Shabbat lunch. Though one manuscript lists it at the end of the order for the Sabbath, Israel Isserlein (1390-1460) already sang it on Sabbath morning.

The poem's theme is singing praises to God, who gave complete physical and mental rest to his people. The payytan describes the joy of Shabbat and its dignity, which is glorified with delicious food and festive clothes, the enormous reward that the keeper of the Sabbath will receive both now and in heaven, the powerful human experience of the Sabbath, the feelings it evokes, and the importance of Shabbat to God.

According to the piyyut, the Sabbath breaks the natural routine of the weekdays and in the process elevates the Jew to another level. The piyyut also recalls that God will redeem his people because of the Sabbath: "Yohanan said that Shimon ben Yochai said, 'If Israel kept two Shabbats appropriately, we would immediately be redeemed'".

== Text ==
The piyyut contains seven verses, each four lines with 12 syllables per line. The first and last verses rhyme on an ABABABAB pattern, while the middle five verses follow an ABABABCD pattern, where C rhymes with A (4x) or B (1x) and D rhymes with the first verse. One 13th-century manuscript of Machzor Vitry contains verses 1, 2, and 4, spelling ברך. One 14th-century fragment includes verses 6-7. Another manuscript of Machzor Vitry contains all seven verses. MS Schocken 22, a machzor for the Jews of Corfu, also includes the piyyut.

Hebrew Original	English translation
בָּרוּךְ אֵל עֶלְיוֹן אֲשֶׁר נָתַן מְנוּחָה לְנַפְשֵׁנוּ פִדְיוֹן מַשְׂאֵת וַהֲנָחָה וְהוּא יִדְרוֹש צִיּוֹן עִיר הַנִּדָּחָה עַד־אָנָה תּוֹגְיוּן נֶפֶשׁ נֶאֱנָחָה. הַשּׁוֹמֵר אֶת הַשַׁבָּת הַבֵּן עִם הַבַּת לָאֵל יֵרָצֶה כְּמִנְחָה עַל מַחֲבַת.	Blessed be El Elyon, who gave rest To our bodies, release, relief, and uplift. He seeks Zion, (Note: The first scribe of the Paris manuscript: "He will rebuild Zion.") the abandoned city, How long will you aggrieve this sad soul? The Sabbath observer, male or female, is pleasing (Note: Many modern printings use the plural form ירצו, "are pleasing"; the 1514 editio princeps uses יהי רצוי,"will be pleasing".) to god like meal on the pan.
רוֹכֵב בָּעֲרָבוֹת מֶלֶךְ עוֹלָמִים אֶת עַמּוֹ לִשְׁבּוֹת אִזֵּן מַנְעַמִּים בְּמַאֲכָלֵי עֲרֵבוֹת מִינֵי מַטְעַמִּים בְּמַלְבּוּשֵׁי כָבוֹד זֶבַח מִשְׁפָּחָה הַשּׁוֹמֵר . . .	Rider (Note: The Paris manuscript: "The rider," which better fits the metre but ruins the acrostic.) on the eves, eternal king, (Note: In the Parma manuscript, "creator of worlds.") His people to rest, he seeks delicacies. (Note: In the Paris manuscript and in printings, בנעימים "He tells his people to rest sweetly." This makes somewhat less sense but fits the metre better.) With sweet foods, variety of dishes, With glorious clothing, a family feast. (Note: Paris first scribe: "sacrifice of meal.") The Sabbath observer . . .
וְאַשְׁרֵי כָל־חוֹכֶה לְתַשְׁלוּמֵי כֵפֶל מֵאֵת כֹּל סוֹכֶה שׁוֹכֵן בָּעֲרָפֶל נַחֲלָה הוּא יִזְכֶּה בָהָר וּבַשָּׁפֶל נַחֲלָה וּמְנוּחָה כַּשֶּׁמֶש לוֹ זָרְחָה הַשּׁוֹמֵר . . .	Happy are all who wait for doubled reward From the all-seeing cloud dweller. He will inherit mountain and valley, Inheritance and rest like the sun rises just for him! The Sabbath observer . . .
כָּל שׁוֹמֵר שַׁבָּת כַּדָּת מֵחַלְּלוֹ הֵן הֶכְשֵׁר חִבַּת קֹדֶשׁ גּוֹרָלוֹ וְאִם יָצָא חוֹבַת הַיּוֹם אַשְרֵי לוֹ אֶל אֵל מְחוֹלְלוֹ מִנְחָה הִיא שְׁלוּחָה הַשּׁוֹמֵר . . .	All who protect the Sabbath properly from desecrators, Preparation by reverence for the Holy is their lot. (Note: In the Parma manuscript, "He pleases God, the love of his lot.") And if he completes the day's obligations, praise him, (Note: In the Parma manuscript, "and if he completes his obligation in everything he has".) To God who made him, (Note: Or perhaps emend: מָחוּל לוֹ "God who pardoned him" after b. Shabbat 118b, PdRE 18:13, etc.) a meal-offering is sent. The Sabbath observer . . .
חֶמְדַּת הַיָּמִים קְרָאוֹ אֵלִי צוּר וְאַשְׁרֵי לִתְמִימִים אִם יִהְיֶה נָצוּר כֶּתֶר יַהֲלֹמִים עַל רֹאשָׁם יָצוּר צוּר הָעוֹלָמִים רוּחוֹ בָם נָחָה הַשּׁוֹמֵר . . .	My god, my Rock, called it the best of days, And praised be the pure ones if it is protected. A jeweled (Note: So the second scribe of Paris. The first scribe of Paris: "הלולים", delights, while printings: "הלומים", "kingship" after the Talmud's statement that אין הלום אלא מלכות; the Talmud also uses ה.ל.מ as a verb meaning coronation in b. AZ 44a and Sanhedrin 21b.) crown he'll set on their heads, The spirit of the Eternal Rock will rest on them. (Note: Paris first scribe: "The Eternal Rock commands rest for him.") The Sabbath observer . . .
זָכוֹר אֶת יוֹם הַשַּׁבָּת לְקַדְּשׁוֹ קַרְנוֹ כִּי גָבְהָה נֵזֶר עַל רֹאשׁוֹ עַל כֵּן יִתֵּן הָאָדָם לְנַפְשׁוֹ עֹנֶג וְגַם שִׂמְחָה בָהֶם לְמָשְׁחָה הַשּׁוֹמֵר . . .	Recall the Sabbath day and sanctify it, His pride raised, a diadem on his head. Therefore does man give (Note: Vienna manuscript: "So does a man live for his body,") to his body, joy and happiness, by which to be anointed. (Note: Vienna: "Joy and also happiness; oil for annointment.") The Sabbath observer . . .
קֹדֶשׁ הִיא לָכֶם שַׁבָּת הַמַּלְכָּה אֶל תּוֹךְ בָּתֵּיכֶם לְהָנִיחַ בְּרָכָה בְּכֹל מֹשְׁבֹתֵיכֶם לֹא תַעֲשׂוּ מְלָאכָה בְּנֵיכֶם וּבְנוֹתֵיכֶם עֶבֶד וְגַם שִׁפְחָה הַשּׁוֹמֵר . . .	Holy to you is the Sabbath queen, Into your houses, to grant blessing. In all your dwellings, do not do melakha, Even your children and your servants. The Sabbath observer . . .

=== Hagadol version ===
An early alternative version of the last verse is found in NLI Ms. Heb. 8°844, a 15th-century Sephardic siddur, where it is marked as a "pizmon for Shabbat Hagadol". The piyyut mentions the commandment to eat matza and the Exodus.

Hagadol version

קֹדֶשׁ הִיא לָכֶם הַשַׁבָּת הַמַּלְכָּה
אֶל תּוֹךְ בָּתֵּיכֶם לְהָנִיחַ בְּרָכָה
בְּכֹל מֹשְׁבֹתֵיכֶם תֹּאכְלוּ מַצָּה
נָחֲלוּ אֲבֹתֵיכֶם עֶבֶד וְגַם שִׁפְחָה

English translation
Holy to you is the Sabbath queen,

Into your houses, to grant blessing.

In all your dwellings, eat matzah,

Your enslaved ancestors all inherited.
