= Mah Navu Alei =

Ma Navu Alei (Hebrew: מַה נָּאווּ עֲלֵי) is a zemer in the Iraqi Jewish tradition. It was composed by Rabbi Shim'on ben Rabbi Nissim in the 19th century in Iraq, and gained widespread popularity among the Iraqi Jewish community. It is sung at most Iraqi simchas and events, in particular at weddings and sheva brachot. The zemer was brought to Israel, where it became part of the standard repertoire of Israeli Jewish music, popular with Jews of all backgrounds.

== Lyrics ==
מַה נָּאווּ עֲלֵי הֶהָרִים רַגְלֵי

מְבַשֵּׂר שָׁלוֹם בְּבִנְיַן עִירֵךְ

קוֹל צוֹפַיִךְ יִשְׂאוּ קוֹל רִנָּה

הִתְנַעֲרִי מִתּוֹךְ מְגִנָּה

עַיִן בְּעַיִן תִּרְאִי שְׁכִינָה

וְשָׁבוּ בָנַיִךְ לִגְבוּלֵךְ

לִשְׁבוּיִים דְּרוֹר בְּשִׁיר וּמִזְמוֹר

אֶל בֵּית הַר הַמּוֹר יְהִי שְׁבִילֵךְ

סֹלוּ סֹלוּ אֶת הַמְּסִלָּה

פִּצְחוּ רְנָנָה וּתְהִלָּה

יָבֺא מְבַשֵּׂר בִּלְשׁוֹנוֹ מִלָּה

קוּמִי עוּרִי כִּי בָא אוֹרֵךְ

צְאִי מִבָּבֶל קִרְיַת עוֹבְדֵי בֵל

כִּנּוֹר וָנֵבֶל אָז יְהִי שִׁירֵךְ

שׂוֹשׂ יָשִׂישׂוּ כָּל אֲבֵלֵי צִיּוֹן

לָבֺא לַחֲסוֹת בְּצֵל הָעֶלְיוֹן

בָּנֺה אֶבְנֶה לָךְ נְוֵה אַפּרְיוֹן

אָכִין כִּסֵּא לְדָוִד מַלְכֵּךְ

שְׂאִי עֵינַיךְ וּרְאִי בָנַיִךְ

בָּאוּ אֵלַיִךְ לָאוֹר בְּאוֹרֵךְ

תַּחַת חשֶֺׁך אָשִׂים לָךְ אוֹרָה

אָז מִצִּיּוֹן תֵּצֵא הַתּוֹרָה

הִנֵּה גָדוֹל הוּא אָיֺם וְנוֹרָא

בְּיוֹם שִׂימִי כֶתֶר לְרֺאשֵׁךְ

עַד מָתַי כַּלָּה יָפָה וּמְעֻלָּה

לְזָּר בְּעוּלָה כְּדַל וָהֵלֶךְ

עוּרִי עוּרִי עֲדַת יִשְׂרָאֵל

אָחִישׁ אֶשְׁלַח יִנּוֹן וְגוֹאֵל

וְגַם אָקִים לָךְ חוֹמַת אֲרִיאֵל

זָכֹר אֶזְכֹּר חֶסֶד נְעוּרֵךְ
