= Kalonymus ben Meshullam =

German Jewish martyr

Kalonymus Ben Meshullam was a French Jew of the Kalonymus family the son of Meshullam ben Kalonymus.

He was head of the Jewish community of Mainz at the time of the Rhineland massacres. He is said to have sent a messenger to King Henry IV in Italy, in consequence of which the king promulgated an order throughout his realm to the effect that the Jews were not to be molested. On 27 May 1096, however, Kalonymus led fifty-three other Jews, who had taken refuge from the Crusaders in the palace of Bishop Adalbert II of Worms, to meet the invaders in battle (led by Count Emicho) during the Worms massacre.

A provenance of the teachings of the Kalonymides (c.1220) by Eleazar of Worms indicates that Samuel of Speyer (father of Judah “the Pious” of Regensburg) may have been a son a of Kalonymous Ben Meshullam.
