= Ki Eshm'ra Shabbat =

Jewish Sabbath hymn

Ki Eshm'ra Shabbat is a popular Sabbath hymn, composed in the 12th century by Abraham ibn Ezra. Though historically a song for Sabbath eve, today it is usually sung at Sabbath lunch.

The hymn discusses which acts are appropriate, and which inappropriate, for the Sabbath. It contains five stanzas, the first letters of which spell the author's first name "Abraham" by acrostic. The refrain is "Because I will keep the Sabbath, God will protect me; it is an eternal sign between Him and me".

== Form ==
The piyyut is in an a/a/b/b/b/a form. Its meter appears thus: [— — ◡ — — — | — — ◡ — —]. Depending on the tune used, it may be classified as a zajal.

== Text ==
Hebrew Original	English translation
אסור מצוא חפץ לעשות דרכים בו גם לדבר בו דברי מלכים דברי סחורה או דברי צרכים אהגה בתורת אל ותחכמני כי אשמרה שבת אל ישמרני אות היא לעולמי עד בינו וביני	Forbidden is business, to journey, (Note: In some MSS, "business and journeying") On it (Note: Some MSS lack this word.) also to speak on it of government, Words of sale or necessities. (Note: In some MSS, the words "necessities" and "government" are reversed.) I will sigh over God's law, and be made wise. Because I will keep the Sabbath, God will protect me; it is an eternal sign between Him and me.
בו אמצא(ה) תמיד נוח לנפשי הנה לדור ראשון נתן קדושי מופת בתת (נ"א נתת) לחם משנה בשישי ככה בכל ששי יכפיל מזוני כי אשמרה שבת . . .	On it (Note: In some manuscripts, "For I will . . ." This does not fit the acrostic.) I will always find rest (Note: In some MSS, "rejuvenation".) for my body. Behold to the first generation I gave my holy. Signaled by Friday's doubled manna, So on every Friday my meal will be doubled. Because I will keep the Sabbath . . .
רשם בדת היום חוק אל סגניו בו לערוך לחם פנים לפניו כן בו להתענות על פי נבוניו אסור לבד מיום כיפור עווני כי אשמרה שבת . . .	Set into the day's code, a law for His ministers: On it to set showbread before Him. (Note: In some MSS, "On it always to set bread before Him") So on it to fast, so His sages say, (Note: MSS variants: "Therefore to abstain", "Also on it to abstain", ". . . to abstain on it".) Is forbidden except on Yom Kippur. Because I will keep the Sabbath . . .
הוא יום מכובד הוא יום תענוגים לחם ויין טוב בשר ודגים (ה)מתאבלים בו אחור נסוגים כי יום שמחות הוא וישמחני כי אשמרה שבת . . .	It is a glorious day, it is a day of delights, Good food and drink, meat and fish. Those (Note: Variant: "All those . . .") who mourn it are backwards, For it is a day of joys, and he will cheer me! Because I will keep the Sabbath . . .
מחל מלאכה בו סופו להכרית על כן אכבס בו לבי כבורית (ו)אתפללה אל אל (נ"א לאל) ערבית ושחרית מוסף וגם מנחה כי תענני כי אשמרה שבת . . .	Who desecrates it with work (Note: Variant: "Who begins work . . .") will be erased in the end, Therefore I bathe for it, (Note: Variant: "I glorify on it") my heart like soap. I pray to God Maariv, Shacharit, Mussaf, and Mincha, "For you will answer me". (Note: Variants: "For He will answer me," "And He will answer me".) Because I will keep the Sabbath . . .

== In Jewish culture ==
The poem has historically been a locus of intercommunal Rabbanite-Karaite dissent. Ibn Ezra, a Rabbinic Jew who opposed Karaite Judaism, incorporated some of his anti-Karaite beliefs in the text, visible primarily in the lyrics exhorting joy and pleasure on Shabbat (whereas Karaite doctrine requires a sombre and mournful approach on the sabbath, out of reverence for the loss of Jerusalem and the exile of Jews from their homeland). However, the piyyut remained popular among Karaites, and some Karaite prayerbooks changed the lyrics of the piyyut to better reflect their doctrine. For example, a Karaite version states that "the ones who have intercourse on [Shabbat] are retrograde," in opposition to the Rabbinic stance that intimacy on Shabbat is a mitzvah - the Karaite position is that sex constitutes work, which is forbidden on the sabbath.
