= Kalonymos family =

Prominent medieval Jewish family

Kalonymos or Kalonymus (Hebrew: קָלוֹנִימוּס Qālōnīmūs) is a Jewish family originating from Lucca, Arles and Narbonne. The Kalomynos had different unrelated branches in Southern France Occitania, Catalonia and Northern Italy. Having settled in Mainz and Speyer, these several branches of this family sharing the same surname became prominent in the development of Jewish learning in Germany.

== Name ==
The name should technically be spelled "Kalonymos," as Kalonymus ben Kalonymus and Immanuel the Roman both rhyme it with words ending in "-mos". The name, which occurs in Greece, Italy, and Provence, is of Greek origin; Kalonymos (Ancient Greek: Kαλώνυμος) means "beautiful name" and Wolf pointed that it is a translation of the Hebrew "Shem-Tov"; Zunz, that it represented the Latin "Cleonymus".

== Early history ==
The ancestors of the Kalonymos family are said to have left Judea after the Siege of Jerusalem (70 CE) and fled to southern Italy. This was told by early members of the family and has not been corroborated outside of Oral Tradition.

Traces of the family in Italy may be found as early as the second half of the eighth century. As to the date of the settlement of its members in Germany, the opinions of modern scholars are divided, owing to the conflicting statements of the Jewish sources.

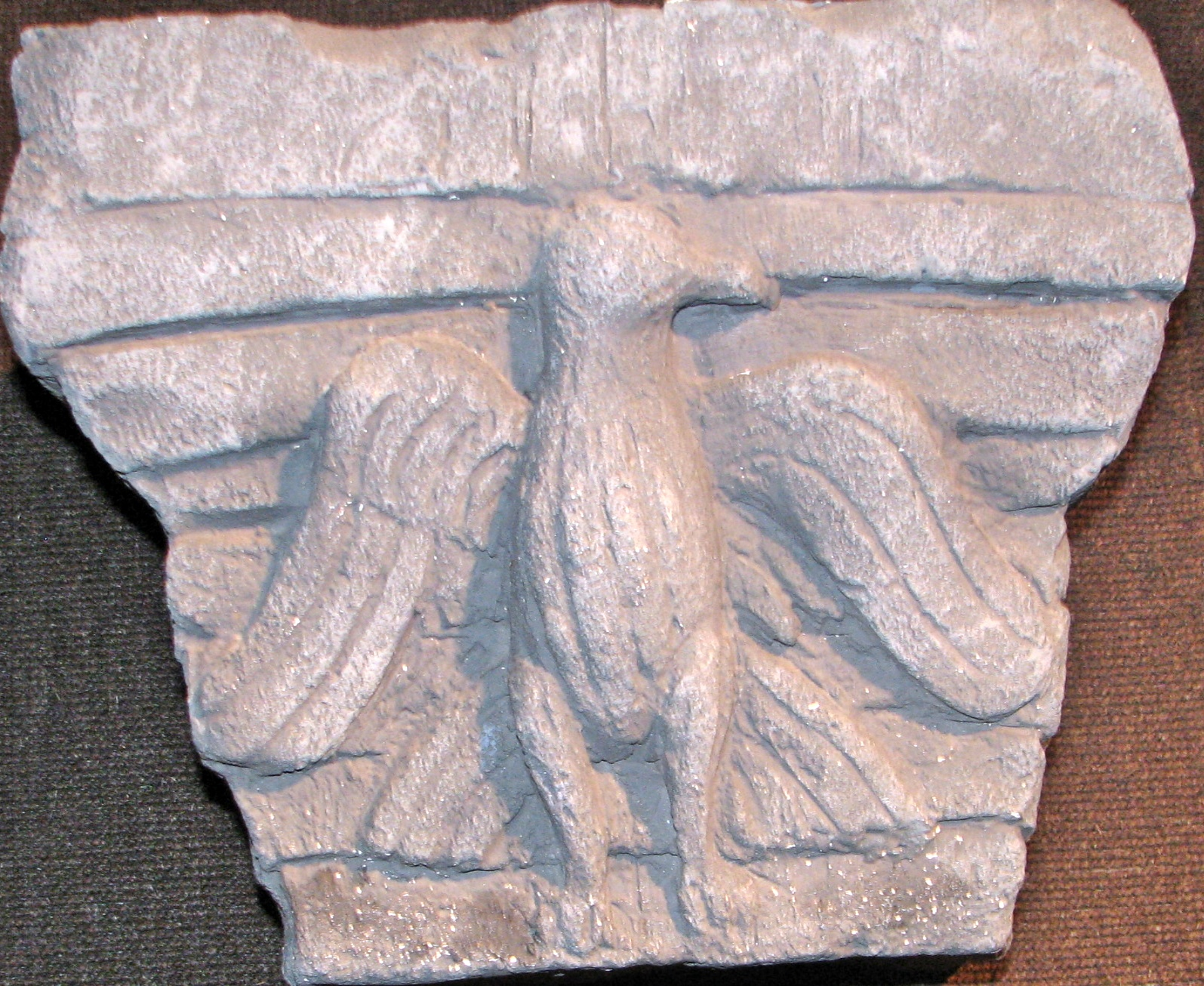
A replica of the capital of the pillar from Kalonymous house, Mainz (10th century)

Rapoport, Leopold Zunz, and many others place the settlement in 876, believing the King Charles, mentioned in the sources as having induced the Kalonymides to emigrate to Germany, to have been Charles the Bald, who was in Italy in that year; Luzzatto and others think that it took place under Charlemagne, in approximately 800 CE, alleging that the desire to attract scholars to the empire was more in keeping with the character of that monarch. The following table, compiled from the accounts of Eleazar of Worms and Solomon Luria, gives the Italian and German heads of the family, which produced for nearly five centuries the most notable scholars of Germany and northern France, such as Samuel he-Hasid and his son Judah he-Hasid. Although all of them are mentioned as having been important scholars, the nature of the activity of only a few of them is known.

== Family members to 1080 ==
Family tree to 1080

Meshullam I. (780)
Ithiel I. (800)
Meshullam II. (825)
Moses I. (850)
Jekuthiel I. (876)
Kalonymus I. (900)
Moses II. (926)
Jekuthiel II.	Kalonymus II. (950)
Meshullam the Great of Rome or Lucca (976)
Kalonymus III. (1000)
Hananeel I.	Moses ben Kalonymus (1020)
Kalonymus IV.	Hananeel II.	Ithiel II.	Jekuthiel of Speyer (fl. 1070)
Moses IV. (1060)
Moses V. of Speyer (1070)
Meshullam of Mainz (1080)

Notes:

(after the Jewish Encyclopedia, 1906)

=== Ithiel I. ===
A short selicha in eight strophes, beginning with תבלת משחרי בניך, bears the name of Ithiel without any other indication as to its authorship. It was translated into German by Zunz.

=== Moses I. (ben Meshullam) ===
Liturgical poet; lived at Rome or at Lucca about 850. Two tahanunim of his are incorporated in the Mahzor: one, beginning with אנא ה' אלקי תשועתי, comprises thirty-eight lines of four words each; the other, beginning with מקור ישראל, consists of forty-six lines, with a double acrostic on the name of the author at the beginning of the line; translated into German by Zunz ("S. P." p. 193).

=== Kalonymus II. (ben Moses) ===
Halakhist and liturgical poet; flourished at Lucca or at Rome about 950. He was consulted on ritual questions by Rabbenu Gershom; and twelve responsa of his are included in the collection compiled by Joseph ben Samuel Tob Alam and published by D. Cassel under the title "Teshubot Geonim Kadmonim" (Nos. 106–118). Rabbenu Gershom remarks that there exists in rabbinical literature a confusion concerning the identity of Kalonymus and his son Meshullam the Great, and the saying of one is sometimes attributed to the other. Thus Rashi quotes three emendations in the Talmudical text in the name of R. Meshullam, while Rabbeinu Tam gives them in the name of R. Kalonymus. Kalonymus was the author of a kerovah for feast-days. To him probably belong the rehitim מי לא יראך which bear the signature "Kalonymus" or "Kalonymus the Elder." Eleazer of Worms attributes also to him the piyyut מלכותו בקהל עדתו.

=== Meshullam the Great ===
Meshullam the Great, called also the Roman, was a halakhist and liturgical poet; flourished at Rome or at Lucca about 976. He carried on with Rabbeinu Gershom and Simon the Great a scientific correspondence, which is included in the "Teshuvot Geonim Kadmonim" (13a), and was the author of a commentary on Avot Meshullam engaged in polemics with the Karaites. From the Bible text he demonstrates that, contrary to their opinion, one may quit one's house on Shabbat and have one's house lighted on the night of Shabbat.

Meshullam was a prolific liturgical poet. Of the piyyutim contained in the kerovah of the "Shacharit" service of the Day of Atonement, at least twenty (possibly thirty-two) belong to him. He wrote also: an "'Avodah," recited after the prayer for the synagogue reader and containing a cursory review of Biblical history from Adam down to Levi; a yoẓer for Passover; and two zulot. Altogether thirty-eight piyyuṭim are attributed to him. Although their language is labored, they are distinguished by their elevation of thought and conciseness.

=== Kalonymus III. (ben Meshullam) ===
Kalonymus ben Meshullam, Liturgical poet; flourished at Mainz about 1000. He figures in the Amnon legend as having written the Unetanneh Tokef, which had been revealed to him in a dream by the martyr Amnon of Mainz.

=== Hananeel I. ben Kalonymus ===
Liturgical poet; flourished at Mainz or Speyer in the eleventh century; brother of Moses III. He was the author of the piyyut חרשו יושבי חרושת to the kerovot of the last day of Passover, to which his brother wrote the אימת נוראותיך.

=== Moses ben Kalonymus ===
Liturgical poet; flourished at Mainz in 1020. He was the author of אימת נוראותיך and of a kerovah consisting of various poems for the seventh day of Passover, which used to be recited in the congregations of Mainz. Citations from several of the ḳerovah poems are given in various earlier Bible commentaries. (On the confusion existing in the rabbinical sources concerning the identity of the author of the לאימת נוראותיך, see Zunz)

=== Yekuthiel ben Moses ===
Liturgical poet; flourished at Speyer in 1070. He was the author of the reshut יראתי to Kalir's kerovah for Rosh Hashanah. A son of Yekuthiel named Moses of Speyer is quoted as a high Talmudical authority.

=== Meshullam ben Moses ===
Liturgical poet; lived at Mainz in 1080. He was the author of the following five piyyutim. Meshullam was among those who killed themselves May 27, 1096, in order not to fall into the hands of the Crusaders.

== Kalonymus ben Isaac the Elder ==
German halachist; lived at Speyer in the eleventh and twelfth centuries; father of Samuel he-Hasid, grandfather of Judah he-Hasid, and great-grandfather of Judah ben Kalonymus, as the following pedigree shows:

Pedigree

Kalonymus ben Isaac the Elder (d. 1126)
Samuel he Hasid	Judah	Meir
Golde	Abraham	Judah he Hasid (d. 1217)	Kalonymus (c. 1160)	Daughter	Kalonymus "ha-Parnas"	Moses	Samuel
Eleazer ha- Darshan (c.1240)	Moses Zaltman	Meir	Judah	David	Simcha (c. 1223)
Moses Azriel ha-Darshan (c.1280)	Tobiah	Meshullam (c.1240)

Notes:

He was the grandson of Eliezer ben Isaac ha-Gadol.

Kalonymus is quoted in the Tosafot (Hullin 47b), and a responsum of his is included in the collection of responsa of Meir of Rothenburg (No. 501). From the account of Kalonymus given in the "Mordechai" (Pesachim, end), in the "Pardes" (§§ 75, 88, 245, 290), and in the "Mazref la-Hokmah" (p. 14a), it may be inferred that he was rabbi in Mainz, and that during the First Crusade (1096) he was compelled to flee to Speyer. He died in December, 1127. His body could not be buried because of the investment of the city by Lothar, the burial-ground being outside of the place. At a later time it was interred at Mainz.

== Kalonymus ben Judah ==
Kalonymus ben Judah or Kalonymus the Elder lived in Mainz at the beginning of the twelfth century. He was a contemporary of Eliakim ben Joseph, the teacher of Eleazar ben Nathan (RaBaN).

== Kalonymus ben Judah or Kalonymus the Younger ==
Liturgical poet; flourished at Speyer (?) about 1160; probably a grandson of Kalonymus ben Isaac the Elder. He was a contemporary of Isaac ben Shalom, grandfather of Isaac Or Zarua, and was the author of many liturgical poems in various styles, e.g., ofan, zulat, and reshut, and especially of seliḥot. Thirty of his poetical productions have been incorporated in the Maḥzor. Among his selichot the most noteworthy are the Seder of Pesach, in which the author describes the readiness shown by the Jews, in the persecutions of the Crusades, to die for the faith of their fathers; the kinah מי יתן את הקול, on the sufferings of the Jews during the persecutions of 1147 ("Monatsschrift," xx. 257); and ראשי מים, on the fate of the Jews from the times of the Pharaohs to the destruction of the Temple by Titus. The whole of the first selicha and the end of the second have been translated into German by Leopold Zunz.

== More members ==
More members of the Kalonymus family, who have pages for themselves.

- Kalonymus ben Kalonymus
- David Kalonymus ben Jacob
- Isaac Nathan ben Kalonymus
- Kalonymus ben Todros
- Eleazar ben Judah ben Kalonymus
- Judah ben Kalonymus ben Moses
- Judah ben Kalonymus ben Meir

== Bibliography ==
: Richard Gottheil, Isaac Broydé KALONYMUS

- Rapoport, in Bikkure ha-'Ittim, x. 40 et seq., 111 et seq.; xi. 100;
- Carmoly, in Jost's Annalen, i. 222;
- Luzzatto, Giudaismo Illustrato, p. 30;
- Zunz, G. V. Index;
- idem, Literaturgesch. Index;
- idem, Z. G. Index;
- Monatsschrift, 1854, pp. 236 et seq.; 1878, pp. 250 et seq.;
- Grätz, Gesch. v. 193;
- Güdemann, Gesch. i. 11 et seq.;
- Giesebrecht, Kaiserzeit, i. 849;
- Bresslau, in Zeitschrift für die Gesch. der Juden in Deutschland, i. 156 et seq.;
- Aronius, ib. ii. 82 et seq.;
- Vogelstein and Rieger, Gesch. der Juden in Rom, i. 139.G. I. Br.
