= Kol Meqadesh Shevi'i =

Hebrew hymn

"Kol Meqadesh Shevi'i" (Note: Also: Kol Mekadesh, Kol Mekadeish) is an ancient hymn, possibly composed by Moses ben Kalonymus. The hymn is first found in Add MS 27200, a 13th-century copy of the 11th-century Machzor Vitry, as the first hymn for the Sabbath; because the section with hymns does not appear in superior copies of Machzor Vitry, it is likely a later addition. Over the generations it has been set to many tunes. Ashkenazi Jews customarily sing it on Sabbath Eve, usually omitting the last stanza (see below).

Each stanza has four lines; the first three continue the acrostic and the fourth is a Biblical verse or verset.

== Words ==
Original Hebrew	Transliteration	Literal Translation	Poetic Translation of Herbert Loewe
כָּל מְקַדֵּשׁ שְׁבִיעִי כָּרָאוּי לוֹ כָּל שׁוֹמֵר שַׁבָּת מֵחַלְּלוֹ שְׂכָרוֹ הַרְבֵּה מְאֹד עַל פִּי פָעֳלוֹ אִישׁ עַל מַחֲנֵהוּ וְאִישׁ עַל דִּגְלוֹ	kol mǝqaddēš šǝbîʿî kārāʾûy lô kol šômēr šabbāt mēḥallǝlô śǝkārô harbê mǝʾōd ʿal pî poʿŏlô ʾîš ʿal maḥănēhû wǝʾîš ʿal diglô	All who sanctify the Sabbath as it deserves All who protect the Sabbath from its breakers (Note: Prayerbooks insert "according to the law.") His reward is very great, correspondent to his act, "Each according to his camp, and each according to his flag." (Note: Numbers 1:52)	Who duly keeps Sabbath, who welcomes the Bride, Who truly protects her, God's Law for his guide, A guerdon as Abram's his faith shall provide: So inch, in your tents, 'neath your banners abide.
אוֹהֲבֵי ה' הַמְחַכִּים בְּבִנְיַן אֲרִיאֵל בְּיוֹם הַשַׁבָּת שִׂישׂוּ כִּמְקַבְּלֵי מַתַּן נַחֲלִיאֵל גַּם שְׂאוּ יְדֵיכֶם קוֹדֶשׁ וְאִמְרוּ לָאֵל בָּרוּךְ ה' אֲשֶׁר נָתַן מְנוּחָה לְעַמּוֹ יִשְׂרָאֵל	ʾôhăbê h' hamǝḥakkîm bǝbinyan ʾărîʾēl bǝyôm hašabbāt śîśû kimqabbǝlê mattan naḥălîʾēl gam śǝʾû yǝdêkem qôdeš wǝʾimrû lāʾēl bārûk h' ʾăšer nātan mǝnûḥâ lǝʿammô yiśrāʾēl	Lovers of God, who hope for the rebuilding of Ariel (Note: This phrase comes from Yannai's Sanctifications for the sabbaths of tragedy and comfort.) On the Sabbath, celebrate (Note: Prayerbooks insert "and rejoice.") like they who received the gift of Nahaliel. (Note: viz. the Torah. Thus b. Eruvin 54a's homiletical interpretation of Numbers 21:19. MSS London reads "gift of Nahaliel's law".) Also lift up your hands toward the Holy (Note: Psalms 134:2) and say to God, "Blessed is the LORD who gave (Note: A scribal error in Add MS 27200 leaves out "gave.") rest to his people Israel." (Note: 1 Kings 8:56)	Who yearn for Ariel rebuilded once more, Take Sabbath in joy from the Torah's rich store, Come, lovers of God, let us praise and adore Our God Who gave rest to His people of yore.
דוֹרְשֵׁי ה' זֶרַע אַבְרָהָם אוֹהֲבוֹ הַמְאַחֲרִים לָצֵאת מִן הַשַּׁבָּת וּמְמַהֲרִים לָבֹא וּשְׂמֵחִים לְשָׁמְרוֹ וְלַעֲרוֹב מַעֲרָבוֹ זֶה הַיּוֹם עָשָׂה ה' נָגִילָה וְנִשְׂמְחָה בוֹ	dôrǝšê h' zeraʿ ʾabrāhām ʾôhăbô hamǝʾaḥărîm lāṣēʾt min haššabbāt ûmǝmahărîm lābōʾ ûśǝmēḥîm lǝšāmǝrô wǝlaʿărôb maʿărābô zê hayyôm ʿāśâ h' nāgîlâ wǝniśmǝḥâ bô	Seekers of God, seed of Abraham his beloved, Who delay ending the Sabbath, and hurry to begin it. (Note: A scribal error in Add MS 27200 has "Who delay ending the Sabbath, and delay beginning it.") And who are happy to keep it, and to prepare its meals. (Note: So Add MS 27200; the prayerbooks, having missed this reference to Ez. 27:9, emend "to make its eruv". The phrase in Ezekiel is to be literally translated "to sell wares;" see however the commentary of Joseph Kara, "To sell wares (ערב) . . . this means to repair and support. All the necessities of life are pleasurable, so one's support is called pleasure (ערב). And all man's pleasure is in food and drink".) "This is the day which God made -- celebrate and rejoice on it!" (Note: Psalms 118:24)	O seek Him, ye children of Abram His friend, Be glad Sabbath's frontiers and bounds to defend, Too late is her coming, too soon is her end, This day of God's making: let gladness ascend!
זִכְרוּ תּוֹרַת משֶׁה כְּמִצְוַת שַׁבָּת גְּרוּשָׁה חֲרוּתָה בַּיוֹם הַשְּׁבִיעִי כְּכַלָּה בֵּין רֵעוֹתֶיהָ טְהוֹרִים יִירָשׁוּהָ וִיקַדְּשׁוּהָ כְּמַאֲמַר אֵל רָם וְנִשָּׂא וַיְכַל אֱלֹהִים בַּיּוֹם הַשְּׁבִיעִי מְלַאכְתּוֹ אֲשֶׁר עָשָׂה	zikrû tôrat mšê kǝmiṣwat šabbāt gǝrûšâ ḥărûtâ lǝyôm haššǝbîʿî kǝkallâ bên rēʿôtêhā ṭǝhôrîm yîrāšûhā wîqaddǝšûhā kǝmaʾămar ʾēl rām wǝniśśāʾ wayǝkal ʾĕlōhîm bayyôm haššǝbîʿî mǝlaʾktô ʾăšer ʿāśâ	Recall the Law of Moses -- (Note: In Add MS 27200, "of Moses my servant".) the Sabbath commandment is like a divorcée, (Note: In some texts, "which records the Sabbath commandment".) Veiled on the seventh day like a bride between her maids. (Note: In some versions of b. Ketubot 17b, a חריתא is a sort of bridal headdress. In Add MS 27200, "her 'two' maids"; in the Vienna and Parma MSS, "for the seventh day." This image already appears in Kalir's Kinot. In some texts, "arrayed between her maids".) The pure will inherit her, (Note: In one manuscript, "Pure are her inheritors") and sanctify her as ordered by the god on high, (Note: In some texts, "By saying, 'all that he did.'") "And God completed on the seventh day all the work which he had done." (Note: Genesis 2:2)	God's Law gave us Sabbath His Law be obeyed A bride 'mid her maids in fair samite arrayed; The pure are her heirs, they proclaim as 'tis said "God rested and blessed all His works He had made."
יוֹם קָדוֹשׁ הוּא מִבּוֹאוֹ וְעַד צֵאתוֹ כָּל זֶרַע יַעֲקֹב יְכַבְּדוּהוּ כִּדְבַר הַמֶּלֶךְ וְדָתוֹ לָנוּחַ בּוֹ וְלִשְׂמוֹחַ בְּתַעֲנוּג אָכוֹל וְשָׁתוֹ כָּל עֲדַת יִשְׂרָאֵל יַעֲשׂוּ אוֹתוֹ	yôm qādôš hûʾ mibbôʾô wǝʿad ṣēʾtô kol zeraʿ yaʿăqōb yǝkabbǝdûhû kidbar hammelek wǝdātô lānûaḥ bô wǝliśmôaḥ bǝtaʿănûg ʾākôl wǝšātô kol ʿădat yiśrāʾēl yaʿăśû ʾôtô	A holy day is it, (Note: In Add MS 27200, "A holy day is this".) from its arrival to its departure All the seed of Jacob (Note: In Add MS 27200, "all Israel.") glorify it according to royal decree To rest on it and to celebrate in luxury—eat and drink! (Note: Add MS 27200 adds, "on the Sabbath.") "All the community of Israel will do this." (Note: Exodus 12:47)	All holy her night and all holy her day: Then come, sons of Jacob, your King's word obey Rejoice o'er your flagons, with feasting be gay, All Israel united to rest and to pray.
מְשֹׁךְ חַסְדְּךָ לְיֹדְעֶיךָ אֵל קַנֹּא וְנוֹקֵם נוֹטְרֵי יּוֹם הַשְּׁבִיעִי זָכוֹר וְשָׁמוֹר לְהָקֵם שַׂמְּחֵם בְּבִנְיַן שָׁלֵם בְּאוֹר פָּנֶיךָ תַּבְהִיקֵם יִרְוְיֻן מִדֶּשֶׁן בֵּיתֶךָ וְנַחַל עֲדָנֶיךָ תַשְׁקֵם	mǝšōk ḥasdǝkā lǝyōdǝʿêkā ʾēl qannōʾ wǝnôqēm nôṭǝrê yôm haššǝbîʿî zākôr wǝšāmôr lǝhāqēm śammǝḥēm bǝbinyan šālēm bǝʾôr pānêkā tabhîqēm yirwǝyūn middešen bêtekā wǝnaḥal ʿădānêkā tašqēm	Disburse charity to those who recognize you, (Note: cf. Psalms 36:11) O jealous and vengeful God, Those watching for the seventh day, to establish "recall" and "keep". (Note: Add MS 27200 reads, "They celebrate . . .")Gladden them with the complete building, (Note: Some inaccurately translate "building of [Jeru]salem." The phrase comes from Yannai's Sanctifications for the sabbaths of tragedy and comfort. "You caused grief/ You will make joy/ You destroyed/ You will build/ A complete building/ A full building/ A surpassing building/ A settled building/ A set building/ A solid building/ An established building/ A finished building." This line is also quoted by Moses b. Asher in the colophon to Codex Cairensis.) by the light of your face illuminate them "They will overflow with the abundance of your houses, and with your delicious spring you will water them." (Note: Psalms 36:9)	Who know Thee, who guard Sabbath's twofold behest, O grant them Thy mercy, O shorten their quest For Salem rebuilt; in Thy light be they blest, By Thy streams of delight bring them safely to rest.
עֲזוֹר (לַ)שּׁוֹבְתִים בַּשְּׁבִיעִי בֶּחָרִישׁ וּבַקָּצִיר עוֹלָמִים פּוֹסְעִים (בּוֹ) פְּסִיעָה קְטַנָּה, סוֹעֲדִים בּוֹ לְבָרֵךְ שָׁלשׁ פְּעָמִים צִדְקָתָם תַּצְהִיר כְּאוֹר שִׁבְעַת הַיָּמִים ה' אֱלֹהֵי יִשְׂרָאֵל הָבָה תָמִים (ה' אֱלֹהֵי יִשְׂרָאֵל תְּשׁוּעַת עוֹלָמִים)	ʿăzôr (lašôbǝtîm) baššǝbîʿî beḥārîš ûbaqqāṣîr ʿôlāmîm pôsǝʿîm (bô) pǝsîʿâ qǝṭannâ, sôʿădîm bô lǝbārēk šālš pǝʿāmîm ṣidqātām taṣhîr kǝʾôr šibʿat hayyāmîm h' ʾĕlōhê yiśrāʾēl hābâ tāmîm (h' ʾĕlōhê yiśrāʾēl tǝšûʿat ʿôlāmîm)	Help those who keep the Sabbath on the seventh, in plowing and in harvest forever (Note: cf. Exodus 34:21) They take on it a small step, (Note: b. Shabbat 113b rules that one should not take large steps on the Sabbath, as these are characteristic of weekday travel.) they feast on it to bless three times Their righteousness shines like seven suns (Note: cf. Isaiah 30:26) "LORD god of Israel, give a sign!" (Note: 1 Samuel 14:41. Some prayerbooks contain a later version, "LORD god of Israel, love of the pure," which does not fit the scheme of the hymn.) (LORD god of Israel, eternal savior.) (Note: This line appears only in printings and does not fit the scheme of the other stanzas. Rabbi Jacob Emden, unaware that the acrostic is complete in manuscript, suggests that it is the fourth line of the final stanza and its addition to the penultimate stanza represents a shortening of the hymn.)	Nor sowing nor reaping their Sabbath profanes; They rest and they feast thrice with grateful refrains: Their goodness a sevenfold radiance remains, Their stronghold the Lord Who eternally reigns.
קַדְּשֵׁם בְּמִצְוֹתֶיךָ וְטַהֲרֵם כְּעֶצֶם הַשָּׁמַיִם לָטֹהַר, רוּחֲךָ תְּנִיחֶנּוּ כַּבְּהֵמָה בַּבִּקְעָה תֵרֵד מִן הָהָר, שִׁבְטֵיהֶם תְּשַׁכְנֵם בְּנַחֲלַת הַסַּהַר כִּנְחָלִים נִטָּיוּ כְּגַנֹּת עֲלֵי נָהָר	qaddǝšēm bǝmiṣwōtêkā wǝṭahărēm kǝʿeṣem haššāmayim lāṭōhar, rûḥăkā tǝnîḥennû kabbǝhēmâ babbiqʿâ tērēd min hāhār, šibṭêhem tǝšaknēm bǝnaḥălat hassahar kinḥālîm niṭṭāyû kǝgannōt ʿălê nāhār	Sanctify them, and make them as pure as the very sky. (Note: Exodus 24:10) Let your spirit give them rest, like a beast coming off a mountain into a valley. (Note: cf. Isaiah 63:14) Settle their tribes (Note: Thus Add MS 27200. Early printings erroneously read "their Sabbaths".) in the territory of the moon, (Note: Song of Songs 7:3, "Your navel is like the basin of the moon." Numbers Rabbah 1:4 interprets, "This refers to the Sanhedrin . . . as the navel is at the center of the body, so the Sanhedrin is at the center of the Temple.") "Like groves they will spread out, like gardens by the river." (Note: Numbers 24:6)	Thy word make us pure as the sky, Thy pure veil! O let Thy grace guide us as herds in the dale, Reposing at ease, while the moonbeams grow pale, On meads by still streams whose cool waters ne'er fail

== Content of the hymn ==
The hymn praises those who keep the Sabbath, and stresses the reward waiting anyone who keeps the Sabbath. The hymn stresses the Sabbath experiences, the hope of the redemption of Jerusalem and the imminent rebuilding of the Temple.

Most prayerbooks omit the final stanza which completes the acrostic and instead insert the line "O LORD, god of Israel, eternal savior."

Abraham Abba of Pittsburgh, who did not realize that the acrostic was complete in manuscript, wrote an alternative final stanza:

קְדוֹשִׁים יִשְׂרָאֵל מֵאָז וּלְעוֹלָמִים, רָצִים לְמִגְדָּלְךָ וּבְשִׁמְךָ נִשְׂגָּבִים, שַׁבָּתוֹת קָדְשֶךָ מְיַיחַדִים וּמְעַנְּגִים וּבְךָ נִדְבָּקִים, תִּיקוּן הַשָּׁלֵם יַשִׂיגוּ בְחַיֵינוּ בְּחֶסֶד וּבְרַחַַמִים וּבְקָרֵב הַיָּמִים	qǝdôšîm yiśrāʾēl mēʾāz ûlǝʿôlāmîm, rāṣîm lǝmigdālǝkā ûbǝšimkā niśgābîm, šabbātôt qādǝšekā mǝyayḥadîm ûmǝʿannǝgîm ûbǝkā nidbāqîm, tîqûn haššālēm yaśîgû bǝḥayênû bǝḥesed ûbǝraḥaamîm ûbǝqārēb hayyāmîm	Holy are Israel, from yore and for all time. they rush to your tower and exalt your name. (Note: cf. Proverbs 18:10) Your holy Sabbaths are unique and enjoyable; they are attached to them. The full repair will occur in our days, in kindness and in mercy and quickly.
