= Judah ben Kalonymus ben Meir =

Judah ben Kalonymus ben Meir (Yehudah ben Qalonymos b. Meïr, d.1196/99) was a dayyan and Talmudic and midrashic lexicographer from Speyer descended from the Kalonymus family, and a pupil of Ephraim of Regensburg. His work Seder Tanna'im ve-Amora'im (or Yihusei) is a list of the tannaim and amoraim, which exists in manuscript in the Bodleian library (No. 2199 and 2220 in Neubauer, Cat. Bodl. Hebr. MSS.) and published by Steinschneider. He is also the author of tosafot and the lost Sefer ha-Agron (The Lexicon Book), a dictionary of the animals, vegetables, and minerals in the Talmud.

His father was the Jewish community leader and responsible for collecting taxes on behalf of the king. His mother's uncle was Samuel of Speyer and her cousin was Judah ben Samuel of Regensburg. His brother, likely R. David ben Kalonymus, wrote a commentary on the Berakhot that was recovered in fragmentary form in a monastery library in Melk and in Graz university library, used for book binding, part of the so-called European Geniza.

He credits Moses of Kiev with transmitting a teaching of Rabbenu Tam.
