= Moses Cordovero =

Italian physician

Moses Cordovero was a physician who lived at Leghorn (Livorno), Tuscany in the seventeenth century. David Conforte praises him as a good physician, and also on account of his scholarship and philanthropy. He was always eager to secure the release of prisoners through his personal influence as well as by ransom. Cordovero died at an advanced age.
