= Menucha veSimcha =

Menucha veSimcha is a piyyut which Ashkenazic Jews traditionally sing on Sabbath eve. The piyyut is acrostically signed "MoSHE", and some attribute it to Moses ben Kalonymus.

The theme of the piyyut is praise of the Sabbath. The payyetan praises those who properly observe the Sabbath, whose acts attest to God's six-day creation of the world. The piyyut mentions various Sabbath obligations and practices, and the reward which comes to those who keep them.

== Words ==
Hebrew Original	English translation
מְנוּחָה וְשִׂמְחָה אוֹר לַיְּהוּדִים יוֹם שַׁבָּתוֹן יוֹם מַחֲמַדִּים שׁוֹמְרָיו וְזוֹכְרָיו הֵמָּה מְעִידִים כִּי לְשִׁשָּׁה כֹּל בְּרוּאִים וְעוֹמְדִים.	Rest and happiness, light to Jews! Day of rest, day of delights. Its keepers and observers -- they attest That all was created in six.
שְׁמֵי שָׁמַיִם אֶרֶץ וְיַמִּים כָּל צְבָא מָרוֹם גְּבוֹהִים וְרָמִים תַּנִּין וְאָדָם וְחַיַּת רְאֵמִים כִּי בְּיָהּ יְיָ צוּר עוֹלָמִים.	High heavens, earth, and seas, All the great and exalted host of heaven, Leviathan, man, wild oxen, That God is the Eternal Rock.
הוּא אֲשֶׁר דִּבֶּר לְעַם סְגֻלָּתוֹ שָׁמוֹר לְקַדְּשׁוֹ מִבֹּאוֹ וְעַד צֵאתוֹ שַׁבָּת קֹדֶשׁ יוֹם חֶמְדָּתוֹ כִּי בוֹ שָׁבַת אֵל מִכָּל מְלַאכְתּוֹ.	He who said to his special people, "Be sure to sanctify it from start to finish", The holy Sabbath, His favorite day, For then did God rest form all his work.
בְּמִצְוַת שַׁבָּת אֵל יַחֲלִיצָךְ קוּם קְרָא אֵלָיו יָחִישׁ לְאַמְּצָךְ נִשְׁמַת כָּל חַי וְגַם נַעֲרִיצָךְ אֱכוֹל בְּשִׂמְחָה כִּי כְּבָר רָצָךְ.	In the Sabbath commandment, God encourages you. Come, call to him, he hurries to strengthen you! Breath of all life, he will also hearten you, Eat in happiness -- it is foreordained.
בְּמִשְׁנֶה לֶחֶם וְקִדּוּשׁ רַבָּה בְּרוֹב מַטְעַמִּים וְרוּחַ נְדִיבָה יִזְכּוּ לְרַב טוּב הַמִּתְעַנְּגִים בָּהּ בְּבִיאַת גּוֹאֵל לְחַיֵּי הָעוֹלָם הַבָּא.	With doubled bread, and great kiddush, With many dishes, and vigorous spirit, Those who enjoy it will merit much good, When the Messiah brings us to the Next World.
