= List of Jewish Kabbalists =

This article lists figures in Kabbalah according to historical chronology and schools of thought. In popular reference, Kabbalah has been used to refer to the whole history of Jewish mysticism, but more accurately, and as used in academic Jewish studies, Kabbalah refers to the doctrines, practices and esoteric exegetical method in Torah, that emerged in 12th-13th century Southern France and Spain, and was developed further in 16th century Ottoman Palestine. These formed the basis of subsequent Jewish mystical development.

This is a partial list of Jewish Kabbalists; secondary literature incorporating Kabbalah is enormous, particularly in the voluminous library of Hasidic Judaism that turned esoteric Kabbalah into a popular revivalist movement. Hasidism both adapted Kabbalah to its own internalised psychological concern, and also continued the development of the Jewish mystical tradition. Therefore, only formative articulators of Hasidic thought, or particularly Kabbalistic schools/authors in Hasidism are included here. In the Sabbatean mystical heresy that broke away from Judaism, only the founders are listed. Solely academic-university Jewish studies researchers of Jewish mysticism, not being "Kabbalists", nor necessarily Jewish, are not listed here; nor are separate non-Jewish derivative/syncretic traditions of Kabbalah.

Rabbinic figures in Judaism are often known after the name of their magnum opus, or as Hebrew acronyms based on their name, preceded by R for Rabbi/Rav.

== Early Jewish mysticism ==
Talmudic tannaic sages: Maaseh Merkabah (mystical Chariot)-Maaseh Bereishit (mystical Creation) (1st-2nd centuries). Yordei Merkabah (Chariot Riders)-Heikhalot (Palaces) mysticism (1st-11th centuries). Early-Formative texts are variously Traditional/Attributed/Anonymous/Pseudepigraphical:

- Nehunya ben HaKanah Traditional attribution of the Bahir. 1st century
- Four Who Entered the Pardes (including Rabbi Akiva c. 40–137 CE)
- Shimon bar Yochai (RaSHBI) Alleged Protagonist of the Zohar 1st-2nd centuries

Hasidei Ashkenaz (1150-1250 German Pietists). Mystical conceptions influenced Medieval Kabbalah:

- Samuel of Speyer (Shmuel HaHasid) 12th century
- Judah ben Samuel of Regensburg (Yehudah HaHasid) 1140–1217
- Eleazar of Worms (Eleazar Rokeach) c. 1176–1238

== Medieval emergence and development of Kabbalah (12th-15th centuries) ==
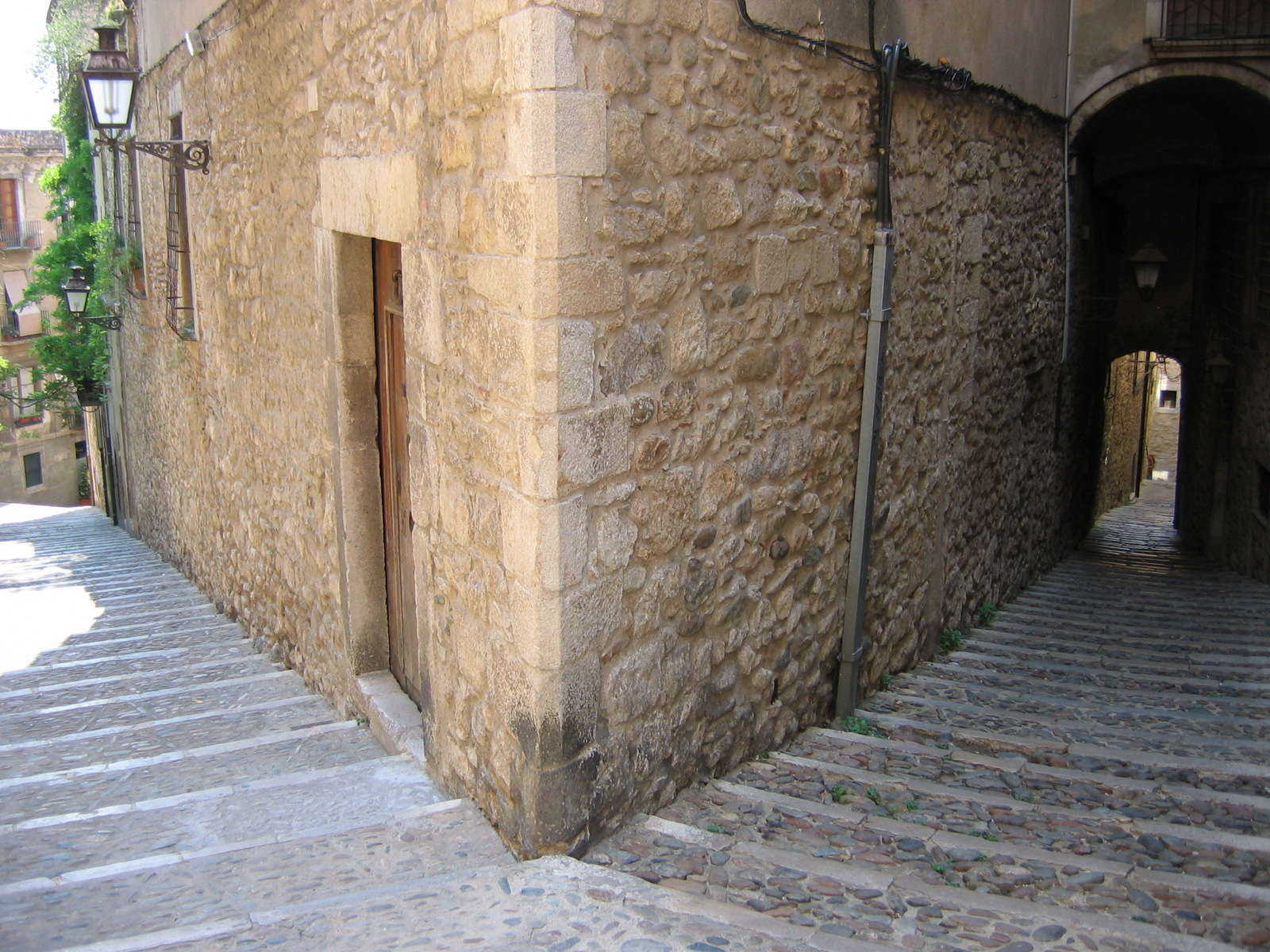
Jewish Quarter "El Call" in Girona, Catalonia North-East Spain, an early centre of Kabbalah

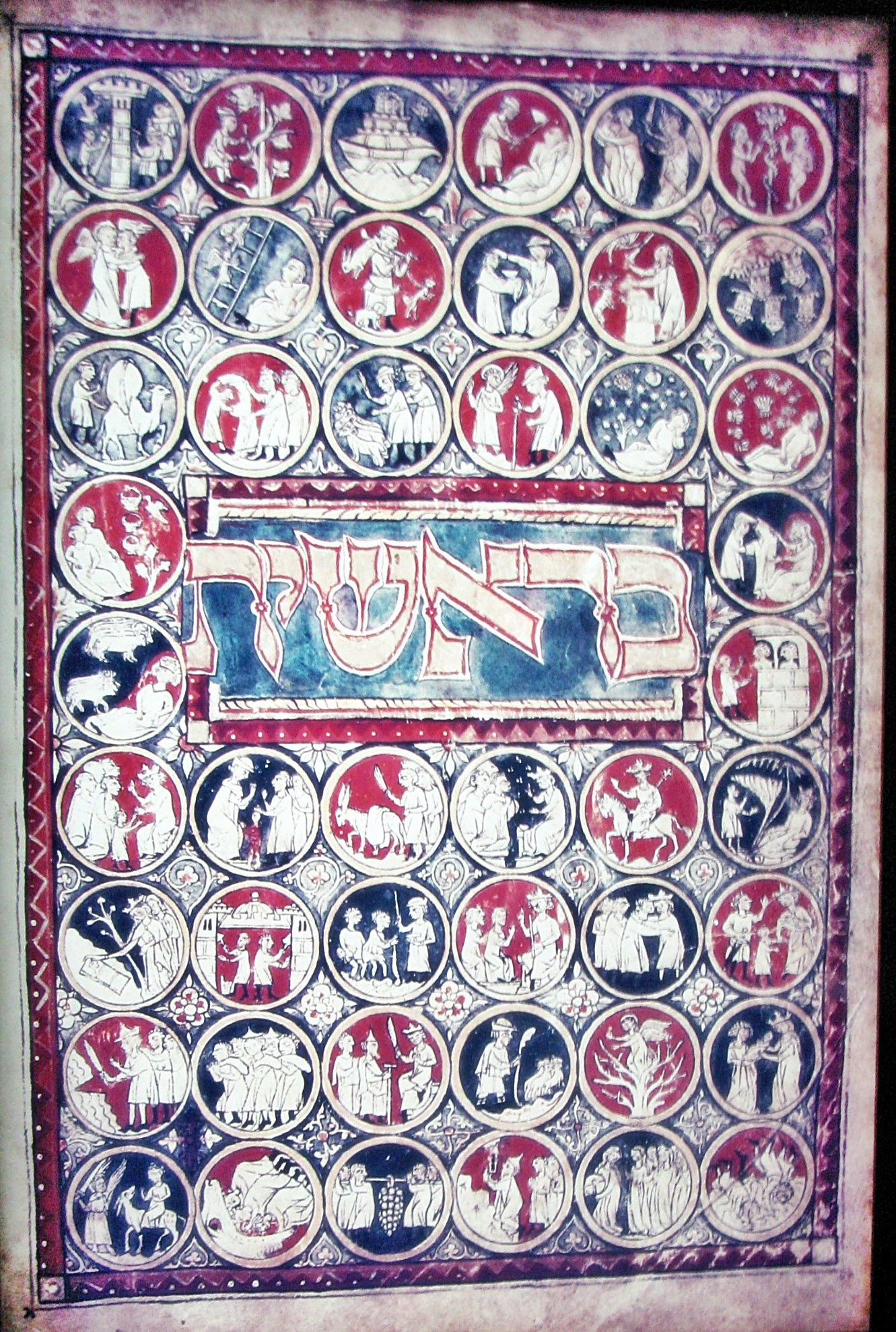
Genesis in the Schocken Bible, 1300. Kabbalists in Castile described Evil gnostically, personified in Lilith-Samael

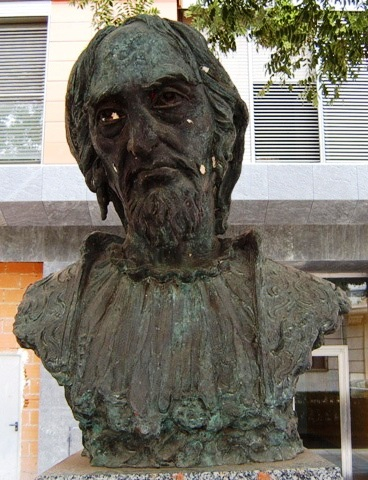
Moses de León, disseminator of the Zohar, main text of Jewish mysticism

1618 edition Torah. Kabbalistic commentaries include 13th century Nachmanides, 16th century Alshich and 18th century ibn Attar

Provence circle (Southern France - Provence and Languedoc 12th-13th centuries):

- Abraham ben Isaac of Narbonne (RAVaD II) c. 1110–1179
- Abraham ben David of Posquières (RABaD/RAVaD III) 1125–1198
- Isaac the Blind (Yitzhak Sagi Nehor) Neoplatonic approach c. 1160–1235

Catalonia/Girona circle (North-East Spain 13th century):

- Ezra ben Solomon
- Azriel of Gerona Synthesised Gnostic and Neoplatonic elements c. 1160–1238
- Nachmanides (Moses ben Nahman, RaMBaN) Introduced Kabbalah in classic Bible commentary 1194–1270
- Jacob ben Sheshet
- Meshullam ben Solomon Da Piera

Castile circle (Northern Spain 13th century). Developed Demonic/Gnostic theory:

- Jacob HaKohen
- Isaac HaKohen Author of Treatise on the Left Emanation
- Todros ben Joseph Abulafia c. 1225–1285
- Moses of Burgos

Ecstatic/Prophetic-Meditative Kabbalah (13th century):

- Abraham Abulafia Spain, Italy, Malta. 1240-after 1291

Publication of the Zohar (1280s–90s Northern Spain):

- Moses de León c. 1250–1305

13th century Kabbalistic commentary:

- Abraham ben Isaac of Granada Southern Spain 13th century
- Joseph Gikatilla Prolific writings, including Shaarei Orah. Spain 1248–after 1305
- Menahem Recanati Only Italian of his time writing mainly Kabbalah 1250–1310

14th-15th centuries saw a slowing continuation in Kabbalistic commentary:

- Isaac of Acco Pupil of Nahmanides. Israel and Spain 13th-14th century
- Bahya ben Asher (Rabbeinu Behaye) Kabbalistic classic commentary on the Torah. Spain d. 1340

== Fusional influences (15th-17th centuries) ==
Influence of Medieval Jewish rationalism in Spain declined, culminating with the expulsion. Jewish fusions of Philosophy and Kabbalah were shared by wider non-Jewish Renaissance trends (not listed here):

- Abraham Cohen de Herrera Fusion of Philosophy and Kabbalah. Spain and elsewhere c. 1570–1635

== 16th century Kabbalistic renaissance ==
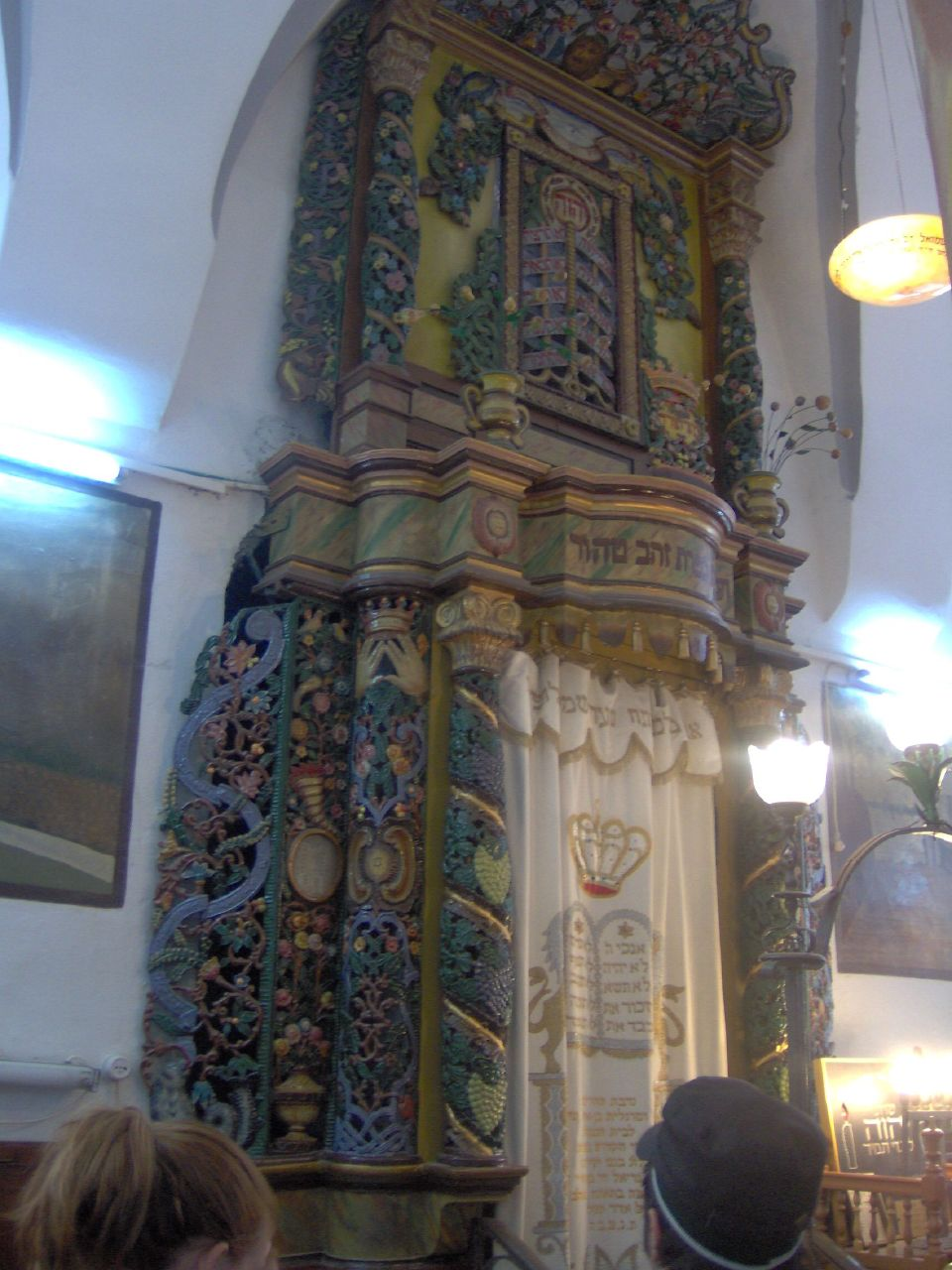
Safed, Galilee, became the centre for the early-modern renaissance and comprehensive systemisations of Kabbalah

Emigrees, some from Spain, some founding new centre of Safed in Ottoman Palestine:

- Meir ibn Gabbai Spain to the East. Early organizer. Kabbalistic response to Philosophy-Rationalism b.1480
- Joseph Karo (Beit Yoseph) Central legalist and mystical diary. Spain to Safed 1488–1575
- Shlomo Alkabetz Greece to Safed c. 1500–1580
- Moshe Alshich (Alshich Hakadosh) Turkey to Safed. Kabbalistic classic Bible commentary 1508–1593

Cordoverian school. Rationally-influenced systemisation of preceding Kabbalah:

- Moses ben Jacob Cordovero (RaMaK) Taught in Safed. Author of Pardes Rimonim 1522–1570

Lurianic school. New mythological systemisation of Kabbalah. Basis of modern Kabbalah. Kitvei HaAri-Writings of the Ari written by disciples:

- Isaac Luria (HaARI-zal) Taught in Safed. 1534–1572
- Hayim Vital Italy, Safed, Syria. Foremost disciple of Luria. Author of Etz Hayim 1543–1620
- Israel Sarug Spread Lurianism in Europe 1500s–1610

Safed dissemination:

- Eliyahu de Vidas Ottoman Palestine. Author of Reshit Chochmah Kabbalistic-Ethical work 1518–1592

== 16th-19th century Kabbalistic commentary ==
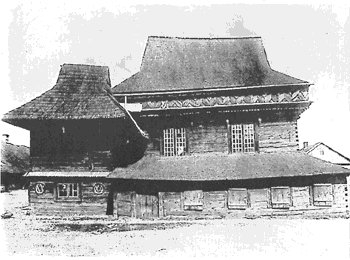
1600s synagogue in Zabłudów, Poland. Baal Shem-Nistarim activists worked among the common folk, from which Hasidism developed

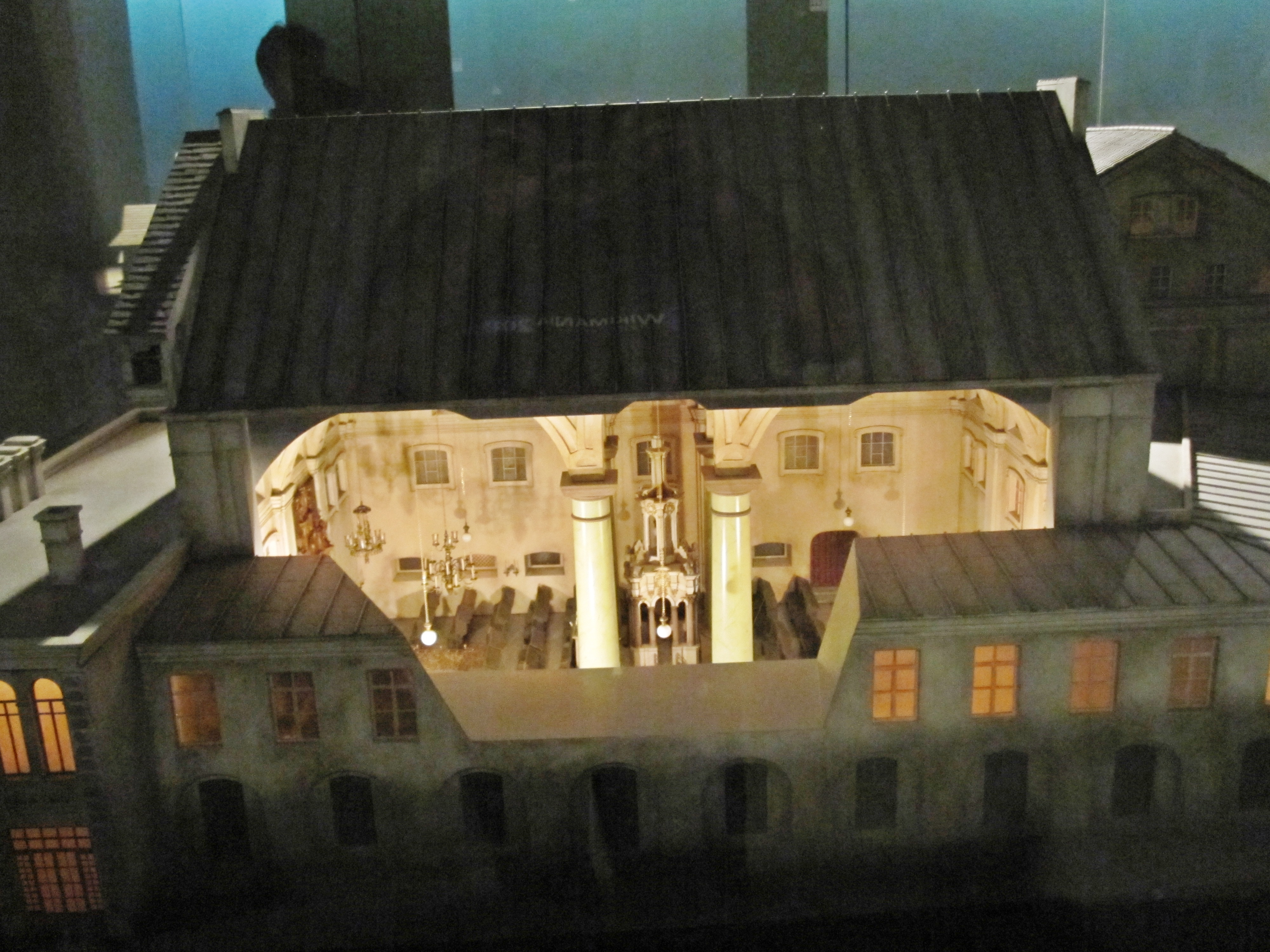
Great Synagogue of Vilna model. Rabbinic Mitnagdic Judaism reserved esoteric Kabbalah for traditional Talmudic elite

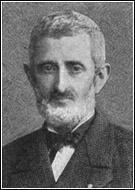
Elijah Benamozegh (1822–1900), in Italy, continued a Universalist tradition of reading Kabbalah

Central European Kabbalist Rabbis:

- Judah Loew ben Bezalel (MaHaRal) Mystical Jewish thought in philosophical style. Prague c. 1520–1609
- Isaiah Horowitz (SheLaH haKadosh, author of Shnei Luchot HaBrit) Prague to Palestine c. 1565–1630
- Jonathan Eybeschutz Central Europe. Protagonist in Emden-Eybeschutz mysticism controversy 1690–1764
- Nathan Adler Germany 1741–1800

Italian Kabbalists:

- Moshe Haim Luzzatto (RaMHaL) Kabbalistic dissemination and cultural works. Italy, Holland, Israel 1707–1746
- Elijah Benamozegh Universalist interpretation of Kabbalah. Italian Rabbi and scholar 1822–1900

Sephardi-Mizrachi (Oriental) Kabbalah:

- Abraham Azulai Author of Chesed le-Abraham. Morocco to Israel c. 1570–1643
- Haim ibn Attar (Ohr ha-Haim classic Torah commentary) Morocco to Israel 1696–1743
- Shalom Sharabi (RaShaSh) Yemen to Israel. Esoteric clarifier of Luria and Bet El Synagogue head 1720–1777
- Haim Joseph David Azulai (HIDA) Bibliophile and Israel Rabbinic emissary 1724–1806
- Ben Ish Hai (Yosef Hayyim) Sephardi Hakham in Iraq 1832–1909

Sabbatean mystical heresy (founders only):

- Sabbatai Zevi Messianic claimant. Founder of Sabbatean break with Judaism. Ottoman Empire 1626–1676
- Nathan of Gaza Prophet of Sabbatai Zevi. Israel and Ottoman Empire 1643–1680

Eastern European Baal Shem/Nistarim and other mystical circles:

- Elijah Baal Shem of Chelm First to be given Baal Shem title. Poland 1550–1583
- Eliyahu Baal Shem Ben Yosef Yutzpa, also Baal Shem of Worms, founder of Nistarim mystical activists. Poland/Germany 1536/7–1654
- Elijah Loans, also Baal Shem of Worms. 1555–1636
- Joel Baal Shem of Ropshitz
- Adam Baal Shem. A teacher of the Besht
- Abraham Gershon of Kitov Brody Rabbinic Lurianic circle before becoming Besht's brother-in-law. Ukraine, Israel c. 1701-1761
- Baal Shem of London (Hayyim Samuel Jacob Falk) Ukraine/Germany and England 1708–1782
- Baal Shem of Michelstadt (Seckel Lob Wormser) Germany 1768–1847
- Hannah Rachel Verbermacher

Mitnagdic/Lithuanian Kabbalah:

- Vilna Gaon (Elijah ben Solomon Zalman, GRA) Head of Non-Hasidic Eastern European Judaism. Opposed Hasidism 1720–1797
- Hayim Volozhin Founder of Lithuanian Yeshivah movement. Main theorist of Mitnagdism in his Nefesh HaHayim 1749–1821
- Yitzchak Eizik Chaver
- Shlomo Elyashiv (Baal HaLeshem, after his major work) Lithuania 1841–1926
- Mordechai Leib HaCohen Kaminetzky

== Hasidic popularisation of Kabbalah (18th century-present) ==
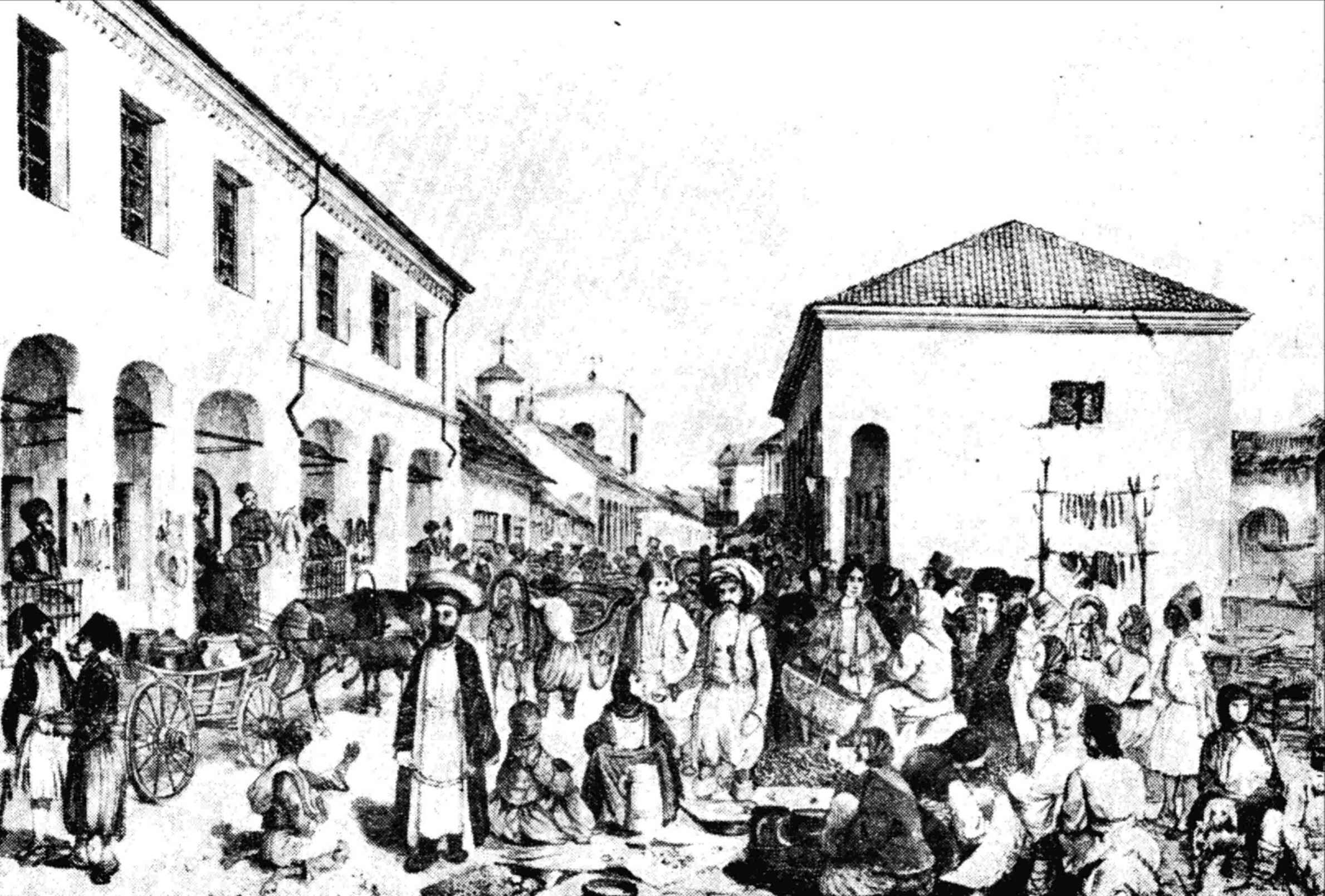
Hasidim in 1845 Iași Romania. Hasidism changed Kabbalah's theosophical aim to the psychology of Divine Omnipresence amidst materiality

Kabbalistic notions pervade Hasidic thought, but it developed a new approach to Kabbalah, replacing esoteric theosophical focus with successive psychological internalisation. Therefore, only a minimal listing of Hasidic figures is given here; founding formative figures or commentators on esoteric Kabbalah texts/tradition.
Founding East-European Hasidic Masters:

- Baal Shem Tov, (BeSHT, Israel ben Eliezer). Founder of Hasidism. Ukraine 1698–1760
- Jacob Joseph of Polnoye. First writer of Hasidic thought. Ukraine 1710–1784
- Dov Ber of Mezeritch (Maggid of Mezeritch). Organizer of Hasidic thought, architect school of movement. Ukraine c. 1700/1710–1772
- Elimelech of Lizhensk. Founder of General-Hasidic "practical/popular Tzadikism" leadership. Poland 1717–1787
- Levi Yitzchok of Berditchev. Author of Kedushas Levi classic Hasidic Torah commentary. Ukraine 1740–1809
- Schneur Zalman of Liadi. Intellectual-Hasidism Habad school. Author of Tanya systematic presentation of Hasidic doctrine. Russia 1745–1812
- Nachman of Bratzlav. Kabbalistic-Imaginative Breslov school. Kabbalistic storytelling. Ukraine 1772–1810

Other Hasidic commentators on Kabbalah:

- Hayyim Tyrer. Author of Sidduro shel Shabbat, kabbalistic homilies on Sabbatical subjects, and Sha'ar ha-Tefillah, kabbalistic reflections on prayer. Died at Jerusalem 1813.
- Yisroel Hopsztajn (Maggid of Kozhnitz) A father of Polish Hasidism. Commentaries on Zohar and Tikunei Zohar 1737–1814
- Dovber Schneuri Second Habad leader. Wrote commentary on Zohar and contemplation guides. Russia 1773–1827
- Zadok HaKohen of Lublin. Kabbalistic commentaries based on Izbica personal illumination. Poland 1823–1900
- Yaakov Yehuda Aryeh Leib Frenkel (Gevuras Aryeh). Kabbalistic work on Ramban's Torah commentary. Hungary 1850/1855–1940
- Levi Yitzchak Schneerson.(1878–1944), father of the seventh and last Chabad-Lubavitch Rebbe, Rabbi Menachem Mendel Schneerson.
- Menachem Mendel Schneerson. Lubavitcher Rebbe. Unity of esoteric Kabbalah with exoteric Judaism through Hasidic Thought 1902–1994

== 20th century Kabbalah ==
Sephardi synagogue in the birthplace of Luria. In Jerusalem Oriental and European traditions of esoteric Kabbalah meet

- Eliyahu Leon Levi (1939-2015)

From diverse traditions in Kabbalah (excluding Hasidic thought's internalisation approach):

- Abraham Isaac Kook Chief Rabbi of Mandate Palestine and poetic-visionary mystical thinker 1865–1935
- Yehuda Ashlag (Baal HaSulam, after main work) Translation of Zohar with new approach in Luria. Poland and Israel 1885—1954
- Baba Sali (Israel Abuhatzeira) Mizrachi sage. Morocco to Israel 1890–1984
- Yitzhak Kaduri Mizrachi continuation from Rashash. Iraq to Israel d. 2006
- Steve Turner (born 1946), professional tennis player and tennis coach

== Modern teachers of Jewish mysticism ==
Individual teachers of Jewish mysticism spirituality in modern-style articulations. Solely academic teachers in Jewish studies research are not listed here.
Orthodox Kabbalistic/Hasidic:

- Aryeh Kaplan
- Avraham Brandwein
- Menachem Froman
- Adin Steinsaltz
- Gamliel Rabinowitz
- Yoshiyahu Yosef Pinto
- Yitzchak Meir Morgenstern
- Avraham Mordechai Gottlieb
- Adin Steinsaltz
- Yitzchak Ginsburgh
- Moshe Weinberger

Non-Orthodox/Neo-Hasidic/Jewish Renewal:

- Arthur Green
- Lawrence Kushner
- Shefa Gold

Universalist-style Jewish teachers:

- Philip Berg
- Z'ev ben Shimon Halevi
- Michael Laitman

== See also ==
- History of Jewish mysticism
- Kabbalah: Primary texts
