= Shem (surname) =

Shem is the surname of the following notable people:

- Shem Tov, multiple people
- Adam Baal Shem, legendary rabbi and mystic
- Goh V Shem (born 1989), Malaysian badminton player
- Samuel Shem (born 1944), pen-name of American psychiatrist Stephen Joseph Bergman
- Yoel Baal Shem, 17th century Orthodox Jewish scholar
- Zechariah Shem (born 1994), Vanuatuan cricketer

== See also ==
- Schem
