= Shem (disambiguation) =

Shem is a biblical character, one of the sons of Noah.

Shem may also refer to:

- Shem (given name)
- Shem (surname)
- Shem (Conan), a nation in the fictional world of Conan the Barbarian
- Shem HaMephorash, a name of God in the Kabbalah
- "Hawks over Shem", a 1955 Conan the Barbarian novelette by L. Sprague de Camp
- Baal Shem, a historical Jewish occupation, a healer and exorcist using Kabbalistic methods
- House of Shem, New Zealand reggae band that debuted in 2008
- Ohel Shem, Israeli high school in Ramat Gan
- Paraphrase of Shem, apocryphal Gnostic writing
- A nickname for Przemek Karnowski (born 1993), Polish basketball player
- A slip of paper placed in a Golem to animate it

== See also ==
- Schem
