= Eliyahu Baal Shem =

Rabbi Eliyahu Baal Shem or Elijah Baal Shem may refer to:

- Rabbi Elijah Ba'al Shem of Chelm (born 1520)
- Rabbi Elijah Loans (born at Frankfurt-am-Main, 1555; died at Worms, 1636)
- Rabbi Eliyahu Ben Yosef Yutzpa Baal Shem (1536–1654)
