= Practical Kabbalah =

Branch of the Jewish mystical tradition that concerns the use of magic

Practical Kabbalah (Hebrew: קַבָּלָה מַעֲשִׂית Kabbalah Ma'asit), in historical Judaism, is a branch of Jewish mysticism that concerns the use of magic. It was considered permitted white magic whose usage was reserved for the adept — those who could identify its spiritual source and usage circumstance as holy (Q-D-Š) and pure (tumah and taharah/טומאה וטהרה), and not evil or impure (qlippoth). The prevalent concern of overstepping Judaism's prohibitions against impure magic ensured Practical Kabbalah remained a minor tradition in Jewish history. Its teachings include the use of divine and angelic names for amulets and incantations.

Practical Kabbalah is mentioned in historical texts, but most Kabbalists have taught that its use is forbidden. It is contrasted with the mainstream tradition in Kabbalah of Kabbalah Iyunit (contemplative Kabbalah), which seeks to explain the nature of God and the nature of existence through theological study and Jewish meditative techniques.

According to Gershom Scholem, many of the teachings of practical Kabbalah predate and are independent of the theoretical Kabbalah, which is usually associated with the term:

Historically speaking, a large part of the contents of practical Kabbalah predate those of the speculative Kabbalah and are not dependent on them. In effect, what came to be considered practical Kabbalah constituted an agglomeration of all the magical practices that developed in Judaism from the Talmudic period down through the Middle Ages. The doctrine of the Sefirot hardly ever played a decisive role in these practices..."

== History ==
=== Early practices ===
Halakha (Jewish religious law) forbids divination and other forms of soothsaying, and the Talmud lists many persistent yet condemned divining practices. The very frequency with which divination is mentioned is taken as an indication that it was widely practiced in the folk religion of ancient Israel, and a limited number of forms of divination were generally accepted within all of Israelite society, the most common being oneiromancy (interpretation of dreams for prophetic meanings). Other magical practices of Judaic folk religion which became part of practical Kabbalah date from Talmudic times and include the making of amulets and other folk remedies using the esoteric names of angels.

=== Merkabah mysticism ===
In Talmudic and Gaonic times, rabbinic mysticism focused around exegesis of Ezekiel's vision of the divine Chariot-Throne, and meditative introspective ascent into the heavenly chambers. This elite practical mysticism, as described in the esoteric Hekhalot literature, incorporated and merged into magical incantation elements. The Talmud and Midrash refer to this as "using the Divine Name" for theurgic-practical ascent, as in the story of the Ten Martyrs who enquired in Heaven of the decree. In the Hekhalot literature, angels guarding each level are meditatively bound by formulae and seals to allow entry.

=== Medieval Hasidei Ashkenaz and the Sefer Yetzirah ===
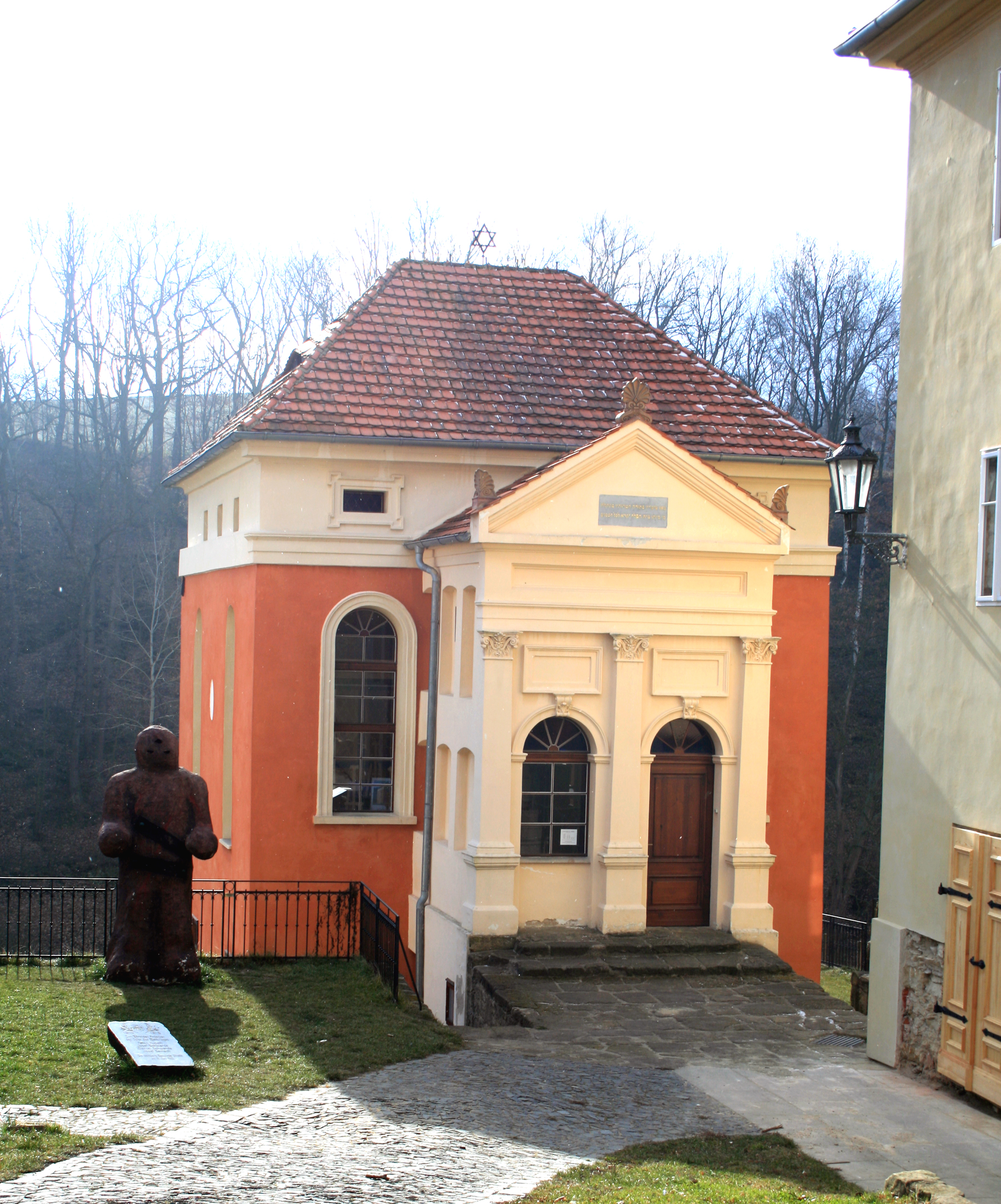
Úštěk Synagogue with statue of the Golem of Prague, Czech Republic

In the 13th century, one problem which intrigued the Ashkenazi Hasidim (literally "the Pious of Germany") was the possibility of the creation of life through magical means. They used the word "golem" (literally, shapeless or lifeless matter) to refer to an hypothetical homunculus given life by means of the magical invocation of Divine names. This interest inspired an entire cycle of legend revolving around the golem which continued into the 18th century. The identification of the ancient Sefer Yetzirah concerning the creative force of the Hebrew letters as the means to create a golem was derived from interpretation of two statements in the Babylonian Talmud, Tractate Sanhedrin. One relates that amora Abba ben Joseph bar Ḥama ("Rava") created a person; in the second, two other Sages were studying "the laws of "creation" and created a "third-born calf" that they ate for a celebration.

=== Medieval separation of Conceptual and Practical Kabbalah ===
The separation of the mystical and magical elements of Kabbalah, dividing it into speculative theological Kabbalah (Kabbalah Iyyunit) with its meditative traditions, and theurgic practical Kabbalah (Kabbalah Ma'asit), had occurred by the beginning of the 14th century. Many traditional speculative Kabbalists disapproved of practical Kabbalah, including Abraham Abulafia, who strongly condemned it. While the great majority of historical Kabbalistic involvement, writing and development concerns the theological Kabbalah, the majority of practical Kabbalaistic writings were never published.

One important tradition of practical Kabbalah thrived in Spain during the second half of the 15th century, before the Alhambra Decree. The main text of the tradition was called Sepher ha-Mashiv. The practitioners of this tradition were described by Moshe Idel as "interested in demonology and the use of coercive incantations to summon demons, angels, and even God" in order to hasten the Messianic Age. Joseph Della Reina's (1418–1472) failure with his students in this, was considered a warning by later Kabbalists of the potential perils of involvement with Kabbalistic practice.

=== Ban of Safed Kabbalistic Renaissance ===
In the 16th century Isaac Luria, who opposed Kabbalah Ma'asit and forbade his students from writing amulets and using other techniques of practical Kabbalah, evolved a form of exorcism which effectively transferred techniques from practical to speculative Kabbalah. While this led to the displacement of magical formulas and rites by contemplative exercises, the old forms of practical Kabbalah continued to exert broad appeal. Luria's position as the central teacher of modern Kabbalah, the foundation for later Hasidism, gives his proscription authoritative force. He taught that in our generations, without the Temple in Jerusalem and its ashes of the Red Heifer to purify, the pursuit of the realm of practical Kabbalah by a person with an impure body is very detrimental.

=== Early modern Baalei Shem and other developments ===
The traditional role of the Baal Shem healer involved accepted methods between borderline practical Kabbalah and meditative Kabbalah, such as amulets and psychic abilities. Among recorded figures from early-modern times were Elijah Ba'al Shem of Chelm (1550–1583) and the Baal Shem of London (1708–1782). Yisrael Baal Shem Tov began his activity as a traditional Baal Shem, before founding Hasidism. While the association of the Maharal of Prague (1520–1609) with the creation of a golem only emerged in later times, contemporary tradition records Elijah Baal Shem as creating a golem. The Sabbatean mystical heresies of Sabbatai Zevi (1626–1676) and Jacob Frank (1726–1791) led to the 1750s accusation of Jonathan Eybeschütz by Jacob Emden of being a secret Sabbatean. It was chiefly based on the interpretation of some amulets prepared by Eybeschütz, in which Emden saw Sabbatean allusions. The leader of Mitnagdic Lithuanian Judaism, the Kabbalist Vilna Gaon (1720–1797), related that in his youth he had attempted to make a golem, but stopped when he perceived a spirit of impurity involved.

Rabbi Aharon Yehuda of Chelm, a practitioner of practical Kabbalah, and baal shem, was said to have created a golem through use of the divine name.

Rabbi Yhitzak Ayhiz Halpern, a practitioner of practical Kabbalah, and baal shem, was said to have saved a ship from capsizing, and to have exorcised a dybbuk.

Rabbi Naftali Katz of Posnan was said to have brought a dead man back to life to free his wife from agunah.

Rabbi Hirsch Fraenkel was sentenced to imprisonment in Germany in 1713, on the basis of having a library of books said to contain examples of sorcery, such as how to use oaths, and amulets to overcome demons, see the future, and speak to the dead.

=== Divine intercession through Deveikut by the Hasidic Tzadik ===
In Hasidism, the displacement of practical Kabbalah using directly magical means, by conceptual and meditative trends gained much further emphasis, while simultaneously instituting meditative theurgy for material blessings at the heart of its social mysticism. Hasidism internalised Kabbalah through the psychology of deveikut (cleaving to God), and cleaving to the Tzadik (Hasidic Rebbe). In Hasidic doctrine, the tzaddik channels Divine spiritual and physical bounty to his followers by altering the Will of God (uncovering a deeper concealed Will) through his own deveikut and self-nullification. Dov Ber of Mezeritch is concerned to distinguish this theory of the Tzadik's will altering and deciding the Divine Will, from directly magical process. This rendered the external methods of practical Kabbalah, its willed power over angels and lower spiritual forces, as unnecessary and a hindrance, though some Hasidic leaders retained use of traditional amulets at the borderline of practical Kabbalah.

This change was manifested in the personal life of Hasidism's founder, the Baal Shem Tov (1698–1760), in his move from Baal Shem to the prototype of Hasidic leader. While a Baal Shem, he used amulets. At the end of his life, the Ba'al Shem Tov never wrote the Names of God, only his own name in amulets, Yisrael ben Sara or Yisrael ben Eliezer. A traditional story relates that on one early occasion the Baal Shem Tov resorted to practical Kabbalistic names of God, to cross a river and save his life. Afterward he regretted this, even though he had used it in holiness. He knew that his repentance was accepted when later, he found himself again in a similar situation. This time he did not use practical Kabbalah to perform the miracle, but instead used faith to give him the miraculous supernatural power to cross the river. He then knew that his teshuvah was complete. Hasidic thought teaches that its internalised mysticism enables the divine soul to affect the world through its essential connection to God, rather than Divine manifestations of Kabbalah.

== Methods ==
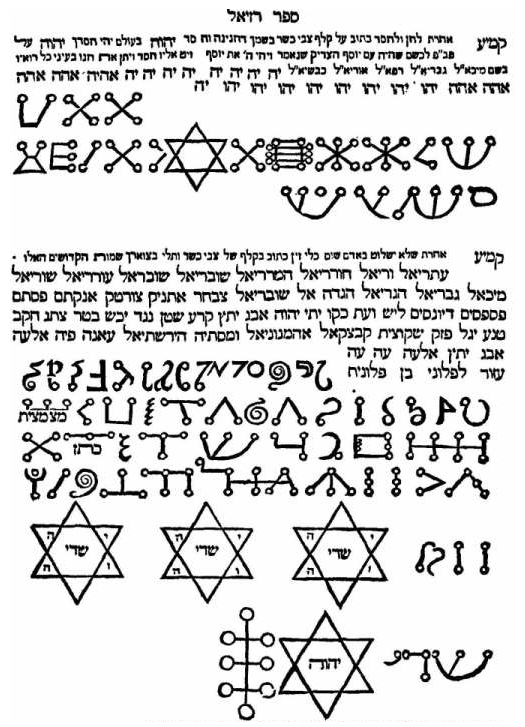
An excerpt from Sefer Raziel HaMalakh, featuring various magical sigils (סגולות segulot in Hebrew)

Despite the prohibition against divination of the future, there is no prohibition against understanding the past nor coming to a greater understanding of present and future situations through inspiration gained by the Kabbalah (a subtle distinction and one often hard to delineate). The appeal to occult power outside the monotheist deity for divination purpose is unacceptable in Judaism, but at the same time it is held that the righteous have access to occult knowledge. Such knowledge can come through dreams and incubation (inducing clairvoyant dreams), Metoposcopy (reading faces, lines on the face, or auras emanating from the face), ibburim and maggidim (spirit possession), and/or various methods of scrying.

The Midrash and Talmud are replete with the use of names of God and incantations that are claimed to effect supernatural or theurgic results. Most post-Talmudic rabbinical literature seeks to curb the use of any or most of these formulae, termed Kabbalah Ma'asit ("practical Kabbalah"). There are various arguments for this; one stated by the Medieval Rabbi Yaakov ben Moshe Levi Moelin is that the person using it may lack the required grounding, and the ritual would be ineffective.

Yet the interest in these rituals of power continued largely unabated until recently. The Talmud mentions the use of charms for healing, and a wide range of magical cures were sanctioned by rabbis. It was ruled that any practice actually producing a cure was not to be considered superstitious and there has been the widespread practice of medicinal amulets, and folk remedies (segullot) in Jewish societies across time and geography.

== Image gallery ==
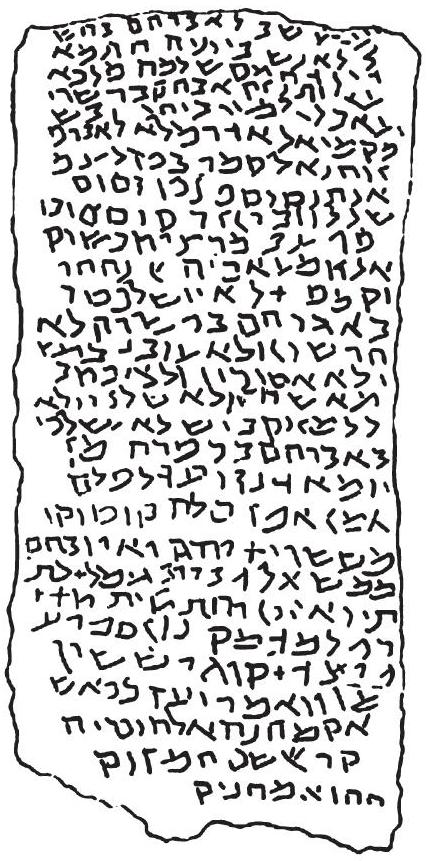
Judeo-Aramaic inscription from gold plaque amulet, Georgia 4th-6th centuries CE

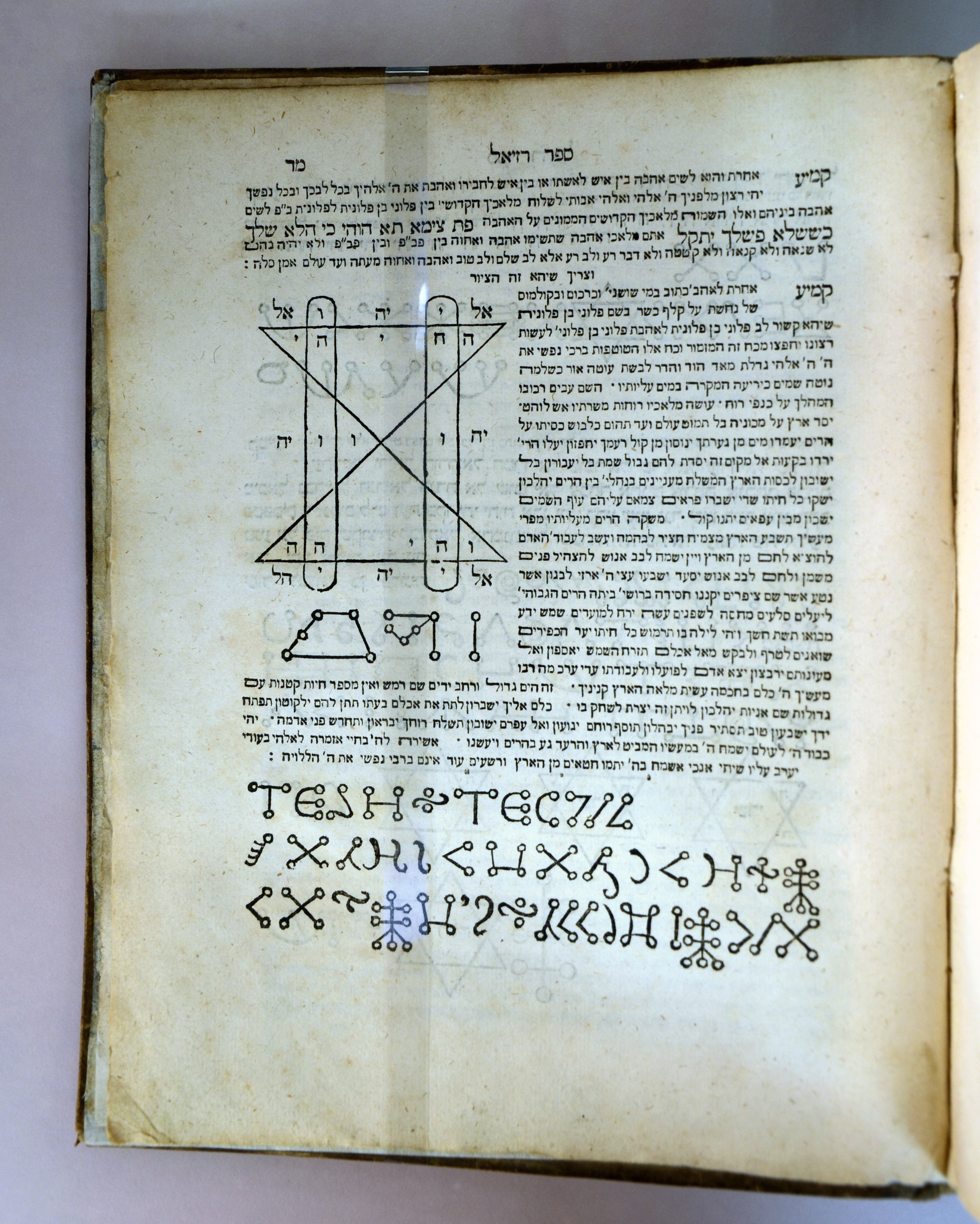
Sefer Raziel edition printed Amsterdam 1701

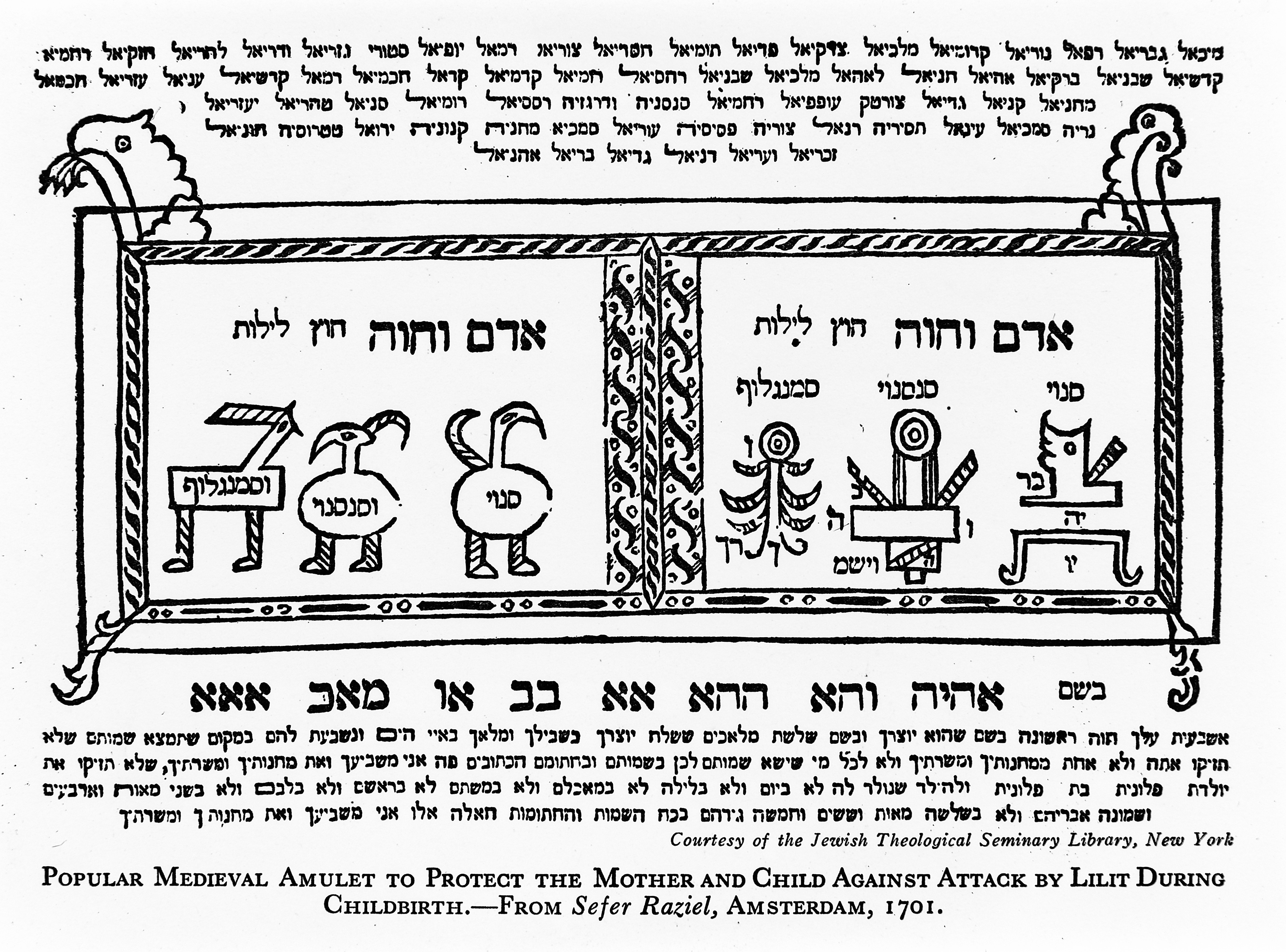
Amulet from Sefer Raziel HaMalakh

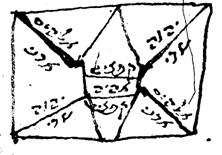
15th century Kabbalistic amulet of Cassiel

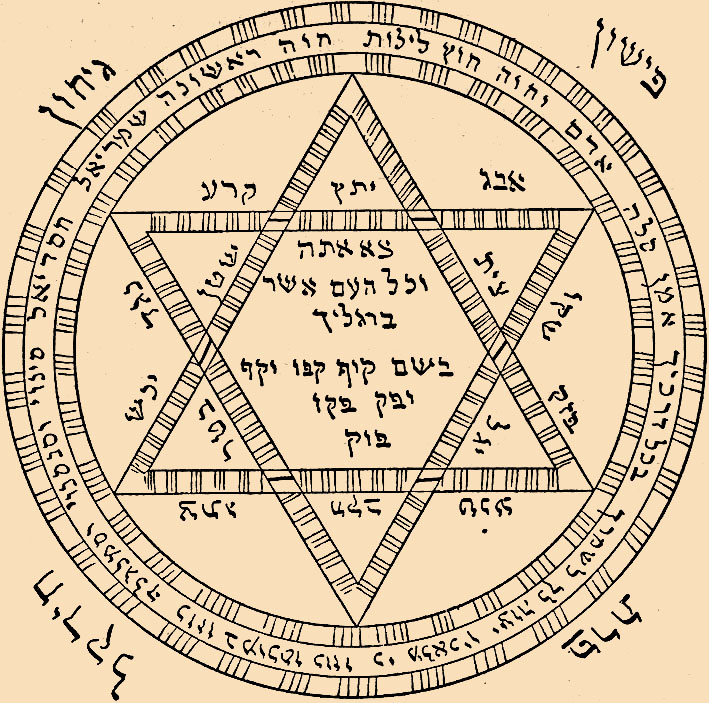
Amulet for protection in childbirth

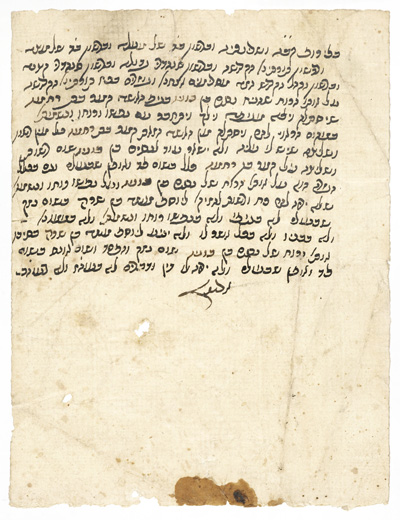
18th or 19th century exorcism text, Cairo Geniza

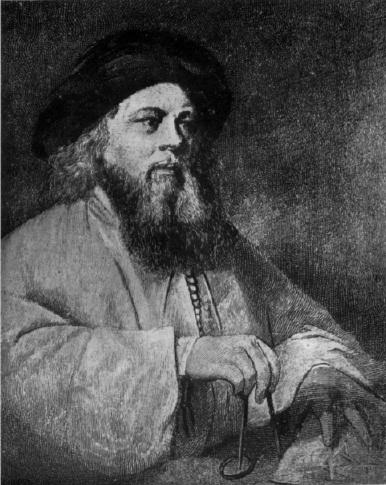
Hayyim Samuel Jacob Falk, Baal Shem alchemist of London (1708–1782)

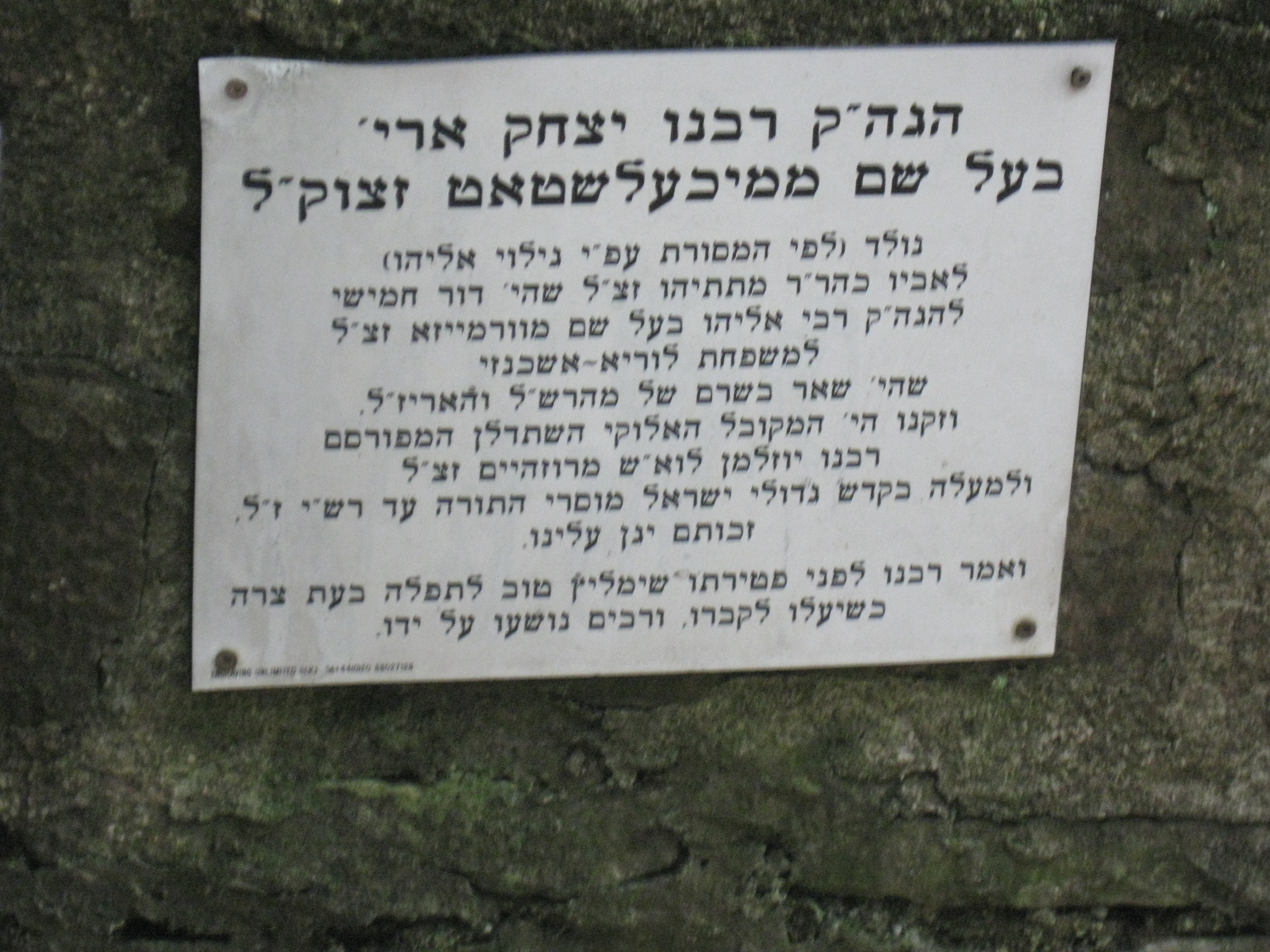
Plaque to Seckel Löb Wormser, 1768–1847, a traditional late Baal Shem in Germany

Amulet of Divine Names, attributed to Hasidic leader Moses Teitelbaum of Ujhel (1759–1841)

== See also ==
- Angels in Judaism
- Ancient Jewish magic
- Jewish views on astrology
- Names of God in Judaism
- Sefer HaRazim
- Semitic neopaganism
- Witchcraft and divination in the Hebrew Bible
