= Baal Shem =

Historical Jewish practitioner of Practical Kabbalah

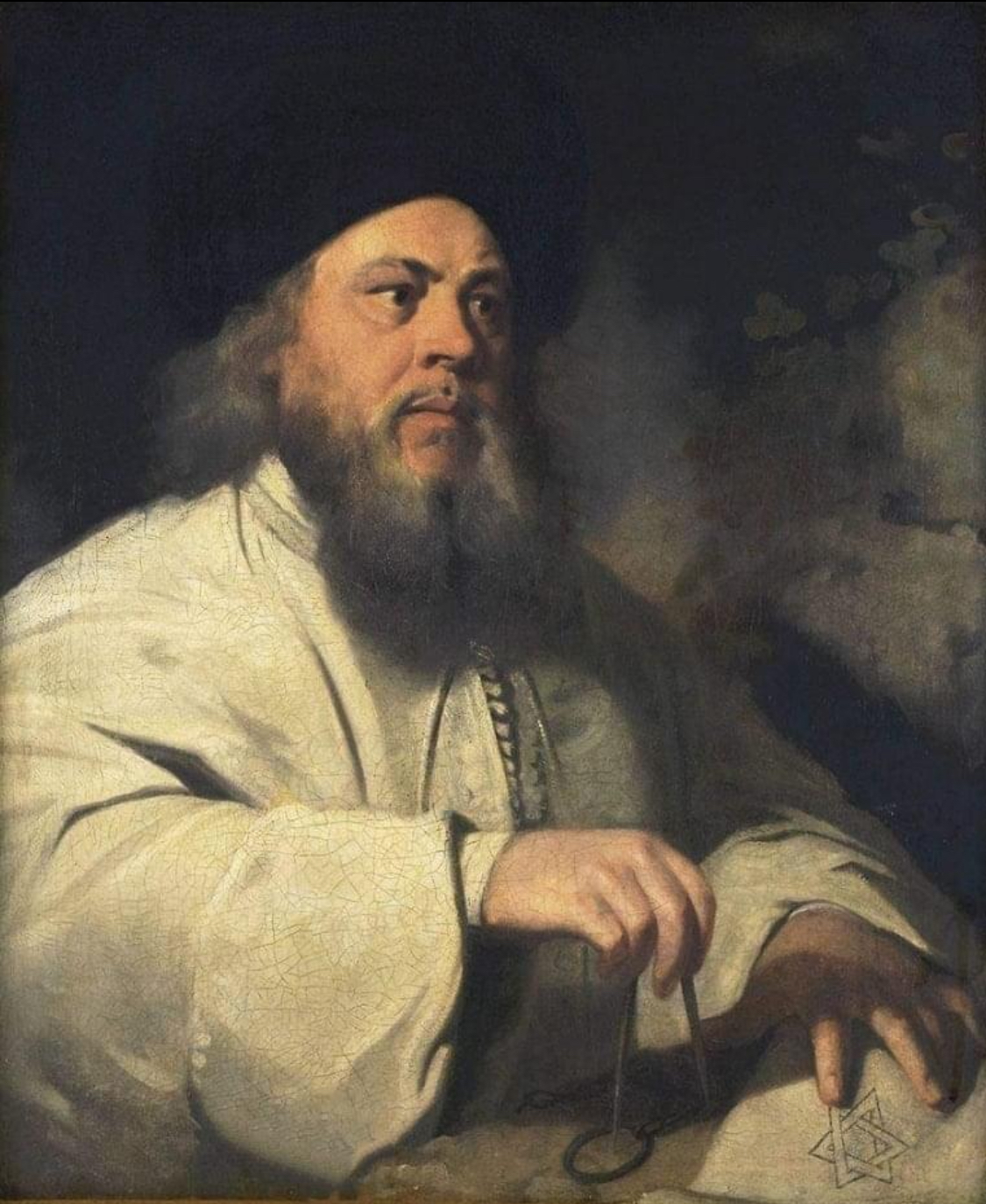
A portrait of Hayyim Samuel Jacob Falk, the 'Baal Shem of London'.

A Baal Shem (Hebrew: בַּעַל שֵׁם, romanized: baʿal šēm, pl. Baale Shem; Yiddish: בעל־שם, romanized: Balshém, plural baléshem) was a historical Jewish practitioner of Practical Kabbalah, folk healer, and thaumaturge (miracle worker). Employing various methods, Baalei Shem are claimed to heal, enact miracles, perform exorcisms, treat various health issues, curb epidemics, protect people from disaster due to fire, robbery or the evil eye, foresee the future, decipher dreams, and bless those who sought his powers.

In Rabbinic Judaism, similar figures arbitrated between earthly realities and spiritual realms since before early Judaism in the 3rd century as noted in the Talmud. However, it was only in the 16th century that the figures were called Baale Shem. Herbal medicine, amulets, contemporary medical cures, as well as magical and mystical solutions were used in accordance with Kabbalistic and Lurianic Kabbalistic teachings in the Middle Ages.

Israel ben Eliezer was a Polish rabbi and mystical healer known as the Baal Shem Tov. His teachings imbued the esoteric usage of Practical Kabbalah into a spiritual movement, Hasidic Judaism.

== Etymology and pronunciation ==
Alternatively transliterated Ba'al Shem or Ba'ale Shem, the term is a conjunction of two separate Hebrew words. ba'al "lord" (Hebrew: בַּעַל, Hebrew pronunciation: [ˈbaʕal], plural ba'ale Hebrew: בַּעֲלֵי), while shem (שֵׁם, Hebrew pronunciation: [ʃeːm]) means "name". For Ashkenazi Jews, this term meant "master of [God's] name", signifying both the possession of God's power and an ability to manipulate it through spiritual means. "What all ba'alei shem had in common was the ability to employ magical techniques for manipulating the name or names of God to achieve practical effects in everyday life. They were masters of The Name—God's name—and dealt in what was termed practical Kabbalah."

The unofficial title baal shem was given by others who recognized or benefited from their ability to perform wondrous deeds, emerging in the Middle Ages and continuing until the early modern period.

Elijah Ba'al Shem of Chełm is the oldest historical figure to have been contemporaneously known as a Baal Shem. He was known to study Kabbalah. He received the title of ba'al shem because he created a Golem through the use of one of God's names. His descendant, Tzvi Ashkenazi, mentioned that people attested to him having created a golem using the Sefer Yetzirah.

Baale Shem were folk healers and also had mystical powers that allowed them to foresee or interpret events and personalities. They were considered to have a "direct line" to Heaven, evoking God's mercies and compassion on suffering human beings. In Jewish society, the theurgic role of Baale Shem among the common folk was a mystical institution contrasted with the more theosophical and ecstatic Kabbalistic study circles, which were isolated from the populace. The Baal Shem, the communal maggid "preacher" and the mokhiakh (מוֹכִיחַ "preacher of penitence" were seen as lower-level, unofficial intelligentsia, below contract rabbis and study Kabbalists.

== Foundation of Hasidism ==
=== Baal Shem Tov ===
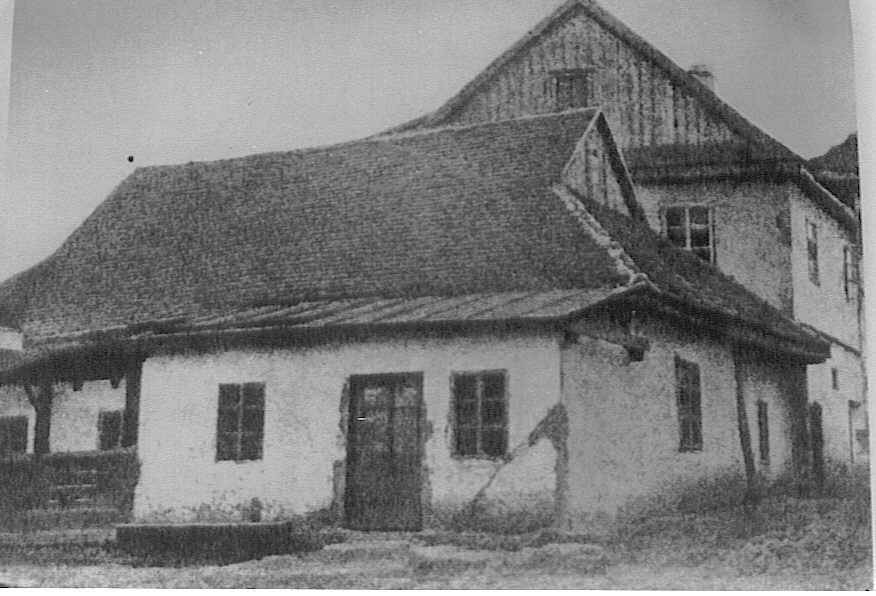
A photo of Baal Shem Tov's synagogue in Medzhybizh, Ukraine circa 1915. This structure was destroyed by the Nazi regime and no longer exists.

While a few people received the title of Baal Shem among Eastern and Central European Ashkenazi Jewry, the designation is most well known in reference to the founder of Hasidic Judaism. The Baal Shem Tov, born in the 17th century Kingdom of Poland, started public life as a traditional Baal Shem, but introduced new interpretations of mystical thought and practice that eventually became the core teachings of Hasidic Judaism. In his time, he was given the title Baal Shem Tov, and later, by Hasids, referred to by the acronym BeShT. He disavowed traditional Jewish practice and theology by encouraging mixing with non-Jews and asserting the sacredness of everyday corporal existence.

During his life, he was able to devote time to prayer and contemplation, traditional practices within the realm of contemplative Kabbalah. There, he was able to learn the skills to become a Ba'al Shem, and practiced with neighboring townspeople, including both Jews and Christians. Modern texts state that he underwent a hitgalut (revelation)' by the age of 36.

==== Contemplative Kabbalah ====
The leading Kabbalist Isaac Luria (1534–1572) forbade people of his time to use Practical Kabbalah. As the Temple in Jerusalem is not standing, and no one possesses the ashes of the red heifer, people are unable to become pure, he stated. Without the ability to reach a state of purity, Practical Kabbalah can be very damaging, he taught.

The Baal Shem Tov learned and took part in traditional practices of Practical Kabbalah as well as contemporary methods established by Lurianic Kabbalah. The Ba'al Shem Tov taught that one could remove asceticism from the practice of Judaism. This allowed a larger array of people to become devout within Judaism, and therefore within Hasidism. Moreover, he taught that the letters, in contrast to the words, were the key element of sacred texts. Therefore, intellectual and academic skills were no longer necessary to reach mastery of the sacred texts.

==== Hasidism as a populist revival movement ====
From the 1730s, the Baal Shem Tov (BeShT) headed an elite theurgic mystical circle, similar to other secluded Kabbalistic circles such as the contemporary Klaus (Close) in Brody. Unlike past mystical circles, they innovated by using their psychic heavenly intercession abilities to work on behalf of the common Jewish populace. From the legendary hagiography of the BeShT as one who bridged elite mysticism with deep social concern, and from his leading disciples, Hasidism rapidly grew into a populist revival movement.

===== Role of the tzadik =====
Beginning with Hasidic Judaism in the late 17th century, the mystical role of the tzadik was established to conceptualize a follower's connection to God. The tzadik was a divine channel that could connect a devoutly religious follower to God. This was the first instance of popular Jewish mysticism. The movement borrowed this role from Kabbalistic theosophical terminology. Hasidic philosophy encouraged devekut, attachment to the rebbes within the movement, who were said to embody and channel the divine flow of blessings to the world. This replaced the Tzadikim Nistarim, which was understood as a list of 36 righteous Jews that connected blessings to the world. It was understood that this list was made up of private pietists and Baalei Shem in Eastern Europe. As doctrine coalesced in writing from the 1780s, Jacob Joseph of Polonne, Dov Ber of Mezeritch, Elimelech of Lizhensk, Yaakov Yitzchak of Lublin and others shaped Hasidic views of the tzadik, whose task is to awaken and draw down the flow of divine blessing to the spiritual and material needs of the community and individual common folk.

===== Replacement of the Baalei Shem =====
The activity of Baalei Shem among the community, as well as the influence of Kabbalistic ideas, contributed to the popular belief in the Tzadikim Nistarim. The new mystical role of the Hasidic tzadik-rebbe replaced Baal Shem activity among the populace, combining the Practical Kabbalist and maggid, the itinerant preacher. In addition, it replaced Practical Kabbalah with the tzadik's theurgic divine intercession. The 1814–15 Praises of the Besht by Dov ben Samuel Baer sets the Baal Shem Tov's teaching circle against his remaining occupation as traveling Baal Shem.

== Practice ==
Baalei Shem were understood to take their power from the holiest of God's names in Judaism: the Tetragrammaton. Historically, this name was pronounced only by the High Priest on Yom Kippur. With the destruction of the Second Temple by the Romans in the year 70 CE, the true pronunciation was presumably lost. In some accounts, the Baal Shem were understood as Jewish healers who had rediscovered the true pronunciation, perhaps during deep meditation. Some stories say he pronounced it out loud, and others say he visualized the name in his mind.

A Jewish amulet with various Divine Names, attributed to the post-Baalei Shem, Hasidic mystical leader Moshe Teitelbaum (1759–1841)

=== Practical Kabbalah ===
Practical Kabbalah is the portion of Jewish mystical tradition that concerns the use of magic to affect physical realities. Historically, leading Kabbalists have disagreed over concerns of illegitimate use of Practical Kabbalah. While Ba'alei Shem used Practical Kabbalah to affect miracles and heal those that sought their help, this was controversial. As practitioners of Practical Kabbalah, they were mocked by rabbinic authorities throughout the Middle Ages and by followers of the Haskalah movement beginning in the 18th century.

==== Amulets ====
A scholar of Jewish mysticism and rebbe today, Yitzchak Ginsburgh, notes that the Torah sanctions the use of amulets. This can be understood as a way of arguing for the acceptance of certain parts of Practical Kabbalah within modern Rabbinic Judaism:

Amulets are on the border between Practical Kabbalah and an external manifestation of Kabbalah, such as name calculation. There is a source for amulets in the Torah. When a great sage writes Holy Names, without pronouncing them, on parchment and puts it into a container which is worn by the recipient, it can possess healing and spiritual powers. At the beginning of the Baal Shem Tov's life, since he was a healer, he used amulets. Sometimes the amulet works because of the faith of the recipient in the spiritual power of the amulet. At the end of his life, the Baal Shem Tov never wrote the Names of God, only his own signature, Yisrael ben Sara or Yisrael ben Eliezer. This was the ultimate amulet given by the Ba'al Shem Tov.

The Chazal teach that whoever receives a coin from the hands of Job, receives a blessing. This is the source in the Talmud that receiving a coin from a great tzaddik brings with it a blessing, so some amulets are permissible. The determining factor is the righteousness and intentions of the person giving the amulet.

=== Baalei Shem and physicians ===
Due to their emergence during similar times in the Renaissance, Baale Shem and physicians found themselves competing for business. Not yet differentiated, their overlapping roles caused one Baal Shem to write a prayer of protection against these physicians:

Preserve me from enmity and quarrels; and may envy between me and others disappear. Let, on the contrary, friendship, peace, and harmony prevail between me and the physicians, . . . that I may be respected in their opinion, . . . that they may not speak evil of me or of my actions. (Toledot Adam, Zolkiev, 1720)

In his autobiography, Salomon Maimon, an 18th-century Litvak philosopher, referenced a Baal Shem that was both insightful and appropriately learned in medical science enabling him to compete with physicians.

== Recorded Baalei Shem ==
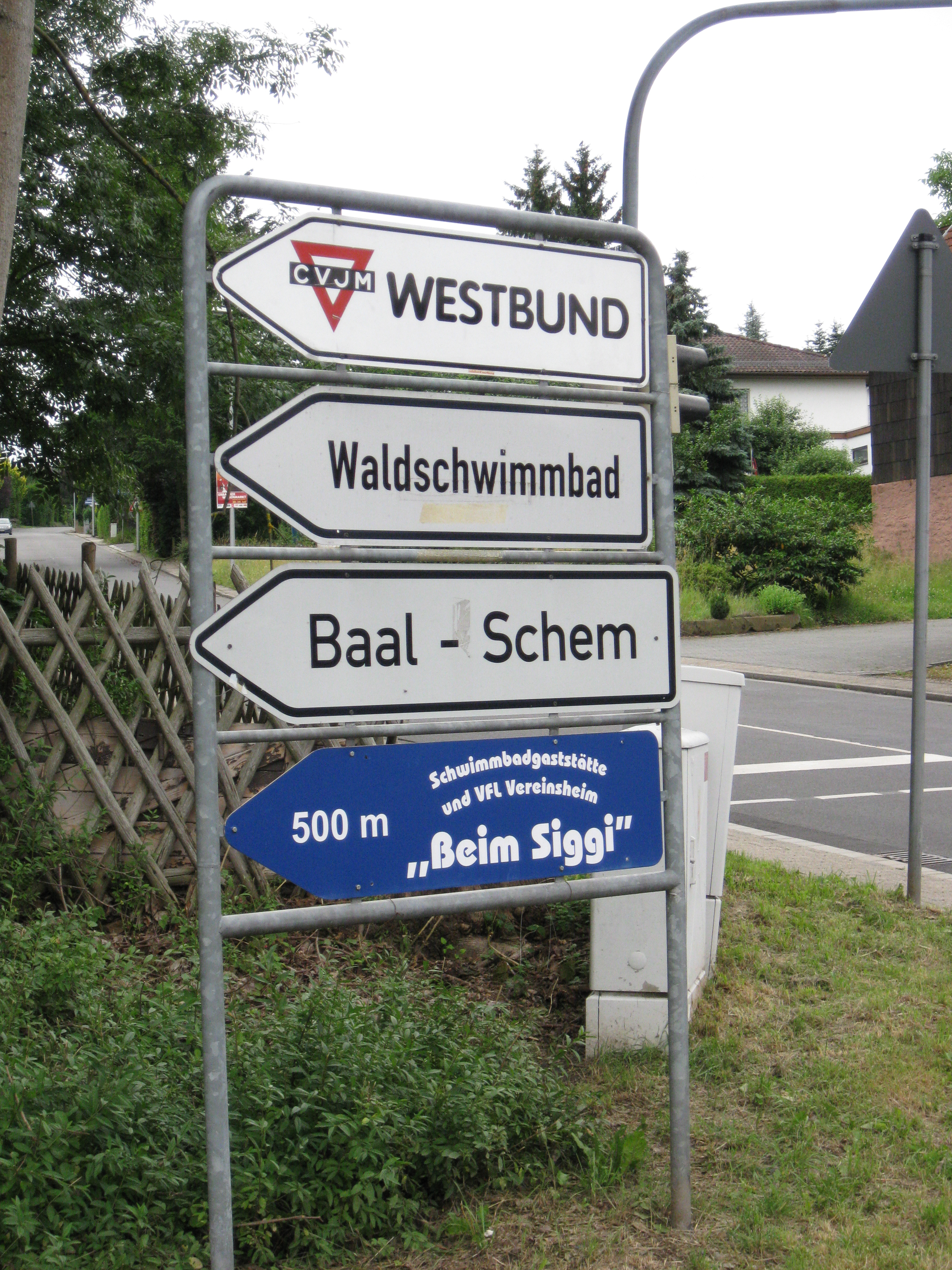
Signpost for the grave of Sekl Loeb Wormser (1768–1847), Baal Shem of Michelstadt, Germany

A rare group of people have been recorded as holding the title Baal Shem The first recorded person to receive the title was Elijah Ba'al Shem of Chełm.

Other Baalei Shem include:

- Elchanan, rabbi in Vienna, 17th century
- Elijah Loans, the Baal Shem of Worms (1555–1636)
- Hayyim Samuel Jacob Falk, the Baal Shem of London (1708-1782)
- Gedaliah of Worms, an eminent Talmudist (died between 1622 and 1624)
- Yoel Baal Shem of Zamość, student of the Baal Shem of Worms and Yoel Sirkis, mid 17th century
- Joel ben Uri Heilprin, grandson of Yoel, beginning of the 18th century
- Selig of Lublin, beginning of the 18th century
- Wolf, lived in Poland, beginning of the 18th century
- Sekl Loeb Wormser (1768–1846), the Baal Shem of Michelstadt, still known in Germany under that name
- Adam Baal Shem, student of Yoel Baal Shem (I) of Zamość, teacher or colleague of Rabbi Israel Baal Shem Tov
- Binyamin Binush, author of Amtahat Binyamin (published 1716)
- Hirsch Fraenkel (end of 17th century and 1st half of 18th century), rabbi in several German communities including Heidelberg and Ansbach
- Yosef of Jerusalem (visited Pinchas Katzenellenbogen in 1720)
- Naphtali Cohen of Poznań

== Contemporary legacies ==
The name Baal Shem mainly survives in Jewish surnames of people descending from Ba'ale Shem such as Balshem, Balshemnik and Bolshemennikov.

== See also ==
- Ashkenazi Hasidim
- Pneumatic (Gnosticism)
- Baal Shem Tov
