= Joel ben Uri Heilprin =

Joel ben Uri Heilprin (Hebrew: יואל בן אורי היילפרין; 1690–1757), also known as Ba'al Shem II (Hebrew: בעל שם השני), was a Galician Jewish thaumaturge in Satanow and Zamość.

Possessed of a fair knowledge of medicine and physics, he claimed to effect cures and perform miracles by means of the Kabbalah and the Holy Name. In 1720 he published anonymously a work entitled Toledot Adam, describing various remedies attributed to prominent Kabbalists. The preface of the work constitutes a continuous panegyric of Heilprin and his miracles. Heilprin had many pupils, who, on the death of their master, "formed a band of charlatans who shamelessly exploited the credulity of their contemporaries."
