= Shem (given name) =

Shem is a masculine given name that may refer to the following notable people:

- Shem Tov, multiple people
- Shem Bageine, Ugandan politician
- Shem Delaney, Irish hurler
- Shem Downey (1922–2013), Irish hurler
- Shem Drowne (1683–1774), American coppersmith and tinplate worker
- Shem Kororia (born 1972), Kenyan long-distance runner
- Shem Ngoche (born 1989), Kenyan cricketer
- Shem Ochuodho, Kenyan politician
- Shem Tatupu (born 1968), Samoan rugby league and rugby union footballer
