= Akiva Frankfurt =

German poet and rabbi (died 1597)

- Died: 1597; Frankfurt am Main, Holy Roman Empire
- Occupations: Poet, rabbi
- Writing career
- Language: Hebrew

Akiva ben Jacob Frankfurt (Hebrew: עקיבא בן יעקב מפראנקפורט; died 1597), also known as Akiva ben Jacob Günzburg (Hebrew: עקיבא בן יעקב גינצבורג), was a German poet and rabbi.

He was the son of Jacob Flesch of Prague, and the son-in-law of Rabbi Simeon Günzburg of Frankfurt, with whose congregation he was associated as preacher, and by whose name he came to be known. His grandson was the scholar Abraham Flesch (c. 1560–1640).

== Works ==
- Elijah Loanz (1599). Teḥinnot be-kol yom. Basel. Prayers and songs for the days of the week.
- Zemirot ve-shirim le-shabbat. Basel. 1599. Songs for the Sabbath, some of which have been translated into Judæo-German, with notes in Hebrew.
- Vikkuaḥ ha-yayin ve ha-mayim. Basel. 1599. A dispute between wine and water, in verse, with a translation in Judæo-German. Published together with the two preceding, and separately, Amsterdam, 1759.
- Zemirot le-lel Shabbat. Berlin. 1713. Songs for Sabbath evening.
