= Eliyahu Leon Levi =

Israeli writer and rabbi

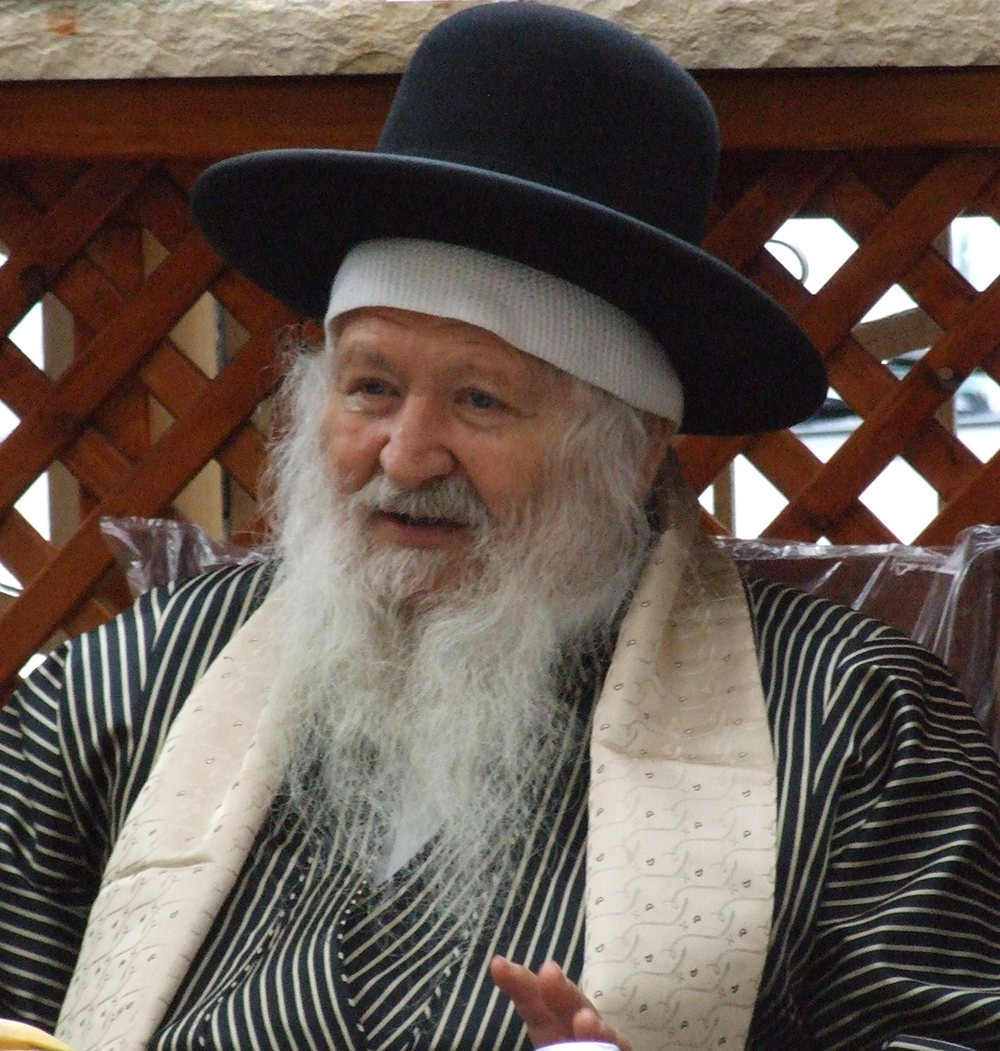
Rabbi Eliyahu Leon Levi

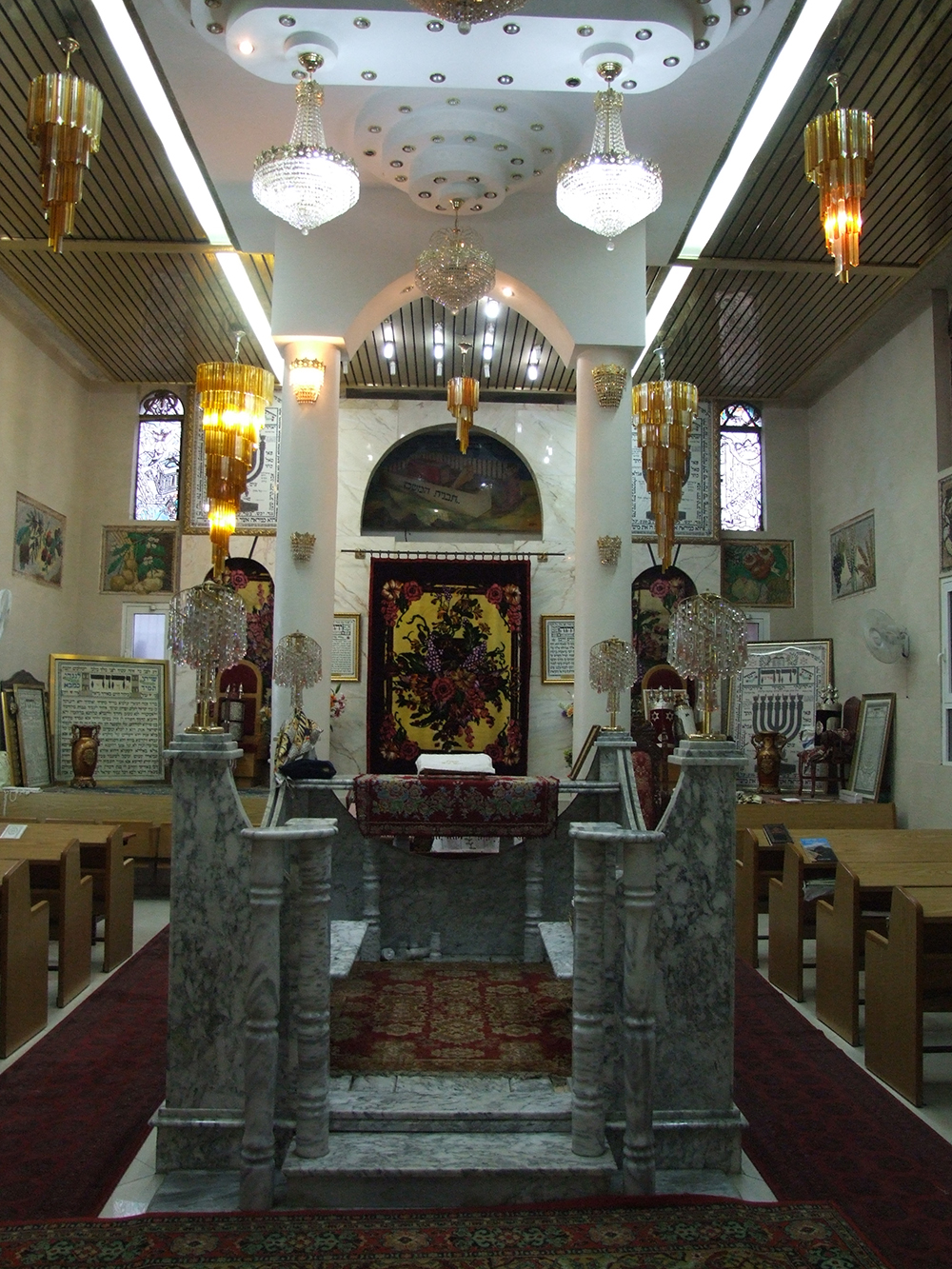
The synagogue at the Yeshiva building

Rabbi Eliyahu Leon Levi (Hebrew: אליהו ליאון לוי), also called Baba Leon, (1939 – July 20, 2015) was a well-known rabbi and Kabbalist, author of the prayer "Tikun-Yesod Yeshuat-Eliyahu".

== Biography ==
Levi was born as the youngest child of Shafika & Rabbi Yeshua, who was chief rabbi of Marash, now Kahramanmaraş, Turkey. When he was 8 years old, his family emigrated to Israel and settled in Ness Ziona, later moving to the Ezra neighborhood of Tel Aviv, where his father established "Ezra and Tushia" Beth Midrash and was the Rabbi of Turkey immigrants.

At the age of 12 he studied in "Ohel Moed" Yeshiva in Tel-Aviv, and at the age of 18 he studied at a Chabad Yeshiva in the city. When he was 21 he joined the Israel Defense Forces and served in the Paratroopers Brigade, but as a child to a bereaved family who lost her son Yehuda in the 1948 Arab–Israeli War, he was released a year later. He married Shoshana and studied for four years at the Beit Hillel Kolel, and afterwards started his Kabbalah studies.

Later he moved to Bnei Brak and established the "Tikuney-Eliyahu and Maayaney-Hayeshua" Yeshiva for Kabbalah studies.

Rabbi Leon was also well known as a singer and was proficient in Maqam singing.

== Tikun Yesod ==
Rabbi Leon authored the "Tikun-Yesod Yeshuat-Eliyahu", a special prayer for Pgam Habrit, and for decades he traveled between synagogues in Israel and abroad to bequeath this prayer. This prayer took place every Tuesday of the Shovavim days, in a night of praying, singing and crying until sunrise. The last prayer each year took place at the Western Wall and attracted thousands of followers.

== The Western Wall ==
For about 45 years, Rabbi Leon visited the Western Wall twice each week: once at the middle of the week and the second time on Saturday night with his followers, where they read the Psalms several times and Rabbi Leon gave his weekly homily. They also visited the Western Wall each Rosh Chodesh for a special Rosh Chodesh prayer.

== Books ==
- Yeshuot Eliayhu (Hebrew: ישועות אליהו)
- Kdushat Israel (Hebrew: קדושת ישראל)
- Tsaakat Israel (Hebrew: צעקת ישראל)
- Mishbezot Zahav Levusha (Hebrew: משבצות זהב לבושה)
