= Dov ben Samuel Baer =

Dov ben Samuel Baer (of Linits) was a Polish Ḥasidic writer of the end of the 18th century.

He is the author of Shivḥe ha-Besht (Praises of Israel Ba'al Shem-Ṭob), which his son Judah Löb published after his death, in 1815. The book, which is a collection of some 230 stories, arranged in series united by common themes, heroes, and motifs contemporary in Ḥasidic circles about the founder of Ḥasidism, is also of great historical value. Baer, being a son-in-law of the Alexander who was for several years a secretary of the Besht, received from his father-in-law valuable information on the origin of Ḥasidism, and on the founder of the sect; hence his book is almost the only source of authentic information on those subjects. The book exists in two different versions, one being the Kopys edition (1815), and the other being that of Berdychiv of the same year; in the latter many legends are omitted which are found in the former, especially those that might give offense on account of their extraordinary nature. Later editions, of which there are perhaps twelve, follow either of these editions, and some are combinations of the two.
