= Schem =

Schem is a surname. Notable people with the surname include:

- Alexander Jacob Schem (1826–1881), German-American writer, editor and educator
- Mia Schem, French-Israeli woman, who was abducted by Hamas during the 2023 Hamas attack on Israel

== See also ==
- Shem
