= Sekl Loeb Wormser =

Rabbi Sekl Loeb Wormser
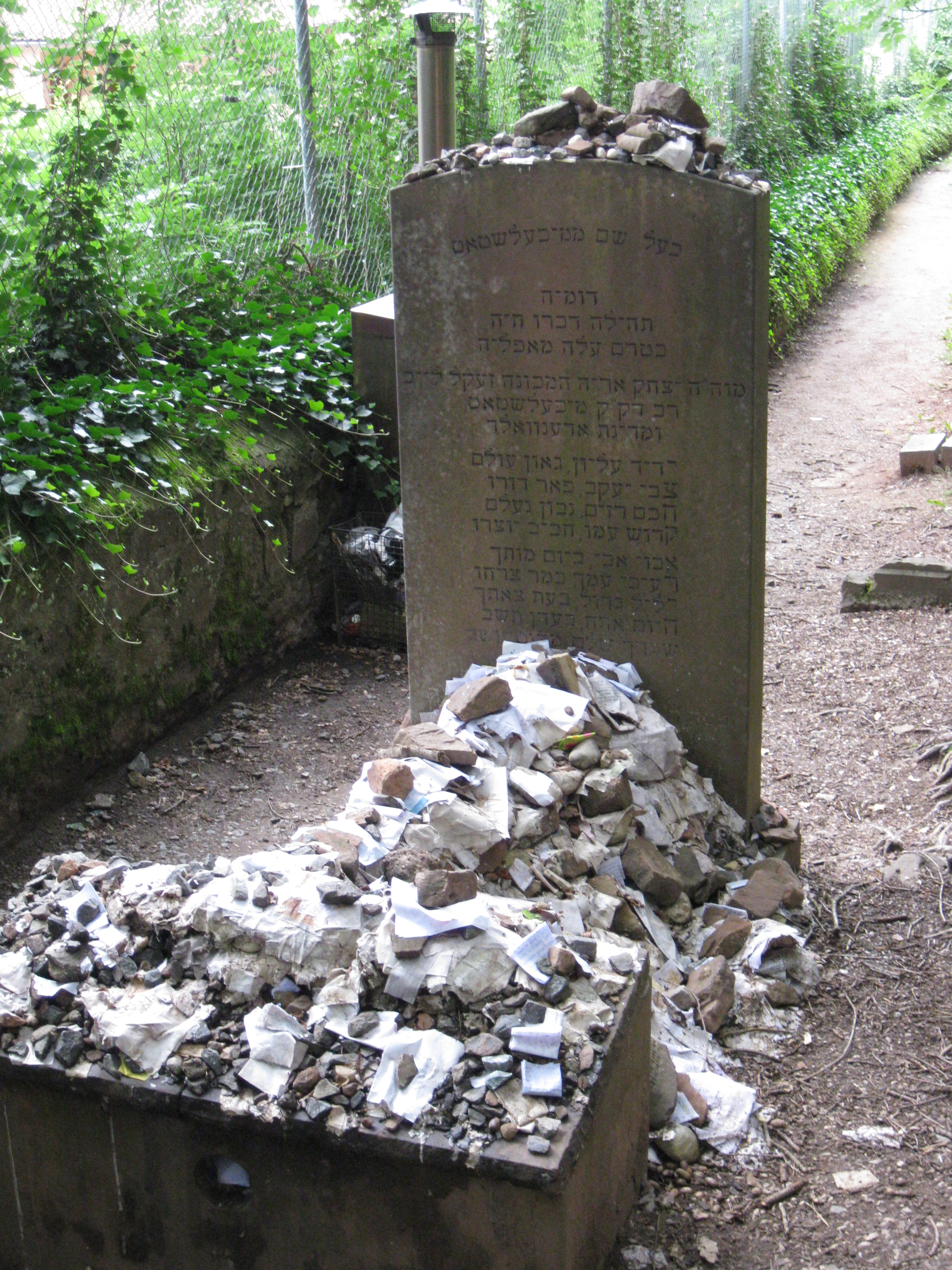
- Kvitlach piled at the grave of the Ba'al Shem of Michelstadt
- Title: Ba'al Shem of Michelstadt

Personal life
- Born: 1768 Michelstadt
- Died: 1846 (aged 77–78)
- Buried: Michelstadt

Religious life
- Religion: Judaism
- Yahrtzeit: 3 Tishrei (Fast of Gedalia)

Sekl Loeb Wormser (1768–1846) was a rabbi, talmudist, kabbalist, and Baal Shem (worker of miracles through the Name of God).

== Biography ==
He was born in Michelstadt. He received his talmudic education in Frankfurt, in the yeshiva of Rabbi Nathan Adler, and following in the latter's footsteps, accepted an ascetic way of life and turned to kabbalistic studies. He resided in Frankfurt for a duration of six years, during which he married his first wife. About 1790, he returned with his wife to Michelstadt where he maintained a yeshiva for many years (serving as rosh yeshiva and instructing around seventy students in Tanakh, Talmud, and the works of the poskim, as well as secular subjects including German and mathematics) and served, at first unofficially, until 1822 as a recognized district rabbi. About 1810, after his wife's death, he lived for some time in Mannheim. For years, his "hasidic" behavior and extreme vegetarianism (at age 18 he vowed to abstain from animal products; a promise he kept until his death) created tension between him and the majority of his small community, but his reputation as a Baal Shem spread rapidly and Wormser became known throughout Germany as the Michelstadter Ba'al Shem, or the "Ba'al Shem of Michelstadt." He denied any such supernatural power but agreed to receive people who sought his advice and guidance, giving them natural remedies and sometimes amulets. (He often said that whatever he does is done naturally and b'Ezrat HaShem). He became particularly known for his treatment of lunatics. Among the Jews of southern Germany many traditions survived regarding his miraculous cures and other feats. It was in Mannheim that he married his second wife. He studied German philosophy and was particularly attracted by Friedrich Wilhelm Joseph Schelling. In 1822, he returned to Michelstadt. In 1825, his house and large library were destroyed by fire. Of his talmudic writings, preserved by his descendants, almost nothing was published. A catalogue of his second library is preserved in Ms. Heidenheim 206, in the Central Library of Zürich.
