= Meshullam da Piera =

13th-century Hebrew poet

Meshullam ben Shelomo da Piera was a 13th-century Hebrew poet in Catalonia.

Other than the fact that he was active as late as 1260 (as his final known poem celebrates the Mongol conquest of Palestine in 1260) and that he lived in Girona, nothing is known for certainty about his life. He may have been a relative of the Hebrew poet Shelomo ben Meshulam de Piera, who died after 1417. 50 of his poems survive to the modern day. He was regarded as a poet of great talent by fellow Jewish poet Abraham Bedersi; scholar of medieval Spanish Jewish poetry Hayyim Schirmann called him among the most original of Spanish-Jewish poets. In spite of Da Piera's respect for Maimonides, Da Piera's poetry criticizes Maimonides' philosophy, and he aligned himself with the beliefs of Jewish philosopher Nachmanides. His poetry distances itself from the older Hebrew tradition of poetry influenced by Andalusian Arabic poetry, and shows influence from the Occitanian troubadour style of poetry.
