= Adam Baal Shem =

According to Hasidic legend, Rabbi Adam Baal Shem of Ropczyce (Hebrew: אָדָם בַּעַל שֵׁם מרוֹפְּשִׁיץ; 1680 – 1734) was a Rabbi and Mystic who lead a group of Hidden Tzaddikim called Machane Yisroel, started by Rabbi Eliyahu Baal Shem of Worms. The leadership of the movement was later handed down to Rabbi Yoel Baal Shem, who in turn handed it down to Rabbi Adam Baal Shem, who in turn handed it down to Rabbi Yisrael ben Eliezer, the Baal Shem Tov.

Different theories are given as to his identity, since the name Adam was rare among European Jewry. According to the Chernobyler Chassidic tradition, he was the grandfather of Rabbi Menachem Nochum Twerski of Chernobyl, whose full name was Rabbi Nochum Shustak. According to Rabbi Aryeh Kaplan and Reuvain Margolies, they identify him with Rabbi David Moshe Abraham (whose initials are Adam) of Troyes, or with Adam Zerweiker. Kaplan also writes that it may be an anonym to protect the subject's identity. However according to Lubavitch tradition, his name is mentioned in the Kherson geniza as Rebbi Adam Baal Shem Miroptchitz. As well, the lubavitcher rebbe discounted him as being the author of the mirkeves hamishna.

He learnt many years in the yeshivah of Rav Shlomo Shmuel of Polusk. He had heard negative things about Rav Yoel Baal Shem and decided to find out for himself. He searched for him, and after realising he was not what others had said about him, he studied under him and eventually became his primary student. The reason for the negative impressions, was that this Reb Yoel was a student of the famous Rav Eliyahu Baal Shem of Worms, who was denounced by Rav Pinchas Zelig of Speyer for teaching Kabbalah. His son, Shammai Zundel continued this tradition onto his student, Rav Shlomo Shmuel. There was persection of these 'nistarim' who went from town to town teaching what would later become 'chassidus'. They were persecuted because they taught ideas from kabbalistic texts. It could be that they were even more antagonistic because of the whole episode of shabtai tzvi and the misuse and interpretation of kabbalistic texts.

According to the Shivhei HaBesht, Rabbi Adam found manuscripts in a cave, containing hidden secrets of the Torah. Rabbi Adam asked in a dream to whom should he hand down the manuscripts? He was answered to hand them down to Rabbi Israel ben Eliezer of the city of Okopy. Before his death, he commanded his only son, who was an eminent scholar, to search for the city with that name and hand the manuscripts to Israel ben Eliezer. After Rabbi Adam died, his son traveled until he arrived at Okopy, where he married the daughter of a wealthy man and eventually gave the manuscripts to the Baal Shem Tov. Both Rebby Adam and the Baal Shem Tov had revelations from the prophet Achiyah Hashiloni. Although the Baal Shem Tov never actually met Rebby Adam, they kept a correspondence through letters sent back and forth, as later discovered in the Kherson geniza.
