= Yoel Baal Shem =

17th century rabbi and kabbalist

Yoel Baal Shem (Hebrew: ר' יואל בעל שם הראשון) was an Orthodox Jewish scholar of Halacha and Kabbalah who lived in Zamość during the 17th century. He became renowned as a Baal Shem (lit. '"Master of [Divine] Names"') for performing miracles, commanding demons and authoring Kabalistic amulets.

== Background ==
Rabbi Yosef Yitzchak Schneersohn (1880–1950) writes in his memoirs that Yoel's father was Yisrael Yosef, a disciple of Rabbi Mordecai Yoffe. Sometime after the latter's passing in 1612 he moved to Zamosc. A year after his arrival to Zamosc he had a son and named him Yoel. Yoel learned for 5 years in the Yeshiva of Rabbi Joel Sirkis (Hebrew: יואל סירקיש) (possibly in Liuboml) who was a Halachist and adherent of Kabbalah.

Yoel married before the age of 20 and started learning Kabbalah. Upon a dream, Yisrael Yosef sent his son Yoel to Prague to learn kabbalah from Rabbi Eliyahu Baal Shem. Yoel became one of the closest students of Rabbi Eliyahu Baal Shem who confided all his special teaching to him. Yoel returned to Zamosc and opened a Yeshiva there which became renowned for teaching both nigleh and nistar.

Reb Yoel had a son Uri who learned in the Yeshiva of Rabbi David HaLevi Segal (author of the Turei Zahav) in Ostroh (Ukrainian: Остро́г; Russian: Остро́г, Ostrog, Polish: Ostróg). After the latter's passing, he went to learn for another six years under Rabbi Avraham Gombiner (Hebrew: אברהם אבלי הלוי גומבינר) (author of Magen Avraham) in Kalisz.

Upon Uri's marriage, Rabbi Yoel appointed him as Rosh yeshiva for Nigla studies, whilst he remained Rosh Yeshiva for Nistar. He was Rosh yeshiva for some 50 years.

== Teachings and legacy ==
Rabbi Yoel Baal Shem (I) was initiated by his teacher Rabbi Elijah Baal Shem into a group of nistarim known as Machane Yisrael. He was the teacher of Rabbi Adam Baal Shem of Ropczyce [rɔpˈt͡ʂɨt͡sɛ] (Yiddish: ראָפּשיץ) who instructed Rabbi Israel Baal Shem Tov in Kabbalah.

Stories and teachings of Rabbi Yoel Baal Shem (I) can be found in various kabbalistic sefarim, especially in two sefarim, Mifalos Elokim and Toldos Adam which earned the imprimatur of his grandson, Rabbi Yoel Baal Shem (II), the son of Uri.

Rabbi Yeshaya Heilprin, son of Yoel Helprin (II), was also a kabbalist and expert in kabbalistic amulets.
