= Meir ben Ezekiel ibn Gabbai =

Sephardic Jewish kabbalist (born c. 1480)

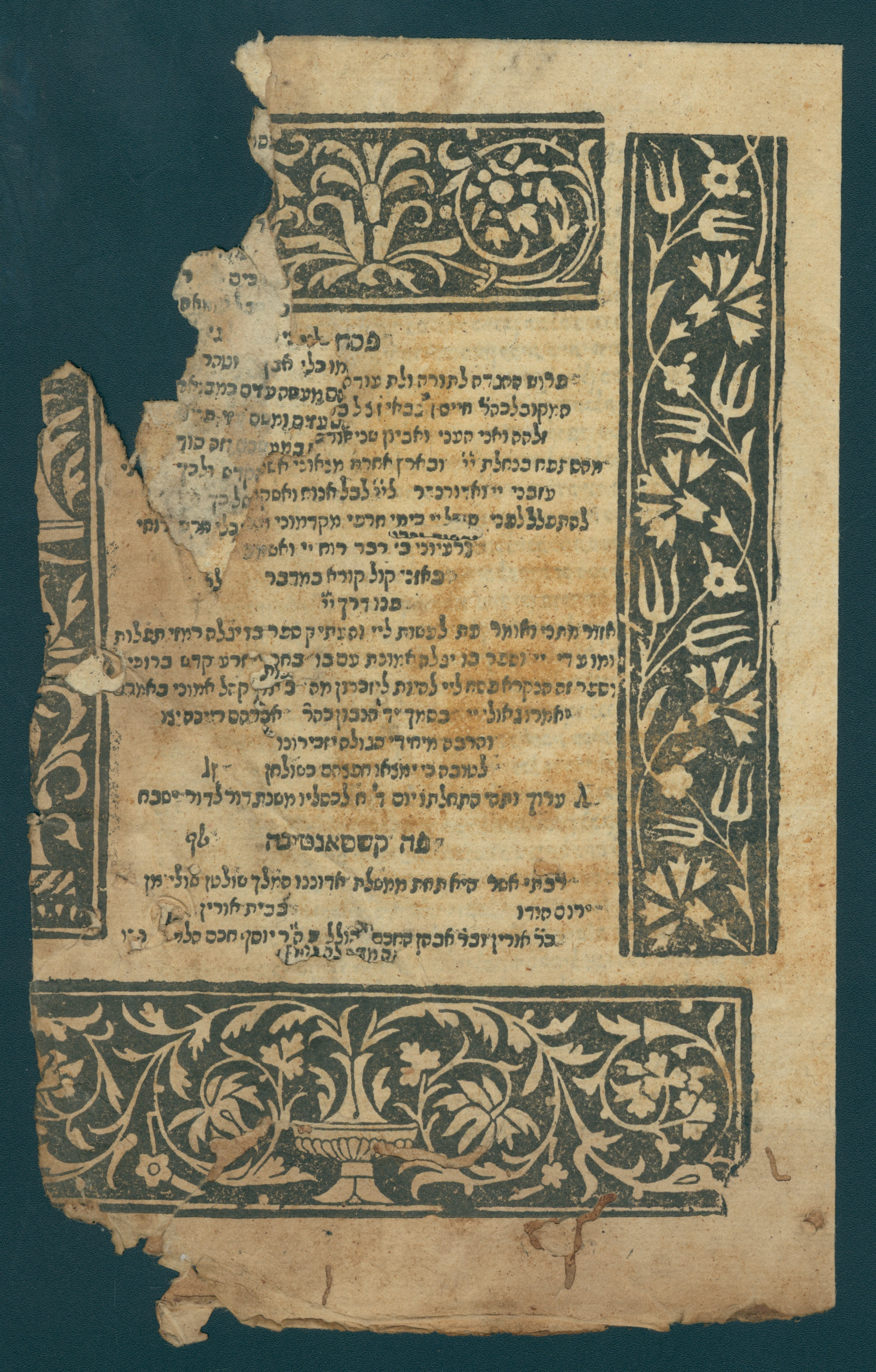
Hayyim ben Mair Gabbai's Pessah Ladonai title page, Constantinople 1560

Meir ben Ezekiel ibn Gabbai (Hebrew: מאיר בן יחזקאל אבן גבאי) was a Kabbalist born in Spain toward the end of 1480. While the details of his life are not known, he likely lived in Turkey and possibly died in the Land of Israel.

He complained in his twenty-seventh year that he had to work hard to support himself and his family (see end of Tola'at Ya'aḳob). He was an enthusiastic kabalist, noted for thorough mastery of the whole kabalistic lore, the most important points of which he, as far as can be judged now, was the first of his generation to treat systematically. He must be regarded, therefore, as the precursor of Moshe Cordovero and Isaac Luria. His first work, completed in 1507 and held in high regard, was Tola'at Ya'aḳob, a kabalistic exposition of the prayer ritual. His chief work, which he finished December 22, 1531, after having spent eight years on it, was Avodat Hakodesh, in which he expounds in detail his kabalistic system, making a close study of Maimonides in order the better to refute him. In 1539 he wrote an exposition and defense of the Sefirot under the title Derek Emunah, in answer to his pupil Joseph ha-Levi, who had questioned him in regard to his doctrine of the Sefirot, Gabbai basing his work on Azriel of Gerona's Perush 'Eser Sefirot.

Gabbai regarded the Zohar as the canonical book of the Kabbala. His system is tinged with panentheism. God Himself, as the first cause of all causes, can neither be conceived nor cognized, and can not even be mentioned; the name "En Sof" (Infinite) is a mere makeshift. Even the Keter Elyon, the first Sefirah, can not be conceived or imagined; it is coeternal with the En Sof, although only its effect; it is what is called in Scripture "His Name." By means of it the other sefirot emanated from God, being the various manifestations through which the Godhead makes Himself cognizable. To them the prayers are addressed, and they are intended in the different designations of God, whose relation to them is the same as that of the soul to the body.

The other emanations are the seven "hekalot," which proceed from the sefirot, and represent in a way the feminine world as contrasted with the masculine world of the sefirot; they are the real vessels of the further development of the world. This emanation of the world from God constitutes the "glory of God." The consciousness of dependence on God, with the striving toward Him in order to be united and become one with Him, and thereby to acknowledge His unity and effect its realization, is the "yiḥud," "the conscious union with God," which is the final aim of the world. Man, a reflection of the highest "hekal," unites in his soul the rays of all the sefirot, and in himself in general as microcosm all the basic elements of being. His soul therefore is in connection with the upper world, which it is able to influence and stimulate by its actions and aspirations; for everything that happens in this world reaches in wave-like circles to the uppermost regions. By recognizing and fulfilling the religious and moral precepts man advances the harmony and union of the various grades of creatures, and succeeds in performing his task in life—the bringing about of the "yiḥud."

Gabbai's son Ḥayyim was also a cabalist: and his son-in-law Senior ben Judah Falcon published Gabbai's first two books after his death, the Tola'at Ya'aḳob with the aid of Abraham Reyna at Constantinople in 1560, and Avodat Hakodesh at Venice in 1567.

One if his disciples was Rabbi Yosef Yutzpa father of Eliyahu Baal Shem of Prague. He moved from Spain to Krakow in Poland because of the expulsion of the Jews. It is said he was a Tzaddik nister and had giluy Eliyahu.
