= Dream question =

Kabbalah dream-based divination

A dream question (Hebrew: She'elat Halom) is a practice of divination whereby a person attains a prophetic state while dreaming, receiving a divine answer to a question meditated on before sleep. According to Kabbalah, when the conscious mind is subdued, the subconscious mind emerges. Thus, in dreams, the soul is being rejuvenated while consciousness slips away.

The early medieval master Hai Gaon notes a method for attaining a dream question involving fasting, purification, and meditation on a text. Based on comments by Abraham ibn Ezra and others, scholar Moshe Idel has identified this text with Exodus 14:19-21, each verse of which contains 72 consonants alluding to a mystical series of Hebrew letters said to represent the true name of God.

Moshe Idel, Romanian-Israeli historian and philosopher of Jewish mysticism, has explored the concept of Se’elat Halom in his research of Kabbalah. In his work "On "She’elat Halom" in “Hasidei Askenaz: Sources and Influences", Idel points to Chagigah 5b in the Babylonian Talmud where God made a promise to the people of Israel, that despite being hidden from view, he will speak to them in dreams.

== The process of She'elat Halom ==
Hai ben Sherira Gaon, a medieval Jewish Rabbi and scholar living from 939 to 1038, recounted experiences of elders confronting the dream question. He recalls several pious elders who fasted, prayed, meditated, in order to go to sleep and receive prophetic revelations. Moshe Idel comments on this, noting that the practice of She’elat Halom calls for the aspirant to fast, pray, and recite verses. He referred to several elders who would fast for a few days, maintain a state of purity through prayer, and recite the letters of verses by their numbers. In their dreams, they would encounter wondrous answers, comparable to prophetic visions.

In some cases, however, questions have been answered in dreams without prior fasting and ritual purification involved. During the high middle ages, the dream question was often utilized by (mainly Ashkenazi) Rabbis to determine Jewish law. This process was highly at odds with the Sephardic (halakhic) rationalism that was represented by Maimonides. R. Eliezer B. Nathan (Raban) of Mainz recorded his experience with the dream question in 1152. On Shabbat, he had inquired out loud, wondering if a glass used to drink wine by a gentile could then be used for Jewish wine consumption. He then took a nap and in a dream, his late father in law came to him and recited verses from the books of Amos and Isaiah that answered the question he asked earlier. The glass was not fit for Jewish wine consumption because residue from the wine consumed by a Gentile was still present on the glass.

In medieval Jewish literature, there is a distinct difference between the dreams from the She'elat Halom practice that occur in the beginning of the night versus at the end of the night. Dreams at the beginning of the night tended to lack prophetic contents whereas dreams at the end of the night were usually revelatory with divine interventions.

In their autobiographical writings from the early 17th century, both mystic Hayyim Vital and rabbi Leon of Modena claim matter-of-factly to have asked a dream question.

== The use of numbers ==
Ezekiel 1 1:1 refers to visions of God saying, "And it was in the thirtieth year in the fourth, on the fifth day of the month, as I was in the midst of the exile by the river Chebar- the heavens opened up, and I saw visions of God”. Kabbalists often believe that by reciting the numeric associations, or the Gematria, associated with this verse, one can access visions of God. This verse contains 72 Hebrew letters and chanting the letters is believed to solicit prophetic dreams. While there are 72 total Hebrew letters in Ezekiel 1:1, there are only 17 initial letters (not containing the vowels). The Gematria of the 17 initial letters (or Reshei Tevot) adds up to be 597 which is also the numerical value of the phrase combining the Hebrew words for prophecy, the name of God, and spirit guide. Thus, this "formula" is seeking to receive a revelation from a spirit guide.

== See also ==
- Dream interpretation
- Lucid dreaming
