= Hayyim Samuel Jacob Falk =

British Orthodox rabbi

Baal Shem of London
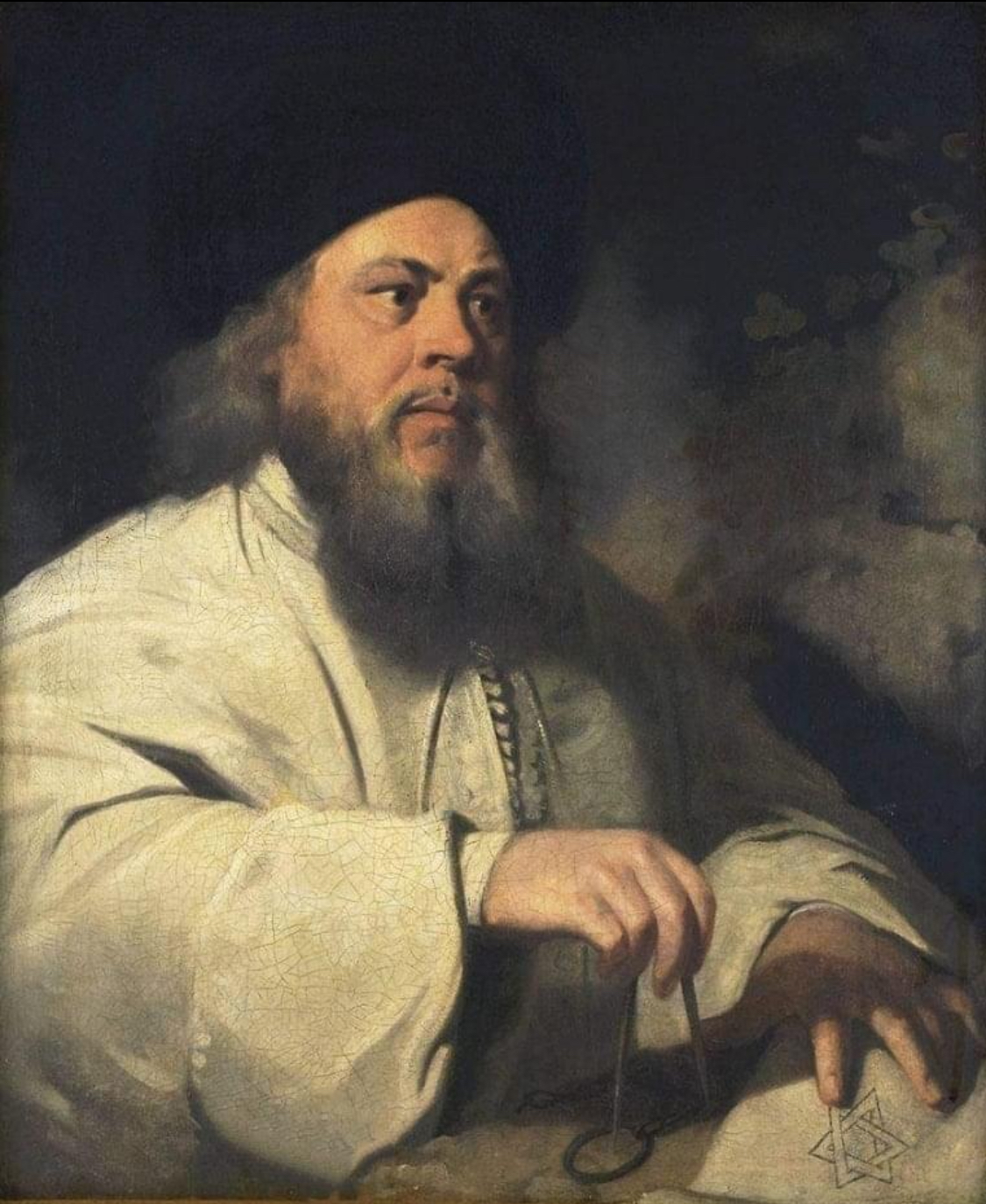
- Portrait of Falk attributed to John Singleton Copley

Personal life
- Born: Hayyim Samuel Jacob Falk; 1708 Fürth or Pidhaytsi
- Died: 17 April 1782 (aged 73–74) London, Great Britain
- Buried: Alderney Road Jewish Cemetery, London

Religious life
- Religion: Judaism

Hayyim Samuel Jacob Falk (Hebrew: חיים שמואל יעקב דפאלק מרדיולה לנידו; 1708 – 17 April 1782), also known as the Baal Shem of London and Doctor Falckon, was a rabbi, Baal Shem, kabbalist and alchemist.

== Biography ==
Falk was born in either Furth in Bavaria or Pidhaytsi in Podolia. After the rabbi narrowly escaped being burnt at the stake by the authorities in Westphalia who had charged him with sorcery, the German Count Alexander Leopold Anton von Rantzau secretly gave him refuge in Holzminden. During this stay there in 1736, Falk made impressive kabbalistic performances in Rantzau's castle, witnessed by noblemen and the Count's son Georg Ludwig Albrecht. The latter's memoirs contain a detailed account of these mystical demonstrations. Sometime after 1736, Falk arrived in London. He lived at 35 Prescott Street, London, United Kingdom and at Wellclose Square, London until his death. He was a neighbour of Emanuel Swedenborg and there is some evidence that he had a significant influence on him.

Rabbi Jacob Emden accused him of being a Sabbatean, as he invited Moses David of Podhayce, a known supporter of Sabbatai Zevi with connections to Jonathan Eibeschutz, to his home.

He died on 17 April 1782 and was buried in Alderney Road Cemetery, Mile End, London. Falk bequeathed in his will an annual sum of 100 pounds to the Great Synagogue of London as well as some Sifrei Torah.

== Folklore ==
Many stories exist regarding Falk's extraordinary powers. According to one account, Falk made secretive visits to Epping Forest in his carriage, where he was said to have buried some treasure. On one of these occasions a wheel came loose from the vehicle on the Whitechapel Road, but followed the carriage all the way to the forest. When Falk ran short of coal, he was said to have performed a magical feat involving three shirts and a ram's horn. Falk was also able to keep candles burning miraculously, and to transport objects from one place to another.

Some claimed that he had saved the Great Synagogue from fire by writing something in Hebrew on the pillars of the door.

== Diary ==
Falk kept a diary containing records of dreams and the Kabbalistic names of angels. This can be found in the library of the United Synagogue in London. In 2002 Michal Oron published the diary and a biography of Falk. The diary is written in Hebrew and is very cryptic. The diary was published together with the diary of Falk's assistant, Tsvee Hirsch of Kalish.

== Notes ==
1.Variations of this portrait, originally subtitled "Baal Shem", are sometimes erroneously used to represent the Baal Shem Tov.
