= Shem Tov =

Shem Tov (Hebrew: שם־טוב, lit. 'good name') is a Jewish given name and surname. Alternative spellings in English include Shem-Tov, Shem Tob, Shem-tov, and Shemtob. It may refer to the following notable people:

== Given name ==
- Shem Tob ben Isaac Ardutiel (c. 1290–1369), Spanish Hebrew writer
- Shem-Tob ben Isaac of Tortosa, 13th century Provençal rabbi and physician
- Shem Tob Gaguine (1884–1953), British Sephardic rabbi
- Shem Tov ben Abraham ibn Gaon (c.1283–1330), Spanish Talmudist and kabbalist
- Shem-Tov ibn Falaquera (c. 1225–1290), Spanish Jewish philosopher and poet
- Shem Tov ibn Shem Tov (c. 1390–1440), Spanish kabbalist
- Shem Tov Levi (born 1950), Israeli singer, pianist, flautist and composer
- Shem-Tov Sabag (born 1959), Israeli Olympic marathon runner

== Surname ==
- Abraham Shemtov (born 1937), Chabad-Lubavitch rabbi
- Baruch Shemtov (born 1987), American journalist
- Joseph ibn Shem-Tov (died 1480), Judæo-Spanish writer
- Levi Shemtov, Chabad-Lubavitch rabbi
- Lia Shemtov (born 1958), Israeli politician
- Moshe Shem Tov (1924–2005), chairman of The Association of the Deaf in Israel
- Tami Shem-Tov, Israeli children's writer
- Tomer Shem-Tov (born 1978), Israeli football player
- Victor Shem-Tov (1915–2014), Israeli politician
- Omer Shem Tov (born 2003), Israeli man held hostage in Gaza after October 7, released after nearly 16 months kept there

== Other ==
- Baal Shem Tov (c. 1698–1760), Jewish mystic and healer from Poland
