= Elijah Ba'al Shem of Chełm =

Polish rabbi and kabbalist

Elijah bar Aaron Judah Baal Shem (about 1520 –1583) was a Polish rabbi and kabbalist who served as chief rabbi of Chełm. One of the most eminent Talmudists of his generation, he is recorded as the first person known by the epithet "Ba'al Shem" having been considered a great saint and believed to have used miraculous powers to create a golem.

== Life ==
Elijah was born to his father Aaron Judah in 1520. About 1565, he entered the yeshiva of Rabbi Solomon Luria of Lublin, and after receiving his rabbinical ordination, became rabbi of Chełm, a position he held for the rest of his life. In 1564, he gathered with other prominent rabbis, including his teacher, to cosign the halachic rulings, which allowed an agunah to remarry.

His great-granddaughter married Rabbi Ephraim ha-Kohen (1616–1678), author of "Sha'ar Efrayim" and grandfather of Rabbi Tzvi Ashkenazi.

== The Golem of Chełm ==
According to Jacob Emden, the son of the aforementioned Tzvi Ashkenazi, the Golem is said to have grown so that the rabbi feared that he might destroy the world. Finally, the rabbi extracted the Shem from the forehead of his Golem, which returned to dust, but the Golem scratched his master's face in the process. An anonymous 1630 manuscript (the earliest known written legend of a contemporary figure creating a golem) recounts that the golem continued to grow that the rabbi had to destroy it by erasing the Hebrew letter aleph, first letter from the word emet (truth)(אמת) thereby rendering it met (dead)(מת).

Although Emden only mentions a scratch on the rabbi's face, a different version of the legend states that while trying to remove the life-giving name of God in an attempt to destroy the raging beast, Rabbi Elijah was crushed to death under the weight of the Golem as it fell to pieces.

Elijah's grandsons, Tzvi Ashkenazi and his son Jacob Emden, were both great Halakhists. They discussed the legal status of the golem: could the golem be counted in a minyan, the quorum of ten men required for prayer. Human form and modicum of understanding were not enough to make something human.

The tale about Elijah's creation of the Golem was retold in the book Israel der Gotteskampfer der Baalschem von Chełm und sein Golem ("Israel God's fighter of Baalshem of Chełm and his Golem") written by Chayim Block and published in 1920.

=== The attic of the Old Synagogue ===
According to the "Jewish Life and Work in Chełm" chapter of the Commemoration Book of Chełm (Poland) (Yisker-bukh Chełm),

No one was allowed to enter the attic of the Old Synagogue. No one even knew where the key to the attic could be found. One person whispered to another the secret that in the attic there lies the golem of the famous Rabbi Elijah Ba'al Shem.

It was said that Elijah Ba'al Shem created from clay a golem who would stand on market days with an ax in his hand, and as soon as he saw that a peasant was going to beat up a Jew, the golem killed the peasant.

An entire week the golem served the Rabbi, the Rabbi's wife, and he performed the manual labor in the Beit Hamidrash [A Jewish house of study where the study of the Torah is undertaken].

When the local landowner found out about the golem's might, the Ba'al Shem led the golem to the attic, withdrew from him the ineffable name of God, and converted the golem into a heap of clay. The Ba'al Shem locked the door, took with him the key, and since then the attic remained bolted."

== German-Jews of Jerusalem and the Crusades ==
According to Rabbi Elijah, German Jews lived in Jerusalem during the 11th century. The story is told that a German-speaking Palestinian Jew saved the life of a young German man surnamed Dolberger. So when the knights of the First Crusade came to besiege Jerusalem, one of Dolberger's family members who was among them rescued Jews in Palestine and carried them back to Worms, Germany to repay the favor. Further evidence of German communities in the holy city comes in the form of halakhic questions sent from Germany to Jerusalem during the second half of the eleventh century.

== Funeral ==
According to popular legend, Elijah's greatness was witnessed in dramatic fashion soon after his death. It was said that during his time, the only road to the Jewish cemetery passed by a Russian church. Whenever a Jewish funeral procession passed by, Christians would throw rocks. Elijah knew of this and requested in his will that no one move or run away if the Christians did the same following his death.

Elijah's wishes were carried out after his death. When the procession neared the church, gentiles began their ritual of pelting the coffin and the Jews with rocks, Elijah miraculously sat up and, after looking into the Torah scroll that was in the coffin [to be buried with him], the church sank together with the hooligans. The rabbi then lay back and became rigid as a corpse again. The Jews stared at each other in astonishment and the funeral procession continued. From this time forward, it was said that the hooligans no longer threw rocks during Jewish funerals.

Years later, pupils of the Kheder (Jewish elementary school) of a teacher named Leib Paks claimed that in the cellar, when jumping on the floor boards, the muffled ring of a bell sound could be heard. This led the children to believe that that was the very same spot where the church had sunk.

== Grave ==
Within the Chełm cemetery, there was a grave without a tombstone which was covered in bricks arranged in the shape of the Hebrew letter "Bet". This was believed to be the final burial place of Rabbi Elijah. Legend has it an angel would appear on the anniversary of his death and etch a letter on a certain brick. Because of this, everyone was afraid to touch the bricks.

== See also ==
- Baal Shem
- Elijah Loans
