= Elijah Loans =

German rabbi (1555–1636)

Elijah ben Moses Ashkenazi Loans
- Title: Elijah Baal Shem of Worms

Personal life
- Born: 1555 Frankfurt-am-Main
- Died: 1636 (aged 80–81) Worms, Germany
- Buried: Jewish Cemetery, Worms

Religious life
- Religion: Judaism

Elijah ben Moses Ashkenazi Loans also known as Elijah Baal Shem of Worms (1555 – July 1636) was a German rabbi and Kabbalist.

== Life ==
He was born in Frankfurt-am-Main. He belonged to the family of Rashi, on his mother's side was the grandson of Johanan Luria and a grandson of Josel of Rosheim.

After studying in his native city under the direction of Jacob Ginzburg and Akiba Frankfort, Loans went to Kraków, where he attended the lectures of Rabbi Menahem Mendel Avigdors. He also studied in the Yeshivah of the Maharal. While there he prepared for publication the "Darkhei Moshe" of Moses Isserles. At the beginning of the seventeenth century Loans was called to the rabbinate of Fulda, which he left in 1612, occupying successively the rabbinates of Hanau, Friedberg (1620), and Worms (1630), in which last-named city he remained until his death. One of his students was Juspa Schammes the chronicler of the Jewish community of Worms and the synagogue caretaker (shammes).

== Works ==
Loans was a diligent student of Kabbalah, and for this reason was surnamed "Ba'al Shem". He was also accomplished in music and calligraphy, and various legends circulated regarding his personality. He was the author of the following works: Rinnat Dodim (Basel, 1600), a commentary on Song of Songs; Mikhlal Yofi (Amsterdam, 1695), a commentary on Ecclesiastes; Wikkuaḥ Yayin 'im ha-Mayim (Amsterdam, 1757), a poem with a commentary; Ma'agle Ẓedeḳ (Neubauer, "Catalogue of the Hebrew MSS. in the Bodleian Library" No. 1832), a commentary on Baḥya's "Ḥobot ha-Lebabot"; Ẓofnat Pa'aneaḥ (Neubauer, "Catalogue of the Hebrew MSS. in the Bodleian Library" No. 1830), a commentary on the "Tiḳḳune Zohar"; a commentary on Genesis Rabbah (Neubauer, "Catalogue of the Hebrew MSS. in the Bodleian Library" No. 149); and Adderet Eliyahu (Neubauer, "Catalogue of the Hebrew MSS. in the Bodleian Library" No. 1829), a commentary on the Zohar.

Loans also edited the "'Ammude Shelomoh" of Solomon Luria on the "Semag" (Basel, 1599), and the "Sha'are Dura" of Isaac ben Meïr of Dueren, to which he wrote a preface (Neubauer, "Catalogue of the Hebrew MSS. in the Bodleian Library" No. 1600).

== Another Eliyahu baal shem ==
There was a third Eliyahu Baal Shem with the name Eliyahu Baal Shem Ben Yosef Yutzpa (who gets confused with the Elijah Baal Shem above), who lived in Worms, Krakow, Chelm, Grodno, Lublin and Prague (also not to be confused with Eliyahu Baal Shem of Chelm). He was born to Rabbi Yosef Yutzpa, an exiled Spanish Jew who made his way to Kracow. He was a hidden tzaddik and never got married until the age of 80. He had a son 2 years later which he named after the prophet Eliyahu, after he was told by the latter that his son would be a successor of righteous individuals who would guide the Jewish world until the coming of the mashiach. He died at the age of 95 just before his son was 13. He taught his son torah himself.

Rabbi Eliyahu Baal Shem ben Yosef Yutzpa held a Yeshivah in Worms from 1590 for 30 years, which later moved to Chelm, then Prague. He was forced to leave Worms on the account of Rabbi Pinchas Zelig of Speyer, who was vehemently anti the publication of the Zohar in 1558 and its dissemination. This tumult even caused rabbis such as Maharal, 24 years his senior to enquire about this Rabbi Eliyahu Baal Shem, to which he set off to see him and came back and gave a report vindicating him. He said that Rav Eliyahu's light would spread to Jews across Europe. Maharal offered him to move his yeshiva to Bohemia and continue there. He then moved to Chelm in Poland, then Prague in Bohemia.

Unlike Loans who is buried in Worms, further proof that he is not Loans is that he attended the funeral of the grandchild of the Maharal in Prague at the age of 108/118. He therefore could not possibly be in Worms. His primary students were Rabbi Yoel Baal Shem and Rabbi Yomtov Lipman Heller. He didn't leave any manuscripts, though he spread the works of Kabbalah by Rabbi Meir Ibn Gabbai from Spain, to Bohemia, Germany, France, Italy and Poland. He spread them after they came to print, from Jews exiled from Spain to Europe. He also studied and incorporated the works of the Ramak and the Arizal as they were brought over from Safed to Europe. Eliyahu ben Yosef Yutzpa baal shem was born in 1536/7 and died at 118 in the year 1654.
