= Kabbalah =

Type of Jewish mysticism

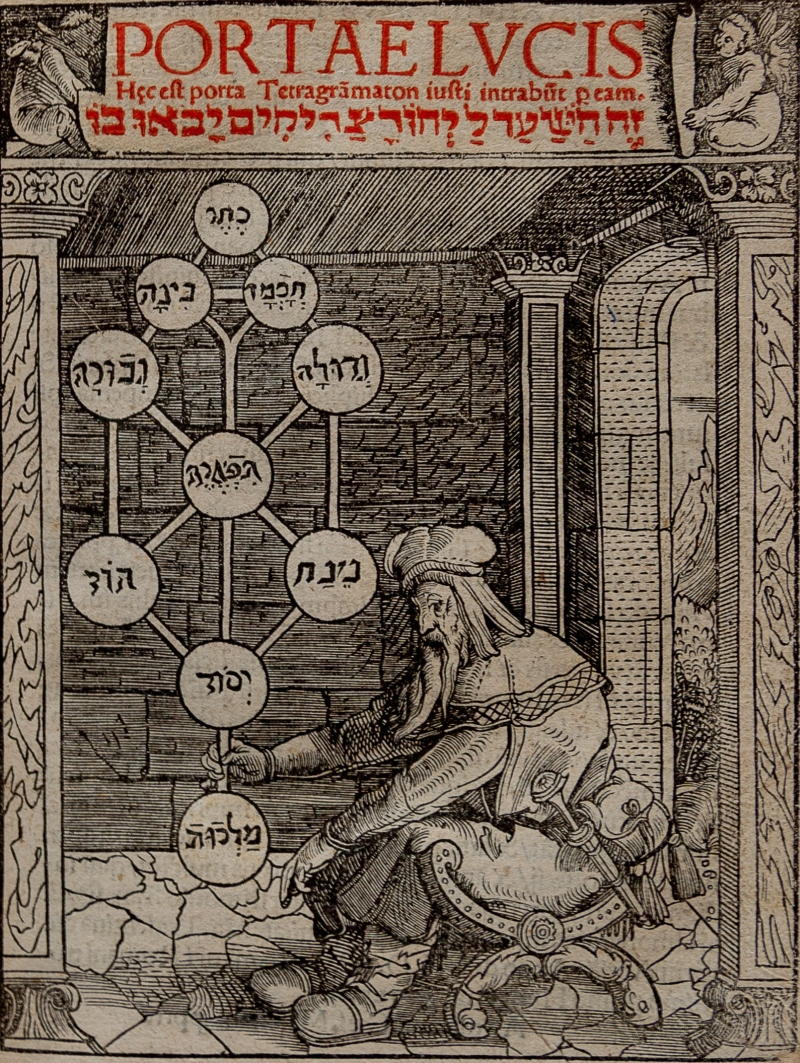
Latin translation of Joseph ben Abraham Gikatilla's Shaarei Ora

Kabbalah or Qabalah (/kəˈbɑːlə, ˈkæbələ/ kə-BAH-lə, KAB-ə-lə; Hebrew: קַבָּלָה, romanized: Qabbālā, pronounced [kabaˈla]; lit. 'act of receiving' or 'acceptation') (Note: Originally a Mishnaic Hebrew term for Nakh, the term was commonly used to mean 'received tradition' or 'chain of tradition' by the Geonic period.) is an esoteric method, discipline, and school of thought in Jewish mysticism. It forms the foundation of mystical religious interpretations within Judaism. A traditional Kabbalist is called a Mekubbal (מְקֻובָּל, Məqubbāl, 'receiver').

Kabbalists originally developed transmissions of the primary texts of Kabbalah within the realm of Jewish tradition and often use classical Jewish scriptures to explain and demonstrate its mystical teachings. Kabbalists hold these teachings to define the inner meaning of both the Hebrew Bible and traditional Rabbinic literature and their formerly concealed transmitted dimension, as well as to explain the significance of Jewish religious observances.

Kabbalah emerged from earlier forms of Jewish mysticism in 12th to 13th-century Occitania, specifically in Languedoc, among the Hachmei Provence (lit. 'sages of Provence' or 'wise ones [of] Occitania'), as evidenced by the Bahir (בָּהִיר, Bāhîr, 'clear'). Following the movement of Jews from Occitania, Catalonia, and other parts of Spain, it was found in the Rhineland school of Judah ben Samuel of Regensburg, (Note: See works by Eleazar of Worms (eg. his gloss on Sefer Raziel HaMalakh), Judah of Regensburg et al. Especially important in the development of Notarikon. For Trachtenberg, the Kabbalah’s medieval European phase really begins here (implying the Bahir is reproduced in Provence from elsewhere), but most follow Scholem and other scholars on this question locating the Bahir in Provence as the root of this phase.) which coincided with the Golden Age of Jewish culture in Spain (Al-Andalus). This included the Zohar (זֹהַר, lit. 'radiance' or 'brightness' or 'splendor'), the foundational text of Kabbalah, which was likely authored by Rabbi Moses de León in the late 13th century. It was then reinterpreted during the Jewish mystical renaissance in 16th-century Ottoman Palestine.

Isaac Luria (16th century) is considered the father of contemporary Kabbalah; Lurianic Kabbalah was popularised in the form of Hasidic Judaism from the 18th century onwards. During the 20th century, academic interest in Kabbalistic texts led primarily by the Jewish historian Gershom Scholem has inspired the development of historical research on Kabbalah in the field of Jewish studies.

Though minor works contribute to an understanding of the Kabbalah as an evolving tradition, the primary texts of the major lineage in medieval Jewish tradition are the Bahir, Zohar, Pardes Rimonim (פַּרְדֵּס רִמּוֹנִים, 'Orchard [of] Pomegranates'), and Etz Chaim (עֵץ חַיִּים, ʿĒṣ Ḥayyîm, 'Tree of Life'). The early Hekhalot literature is acknowledged as ancestral to the sensibilities of this later flowering of the Kabbalah, and, more especially, the Sefer Yetzirah (סֵפֶר יְצִירָה, Sēfer Yeṣîrāh, 'Book of Formation') is acknowledged as the antecedent from which all these books draw many of their formal inspirations. The document has striking similarities to a possible antecedent from the Lesser Hekhalot, the Alphabet of Rabbi Akiva, which in turn seems to recall a style of responsa by students of Joshua ben Levi in tractate Shabbat 104a. The Sefer Yetzirah is a brief document of only a few pages that was written sometime between 200-600, many centuries before the high and late medieval works detailing an alphanumeric vision of cosmology and may be understood as a kind of prelude to the major phase of Kabbalah.

== History of Jewish mysticism ==
The history of Jewish mysticism encompasses various forms of esoteric and spiritual practices aimed at understanding the divine and the hidden aspects of existence. (Note: First published in 1941, Major Trends remains a historical standard on the subject.) This mystical tradition has evolved significantly over millennia, influencing and being influenced by different historical, cultural, and religious contexts. Among the most prominent forms of Jewish mysticism is Kabbalah, which emerged in the 12th century and has since become a central component of Jewish mystical thought. Other notable early forms include prophetic and apocalyptic mysticism, which are evident in biblical and post-biblical texts.

The roots of Jewish mysticism can be traced back to the biblical era, with prophetic figures such as Elijah and Ezekiel experiencing divine visions and encounters. This tradition continued into the apocalyptic period, where texts like 1 Enoch and the Book of Daniel introduced complex angelology and eschatological themes. The Hekhalot and Merkavah literature, dating from the 2nd century to the early medieval period, further developed these mystical themes, focusing on visionary ascents to the heavenly palaces and the divine chariot.

The medieval period saw the formalization of Kabbalah, particularly in Southern France/Occitania and Spain. Foundational texts such as the Bahir and the Zohar were composed during this time, laying the groundwork for later developments. The Kabbalistic teachings of this era delved deeply into the nature of the divine, the structure of the universe, and the process of creation. Notable Kabbalists like Moses de León played crucial roles in disseminating these teachings, which were characterized by their profound symbolic and allegorical interpretations of the Torah.

In the early modern period, Lurianic Kabbalah, founded by Isaac Luria in the 16th century, introduced new metaphysical concepts such as tzimtzum (צִמְצוּם, lit. '[divine] contraction' or 'withdrawal') and tikkun olam (תִּיקּוּן עוֹלָם, 'repair [of the] world'), which have had a lasting impact on Jewish thought. The 18th century saw the rise of Hasidism, a movement that integrated Kabbalistic ideas into a popular, revivalist context, emphasizing personal mystical experience and the presence of the divine in everyday life.

== Traditions ==
According to the Zohar, a foundational text for Kabbalistic thought, Torah study can proceed along four levels of interpretation. These four levels of exegesis are called the pardesim, a Hebrew abbreviation created from their initial letters (namely, P-R-D-S; פַּרדֵס, orchard):

- Peshat (פְּשָׁט, 'simple'): the literal interpretations of meaning.
- Remez (רֶמֶז, 'hint[s]'): the allegoric meanings (through allusion).
- Derash (דְרָשׁ, from the Hebrew darash, meaning "to inquire" or "to seek"): midrashic meanings, often with imaginative comparisons with similar words or verses.
- Sod (סוֹד, lit. 'secret' or 'mystery'): the inner, esoteric (metaphysical) meanings, as expressed in Kabbalah.

Its followers consider Kabbalah as a necessary part of the Torah study, which is believed to be an inherent duty for observant Jews.

Modern academic-historical study of Jewish mysticism reserves the term Kabbalah to designate the particular, distinctive doctrines that textually emerged fully expressed in the Middle Ages, as distinct from the earlier Merkabah mysticism and methods. According to this descriptive categorization, both versions of Kabbalistic theory—the medieval-Zoharic and the early-modern Lurianic Kabbalah—together comprise the Theosophical tradition in Kabbalah, while Meditative-Ecstatic Kabbalah incorporates a parallel, inter-related medieval tradition. A third tradition, related but often shunned, involves the magical aims of Practical Kabbalah. Moshe Idel, for example, writes that these three basic models can be discerned operating and competing throughout the whole history of Jewish mysticism, beyond the particular Kabbalistic background of the Middle Ages. They can be readily distinguished by their basic intent with respect to God:

- The Theosophical or Theosophical-Practical tradition of theoretical Kabbalah, the main focus of the Zohar and Isaac Luria, seeks to understand and describe the divine realm using the imaginative and mythic symbols of human psychological experience. As an intuitive conceptual alternative to rationalist Jewish philosophy, particularly Maimonides's Aristotelianism, this speculation became the central stream of Kabbalah, and the usual reference of the term Kabbalah. Theosophical Kabbalah also implies the innate, central theurgic influence of human conduct on the redemption or corruption of the spiritual realms, as humankind is a divine microcosm and the spiritual realms the divine macrocosm. The purpose of traditional Theosophical Kabbalah was to impart mystical, metaphysical meaning to normative Judaism as a whole.
- Adherents of the Meditative tradition of Kabbalah, exemplified by Abraham Abulafia and Isaac ben Samuel of Acre, strive to achieve a mystical union with God or nullify the meditator in God's active intellect. Abraham Abulafia's "Prophetic Kabbalah" was the supreme example of this—though marginal in Kabbalah's development—and his alternative to Theosophical Kabbalah. Abulafian meditation built upon the philosophy of Maimonides, whose following remained the rationalist threat to Theosophical Kabbalists.
- The Talismanic–Magical tradition of Practical Kabbalah—oftentimes in unpublished manuscripts—endeavours to alter both the divine realms and the world using practical methods like talismanic magic. While Theosophical interpretations of worship see its redemptive role as harmonizing heavenly forces, Practical Kabbalah properly involved white magical acts and was censored by Kabbalists for those only completely pure of intent, as it relates to lower realms where purity and impurity are mixed. Consequently, it formed a separate minor tradition shunned by Kabbalah. Practical Kabbalah was prohibited by the Arizal (הָאֲרִ״י ז״ל, an abbreviation of הָאֲרִי זִכְרוֹנוֹ לִבְרָכָה, Ha‑Ari zikhrono livrakhah, 'the Ari, of blessed memory'; i.e., Isaac Luria) until the Third Temple is built and the required state of ritual purity is attainable.

According to traditional Kabbalah, early Kabbalistic knowledge was transmitted orally by the biblical patriarchs, prophets, and Sages, eventually becoming "interwoven" into Jewish religious writings and culture. According to this view, early Kabbalah was, around the 10th century BCE, an open knowledge practiced by over a million people in ancient Israel; traditional Kabbalah bases its claim on rabbinic discussions recorded in tractate Megillah 14a, Shir HaShirim Rabbah 4:22, and Ruth Rabbah 1:2. Foreign conquests drove the spiritual leadership of the time, the Sanhedrin, to hide the knowledge and make it secret, fearing that it might be misused if it fell into the wrong hands.

It is difficult to fully clarify the philosophical and theological underpinnings of many Kabbalistic positions. There are several different schools of thought, and each has a different outlook; however, all are accepted as correct. (Note: See Shem Mashmaon by Shimon Agassi. It is a commentary on Otzrot Haim by Haim Vital. In the introduction, he lists five major schools of thought on how to understand Haim Vital's concept of tzimtzum.) Modern halakhic authorities have tried to narrow the scope and diversity within Kabbalah by restricting the breadth of texts studied; notably, the Zohar and the teachings of Isaac Luria passed down through Hayyim ben Joseph Vital. (Note: See Yechveh Daat Vol 3, section 47 by Ovadiah Yosef) However, even this qualification does little to limit the scope of understanding and expression, as included in those works are commentaries on Abulafian writings, Sefer Yetzirah, Albotonian writings, and the Berit Menuhah, (Note: See Ktavim Hadashim published by Yaakov Hillel of Ahavat Shalom for a sampling of works by Haim Vital attributed to Isaac Luria that deal with other works.) which is known to the Kabbalistic elect and which, as described more recently by Gershom Scholem, combined ecstatic with theosophical mysticism. It is therefore important to bear in mind, when discussing things such as the sephirot and their interactions, that one is dealing with highly abstract concepts that, at best, can only be understood intuitively.

=== Jewish and non-Jewish Kabbalah ===
From the Renaissance onwards Jewish Kabbalah texts entered non-Jewish culture, where they were studied and translated by Christian Hebraists and Hermetic occultists. The syncretic traditions of Christian Kabbalah and Hermetic Qabalah developed independently of Judaic Kabbalah, reading the Jewish texts as universalist ancient wisdom preserved from Gnosticism of antiquity. Both adapted Jewish concepts freely from their Jewish understanding, merging them with multiple other theologies, religious traditions, and magical associations. With the decline of Christian Kabbalah in the Age of Enlightenment, Hermetic Kabbalah continued as a central underground tradition in Western esotericism. Through these non-Jewish associations with magic, alchemy and divination, Kabbalah acquired some popular occult connotations forbidden within Judaism, where Jewish Practical Kabbalah was a minor, permitted tradition restricted to a few elite. Today, many publications on Kabbalah belong to the non-Jewish New Age and occult traditions of Cabala, rather than giving an accurate picture of Jewish Kabbalah. Instead, academic and traditional Jewish publications now translate and study Jewish Kabbalah for a wide readership.

== Concepts ==
The definition of Kabbalah varies according to the traditions and aims of those who follow it. According to its earliest and original usage in ancient Hebrew, it means 'reception' or 'tradition', and in this context it tends to refer to any sacred writing composed after (or otherwise outside of) the five books of the Torah. Post-compilation of the Talmud, it refers to the Oral Torah (both in the sense of the 'Talmud' itself and in the sense of continuing dialog and thought devoted to the scripture in every generation). In the much later writings of Eleazar of Worms (c. 1350), it refers to theurgy or the conjuring of demons and angels by the invocation of their secret names. The word Kabbalah underwent a transformation of its meaning in medieval Judaism via books now referred to as "the Kabbalah": the Bahir, the Zohar, and the Etz Chaim (עֵץ חַיִּים, ʿēṣ ḥayyîm, 'Tree of Life'), among others. In these books, the word Kabbalah is used in manifold new senses, including as the continuity of revelation in every generation as well as the necessity that revelation remain concealed, secret, or esoteric throughout eras as dictated by formal requirements native to sacred truth. When the term Kabbalah is used to refer to a canon of secret mystical books by medieval Jews, the aforementioned books and other works comprise the canon as well as the literary sensibility to which the term refers. After the medieval period, the word was adapted and appropriated by Western esotericism, including Christian Kabbalah and Hermetic Qabalah, and influenced the tenor and aesthetics of European occultism practiced by gentiles (i.e., non-Jews). Broadly, Jewish Kabbalah is a set of sacred and magical teachings meant to explain the relationship between the unchanging, eternal God—the mysterious Ein Sof (אֵין סוֹף, 'the Infinite')—and the mortal, finite universe (i.e., God's creation).

=== Concealed and revealed God ===
Metaphorical scheme of emanated spiritual worlds within the Ein Sof

The nature of the divine prompted Kabbalists to envision two aspects of God:

- God in essence: an absolutely transcendent, unknowable, limitless divine simplicity beyond revelation.
- God in manifestation: the revealed persona of God through which he creates, sustains, and relates to humankind. Kabbalists speak of the first as the Ein Sof. Of the impersonal Ein Sof, nothing can be grasped. However, the second aspect of divine manifestation—accessible to human perception and dynamically interacting throughout spiritual and physical existence—reveals the divine immanently and is bound up in human life. Kabbalists believe that these two aspects are not contradictory but complement one another, being emanations mystically revealing the concealed mystery from within the Godhead.

As a term for describing the infinite Godhead, Kabbalists viewed the Ein Sof itself as too sublime to be referred to directly in the Torah. It is not a Holy Name in Judaism, as no name could contain a revelation of the Ein Sof. Even terming it "no-end" is an inadequate representation of its true nature, the description only bearing its designation in relation to Creation. However, the Torah does narrate God speaking in the first person; most memorably with the first word of the Ten Commandments, a reference without any description of the simple Divine essence (Atzmus Ein Sof, 'Essence of the Infinite'). In contrast, the term Ein Sof describes the Godhead as an infinite life-force, the first cause, continuously sustaining all Creation. The Zohar reads the first words of the Genesis creation narrative as "With (the level of) Beginning (the Ein Sof) created Elohim (God's manifestation in creation)":

At the very beginning the King made engravings in the supernal purity. A spark of blackness emerged in the sealed within the sealed, from the mystery of the [Ein Sof], a mist within matter, implanted in a ring, no white, no black, no red, no yellow, no colour at all. When He measured with the standard of measure, He made colours to provide light. Within the spark, in the innermost part, emerged a source, from which the colours are painted below; it is sealed among the sealed things of the mystery of [the Ein Sof]. It penetrated, yet did not penetrate its air. It was not known at all until, from the pressure of its penetration, a single point shone, sealed, supernal. Beyond this point nothing is known, so it is called reishit (beginning): the first word of all ...

— Zohar, Bereshit 1 § 15a:1

The structure of emanations has been described in various ways:

- Sephirot ('divine attributes') and Partzufim ('divine 'faces'')
- Ohr (lit. 'light'; 'spiritual light and flow')
- Names of God and the supernal Torah
- The Four Worlds (עוֹלָמוֹת, olamot)
- A Tree of Life and Adam Kadmon (אָדָם קַדְמוֹן, 'prehistoric human'
- mystical palaces and the divine chariot
- Male and female
- Enclothed layers of reality
- Inward holy vitality and external qlippoth (קְלִיפּוֹת, 'shells')
- 613 channels (''limbs' of the King') and the divine souls of humankind

These symbols are used to describe various levels and aspects of divine manifestation, from the Pnimi (פנימי, 'inner') dimensions to the Ḥitzoni (חיצוני, 'outer'). It is solely in relation to God's emanations—not the Ein Sof itself—that Kabbalah uses anthropomorphic symbolism to relate psychologically to divinity. Kabbalists debated the validity of anthropomorphic symbolism between its disclosure as a mystical allusion and its instrumental use as an allegorical metaphor; in the language of the Zohar, symbolism "touches yet does not touch" its point.

=== Sephirot ===
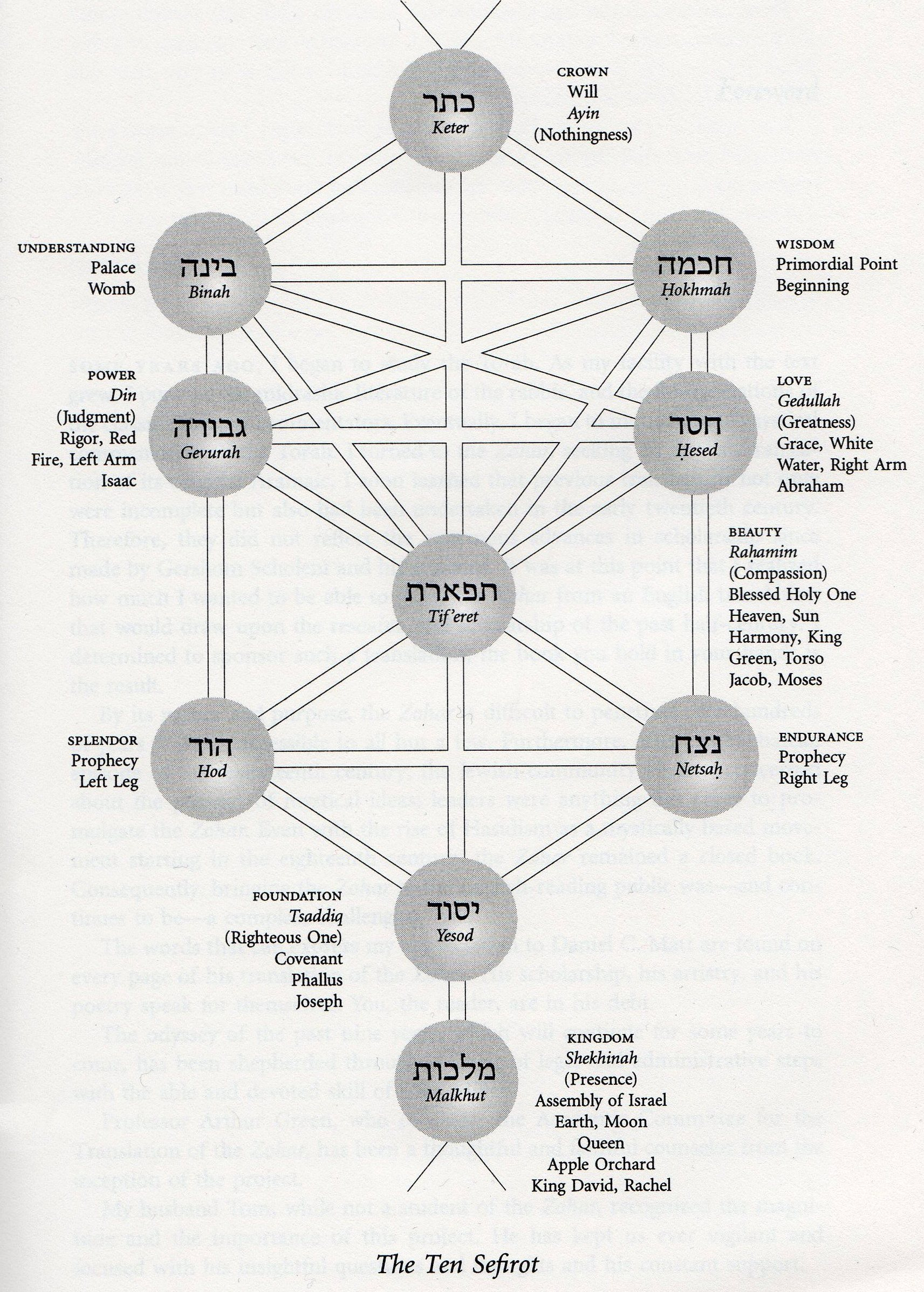
The kabbalistic Tree of Life showing the ten Sefirot with their Hebrew names, transliterations, and traditional correspondences.

The Sephirot (also spelled Sefirot; sing. Sefirah) are the ten emanations and attributes of God with which he sustains the existence of the universe. These emanations are regarded as aspects of God's divine nature, which reveal themselves in various ways. The Zohar and other Kabbalistic texts elaborate on the emergence of the sephirot from a state of concealed potential in the Ein Sof until their manifestation in the mundane world. In particular, Moses ben Jacob Cordovero, also known as the Ramak (רמ״ק), described the mechanism by which God emanated the details of finite reality through the ten sephirot in his work Elimah Rabbati.

==== Ten sephirot as process of creation ====
According to Lurianic cosmology, the sephirot represent different levels of creation—ten sephirot in each of the Four Worlds, with four worlds within each of the larger four worlds. Each contains ten sephirot, which themselves contain ten sephirot, leading to an infinite number of possibilities. They emanate from the Creator to facilitate the creation of the universe. The sephirot are considered revelations of the Creator's ratzon (lit. 'will'). They should not be understood as ten different "gods" but as ten different ways the one God reveals his will through emanations. It is not God who changes, but the ability to perceive God that changes.

==== Ten sephirot as process of ethics ====
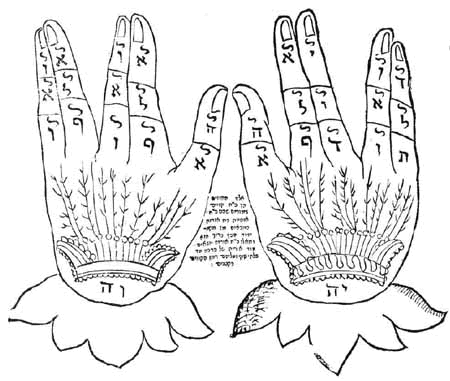
In the 16–17th centuries Kabbalah was popularised through a new genre of ethical literature, related to Kabbalistic meditation

Divine creation through the ten sephirot is an ethical process. They signify aspects of morality: lovingkindness is possibly founded upon the moral justification of chesed, and gevurah is the moral basis of justice, with both mediated by mercy (rachamim). However, these pillars of morality become immoral when taken to extremes. When lovingkindness becomes extreme, it can lead to sexual depravity and a lack of justice against the wicked. When justice becomes extreme, it can result in torture, the murder of innocents, and unfair punishment.

Tzadikim (צַדִּיקִים, 'righteous ones'; sing. tzadik) ascend the ladder of sephirot by doing acts of righteousness. If there were no tzadikim, the blessings of God would become completely hidden, and Creation would cease to exist. While real human actions are the 'foundation' (יְסוֹד, yesod, 'foundation') of this universe (מַלְכוּת, malkuth, 'kingdom'), they must be accompanied by the conscious intention of compassion. Compassionate actions are often impossible without faith (אֱמוּנָה, emunah), meaning trusting that God always supports them, even when God seems hidden. Ultimately, it is necessary to show compassion to oneself as well as to share compassion with others. This 'selfish' enjoyment of God's blessings—but only to empower oneself to assist others—is an important aspect of "restriction" and is considered a kind of golden mean in Kabbalah, corresponding to the sefirah of 'adornment' (תִּפְאֶרֶת, tiferet, 'beauty'), which is part of the so-called Middle Column of sephirot.

The Ramak wrote Tomer Devorah (Date Palm of Deborah), in which he presents an ethical teaching of Judaism in the Kabbalistic context of the ten sephirot. The Tomer Devorah became a foundational part of the Musar literature.

=== Partzufim ===
The most esoteric idrot (אִדְרָוֹת, lit. 'assemblies' or 'sections') of the Zohar make reference to hypostatic male and female partzufim (פַּרְצוּף, lit. 'faces' or 'personas'; sing. partzuf) displacing the sephirot. The partzufim of God are anthropomorphic personalities based on pardesic and midrashic narratives. Lurianic Kabbalah places these at the centre of existence, whereas earlier Kabbalah placed sephirot at its centre. In light of contemporary cognitive perspectives, partzuf symbols can be understood as representing Jungian archetypes of the collective unconscious, reflecting a psychologised progression back to the infinite Ein Sof (or the unconscious, to Jung).

=== Descending spiritual worlds ===
Medieval Kabbalists believed that all things are linked to God through these emanations, making all levels in creation part of one great, gradually descending chain of being. Through this, any lower creation reflects its particular roots in supernal divinity. Kabbalists agreed with the divine transcendence described by contemporary Jewish philosophy, but as only referring to the Ein Sof, the unknowable and impersonal Godhead. Kabbalists reinterpreted the theistic philosophical concept of creatio ex nihilio. Kabbalah replaced God's creative act with panentheistic continual self‑emanation from a metaphysical Ayin (אַיִן, ʾayin, 'nothingness'; complemented by יֵשׁ, yesh), lit. 'somethingness'), which they argued sustains all spiritual and material realms and wears them as successively more corporeal garments, veils, and condensations of divine immanence. Together, the heavens form the divine persona (anthropos). The emanations of the Ein Sof divide into Four Worlds as they come into being:

- ʾAṣilût (אֲצִילוּת, lit. 'Closeness' or 'Nearness' or 'Presentness')
- Berîʾâ (בְּרִיאָה, 'Creation')
- Yĕṣîrâ (יְצִירָה, 'Formation')
- ʿĂśîyâ (עֲשִׂיָּה, 'Action')
- A fifth world, ʾĀḏām Qadmon (אָדָם קַדְמוֹן, 'primordial human'), is often excluded due to its sublimity.

The Four Worlds (ארבעה עולמות ʿOlāmot Arbāʿā) and their letters of the Tetragrammaton.

Hasidic thought extends the divine immanence of Kabbalah by holding that God is all that really exists, all else being completely undifferentiated from God's perspective. This view can be defined as acosmic monistic panentheism. According to this philosophy, God's existence is higher than anything this world can express, yet he includes all things in this world within his divine reality in perfect unity, so that creation effected no change in him at all. This paradox, as seen from dual human and divine perspectives, is dealt with at length in Chabad texts.

=== Origin of evil ===
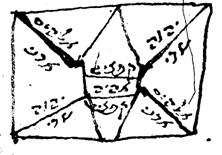
Amulet from the 15th century. Theosophical Kabbalists, especially Luria, censored contemporary Practical Kabbalah, but allowed amulets by Sages

Kabbalah has a unique theology of theodicy and the broader philosophical problem of evil. In the views of some Kabbalists, this conceives "evil" as a "quality of God", asserting that negativity is integral to the essence of the Absolute. In this view, it is conceived that the Absolute needs evil to "be what it is" (i.e., to exist). Foundational texts of medieval Kabbalah situated 'evil' as the material output of the Sitra Achra (סִטְרָא אַחְרָא, sitrā ʾaḥrā, 'Other Side'), with its parallel being all that is 'holy'. The evil forces at work in the material realm are called qlippoth in Kabbalah. Qlippoth conceal the 'holy' and derive subsistence from it; however, they also protect it by limiting its revelation to the material world. Scholem termed this element of the Spanish Kabbalah a "Jewish gnostic" motif—in the sense that 'evil' and 'holy' are dual powers. He also argued that Spanish Kabbalists placed the root of evil within the ten sephirot, arising from an imbalance in gevurah.

Gevurah is necessary for the universe's existence as it counterposes chesed, restricting divine lovingkindness to vessels (i.e., the universe) and forming the Four Worlds. However, if humans sin, actualising impure judgement within their soul, the supernal gevurah is reciprocally empowered over chesed, introducing disharmony among the sephirot in the divine realm and exile from God. The demonic realm, though illusory in its origin, becomes the apparent realm of impurity in material Creation. In the Zohar, the sin of Adam and Eve, who embodied Adam Kadmon, actually took place in the spiritual realms, not the material realm of Genesis 3. Their sin was that they separated the tree of the knowledge of good and evil (ten sephirot within malkuth, representing divine immanence), from the Tree of Life within it (ten sephirot within tiferet, representing divine transcendence). This introduced the false perception of duality into lower creation, external qlippot nurtured from holiness, and an Adam Belial of impurity. In Lurianic Kabbalah, evil originates from a primordial shattering of the sephirot of God's persona before creation of the Four Worlds, which is mystically represented by the eight kings of Edom and the derivative of gevurah; the kings died before any king reigned in Israel (from Genesis 36). In the divine view from above within Kabbalah, emphasised in Hasidic panentheism, the appearance of duality and pluralism below dissolves into the absolute monism of God, psychologising evil. The mystical task of the tzadik in the Zohar is to reveal the concealed Monad and absolute good.

=== Role of Humankind ===
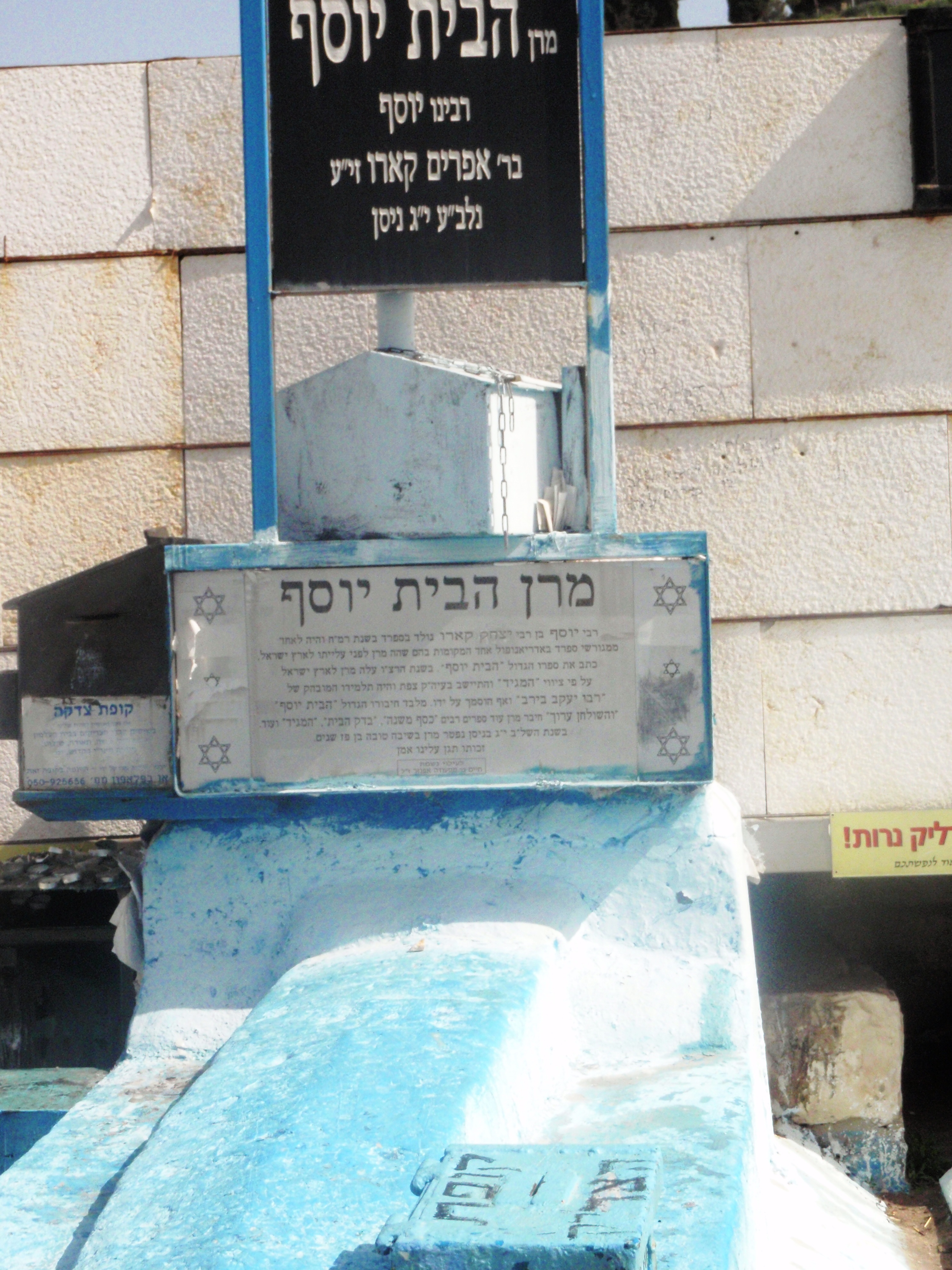
Joseph Karo's role as both legalist and mystic underscores Kabbalah's spiritualisation of normative Jewish observance

Kabbalah gives humankind the central role in Creation, as humans' souls and bodies correspond to the supernal divine manifestations. In Christian Kabbalah, this schema was universalised to describe harmonia mundi, or the harmony of Creation within humankind. To normative Judaism, it presented a novel and profound spiritualisation of religious practice. While the Kabbalistic framework represented a fundamentally innovative yet conceptually continuous development vis-à-vis mainstream midrashic and Talmudic hermeneutics, the emerging Kabbalah accentuated and revitalized the conservative traditions of Judaism during the Middle Ages. Despite its broad esotericism, Kabbalah assigned a central role to the observance of traditional mitzvot (מִצְוֹת, 'commandments'; sing. מִצְוָה, mitzvah) in spiritual creation, regardless of whether the practitioner possessed specialized knowledge. The combination of normative Jewish worship and observance with elite mystical kavanot (כַּוָּנוֹת, 'intentions'; sing. כַּוָּנָה, kavanah) endowed them with theurgic power; however, sincere observance by ordinary adherents, particularly through the Hasidic popularisation of Kabbalah, could compensate for a lack of esoteric expertise. Many prominent Kabbalists, including legal authorities such as Nachmanides and Rabbi Joseph Karo (author of the Shulchan Aruch), also played leading roles in Jewish legal scholarship.

Medieval Kabbalah offered textual and theological explanations for each biblical mitzvah and their role in harmonizing the supernal divine flow, uniting masculine and feminine forces. With this, the feminine aspect of the Divine is drawn from exile back into the Ein Sof. The 613 commandments are embodied in the organs and soul of humans. Lurianic Kabbalah incorporates this into the broader schema of Jewish messianic rectification of exiled divinity. Jewish mysticism, in contrast to divine transcendental and rationalist explanations for Jewish observance, gave immanent, providential, cosmic significance to the mundane activities of humankind's daily life, as well as the spiritual role of Jewish observance in particular.

=== Levels of the soul ===
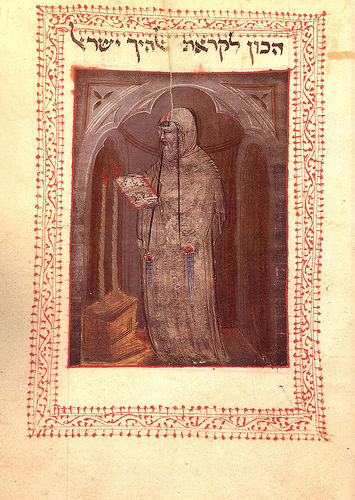
Building on Kabbalah's conception of the soul, Abraham Abulafia's meditations included the "inner illumination of" the human form

Kabbalah posits that the human soul has three elements: nephesh (נֶפֶשׁ, lit. 'selfness'), ruach (רוּחַ, rûaḥ, lit. 'wind' or 'spirit'), and neshamah (נְשָׁמָה, 'breath'). The nephesh is found in all humans, and enters the physical body at birth. It is the source of one's physical and psychological nature. The next two parts of the soul are not implanted at birth but can be developed over time; their development depends on the individual's actions and beliefs. They are said to only fully exist in people awakened spiritually. A common way of explaining the three parts of the soul is as follows:

- Nephesh: the lower part, or "animal part", of the soul. It is linked to instincts and bodily cravings. This part of the soul is provided at birth.
- Ruach: the middle soul, the "spirit". It contains the moral virtues and the ability to distinguish between good and evil.
- Neshamah: the higher soul, or "super-soul". This separates humankind from all other life-forms. It is related to the intellect and allows humans to enjoy and benefit from the afterlife. It allows one to have some awareness of God's existence and presence.
- Chayyah (pronounced [χaˈja]; חַיָּה, ḥayyāh, 'that which is alive'): The part of the soul that allows one to have an awareness of the divine life force itself.
- Yehidah (pronounced [jəχiˈda]; יְחִידָה, yəḥīdāh, 'one-of-a-kind'): The highest plane of the soul, in which one can achieve as full a union with God as is possible.

=== Reincarnation ===
Reincarnation, the transmigration of the soul into a new body after death, was incorporated into mystical Jewish thought as a core principle of Kabbalah beginning in the medieval period. It is known in this tradition as gilgul neshamot (גִּלְגּוּל נְשָׁמוֹת, gilgūl nəšāmôt, 'cycles of the soul'). Gilgul neshamot is not explicitly mentioned in the Hebrew Bible or in the classical Rabbinic literature, which provided reason for its dismissal by some medieval Jewish philosophers. Nonetheless, Kabbalists interpreted various scriptural passages as allusions to gilgulim (גִּלְגּוּלִים, gilgūlîm, lit. 'transmigrations' or 'reincarnations') to support its theological significance. The idea gained prominence through the teachings of Isaac Luria, who systematized it as the individual's personal process of spiritual rectification aligned with the cosmic order. With the influence of Lurianic Kabbalah and Hasidic Judaism, reincarnation gradually became a widespread motif in popular Jewish culture and literature, reflecting its spiritual importance and mystical significance.

=== Tzimtzum, Shevirah and Tikkun ===
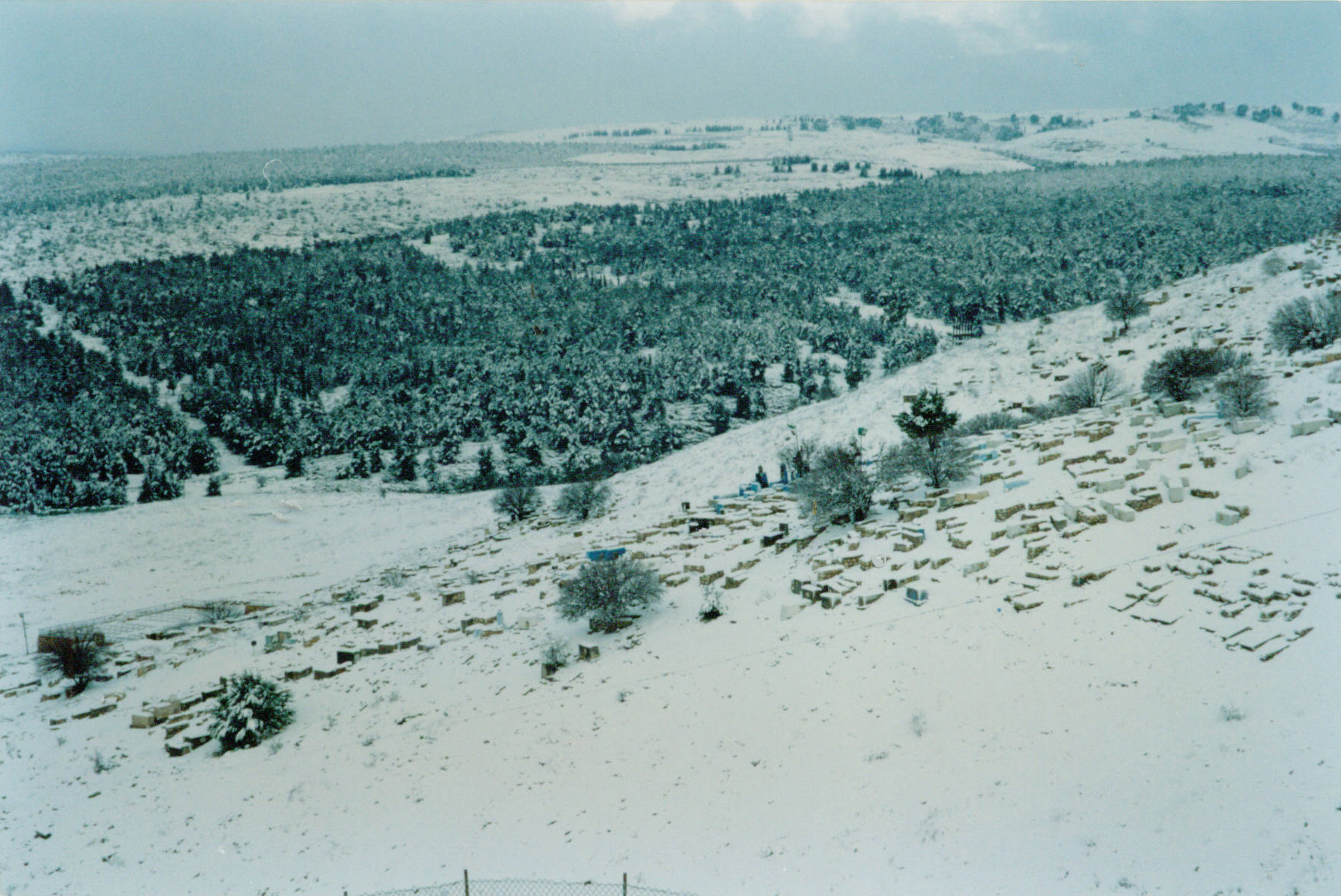
16th-century graves of Safed, Galilee. The messianic focus of its mystical renaissance culminated in Lurianic thought.

Tzimtzum (צִמְצוּם, ṣimṣûm, 'contraction') designates the primordial, cosmic act in which God "contracted" his infinite light, thereby producing a void into which the light of existence could subsequently be poured. This contraction enabled the emergence of an independent ontological realm that would not be nullified by the pristine infinitude of God, reconciling the unity of the Ein Sof with the plurality of creation. The initial creative act was thus reframed as one of withdrawal or exile, in tension with the will of God. A subsequent emanation following the tzimtzum illuminated the vacuum to initiate the creation of the world, but this process generated an instability termed tohu (תֹּהוּ, tōhû, lit. 'chaos' or 'formlessness'). The instability culminated in the crisis of shevirah (שְׁבִירָה, šebîrâ, 'shattering'), the breaking of the sephirotic vessels. The fragments of these vessels descended into lower realms, animated by residual divine light, thereby producing a primordial exile within the Tree of Life prior to the creation of humankind. The exile and enclothement of higher divinity within lower realms necessitated human participation in the process of tikkun olam (תִּיקּוּן עוֹלָם, tiqqûn ʿôlām, 'rectification [of the] world'). Rectification in the upper worlds corresponded to the reorganization of the sephirot into relational structures. From this catastrophe emerged both the possibility of self-aware creation and the imperative of cosmic repair.

According to the interpretations of Isaac Luria, the catastrophe originated in the unwillingness of the residual imprint left by the tzimtzum to integrate with the new vitality that initiated creation. The process was arranged to harmonize the Divine with the latent potential of evil. The creation of Adam was intended to redeem existence, but his transgression precipitated a renewed shevirah of divine vitality, thereby requiring the giving of the Torah to inaugurate messianic rectification. Historical and individual narratives thus became the ongoing account of reclaiming exiled divine sparks.

=== Linguistic mysticism and the mystical Torah ===
Kabbalistic thought extended biblical and midrashic notions that God enacted Creation through the Hebrew language and through the Torah into a full linguistic mysticism. In Jewish mysticism, every detail of the Hebrew Bible—its letters, words, numbers, and even the accents used in Torah reading—carries hidden spiritual meaning. These meanings are not just symbolic; they are seen as ways of connecting everyday religious ideas to deeper spiritual dimensions. Mystics developed special methods of Jewish mystical exegesis to uncover these layers.

The names of God hold particular importance, but in fact the entire Torah is understood as one vast Divine name. Hebrew itself is viewed as a sacred language: the names of things are thought to channel their spiritual life-force. Holy living and adherence to mitzvot are not only moral or ritual obligations but are seen as ways God's presence is revealed in the world—both in transcendent mystery and in tangible experience.

Mystics describe the Torah as having infinite layers of meaning, reflecting the infinite nature of God (Ein Sof). This is symbolized by the two trees in the Garden of Eden: the Tree of the Knowledge of Good and Evil, which represents the external, practical Torah of laws and commandments, and the Tree of Life, which represents the inner, limitless Torah of spiritual wisdom. The outer Torah is like a garment that contains the inner Torah's endless depth.

In later mystical thought, especially in Lurianic Kabbalah, each of the 600,000 root souls of Israel is said to have its own unique interpretation of the Torah. This reflects the idea that "God, the Torah, and Israel are all One"—a unity whereby the Divine wisdom, sacred text, and the people themselves are inseparably connected.

The reapers of the Field are the Comrades, masters of this wisdom, because Malkhut is called the Apple Field, and She grows sprouts of secrets and new meanings of Torah. Those who constantly create new interpretations of Torah are the ones who reap Her.

As early as the 1st century BCE, Jews believed that the Torah and other canonical texts contained encoded messages and hidden meanings. Gematria is one method for discovering its hidden meanings. In this system, each Hebrew letter also represents a number. By converting letters to numbers, Kabbalists were able to find a hidden meaning in each word. This method of interpretation was used extensively by various schools.

In contemporary interpretations of Kabbalah, Sanford Drob makes cognitive sense of this linguistic mythos by relating it to postmodern philosophical concepts described by Jacques Derrida and others, in which all reality embodies narrative texts with an infinite plurality of meanings brought by the reader. In this dialogue, Kabbalah survives the nihilism of deconstruction by incorporating its own Lurianic shevirah and by the dialectical paradox in which man and God imply each other.

== Cognition, mysticism, or values ==
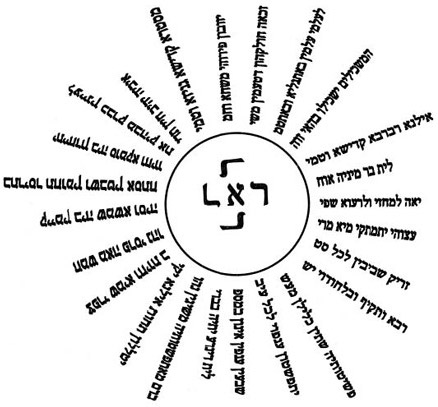
A swastika composed of Hebrew letters as a mystical symbol from the Jewish Kabbalistic work Parashat Eliezer, from the 18th century or earlier

=== Kabbalists as mystics ===
The founder of the academic study of Jewish mysticism, Gershom Scholem, privileged an intellectual view of the nature of Kabbalistic symbols as dialectic theosophical speculation. In contrast, contemporary scholarship by Moshe Idel and Elliot R. Wolfson has advanced a phenomenological understanding of the mystical nature of Kabbalistic experience, grounded in close readings of historical texts. Wolfson has shown that among the closed elite circles of mystical activity, medieval Theosophical Kabbalists held that an intellectual view of their symbols was secondary to the experiential. In the context of medieval Jewish philosophical debates on the role of imagination in biblical prophecy, and essentialist versus instrumental Kabbalistic debates about the relation of sephirot to God, they saw meditation upon the sephirot as a vehicle for prophecy. Judaism's ban on physical iconography, along with anthropomorphic metaphors for Divinity in the Hebrew Bible and Midrash, enabled their internal visualisation of the divine sephirot anthropos in imagination. Disclosure of the aniconic in iconic internal psychology involved sublimatory revelation of Kabbalah's sexual unifications. Previous academic distinction between Theosophical versus Abulafian Ecstatic–Prophetic Kabbalah overstated their division of aims, which revolved around visual versus verbal/auditory views of prophecy. In addition, throughout the history of Judaic Kabbalah, the greatest mystics claimed to receive new teachings from Elijah the Prophet, the souls of earlier sages (a ritual of Lurianic meditation was to prostrate at the graves of Talmudic Tannaim, Amoraim and Kabbalists), the soul of the Mishnah, ascents during sleep, heavenly messengers, etc. A tradition of parapsychological abilities, psychic knowledge, and theurgic intercessions in heaven for the community is recounted in the hagiographic works Praises of the Ari, Praises of the Besht, and in many other Kabbalistic and Hasidic tales. Kabbalistic and Hasidic texts are concerned with translating themselves from intellectual exegesis and theory into religious practice, including the prophetic drawing of new mystical revelations in the Torah. The mythological symbols Kabbalah uses to answer philosophical questions themselves invite mystical contemplation, intuitive apprehension, and psychological engagement.

=== Paradoxical coincidence of opposites ===
Modern thinkers such as Sanford Drob have sought to connect Kabbalah with contemporary philosophy and postmodern psychology. He explains that many of its symbols express the idea that opposites can be united in a deeper truth. For example, Ein Sof (lit. 'no-end') is beyond the contrast between ayin (lit. 'nothingness') and yesh (lit. 'somethingness'). The sephirot act as bridges between unity and diversity. Humanity is seen as both divine (Adam Qadmon) and human. Tzimtzum, the 'contraction' of divine light, is understood as both real and illusory depending on perspective. Good and evil are linked: the qlippoth (lit. 'husks' or 'shells') are said to come from divinity, while good arises only through overcoming evil. Existence itself is described as partial, shaped by tzimtzum, in both the World of Chaos and the World of Rectification. God experiences the world through humanity, and humanity completes the partzufim—the divine personas.

In this view, Kabbalah presents a reciprocal theology: theism and humanism (or even atheism) are seen as two sides of a larger truth, each incomplete on its own but meaningful together. The Chabad–Hasidic teacher Aaron HaLevi ben Moses of Staroselye expressed this idea by saying that the truth of any concept is revealed only in its opposite.

=== Metaphysics or axiology ===
They wish to convey here that if arms were a disgrace to the hero, it would not have used them as a parable for words of Torah. Instead, they are an adornment for him, so the verse used them for its parable, saying that he should have words of Torah and wisdom in hand, like the sword on the hero’s thigh, girded and accessible to him whenever he wishes to unsheathe it and use it to overpower his fellow—this is his glory and splendor. This is the idea wherever they expound a midrashic parable or allegory; they believe that both "the internal and external" are true.

— Nahmanides

By expressing itself through symbols and myths that resist single interpretations, Theosophical Kabbalah integrates elements of philosophy, Jewish theology, psychology and depth psychology, mysticism and meditation, Jewish exegesis, theurgy, and ethics, while also overlapping with theories that include magical components. Its symbols can be read as questions that contain their own answers. For example, the Kabbalistic sephirah chokhmah (pronounced [/ˈχoχ.ma/]; חָכְמָה, ḥoḵmā, 'wisdom'), said to precede the rest of Creation, is interpreted etymologically by Kabbalists as the phrase "koach mah" (כֹּחַ מָה, kōaḥ mā, 'power of what')? Alternative listings of the sephirot begin either with keter (כֶּתֶר, keter, 'crown')—representing unconscious will or volition—or chokhmah, reflecting a philosophical duality between rational and supra-rational creation. This duality extends to questions of whether the mitzvot have discernible reasons or transcend human reasoning vis-à-vis God's will (רָצוֹן, raṣôn), whether study or good deeds hold greater value, and whether the symbols of Kabbalah should be understood primarily as metaphysical cognition or as axiological values.

Messianic redemption, in this framework, requires both ethical action—tikkun olam (תִּיקּוּן עוֹלָם, tiqqûn ʿôlām, 'repair [of the] world')—and contemplative intention (i.e., kavanah). Sanford Drob argues that any attempt to reduce Kabbalah to a fixed dogmatic system inevitably produces its own deconstruction. For example, Lurianic Kabbalah incorporates the principle of shevirah; the Ein Sof transcends all of its expressions; and the mystical Torah, represented by the Tree of Life (עֵץ חַיִּים, ʿēṣ ḥayyîm, 'tree of life'), is understood as possessing infinite interpretations. In this way, the infinite unity of the Ein Sof expressed through the multiplicity of the sephirot overcomes the dangers of nihilism or antinomian mystical rejection of Halakha, themes that recur throughout Kabbalistic and Hasidic traditions.

== Primary texts ==
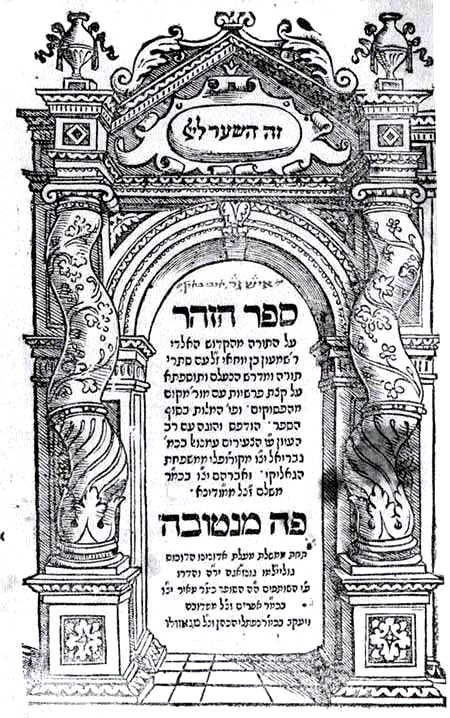
Title page of first printed edition of the Zohar, main sourcebook of Kabbalah, from Mantua, Italy in 1558

Like the rest of the Rabbinic literature, the texts of Kabbalah were once part of an ongoing oral tradition, though over the centuries much of it has been written down.

Scholars have identified evidence of Jewish esoteric traditions dating to the second century BCE, although the nature and scope of these traditions remain subjects of scholarly debate. The book of Sirach, traditionally attributed to Ben Sira (b. c. 170 BCE), contains a warning against pursuing knowledge beyond human understanding:

^{22}Do not concern yourself with matters that are beyond your ability, and do not investigate things that are too difficult for you. ^{23}Reflect on what has been entrusted to you, for you have no need to pry into hidden things. ^{24}Do not wear yourself out chasing what lies beyond your understanding, for more has already been revealed to you than the human mind can fully grasp.

Similar limitations on inquiry into hidden matters appear in the later Rabbinic literature. The Amoraim (Jewish Babylonian Aramaic: אָמוֹרָאִים, romanized: ʾĂmôrāʾîm, lit. 'speakers' or 'interpreters'), whose teachings and debates were compiled in the Gemara of the Talmud, cite Ben Sira in discussions concerning the boundaries of permitted speculation. Tractate Chagigah 13a:2 narrates:

The Gemara comments: Until here, you have permission to speak; from this point forward you do not have permission to speak, as it is written in the book of Ben Sira: Seek not things concealed from you, nor search those hidden from you. Reflect on that which is permitted to you; you have no business with secret matters.

Nonetheless, mystical studies were conducted, resulting in the development of mystical literature. The earliest of these is the apocalyptic literature from the first and second centuries BCE, which incorporated elements that later became part of Kabbalah. Throughout the centuries since, many texts have been produced, among them Sefer Yetzirah, the Hekhalot literature, the Bahir, Sefer Raziel HaMalakh, and the Zohar, the foundational text of Kabbalistic exegesis. Classical mystical Bible commentaries are included in fuller versions of the Mikraot Gedolot (Main Commentators). Cordoveran systemisation is presented in Pardes Rimonim; philosophical articulation in the works of the Maharal; and Lurianic rectification in Etz Chayim. Subsequent interpretations of Lurianic Kabbalah were developed in the writings of Shalom Sharabi, including in Nefesh HaChaim and the 20th-century Sulam. Hasidism interpreted Kabbalistic structures in their correspondence to inward perception. The Hasidic development of Kabbalah incorporates a successive stage of Jewish mysticism from historical Kabbalistic metaphysics.

== Scholarship ==
The first modern academic historians of Judaism, associated with the "Wissenschaft des Judentums" (lit. 'science of Judaism' or 'study of Judaism') movement of the nineteenth century, interpreted Judaism through a rationalist framework shaped by the emancipatory ethos of the Haskalah. Within this approach, they generally minimized the role of Kabbalah and limited its significance in accounts of Jewish historical development. In the mid‑twentieth century, Gershom Scholem challenged this position and helped establish the modern academic study of Jewish mysticism, bringing Hekhalot literature, Kabbalistic writings, and Hasidic texts into the domain of critical historical scholarship. Scholem argued that the mythical and mystical dimensions of Judaism were at least as significant as its rational and legal components, contending that these currents—rather than exoteric Halakha or Jewish philosophical traditions—constituted a persistent force that periodically resurfaced to shape Jewish religious expression and communal life. His Major Trends in Jewish Mysticism (1941), along with his subsequent studies, remains a widely cited historical survey of the principal phases of Jewish mysticism.

Although the study has sometimes been subject to criticism for its various particularities, and proposals of a hermeneutical revision of the text have been introduced, the encompassing sweep and depth of historical analysis in Scholem's Major Trends in Jewish Mysticism remains without equal despite voluminous clarifying scholarship on the subject produced in the meantime, expanding and deepening the terrain.

The Hebrew University of Jerusalem has been a centre of this research, including by Scholem and Isaiah Tishby; more recently, Hebrew University scholars on the subject have includedq Joseph Dan, Yehuda Liebes, Rachel Elior, and Moshe Idel. Scholars across the eras of Jewish mysticism in America and Britain have included Rabbi Alexander Altmann, Rabbi Arthur Green, Lawrence Fine, Elliot Wolfson, Daniel C. Matt, Rabbi Louis Jacobs and Ada Rapoport-Albert.

Moshe Idel has studied Ecstatic Kabbalah alongside the Theosophical tradition, and has called for new multi-disciplinary approaches, beyond the predominant philological and historical approaches, to include phenomenology, psychology, anthropology and comparative studies.

=== Claims for authority ===
Scholem provides a map of how authority is determined within the tradition in the document Revelation & Tradition as Religious Categories, first sent as the postscript to a letter from Jerusalem to Berlin in the early hours of 1933. The letter is addressed to Walter Benjamin. This postscript was published with minimal alterations as a chapter in Scholem's anthology of miscellaneous, longer articles, some forty years later. The document resists summary encapsulation but, taken according to its own terms (and especially considering the context of its composition), it can scarcely be argued with even by rigorous atheists outside the tradition. This explanation is intended for the modern reader, ensconced in a secular world (in point of fact, it is literally intended for the reader Walter Benjamin).

A version of the above-mentioned diagram of the attainment of authority within the tradition appears in a more open and less precise form in the first lecture of Major Trends in Jewish Mysticism. In the later On the Kabbalah and Its Symbolism, Scholem explains that the Kabbalists themselves expressively describe the nomination of authority as proceeding from conversations with the Hebrew prophet Elijah. Scholem writes:

Since the beginnings of Rabbinical Judaism the Prophet Elijah has been a figure profoundly identified with the central preoccupations of Jewry: it is he who carries the divine message from generation to generation, he who at the end of time will reconcile all the conflicting opinions, traditions, and doctrines manifested in Judaism. Men of true piety meet him in the [marketplace] no less than in visions. Since he was conceived as the vigilant custodian of the Jewish religious ideal, the Messianic guardian and guarantor of the tradition, it was impossible to suppose that he would ever reveal or communicate anything that was in fundamental contradiction with the tradition. Thus by its very nature the interpretation of mystical experience as a revelation of the Prophet Elijah tended far more to confirm than to question the traditional authority [of the Torah and its acknowledged library of commentaries].

==== Methods of Calling Upon Authority ====
The entire frame and character of composition in early Kabbalah, prior to the later Lurianic Kabbalah of Safed, appeals to an argument of authority grounded in the antiquity of authority, by speaking in ancient voices and mimicking ancient texts from a contemporary present in the high and late Middle Ages. As a result, the foundational works in the foundational phase of Kabbalah as a literature, from the Bahir to the Zohar, pseudohistorically claim (or are ascribed) ancient authorship. Supposedly ancient mystical works include, for example, Sefer Raziel HaMalakh (סֵפֶר רָזִיאֵל הַמַּלְאָךְ, Sēfer Rāzîʾēl Hammalʾāḵ, 'book [of] Raziel the Angel'), an astro-magical text partly based on a magical manual of late antiquity, and Sefer HaRazim (סֵפֶר הָרָזִים, Sēfer Hārāzîm, 'book [of] the Secrets'), which was—according to the early Kabbalists—transmitted by the angel Raziel (רָזִיאֵל, Rāzîʾēl, 'God's secret') to Adam after he was evicted from Eden. Another famous work, the early Sefer Yetzirah, is pseudohistorically dated back to the era of the biblical patriarch Abraham. Most of the earliest extant manuscripts of the Sefer Yetzirah do not internally claim authorship by Abraham, but this attribution grows up as a tradition or rumor following the text. This tendency toward pseudepigraphy has its roots in apocalyptic literature, which claims that esoteric knowledge such as magic, divination, and astrology was transmitted to humans in the mythic past by two angels, Aza and Azazel, who fell from heaven (Genesis 6:4). This tendency relates to a phase so early that it can scarcely be called Kabbalah, according to the trend in historiography, but relates to the twin traditions referred to as the Maaseh Breishit (מַעֲשֶׂה בְּרֵאשִׁית, 'Work of Creation') and Maaseh Merkavah (מַעֲשֶׂה מֶרְכָּבָה, 'Work of Creation'). The book of Enoch (in which conversations between angels and an antediluvian patriarch are recorded), for example, may be almost as old as our extant version of the book of Daniel if ascriptions of the Aramaic Fragment of Enoch are found to be reliable.

As well as ascribing ancient origins to texts, and reception of Oral Torah transmission, the greatest and most innovative Kabbalists claimed mystical reception of direct personal divine revelations, by heavenly mentors, such as Elijah, the souls of the Tannaim, the Holy Spirit, and others. On this basis Arthur Green speculates, that while the Zohar was written by a circle of Kabbalists in medieval Spain, they may have believed they were channeling the souls and direct revelations from the earlier mystical circle of Shimon bar Yochai in 2nd-century Galilee depicted in the Zohar's narrative. Academics have compared the Zohar mystic circle of Spain with the romanticised wandering circle of Galilee described in the text. Similarly, Isaac Luria gathered his disciples at the traditional idra (Jewish Babylonian Aramaic: אִדְרָא, romanized: iḏrā, lit. 'threshing floor') assembly location, placing each in the seat of their former reincarnations as students of Shimon bar Yochai.

== Criticism ==
=== Distinction between Jews and non-Jews ===
One point of view regarding the relationship between Jews and non-Jews is represented by the Tanya (1797), venerated by Chabad Ḥasidic Jews, which argues that Jews have a purer character of soul: while a non-Jew, according to its author Shneur Zalman of Liadi (1745–1812), can achieve a high level of spirituality, similar to an angel, their soul is still fundamentally different in character from a Jewish one. A similar view is found in Kuzari, an early-medieval philosophical book by Judah Halevi (1075–1141). Elliot R. Wolfson provides numerous sources from the 17th to 20th centuries to challenge the Jewish supremacist view of non-Jews still held—he argues—by adherents of Kabbalah. He argues that, while it is accurate to say that many Jews do and would find Kabbalah's exclusivist views of non-Jews offensive, it is inaccurate to say that the idea has been totally rejected in all circles. As Wolfson has argued, it is an ethical demand on the part of scholars to continue to be vigilant about this matter, and in this way the tradition can be refined from within. Rabbi Abraham Yehudah Khein (1878–1957) believed that spiritually elevated non-Jews essentially have Jewish souls but "lack the formal conversion to Judaism," and that unspiritual Jews are "Jewish merely by their birth documents."

David Halperin argues that the collapse of Kabbalah's influence among Western European Jews over the course of the 17th and 18th centuries was a result of the cognitive dissonance they experienced between the negative perception of non-Jews found in some exponents of Kabbalah and their own positive dealings with non-Jews, which were rapidly expanding and improving during this period due to the influence of the Haskalah. Pinchas Elijah Hurwitz, a Lithuanian-Galician Kabbalist of the 18th century and a moderate proponent of the Haskalah, called for kinship and solidarity between all nations and believed that Kabbalah could empower Jews and non-Jews alike with prophetic abilities.

The works of Abraham Cohen de Herrera (1570–1635) are full of references to non-Jewish mystical philosophers. Such an approach was particularly common among Renaissance and post-Renaissance Italian Jews. Late medieval and Renaissance Italian Kabbalists, such as Yohanan Alemanno, David Messer Leon and Abraham Yagel, adhered to humanistic ideals and incorporated teachings of various Christian and pagan mystics.

A prime representative of this humanist stream in Kabbalah was Elijah Benamozegh, who explicitly praised Christianity, Islam, Zoroastrianism, Hinduism, and a wide range of ancient pagan mystical systems. He believed that Kabbalah could reconcile differences between the world's religions, which, in his thought, represent different facets and stages of universal human spirituality. In his writings, Benamozegh interpreted the Christian New Testament, Muslim Hadith, Hindu Vedas, Zoroastrian Avesta, and pagan mysteries according to Kabbalistic theosophy.

=== Medieval views ===
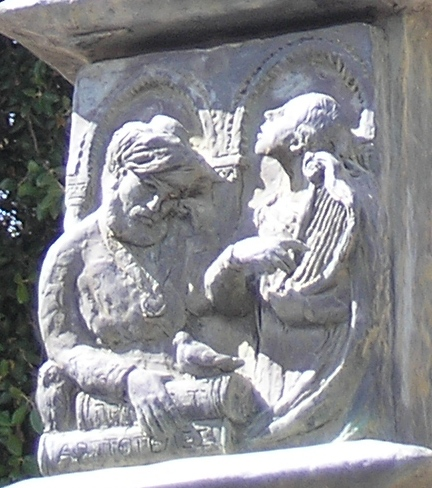
Golden age of Spanish Judaism on the Knesset Menorah, Maimonides holding Aristotle's work

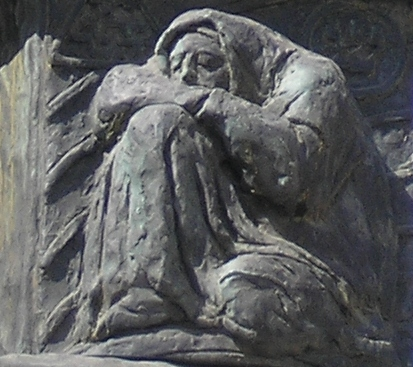
Kabbalah mysticism on the Knesset Menorah, which shared some similarities of theory with Jewish Neoplatonists

In the medieval period, the doctrine of the ten sephirot drew criticism from rationalist Jewish thinkers who emphasized divine simplicity. Influenced by Maimonides's Guide for the Perplexed (מוֹרֶה נְבוּכִים, Mōreh Nevūkhîm), they argued that describing the Godhead through ten hypostatic emanations risked suggesting "God is One being, yet within that One being there are Ten," a formulation that resembled Christian trinitarian theology and threatened the principle of achdut HaShem ([ˈaχdut haˈʃem]; אַחְדוּת הַשֵּׁם, ’Aḥdût ha‑Šēm, lit. 'unity of the Name' or 'divine unity'). Kabbalists defended their system by insisting that the sephirot were not independent beings but attributes or channels of the Ein Sof, unified in their source despite their multiplicity. Moses de León in the Zohar and Moses ben Jacob Cordovero in chapter 3 of Pardes Rimonim portrayed the sephirot as harmonized forces whose apparent plurality ultimately resolved into divine unity.

Maimonides, celebrated by followers for his Jewish rationalism, rejected much of the pre-Kabbalistic Hekhalot literature, particularly Shi'ur Qomah (שִׁעוּר קוֹמָה, 'Measure [of the] Stature'), whose starkly anthropomorphic vision of God he considered heretical. Maimonides lived at the time of the emergence of Kabbalah. Modern scholarship views the systemization and publication of the historical oral doctrine by Kabbalists as a move to rebut the threat to normative Judaism posed by laypeople's misreading of Maimonides's ideal of philosophical contemplation over ritual performance in his philosophical Guide for the Perplexed. They objected to Maimonides's equating the Talmudic Maaseh Breishit and Maaseh Merkavah philosophy of covert meanings in the Torah with Aristotelian physics and metaphysics in the Guide and in his Mishneh Torah, arguing that their own theosophy, which was centered on an esoteric metaphysics of traditional Jewish practice, represented the Torah's true inner meaning.

The thought of Kabbalist and medieval rabbinic sage Nachmanides (13th century), an opponent of Maimonidean rationalism, provided background to many Kabbalistic ideas. The book Gevuras Aryeh, authored by Yaakov Yehuda Aryeh Leib Frenkel and originally published in 1915, sought to explain and elaborate on the Kabbalistic concepts addressed by Nachmanides in his commentary on the Torah.

Abraham Maimonides, in the spirit of his father Moses, Saadiah Gaon, and other predecessors, explains at length in his Milḥamot HaShem (מִלְחֲמוֹת ה׳, 'Wars [of] the Name') that God is in no way literally within time or space nor physically outside time or space, since time and space simply do not apply to his being whatsoever, emphasizing an absolute oneness of divine transcendence. Kabbalah's panentheism, expressed by Rabbi Moses ben Jacob Cordovero and Hasidic thought, agrees that God's essence transcends all expression, but holds in contrast that existence is a manifestation of God's Being, descending immanently through spiritual and physical condensations of the divine light. By incorporating the pluralist many within God, God's oneness is deepened to exclude the true existence of anything but God. In Hasidic panentheism, the world is acosmic from God's view, yet real from its own perspective.

Around the 1230s, Rabbi Meir ben Simon of Narbonne wrote an epistle—included in his Milḥemet Mitzvah (מִלְחֶמֶת מִצְוָה, 'War [of] Commandment')—against his contemporaries (i.e., the early Kabbalists), characterizing them as blasphemers who approach heresy. He particularly singled out the Sefer Bahir, rejecting the attribution of its authorship to the tanna Rabbi Nehunya ben HaKanah and describing some of its content as truly heretical.

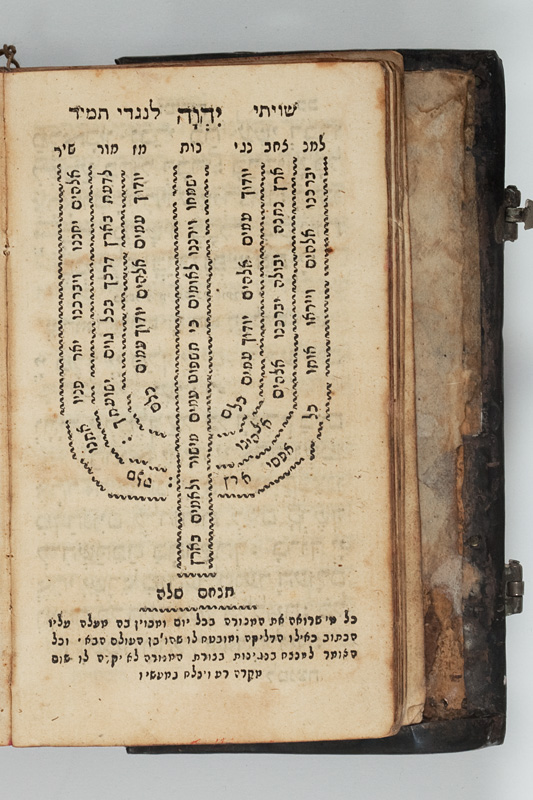
Kabbalistic prayer book from Italy, 1803. Jewish Museum of Switzerland, Basel

Leon of Modena, a 17th-century Venetian critic of Kabbalah, wrote that if Jews were to accept Kabbalah's truth claims, the Christian Trinity would be compatible with Judaism, as the Trinity seems to resemble the Kabbalistic doctrine of the sephirot. This was in response to the belief that some European Jews of the period addressed individual sephirot in their prayers, although the practice was apparently uncommon. Apologists explained that Jews may have been praying for and not necessarily to the aspects of Godliness represented by the sephirot. In contrast to Christianity, Kabbalists declare that one prays only "to Him (God's Essence), (Note: Male solely by metaphor in Hebrew's gendered grammar.) not to his attributes." (Note: Sephirot or any other Divine manifestations or forms of incarnation.) Kabbalists directed their prayers to God's essence through the channels of particular sephirot using kavanot (כַּוָּנוֹת, 'intentions'; sing., kavanah, כָּוָּננָה) and divine names. To pray to a manifestation of God introduces false division among the sephirot, disrupting their absolute unity and dependence, and dissolving into the transcendent Ein Sof; the sephirot descend throughout Creation, only appearing from man's perception of God, where God manifests by any variety of numbers.

Rabbi Yaakov Emden (1697–1776), himself an Orthodox Kabbalist who venerated the Zohar, sought to battle Sabbatean misuse of Kabbalah and wrote the Mitpaḥat Sefarim (מִטְפַּחַת סְפָרִים, 'Veil of the Books'), an astute critique of the Zohar, in which he concludes that certain parts of the Zohar contain heretical teaching and therefore could not have been written by Shimon bar Yochai. The Vilna Gaon (1720–1797) regarded the Zohar and the teachings of Isaac Luria with deep respect. He applied his scholarly acumen to emend classical Jewish texts, aiming to correct what he considered historically accumulated errors, and emphasized the unity of Kabbalistic revelation with Rabbinic Judaism. However, aligned with Lurianic Kabbalah, his commentaries at times preferred Zoharic interpretations when he judged them more accessible or exoteric. In addition to his religious scholarship, he was proficient in mathematics and the sciences, which he recommended as essential tools for understanding the Talmud. However, he rejected the value of canonical medieval Jewish philosophy, asserting that Maimonides had been misled by philosophy in denying belief in external elements of Practical Kabbalah, such as demons, incantations, and amulets.

Views among Kabbalists regarding Jewish philosophy varied. Some appreciated the works of Maimonides and other titans of medieval philosophy, integrating them with Kabbalah and considering human philosophical inquiry and divine mystical wisdom to be compatible. Others adopted a more polemical stance, particularly during periods when philosophy was perceived as overly rationalist or dogmatic. A dictum often cited by Kabbalists, "Kabbalah begins where philosophy ends," has been interpreted both as an expression of appreciation and as a critique. Moses of Burgos (late 13th century) remarked that "these philosophers whose wisdom you are praising end where we begin."

Moses ben Jacob Cordovero valued the influence of Maimonides in his systematic approach, though he emphasized that Kabbalistic symbols, once understood, should not be taken literally to avoid anthropomorphic misconceptions. From its earliest stages, Theosophical Kabbalah incorporated terminology adapted from philosophy and reinterpreted with mystical meanings. This included integration with the Neoplatonism of Solomon ibn Gabirol and the use of Aristotelian concepts such as Form and Matter.

=== Orthodox Judaism ===
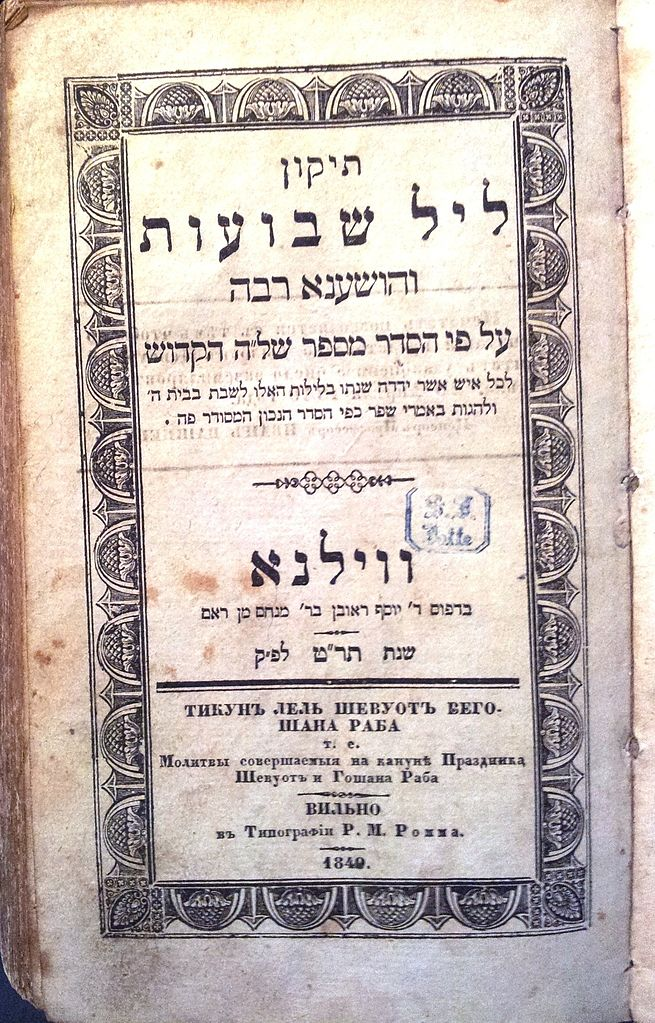
Tikkun for reading through the night of Shavuot, a popular Jewish custom from the Safed Kabbalists

Rabbis and philosophers Pinchas Giller and Adin Steinsaltz explain that Kabbalah is best understood as the inner core of traditional Judaism and its official metaphysics, which was essential to normative Judaism until quite recently. With the decline of Jewish life in medieval Spain, it displaced rationalist Jewish philosophy until the Haskalah, receiving a revival in postmodernity. While Judaism has always maintained a minority tradition of religious rationalist criticism of Kabbalah, Scholem writes that Lurianic Kabbalah was the last theology that was near-predominant in Jewish life. While Lurianism represented the elite of esoteric Kabbalism, its mythical-messianic divine drama and personalisation of reincarnation captured the popular imagination in Jewish folklore and in the Sabbatean and Hasidic movements. Giller notes that the classical Zoharic Kabbalah of Rabbi Moses ben Jacob Cordovero represented a common exoteric popular view of Kabbalah, as depicted in early-modern Musar literature.

In contemporary Orthodox Judaism, there is a dispute over the status of the Zohar and the Kabbalistic teachings of Isaac Luria. While a portion of Modern Orthodox Jews, followers of the Dor De'ah (דּוֹר דֵּעָה, Dôr Dēʿāh, 'Generation [of] Knowledge') movement—and many students of Maimonides reject Lurianic Kabbalistic teachings and deny that the Zohar is authoritative or from Shimon bar Yohai—all three of these groups accept the existence and validity of the Talmudic Maaseh Breishit and Maaseh Merkavah mysticism. Their disagreement concerns whether the Kabbalistic teachings promulgated today accurately represent the esoteric teachings to which the Talmud refers. The mainstream Haredi (Hasidic, Lithuanian, and Sephardic Haredim) and Religious-Zionist Jewish movements revere Luria and Kabbalah, but one can find both rabbis who sympathize with such a view (while disagreeing with it), as well as rabbis who consider such a view heresy. The Haredi Eliyahu Dessler and Gedaliah Nadel maintained that it is acceptable to believe that the Zohar was not written by Shimon bar Yochai and that it had a late authorship. Yechiel Yaakov Weinberg mentioned the possibility of Christian influence in the Kabbalah with the "Kabbalistic vision of the Messiah as the redeemer of all mankind" being "the Jewish counterpart to [the] Christ."

Modern Orthodox Judaism, representing an inclination toward rationalism, the embrace of academic scholarship, and the individual's autonomy to define Judaism, embodies a diversity of views on Kabbalah, ranging from neo-Hasidic spirituality to Maimonidean anti-Kabbalism. Torah im Derech Eretz (תּוֹרָה עִם דֶּרֶךְ אֶרֶץ, Tôrāh ʿim Dereḵ ʾEreṣ, 'Torah with [the] Way [of the] World'), the movement pioneered by Rabbi Samson Raphael Hirsch, also proposed more nuanced views on Kabbalah, arguably stressing its ethical, rather than external-theurgic dimension. Rabbi Hirsch did, however, utilise the Zohar in his monumental legal work Horeb. In a book written to help define central theological issues in Modern Orthodoxy, Michael J. Harris writes that the relationship between Modern Orthodoxy and mysticism has been under-discussed. He sees a deficiency of spirituality in Modern Orthodoxy, as well as the dangers in a fundamentalist adoption of Kabbalah. He suggests the development of neo-Kabbalistic adaptations of Jewish mysticism compatible with rationalism, offering a variety of precedent models from past thinkers ranging from the mystical inclusivism of Abraham Isaac Kook to a compartmentalisation between Halakha and mysticism.

Rabbi Yiḥyah Qafiḥ, a 20th-century Yemenite Jewish leader and chief rabbi of Yemen, spearheaded the Dor De'ah movement to counteract the influence of the Zohar and modern Kabbalah. He authored critiques of mysticism in general and Lurianic Kabbalah in particular; his magnum opus was Milhamot HaShem (lit. 'Wars of HaShem'), written to oppose what he perceived as influences from gnosticism and Neoplatonism on normative Judaism beginning in the 13th century with the publication and distribution of the Zohar. Qafiḥ founded yeshivot (יְשִׁיבוֹת, yĕšîbôt; sing., יְשִׁיבָה, yĕšîbāh, 'meeting [of study]'), rabbinical schools, and synagogues that featured a rationalist approach to Judaism based on the Talmud and works of Saadia Gaon and Maimonides. In recent years, rationalists holding similar views as those of the Dor De'ah movement have described themselves as "talmide ha-Rambam" (תַּלְמִידֵי הָרַמְבַּ”ם, 'students [of] the Rambam') rather than as being aligned with Dor De'ah, and are more theologically aligned with the rationalism of Modern Orthodox Judaism than with Hasidic and Haredi communities.

Yeshayahu Leibowitz (1903–1994), an ultra-rationalist Modern Orthodox philosopher, referred to Kabbalah as "a collection of "pagan superstitions" and "idol worship" in remarks given in 1990.

=== Conservative, Reform and Reconstructionist Judaism ===
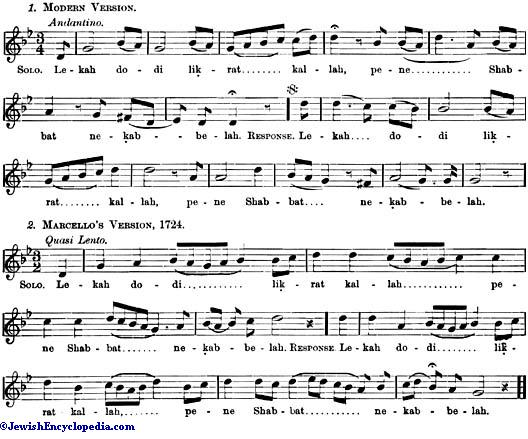
A version of Lekhah Dodi song to welcome the Shabbat, a cross-denominational Jewish custom from Kabbalah

Kabbalah tended to be rejected by the founders of the Conservative and Reform movements, though its influences were not eliminated. While it was generally not studied as a discipline, the Kabbalat Shabbat (קַבָּלַת שַׁבָּת, Qabbālat Shabbat, 'reception of Shabbat') service prayed on Friday evenings—when Shabbat begins—remained part of the liturgy, as did the commonly sung prayer Yedid Nefesh (יְדִיד נֶפֶשׁ, 'beloved of the soul'). Nevertheless, in the 1960s, Saul Lieberman of the Jewish Theological Seminary of America is reputed to have introduced a lecture by Scholem on Kabbalah with a statement that Kabbalah itself was "nonsense", but the academic study of Kabbalah was "scholarship". This view became popular among many Jews, who viewed the subject as worthy of study, but who did not accept Kabbalah as teaching literal truth.

According to Rabbi Bradley Shavit Artson, the dean of the Conservative Ziegler School of Rabbinic Studies in California:

Many Western Jews insisted that their future and their freedom required shedding what they perceived as parochial orientalism. They fashioned a Judaism that was decorous and strictly rational (according to 19th-century European standards), denigrating Kabbalah as backward, superstitious, and marginal.

However, since the late 20th century, there has been a revival of interest in Kabbalah across all non-Orthodox branches of Judaism. The Kabbalistic 12th-century prayer Anim Zemirot (אַנְעִים זְמִירוֹת, ’An‘īm Zemīrōt, 'I shall sing melodies') was restored to the Conservative Sim Shalom and later Lev Shalem siddurim (סִדּוּרִים, siddūrīm, 'orders [of prayer]'; sing., סִדּוּר, siddūr) for Shabbat and ḥaġim (lit. 'festivals'), as was the B'rikh Shmeh (בְּרִיךְ שְׁמֵהּ, Bərīkh Shmeh, 'Blessed is the Name') passage from the Zohar (Note: בְּרִיךְ שְׁמֵהּ דְּמָרֵא עָלְמָא בְּרִיךְ כִּתְרָךְ וְאַתְרָךְ. יְהֵא רְעוּתָךְ עִם עַמָּךְ יִשְׂרָאֵל לְעָלָם. וּפֻרְקַן יְמִינָךְ אַחֲזֵי לְעַמָּךְ בְּבֵית מַקְדְּשָׁךְ וּלְאַמְטוּיֵי לָנָא מִטּוּב נְהוֹרָךְ וּלְקַבֵּל צְלוֹתָנָא בְּרַחֲמִין. יְהֵא רַעֲוָא קֳדָמָךְ דְּתוֹרִיךְ לָן חַיִּין בְּטִיבוּתָא וְלֶהֱוֵי אֲנָא פְקִידָא בְּגוֹ צַדִּיקַיָּא לְמִרְחַם עָלַי וּלְמִנְטַר יָתִי וְיַת כָּל דִּי לִי וְדִי לְעַמָּךְ יִשְׂרָאֵל. Blessed is the Name of the Master of the Universe. Blessed is Your crown and Your place. May Your good will be with Your people Israel forever. Show Your people the redemption of Your right hand in Your Holy Temple. Bestow upon us the goodness of Your light, and accept our prayer with compassion. May it be Your will to prolong our lives in goodness. Let me be counted among the righteous, so that You will have mercy on me and guard me, all that is mine, and all that belongs to Your people Israel. — Zohar § Parashat Vayakhel 2:206a–b) and the mystical Ushpizin (אוּשְׁפִּיזִין, ’Ūshpīzīn, 'guests') service recited to welcome the spirits of Abraham, Isaac, Jacob, Moses, Aaron, Joseph, or David into one's sukkah (סֻכָּה, sukkāh, 'booth') during the festival of Sukkot (סֻכּוֹת, Sukkōt, 'booths'). Anim Zemirot and the 16th-century mystical poem Lekha Dodi (לְכָה דוֹדִי, Ləḵā Dōdī, 'Come, My Beloved') reappeared in the Reform siddur Gates of Prayer in 1975.

All rabbinical seminaries now include courses on Kabbalah in their curricula: in Conservative Judaism, both the Jewish Theological Seminary of America and the Ziegler School of Rabbinic Studies of the American Jewish University in Los Angeles, have full-time instructors in Kabbalah and Hasidic philosophy (חֲסִידוּת, Ḥasidūt). In Reform Judaism, scholar of medieval Judaism and mysticism Sharon Koren teaches at the Hebrew Union College-Jewish Institute of Religion as of July 2026, and Reform rabbis such as Herbert Weiner and Lawrence Kushner renewed interest in Kabbalah among Reform Jews. At the Reconstructionist Rabbinical College, the rabbinical school of Reconstructionist Judaism, Joel Hecker is the full-time instructor teaching courses in Kabbalah and Hasidism.

According to Artson:

Ours is an age hungry for meaning, for a sense of belonging, for holiness. In that search, we have returned to the very Kabbalah our predecessors scorned. The stone that the builders rejected has become the head cornerstone (Psalm 118:22)... Kabbalah was the last universal theology adopted by the entire Jewish people, hence faithfulness to our commitment to positive-historical Judaism mandates a reverent receptivity to Kabbalah.

The Reconstructionist movement, under the leadership of Rabbi Arthur Green in the 1980s and 1990s, and with the influence of Renewal Judaism rabbi Zalman Schachter-Shalomi, brought a strong openness to Kabbalah and hasidic elements that then came to play prominent roles in the Kol ha-Neshamah (כָּל הַנְּשָׁמָה, Kol Hanəshāmāh, 'All the soul') siddur series.

=== Antinomian Kabbalah ===
Antinomian strands of Kabbalah reject or invert normal religious principles as a way of attempting purification. In these frameworks, transgression or sin itself is viewed as a spiritual necessity, capable of unleashing hidden divine sparks trapped in impure realms. The most prominent antinomian movements within Judaism were the Sabbateans and the Frankists. Sabbateans were followers of Sabbatai Zevi, a 17th-century Jewish messiah claimant who argued that the messiah rendered both biblical mitzvot and rabbinic Halakha obsolete, with some sects engaging in ritualistic violations of both. Many of his adherents continued to view his actions as part of a hidden divine plan, even after Zevi's apostasy to Islam. In the 18th century, Jacob Frank pushed Sabbatean theology further, advocating explicitly for "redemption through sin," such as ritualized orgies and incest. Eventually, the Frankists were encouraged to convert en masse to Roman Catholicism, and most did so. These movements were widely condemned as heretical but demonstrate the extent to which mystical ideas could support radical or subversive reinterpretations of normative Judaism and Jewish life.

== Contemporary study ==
The teaching of classical, esoteric Kabbalistic texts and practices remained traditional until recent times, passed on in Judaism from master to disciple or studied by leading rabbinic scholars. This changed in the 20th century, through conscious reform and the secular openness of knowledge. In contemporary times, Kabbalah is studied in four very different, though sometimes overlapping, ways.

The traditional Jewish method, used since the 16th century in study circles, requires being born Jewish or converting, then joining a group of Kabbalists under a rabbi—often Hasidic since the 18th century, though others exist among Sephardi-Mizrachi and Lithuanian scholars. Besides elite Kabbalah, Hasidic texts explain Kabbalistic ideas for broad spiritual use, focusing on the psychological perception of panentheism.

A second, new universalist form is the method of modern-style Jewish organisations and writers, who seek to disseminate Kabbalah to individuals regardless of race or class, especially since the rise of Western interest in mysticism in the 1960s. These derive from various cross-denominational Jewish interests in Kabbalah and range from considered theology to popularised forms that often adopt New Age terminology and beliefs for wider communication. These groups highlight or interpret Kabbalah through non-particularist, universalist aspects.

A third way is non-Jewish organisations, mystery schools, initiation bodies, fraternities and secret societies, the most popular of which are Freemasonry, Rosicrucianism and the Hermetic Order of the Golden Dawn, although hundreds of similar societies claim a Kabbalistic lineage. These derive from religious syncretism between Jewish Kabbalah and Christian, occultist, or contemporary New Age spirituality. As a separate spiritual tradition in Western esotericism since the Renaissance, with different aims from its Jewish origin, the non-Jewish traditions differ significantly and do not give an accurate representation of the Jewish spiritual understanding (or vice versa).

Fourthly, since the mid-20th century, historical-critical scholarly investigation of all eras of Jewish mysticism has flourished into an established department of university Jewish studies. While the first academic historians of Judaism in the 19th century opposed and marginalized Kabbalah, Gershom Scholem and his successors repositioned the historiography of Jewish mysticism as a central, vital component of Judaic renewal throughout history. Cross-disciplinary academic revisions of Scholem's and others' theories are regularly published for a wide readership.

=== Universalist Jewish organisations ===
Bnei Baruch (lit. 'blessed children' or 'sons [of] blessing') is a group of Kabbalah students based in Israel. Michael Laitman established Bnei Baruch in 1991, following the passing of Rav Baruch Ashlag, the son of Rabbi Yehuda Ashlag. Laitman named his group Bnei Baruch to commemorate his mentor. The teaching strongly suggests restricting one's studies to 'authentic sources': Kabbalists in the direct lineage from master to disciple.

The Kabbalah Centre was founded in the United States in 1965 as the National Research Institute of Kabbalah by Philip Berg and Rav Yehuda Tzvi Brandwein, a disciple of Yehuda Ashlag. Later, Philip Berg and his wife re-established the organisation as the Kabbalah Centre. The organization's leaders "vehemently reject" Orthodox Jewish identity.

The Kabbalah Society, run by Warren Kenton, is an organization that claims adherence to pre-Lurianic medieval Kabbalah, though presented in a universalist style. In contrast, traditional Kabbalists read earlier Kabbalah through later Lurianism and the systemisations of 16th-century Safed.

The New Kabbalah by Sanford L. Drob is a scholarly investigation of Lurianic symbolism from the perspective of modern and postmodern intellectual thought. It seeks a "new Kabbalah" rooted in the historical tradition through its academic study, but universalised through dialogue with modern philosophy and psychology. This approach seeks to enrich the secular disciplines, while uncovering intellectual insights formerly implicit in Kabbalah's essential myth:

By being equipped with the nonlinear concepts of dialectical, psychoanalytic, and deconstructive thought we can begin to make sense of the Kabbalistic symbols in our own time. So equipped, we are today probably in a better position to understand the philosophical aspects of the Kabbalah than were the Kabbalists themselves.

The Kabbalah of Information is described in the 2018 book From Infinity to Man: The Fundamental Ideas of Kabbalah Within the Framework of Information Theory and Quantum Physics, written by Ukrainian-born physicist and entrepreneur Eduard Shifrin. The main tenet of the book is, "In the beginning He created information", rephrasing the famous saying of Nachmanides, "In the beginning He created primordial matter and He didn't create anything else, just shaped it and formed it."

=== Hasidic ===
Since the 18th century, Jewish mystical development has continued within Hasidic Judaism, turning Kabbalah into a social revival through texts that internalize mystical thought. Among different schools, such as Chabad-Lubavitch and Breslov, along with related organizations, provide outward-looking spiritual resources and textual learning for secular Jews. The intellectual Hasidism of Chabad most emphasises the spread and understanding of Kabbalah through its explanation in Hasidic thought, articulating divine meaning within Kabbalah through rational analogies, aiming to unite the spiritual and material, esoteric and exoteric in their Divine source:

Hasidic thought instructs in the predominance of spiritual form over physical matter, the advantage of matter when it is purified, and the advantage of form when integrated with matter. The two are to be unified so one cannot detect where either begins or ends, for "the Divine beginning is implanted in the end and the end in the beginning" (Sefer Yetzira 1:7). The One God created both for one purpose – to reveal the holy light of His hidden power. Only both united complete the perfection desired by the Creator.

=== Neo-Hasidic ===
Since the early 20th century, neo-Hasidism expressed a modernist or non-Haredi Jewish interest in Jewish mysticism, becoming influential among Modern Orthodox, Conservative, Reform and Reconstructionist Jewish denominations from the 1960s, and organised through the Jewish Renewal and chavurah movements. The writings and teachings of Rabbis Zalman Schachter-Shalomi, Arthur Green, Lawrence Kushner, Herbert Weiner, and others have sought to advance a critically selective, non-fundamentalist, neo-Kabbalistic and Hasidic study of Jewish mysticism among contemporary Jews. The proliferation of scholarship of Jewish mysticism by academia has contributed to critical adaptations of Jewish mysticism. Green's translations of the religious writings of Hillel Zeitlin present the latter as a precursor to contemporary neo-Hasidism. Reform rabbi Herbert Weiner's Nine and a Half Mystics (1969), a travelogue among Kabbalists and Hasidim, brought perceptive insights into Jewish mysticism to many Reform Jews. Leading Reform philosopher Eugene Borowitz described the Orthodox Hasidic Adin Steinsaltz (The Thirteen Petalled Rose) and Aryeh Kaplan as major presenters of Kabbalistic spirituality for contemporary Jews.

=== Rav Kook ===
The writings of Rav Abraham Isaac Kook (1864–1935), the first chief rabbi of Mandate Palestine, incorporate Kabbalistic themes through his own poetic language and concern with human and divine unity. His influence is in the Religious Zionist community, which aims to infuse its philosophy into Israeli secular society:

Due to the alienation from the "secret of God" [i.e. Kabbalah], the higher qualities of the depths of Godly life are reduced to trivia that do not penetrate the depth of the soul. When this happens, the most mighty force is missing from the soul of nation and individual, and Exile finds favor essentially... We should not negate any conception based on rectitude and awe of Heaven of any form—only the aspect of such an approach that desires to negate the mysteries and their great influence on the spirit of the nation. This is a tragedy that we must combat with counsel and understanding, with holiness and courage.

== Cathar and Mandaean parallels ==
In his historical study of Kabbalah, Gershom Scholem explores the evidence of interaction between medieval Kabbalists of Provence and the Cathars, a Gnostic Christian group prevalent in the region when the earliest medieval Kabbalah texts were composed. In Jewish Influence on Christian Reform Movements, Louis Israel Newman concluded, "Point by point, parallels can be found between Catharist views and the Kabbalah, and it may well be that at times there was an exchange of opinions between Jewish and Gentile mystics." Earlier in the same book, Newman observed:

…that the powerful Jewish culture in Languedoc, which had acquired sufficient strength to assume an aggressive, propagandist policy, created a milieu wherefrom movements of religious independence arose readily and spontaneously. Contact and association between Christian princes and their Jewish officials and friends stimulated the state of mind which facilitated the banishment of orthodoxy, the clearing away of the debris of Catholic theology. Unwilling to receive Jewish thought, the princes and laity turned towards Catharism, then being preached in their domains.

Nathaniel Deutsch writes:

Initially, these interactions [between Mandaeans and Jewish mystics in Babylonia from Late Antiquity to the medieval period] resulted in shared magical and angelological traditions. During this phase the parallels which exist between Mandaeism and Hekhalot mysticism would have developed. At some point, both Mandaeans and Jews living in Babylonia began to develop similar cosmogonic and theosophic traditions involving an analogous set of terms, concepts, and images. At present it is impossible to say whether these parallels resulted primarily from Jewish influence on Mandaeans, Mandaean influence on Jews, or from cross-fertilization. Whatever their original source, these traditions eventually made their way into the priestly—that is, esoteric—Mandaean texts ... and into the Kabbalah.

R.J. Zwi Werblowsky suggests Mandaeism has more commonality with Kabbalah than with Merkabah mysticism, such as cosmogony and sexual imagery. The Thousand and Twelve Questions, Scroll of Exalted Kingship, and Alma Rišaia Rba associate the alphabet with the creation of the world, a concept found in Sefer Yetzirah and the Bahir.

Mandaean names for uthras (angels or guardians) have been found in Jewish magical texts. Abatur appears to be inscribed inside a Jewish incantation bowl in a variant form, Abiṭur. Pāṯaḥil (Jewish Babylonian Aramaic: פתחיאל), apparently a variant of Ptahil in Mandaeism, is found in the Sefer HaRazim, listed among other angels who stand on the ninth step of the second firmament.

== See also ==
- List of Jewish Kabbalists
- Aggadah – Non-legalistic exegetical texts in the classical rabbinic literature
- Ayin and Yesh – "Nothingness" in Kabbalah and Hasidic philosophy
- English Qaballa – English Qaballa system of James Lees
- Gnosticism – Early Christian and Jewish religious systems
- Ka-Bala – Talking 1967 board game
- Notarikon – Kabbalistic method of deriving a word
- Temurah – Method in Kabbalah
