= Z'ev ben Shimon Halevi =

British Kabbalist and author (1933–2020)

- Born: Warren Derek Kenton; 8 January 1933; London, UK
- Died: 21 September 2020 (aged 87); London, UK
- Other names: Z'ev ben Shimon ben Joshua Haham-Halevi
- Education: Saint Martin's School of Art; Royal Academy of Arts
- Occupations: Writer; teacher
- Organisation: Kabbalah Society
- Spouse: Rebekah Kenton

Z'ev ben Shimon Halevi (born Warren Kenton; 8 January 1933 – 21 September 2020) was a British writer and teacher of Kabbalah, and a founding member of the Kabbalah Society. Halevi largely published under his Hebrew name, Z'ev ben Shimon Halevi, a contraction of his full family name of Z'ev ben Shimon ben Joshua Haham-Halevi.

== Early life and education ==
Warren Derek Kenton (Hebrew name: Z'ev ben Shimon Halevi) was born on 8 January 1933 in London to a British Jewish family of Sephardi Levite descent. Both of Halevi's parents were of Levite descent, with his father being descended from a rabbinical Sephardi line with roots in Bessarabia, Russian Empire (present-day, Moldova and Ukraine) and his mother being of Polish Ashkenazi descent. Halevi was the great-grandson of Zerah Barnett.

Following the outbreak of Second World War, Halevi's family moved to High Wycombe. Halevi later studied at Saint Martin's School of Art and the Royal Academy of Arts.

== Career ==
After college he kept up his artwork, some of which was commissioned. Further work included working in general and psychiatric hospitals, as well as in a theatre workshop and at the Royal Opera House.

Besides theatre work and practising graphic design , he also taught at RADA and the Architectural Association. He ran workshops for the Wrekin Trust and lectured at the Theosophical Society, the Royal College of Art and the Prince of Wales Institute of Architecture.

=== Kabbalistic work ===
Halevi first began studying Kabbalah at the age of 25 as a self-taught student, believing that he was directed by spiritual helpers. He began teaching in 1969, having placed notes on notice boards in places such as the Architectural Association School of Architecture, where he was a sometime tutor (together with Keith Critchlow), inviting individuals interested in philosophy to contact him (then a Gudjieff tradition tactic employed on the advertising hoardings of the London Underground). He then began a series of weekly group meetings at his flat in Holland Park, believing that he was carrying on an old Dutch Kabbalist tradition known as the Bretheren of the Common Life (which may have been a misunderstanding of a Pietist tradition of the same name in Netherlands in the 14th century). He expressed zero interest in modern philosophy.

Halevi later visited nearly all the old major centres of Kabbalah in Europe, North Africa and Israel, while specialising in the Toledano Tradition, a form that derives from the Sephardi Kabbalah which developed in early medieval Spain and France and which included among its focal points the towns of Lunel, Posquières, Girona and the city of Toledo.

These and other centres flowered, producing among their practitioners of mysticism and Kabbalah Isaac the Blind, Azriel of Gerona, Ezra ben Solomon, and Nachmanides. During this period Kabbalists incorporated into their expositions and exegeses a degree of Neoplatonic emanationism, first introduced into Spain by Solomon ibn Gabirol, that conformed to the requirements of Jewish theology and philosophy. To some extent, in medieval times, it conflicted with the Aristotelian approach to Jewish philosophy by Maimonides and his followers. As defined by the Provencal/Catalan Kabbalists, emanationism was concerned with how the transcendent God, called Ein Sof by Kabbalists, caused potentialities to flow into Existence via what became named as the 10 Sephirot in order to bring about Creation.

A fellow of the Temenos Academy, UK, instituted by the poet, Kathleen Raine, Halevi regularly lectured there. He taught groups on every continent, including at Interface Boston, the New York Open Centre; The Centre for Psychological Astrology, UK; Omega Institute; New York Kabbalah Society; the Jungian Institute of Santa Fe, New Mexico; and Karen Kabbalah, Atlanta, as well as in synagogues and at rabbinical colleges. He was the Director of Tutors for the Kabbalah Society and for many years ran a series of Kabbalah courses at Regent's College in London.

He traveled widely and ran a continuing series of Way of Kabbalah courses and lectures held in many countries, including America, Australia, Brazil, Canada, England, Germany, Holland, Israel, Japan, Mexico, Scotland and Spain, though few of his lectures have been published and fewer still are online; similarly with his articles. Over the years, he also took part in a series of interviews for various media.

Halevi was as well known a writer as he was a teacher of Kabbalah, having published 18 books, including a kabbalistic novel and books on astrology and kabbalistic astrology. Contemporary astrologers such as Judy Hall refer to the work he has done on the latter. In the earlier part of his career he wrote a number of books on stagecraft. Both he and his work on the Toledano Tradition are publicly recognized, and his work has now been translated into sixteen languages, to date, including Hebrew.

He also set up an annual Summer School, aided by his wife, which regularly included students from around the world, and he started up an annual series of workshops in London. At his home, he also held regular weekly meetings, during term time, of the London Kabbalah Group. This part of his work continued for many years.

Halevi was one of the founder members of the Kabbalah Society, which was set up to encourage the study of late C12th and early C13th Kabbalah in Provence and Spain.

== Reception ==
=== Influence ===
King Charles III

In an introduction to the Sacred Web Conference, University of Alberta, Edmonton, Alberta, 23/24 September 2006 at the University of Alberta in 2006, King Charles III, a Patron of the Temenos Academy, said, when talking of the tension between Tradition and Modernism:

This dilemma is captured in ancient notions of balance and harmony; notions that are, for example, expressed in many guises in that wonderful Kabbalistic diagram of the Tree of Life. As the Temenos Fellow, Warren Kenton, so beautifully explains in his lectures to the students of the Academy, the teaching of the Tree of Life is that the "active" and the "passive" aspects of life, which on their own may lead to imbalance and disharmony, must be, can only be, brought together in harmony by the influx into our lives of the Divine and the Sacred. Whether or not we interpret this image as an explanation of an outer or an inner orientation, it is in this way, and only in this way, that the forces, or characteristics, of expansion and constraint can be brought into balance.

There is a DVD that includes this portion of the King's talk on the World Wisdom website.

Kathleen Raine

The poet, Kathleen Raine, had this to say about Halevi's work:

A feature of this author's system not found in others (although doubtless it is traditional though not universally taught) is the beautiful way in which the interfaces of each 'world' overlap with the one above (or below). Thus, the highest experiences of the physical world overlap the lower part of the next world (the psychological]: and again psyche's highest experiences of the individual soul coincide with spiritual regions of the transpersonal world of universal forms. So from illumination to illumination we reascend the 'ladder' by which each of us 'came down to earth from heaven'. The awe-inspiring sublimity of the Kabbalistic universe at once convinces and comforts. It is our destiny to descend and to fulfil some task, learn some lesson in the natural world; as it is to follow the path of return, to reascend from world to world, no matter how many lifetimes this may take us before we return to our true home, 'the kingdom of Heaven'. Kathleen Raine, Light Magazine, Spring 1989.

Sinéad O'Connor

Singer Sinéad O'Connor wrote in the inner sleeve notes to the album, I Do Not Want What I Haven't Got, "Special thanks to Selina Marshall + Warren Kenton for showing me that all I'd need was inside me."

Charles Thomson

Artist Charles Thomson said, "I studied Kabbalah under a teacher called Warren Kenton, who said there was a lot of humour at the spiritual level, and I think that's true."

=== Criticism ===
A professor of Kabbalah at Hebrew University of Jerusalem has bemoaned the hijacking of kabbalah by various New Age authors and gave Halevi as an example. Joseph Dan, in his work The Heart and the Fountain: An Anthology of Jewish Mystical Experiences, wrote in footnote 57 to the introduction:

Another distressing phenomenon is connected with the numerous books concerning kabbalah, its history, nature, and traditions, as instruction for modern living, published by "Z'ev ben Shimon Halevi" who is a nice English gentleman from Hampstead who does not know any Hebrew. His books were used as authentic, scholarly source by many, including Simo Parpola.

== Personal life ==
In June 1987, Halevi married Rebekah Kenton (née Iltaner; English name: Tanja Kenton).

Halevi died on the 21 September 2020 aged 87 in London.

== Bibliography ==
Early books on Stagecraft

- Introducing Stagecraft, (as Warren Kenton), Drake Publishers, c.1971
- Play Begins: A Documentary-Novel upon the Mounting of a Play, (as Warren Kenton), Elek Books. 1971
- Stage Properties and How to Make Them, (as Warren Kenton), Pitman, 1978

Subsequent books on Kabbalah

- An Introduction to the Cabala: Tree of Life, Rider, 1972; Samuel Weiser, 1991
- Adam and the Kabbalistic Tree, Rider, London 1974
- A Kabbalistic Universe, Samuel Weiser, 1977; Gateway, 1988
- Kabbalah: A Tradition of Hidden Knowledge Thames and Hudson, 1979
- Kabbalah and Exodus, Rider, 1980, Samuel Weiser, 1988 and Gateway Books, 1993
- The Work of the Kabbalist, Gateway, 1984; Samuel Weiser, 1993
- The School of the Soul, Gateway Books, 1985
- Psychology and Kabbalah Samuel Weiser, 1986; Gateway, 1991
- The Way of Kabbalah, Gateway Books, 1991
- Kabbalah: The Divine Plan, Harper Collins, 1996
- Introduction to the World of Kabbalah, Kabbalah Society: Tree of Life Publishing (UK), 2008
- The Path of a Kabbalist: An Autobiography, Kabbalah Society: Tree of Life Publishing (UK), 2009
- A Kabbalistic View of History, Kabbalah Society: Tree of Life Publishing (UK), 2013
- Kabbalistic Contemplations, pub. Bet El Trust (UK), 2021

Astrological works

- As Above so Below: A Study in Cosmic Progression, (as Warren Kenton), Stuart and Watkins, 1969
- Astrology: The Celestial Mirror, (as Warren Kenton), Thames and Hudson, 1974
- Astrology and Kabbalah, pub. Urania Trust, 2000: formerly published as The Anatomy of Fate, Gateway Books, 1978

Kabbalistic novel

- The Anointed, Penguin Arcana, 1987.

Audio CDs

- Way of Kabbalah Meditations, Tree of Life Publishing (UK), 2004
