= Kabbalah Society =

London-based Jewish organisation

The Kabbalah Society is a London-based organisation that was founded in the early 1970s to promote what is known as the Toledano Tradition of Kabbalah, initially researched and first taught by Z'ev ben Shimon Halevi. Currently, it is also taught by a number of tutors worldwide to their respective Kabbalah groups.

== Organization ==
The Kabbalah Society encourages serious study into the antecedents of the Toledano Tradition of Kabbalah and of present-day practice. It is supported by the Bet El Trust, set up in 1983, which finances the publications of the society and its principal tutor Z'ev ben Shimon Halevi. Its website is home to a number of articles, and its online bookshop publishes under its own imprint, the Kabbalah Society.

== Aims ==
It organises conferences, often combined with visits abroad to centres of kabbalistic interest, and has a number of tutors and groups worldwide, including, among others, those groups in Australia, Belgium, Brazil, Canada, England, Germany, Japan, Mexico, the Netherlands, Portugal, Scotland, South Africa, Sweden, Spain, and the USA. The teaching of Toledano Kabbalah was led by the Director of Tutors, author, and teacher of Kabbalah, Z'ev ben Shimon Halevi. Since his death in September 2020, the Society continues to disseminate the teachings of the Tradition.

While the 16 books written by Halevi form the contemporary basis of the Toledano Tradition, tutors also pursue their own interests, introducing compatible elements of those into their Group teachings.

Papers given over the years at conferences organised by the Kabbalah Society, of which Halevi was the founder member, remain unpublished, though various tutors and students of the Toledano Tradition have produced books. A number of free articles can be viewed on the website of the Kabbalah Society. Among them, written by various members of the Society, are papers on "The Vision of Ibn Gabriol – The poet-philosopher’s poem ‘Love,'" "The Work of Unification and Devekut in the Writings of Moshe Chaim Luzatto," "The Three Cultures of Spain," "Kabbalah, Time and Evolution" and an "Introduction to Kabbalah" by Halevi.

As well as emphasising the ecumenism that prevailed during Spain's Golden Age, a further aim of the Society is to promote, in modern form, the ideas of those kabbalists of the 10th-12th centuries living and working in Spain and Provence, among them, Isaac the Blind, Azriel of Gerona and Nachmanides:

"This line of Kabbalah follows the Toledano Tradition dating back to medieval Spain where the three branches of the Abrahamic revelation met in a civilised cosmopolitan atmosphere, not unlike our own epoch. Here the Kabbalah brought together an esoteric fusion of religion and philosophy. In our time we relate its ancient theories and practices to contemporary psychology, science, and art."
