= Jewish mystical exegesis =

Jewish mystical exegesis is a method of interpreting the Bible based on the assumption that the Torah contains secret knowledge regarding creation and the manifestations of God. The only way to find these secrets is to know how to decode the text and reveal them. The method most likely dates back to the First Temple Period with expansion in the 3rd century

Focusing on the holiness of the text, Jewish mystics consider every nuance of the text to be a clue in discovering divine secrets, from the entire text to the accents on each letter. Once one can find such knowledge, one can use the text in mystical rituals to affect both the upper worlds (heavens) and the lower world (our world). The name of God is considered one of the greatest sources of power and is assumed to be hidden in various forms throughout the text. Much activity involves rearranging the breaks between words to seek out different names for God as well as other aspects of hidden knowledge.

There are two foundational texts within the realm of Jewish mysticism: the Sefer Yezirah and the kabbalistic Zohar.

== Sefer Yetzirah ==
Sefer Yetzirah (Hebrew, Sēpher Yəṣîrâh "Book of Formation," or "Book of Creation," ספר יצירה) is the title of the earliest extant book on Jewish esotericism. "Yetzirah" is more literally translated as "Formation"; the word "Briah" is used for "Creation".

== Zohar ==
The Zohar was originally considered to be a revelation from God through R. Simeon ben Yohai, though it was most likely written by Moses de Leon of Spain in the 13th century. The text uses large amounts of gematria to interpret the Torah text. The method of gematria involves numeric values assigned to Hebrew letters, giving every word a value, allowing one to look for patterns in the text based on those numerical values. According to the Zohar, gematria is the highest category of interpretation, called "Sod" which refers to mystical interpretation. There is also the literal, allusion-based and anagogical meanings of the text which are referred to as "Peshat", "Remez" and "Derash" respectively. When the 4th category is added, the acrostic forms the four-fold exegetical method called PaRDeS ("Paradise") which can be achieved once one understands the Torah in all four modes of interpretation.

== See also ==
- Pardes (Jewish exegesis)
- Gematria
- Bible code
