= Herbert Weiner =

- Born: October 27, 1919; Boston, Massachusetts, U.S.
- Died: April 22, 2013 (aged 93); Jerusalem, Israel
- Known for: The Wild Goats of Ein Gedi, Nine and a Half Mystics

Herbert Weiner was an ordained American Reform rabbi in South Orange, New Jersey, and the author of The Wild Goats of Ein Gedi and Nine and a Half Mystics. Weiner is credited for introducing Jewish mysticism to many American Jews.

== Activities ==
Herbert Weiner served as the founding rabbi of Temple Israel in South Orange, New Jersey. He also served as the first administrator of Hebrew Union College in Jerusalem.

== Nine and a Half Mystics ==
Herbert Weiner's Nine and a Half Mystics, published in 1969, explores themes on Kabbalah and Jewish mysticism. Weiner also recounts his experiences with Jewish groups who incorporate the mystical tradition in their religious practice.

Weiner formed the book after visiting various Jewish communities in his search for Jewish mysticism. For many American Jews, Weiner's work was their first exposure to the Jewish mystical tradition.

== Impact on Neo-Hasidism ==
Weiner's writings on Jewish mysticism help shape the Neo-Hasidic impulses among some American Jews. Rabbi Arthur Green, a leader in the Jewish Renewal movement and a proponent of Neo-Hasidism in general, was first exposed to Jewish mysticism by reading Weiner's Nine and a Half Mystics.

Weiner also authored a preface to neo-Hasidic guru Reb Zalman Schachter's Fragments of a Future Scroll: Hassidism For the Aquarian Age (Leaves of Grass Press, Germantown, PA: 1975).
