= Nine and a Half Mystics =

- Authors: Herbert Weiner
- Language: English
- Subject: religion, mysticism
- Publisher: Collier Books
- Publication date: 1969

Nine and a Half Mystics: The Kabbala Today is a 1969 book on Jewish mysticism by Rabbi Herbert Weiner. The book includes interviews with a number of Jewish mystics and scholars, as well as the author's encounters with various Jewish groups practicing who incorporate mysticism in their religious practice.

== Nine and a Half Mystics ==
Nine and a Half Mystics explores themes on Kabbalah and Jewish mysticism as well as those Jewish groups where the mystical tradition is active.

Weiner, a Reform rabbi, based the book on his travels to various Jewish communities in his search for Jewish mysticism. For many American Jews, Weiner's work was their first exposure to the Jewish mystical tradition.

== Interviews ==
Nine and a Half Mystics includes a number of interviews with Jewish mystics and scholars including:

- Rabbi Menachem Mendel Schneerson, the Lubavitcher Rebbe
- Dr. Gershom Sholem
- Dr. Martin Buber
- Rabbi Tzvi Yehuda Kook
- Rabbi Adin Steinsaltz
- Rabbi Dovid Cohen, "The Nazir"

== Encounters ==
In addition to interviews, Rabbi Weiner also travelled to various Jewish communities where Jewish mysticism is incorporated in religious practice. Weiner visited the Chabad-Lubavitch movement in Brooklyn, the Breslov community in New York and Israel, among others.

== See also ==
- Kabbalah
