= Anthropos =

Anthropos (ἄνθρωπος) is Greek for human.

Anthropos may also refer to:

- Anthropos, in Gnosticism, the first human being, also referred to as Adamas (from Hebrew meaning earth) or Geradamas
- ′Anthropos′ as a part of an expression in the original Greek New Testament that is translated as Son of man
- Anthropos (journal), a journal published since 1906 by the Anthropos Institute
  - Anthropos phonetic alphabet, a phonetic transcription alphabet developed for the Anthropos journal
- The Archives of Anthropos, a series of fantasy novels for children
- Anthropos (robot), a social robot developed by Media Lab Europe
- Anthropos Pavilion, a museum located in the city of Brno, South Moravia, Czech Republic

== See also ==
- Anthropoid (disambiguation)
- Anthropology
