= Samson ben Joseph of Falaise =

1th century French rabbi

Rabbi Samson ben Yosef the Elder of Falaise (Hebrew: רבי שמשון בן יוסף הזקן מפלייזא, romanized: Rabbi Shimshon ben Yosef Hazaken mi-Palaiza) was one of the Tosafot. His brother-in-law was Rabbeinu Tam (his sister Miriam was married to Rabbeinu Tam), who held him in high esteem.

He is mentioned in Tosafot in several places in the Talmud as someone who expressed an opinion or came up with a novel idea that was included due to its importance.

He was the author of Tosafot on Shabbat (Talmud), Eruvin (Talmud), Yevamot and Hullin.

He also wrote a short pamphlet in which he summarized the laws of Mezuzah. A copy of this was preserved and printed from manuscript.

He was the grandfather of Rabbi Samson ben Abraham of Sens and Isaac ben Abraham of Dampierre He died a martyr's death and his body was only given for burial six months after his death.

== Family tree ==
Rashi family tree

Isaac Hatzarfati
Samuel	Rashi
Meir	Jochebed	Rachel	Eliezer	Miriam	Judah ben Nathan
Samuel ben Meir	Rabbeinu Tam	Miriam	Samson ben Yosef	Rivam	Solomon ben Meir	Miriam	Samuel of Vitry	Yom Tov	Eliezer?
Isaac	Joseph	Solomon	Abraham of Sens	Judah ben Yom Tov	Joseph
Isaac ben Samuel
Isaac of Dampierre	Samson ben Abraham	Isaac
Rabbeinu Elhanan
Rabbi Jacob	Judah ben Isaac Messer Leon
Samuel ben Elhanan
Samuel of Acre

Notes:
- Rashi's daughters

== Rashi's family circle ==
- Rashi
  - Yocheved bat Rashi & Meir ben Samuel
    - Isaac ben Meir (RIvaM)
    - Samuel ben Meir (RaShbaM)
    - Solomon ben Meir
    - Jacob ben Meir (Rabbeinu Tam)
      - Margolioth family
    - Hannah bat Meir & Samuel ben Simhah of Vitry
      - Isaac ben Samuel (RI HaZaken)
        - Elhanan ben Isaac of Dampierre (Rabbeinu Elkhanan)
          - Samuel ben Elhanan Jaffe
            - Jaffe family
  - Miriam bat Rashi & Judah ben Nathan (RIBaN)
    - Yom Tov ben Judah
      - Judah ben Yom Tov
        - Isaac ben Judah
          - Judah ben Isaac Messer Leon
          - daughter of Isaac ben Judah & Yechiel of Paris
            - Moses ben Yechiel
              - Joseph ben Moses
                - Matityahu ben Joseph
                  - Abraham ben Matityahu
                    - Lurie family and Treves family
  - Rachel bat Rashi & Eliezer
