= Rabbanit Channah =

12th century Rabbi's daughter

Hannah bat Meir
- Parents: Meir of Ramerupt (father); Yokheved bat Shlomo Yitzḥaki (mother)

Rabbanit Channah (Hebrew: רבנ' חנה; fl. mid-12th century) was the daughter of R. Meir of Ramerupt, sister of Rashbam, the Rivam, and Rabbenu Tam, and granddaughter of Rashi.

She is known only from MS ex-Montefiore 134, which records that "I heard that Rabbanit Channah, the sister of Rabbi Jacob, would warn the women not to begin the blessing until the second candle was lit, lest the women accept the Sabbath and then continue lighting candles."
