= Solomon ben Meir =

12th century French rabbi

Rabbi Solomon ben Meir (Hebrew: שלמה בן מאיר, romanized: Rabbi Shlomo ben Meir) was Rashi's grandson. He was born after Rashi's death and is therefore named for his grandfather. He was one of the Tosafot.

== Biography ==
Rabbi Solomon was the son of Rabbi Meir ben Samuel and Jochebed. He was brother to Jacob (known as Rabbeinu Tam), Samuel (known as Rashbam) and Isaac (known as Rivam). His year of birth is unknown but it was after 1104.

He wrote a commentary on the Torah cited in the book Arugat Habosem by Rabbi Abraham ben Azriel.

He is mentioned once in Tsoafot, in Pesachim. Rashi's commentary on the Talmud implies that he may have compiled a book of halachic rulings. he is also mentioned once in Haggahot Maimuniyyot. In Machzor Vitry he is described as the person who announced the death of Rabbi Yosef, the son of Rabbeinu Tam.

He was an expert in Hebrew grammar and is known as "The father of grammar."

Rabbi Solomon died at a young age in Dampierre, France.

== Rashi's family circle ==
- Rashi
  - Yocheved bat Rashi & Meir ben Samuel
    - Isaac ben Meir (RIvaM)
    - Samuel ben Meir (RaShbaM)
    - Solomon ben Meir
    - Jacob ben Meir (Rabbeinu Tam)
      - Margolioth family
    - Hannah bat Meir & Samuel ben Simhah of Vitry
      - Isaac ben Samuel (RI HaZaken)
        - Elhanan ben Isaac of Dampierre (Rabbeinu Elkhanan)
          - Samuel ben Elhanan Jaffe
            - Jaffe family
  - Miriam bat Rashi & Judah ben Nathan (RIBaN)
    - Yom Tov ben Judah
      - Judah ben Yom Tov
        - Isaac ben Judah
          - Judah ben Isaac Messer Leon
          - daughter of Isaac ben Judah & Yechiel of Paris
            - Moses ben Yechiel
              - Joseph ben Moses
                - Matityahu ben Joseph
                  - Abraham ben Matityahu
                    - Lurie family and Treves family
  - Rachel bat Rashi & Eliezer

Rashi family tree

Isaac Hatzarfati
Samuel	Rashi
Meir	Jochebed	Rachel	Eliezer	Miriam	Judah ben Nathan
Samuel ben Meir	Rabbeinu Tam	Miriam	Samson ben Yosef	Rivam	Solomon ben Meir	Miriam	Samuel of Vitry	Yom Tov	Eliezer?
Isaac	Joseph	Solomon	Abraham of Sens	Judah ben Yom Tov	Joseph
Isaac ben Samuel
Isaac of Dampierre	Samson ben Abraham	Isaac
Rabbeinu Elhanan
Rabbi Jacob	Judah ben Isaac Messer Leon
Samuel ben Elhanan
Samuel of Acre

Notes:
- Rashi's daughters
