= Rashi's daughters =

Daughters of medieval Talmudic scholar, Rashi

Rashi's daughters were the three daughters and only children of the medieval Talmudic scholar, Rashi and his wife Rivka. Their three daughters were Yocheved, Miriam and Rachel (11th–12th century). They each married their father's finest students and were the mothers of the leaders of the next generation of French Talmudic scholars. Almost every Ashkenazi rabbinic dynasty traces its ancestry back to either Yocheved or Miriam, and the majority of the tosafists, were recent descendants of Rashi's daughters. All born in Troyes, France, their descendants inhabited Germany, France, and Italy in the early 11th to 15th centuries, with the majority later moving to Eastern Europe, where they established several notable rabbinic dynasties.

== Yocheved and family ==
Yocheved bat Shlomo Yitzchaki (Hebrew: יוכבד בת שלמה יצחקי) was born between 1058 and 1062 in Troyes, and died in 1135 in Ramerupt. She married Meir ben Samuel, son of Samuel of Vives and Miriam. He was born around 1060 in Ramerupt, where he died in 1135, a few months after her.

They had four sons: Isaac ben Meir, Samuel ben Meir, Solomon ben Meir, and Jacob ben Meir. Despite the modern Ashkenazi naming custom, Yocheved's son Solomon was born during her father's lifetime. Yocheved and Meir had at least two daughters: Hannah, who advised the local women to make the blessing after candle lighting and not before, and Miriam. Meir and Yocheved also had a grandson, Isaac ben Samuel of Dampierre.

Yocheved's name appears in MS de Rossi 181.

== Miriam and family ==
Miriam bat Shlomo Yitzchaki (Hebrew: מרים בת שלמה יצחקי) was born between 1058 and 1062 and died after 1090. She married Judah ben Nathan of Paris and Alvina. He was born around 1065 in Mainz and died around 1105 in Paris.

They had one known daughter, Alvina, a learned woman whose customs served as an example for other Jewish women. They also had three sons: Yom Tov ben Judah, Samson ben Judah and Eliezer ben Judah. Yom Tov later moved to Paris and headed a yeshiva there, along with his brothers.

== Rachel and another daughter ==
Rachel bat Shlomo Yitzchaki (Hebrew: רחל בת שלמה יצחקי) was born in Troyes around 1070. She married Rabbi Eliezer. They had no children.

Almost nothing is known about Rachel except for a letter that Rabbenu Tam wrote to his cousin, Yom Tov, in which he mentioned that their aunt Rachel was divorced from her husband, Eliezer. One of Rashi's responsa discusses the case of his young daughter losing a valuable ring at a time when Yocheved and Miriam were adults, so there was clearly another daughter much younger than her older sisters. In addition, Rashi is mentioned as having a grandson, Shemiah, and a granddaughter, Miriam, whose mother was neither Yocheved nor Miriam.

Avraham Grossman, based on a responsum that details how Rashi mourned for a little girl during a Jewish festival even though such mourning is prohibited, has postulated that he was mourning the death of his own young daughter, who would have been younger than Rachel.

== Rashi's family circle ==
- Rashi
  - Yocheved bat Rashi & Meir ben Samuel
    - Isaac ben Meir (RIvaM)
    - Samuel ben Meir (RaShbaM)
    - Solomon ben Meir
    - Jacob ben Meir (Rabbeinu Tam)
      - Margolioth family
    - [Hannah bat Meir] & Samuel ben Simhah of Vitry
      - Isaac ben Samuel (RI HaZaken)
        - Elhanan ben Isaac of Dampierre (Rabbeinu Elkhanan)
          - Samuel ben Elhanan Jaffe
            - Jaffe family
  - Miriam bat Rashi & Judah ben Nathan (RIBaN)
    - Yom Tov ben Judah
      - Judah ben Yom Tov
        - Isaac ben Judah
          - Judah ben Isaac Messer Leon
          - daughter of Isaac ben Judah & Yechiel of Paris
            - Moses ben Yechiel
              - Joseph ben Moses
                - Matityahu ben Joseph
                  - Abraham ben Matityahu
                    - Lurie family and Treves family
  - Rachel bat Rashi & Eliezer

Rashi family tree

Isaac Hatzarfati
Samuel	Rashi
Meir	Jochebed	Rachel	Eliezer	Miriam	Judah ben Nathan
Samuel ben Meir	Rabbeinu Tam	Miriam	Samson ben Yosef	Rivam	Solomon ben Meir	Miriam	Samuel of Vitry	Yom Tov	Eliezer?
Isaac	Joseph	Solomon	Abraham of Sens	Judah ben Yom Tov	Joseph
Isaac ben Samuel
Isaac of Dampierre	Samson ben Abraham	Isaac
Rabbeinu Elhanan
Rabbi Jacob	Judah ben Isaac Messer Leon
Samuel ben Elhanan
Samuel of Acre

Notes:
- Rashi's daughters

== Legends ==
There are a couple of legends about Rashi's daughters, all suggesting that they possessed unusual piety and scholarship.

The best-known states that they were learned in Torah and Talmud at a time when women were forbidden to study Talmud. A responsum of Rashi apparently notes that he is too weak to write and therefore is dictating to his daughter, but this is the result of copyist error, and in fact the responsum says that he was dictating to his grandson, Rashbam. Another version exists in which Rashbam is given explicitly as its author. In a separate responsum from the same period, Rashi dictates to "one of my brothers".

While there is no evidence that Rashi's daughters themselves wore tefillin, it is known that some women in 11th, 12th and 13th centuries France and Germany did and that Rashi's grandson Rabbenu Tam ruled a woman performing any mitzvah that she is not obligated to, including tefillin, must make the appropriate blessing.

== In popular culture ==
Maggie Anton wrote a trilogy of novels about Rashi's daughters, with each book named after one.

- Joheved (2005)
- Miriam (2007)
- Rachel (2009)
