= Samson ben Abraham of Sens =

French Jewish rabbi (c. 1150 – c. 1230)

- שמשון בן אברהם משאנץ
- Title: Rabbi (Rash)

Personal life
- Born: c. 1150 Falaise, Duchy of Normandy (present-day France)
- Died: c. 1230 Acre, Kingdom of Jerusalem (present-day Israel)
- Known for: Leading French Tosafist; commentaries on the Mishnah
- Relatives: Isaac of Dampierre (brother)

Religious life
- Religion: Judaism

Jewish leader
- Teacher: Rabbeinu Tam, David ben Kalonymus, Isaac ben Samuel

Samson ben Abraham of Sens (שמשון בן אברהם משאנץ; c. 1150 – c. 1230) was one of the leading French Tosafists in the second half of the 12th and the beginning of the 13th centuries. He was the most outstanding student and the spiritual heir of Rabbi Isaac ben Samuel ha-Zaken (the Ri). He is also known as "the Rash" ( הר"ש; an acronym of his name) or "the Prince of Sens", and within Tosafot as "Rashba".

== Biography ==
He was probably born in Falaise, Calvados, where his grandfather, the tosafist Samson ben Joseph, called "the Elder", lived. He studied under Rabbeinu Tam at Troyes and David ben Kalonymus of Münzenberg, and for ten years, together with his older brother R. Yitzhak (known as the "Ritzba"), attended the Yeshiva of Rabbi Isaac ben Samuel ha-Zaken (the Ri) of Dampierre, after whose death he took charge of the yeshiva of Sens. The Rosh said of him that only Rabbeinu Tam and Rabbi Isaac ben Samuel exercised greater influence upon Talmudical studies in France and in Germany during the 13th century.

The Rash sided with the opponents of Maimonides in their disputes. He kept up a lively correspondence with Rabbi Meïr Abulafia, and like him, condemned Maimonides' rationalistic views on bodily resurrection and Talmudic haggadah. He also sided with Rabbi Abulafia in his objection to some of Maimonides' halachic views, and reproached Maimonides for not having indicated the Talmudic sources in his Mishneh Torah. However, he did express his great admiration for Maimonides saying, "I have heard that the gates of wisdom have been revealed to him". Later on he quarreled with Rabbi Abulafia because Abulafia was offended by some of his remarks.

Due to persecution of the Jews by Pope Innocent III, the Rash joined 300 English and French rabbis in emigrating to Palestine about 1211. For some years he lived in Jerusalem, hence he is designated "the Jerusalemite" or "Rabbi Samson of the Land of Israel". He died in Acre around 1230 and he was buried at the foot of Mount Carmel. Just before his death, he was the founder of the Talmudic School of Acre. This allowed Yehiel of Paris, among others, to settle in Haifa after the trial of the Talmud in 1240 and a new expulsion of the Jews of France.

== Works ==
He authored many tosafot, abridged by Eliezer of Touques. They are fundamentally important, the principal sources for the interpretation of the Talmud. In addition to the many tosafot he composed, he also authored a commentary on two of the Mishnaic orders, Zeraim and Tohorot.

He frequently refers therein to the Jerusalem Talmud, to which he devoted more attention than any of his predecessors or contemporaries, and to the older compilations Tosefta, Mechilta, Sifra, and Sifre, and he tries to reconcile the discrepancies between them and the Mishnah. He refers to Nathan ben Jehiel, to Rashi, to Rabbi Isaac ben Melchizedek of Siponto, and other authorities, but never mentions Rambam's commentary, which he probably did not know.

According to Jacob ben Aksai, Rabbi Samson also wrote commentaries on Shekalim, Eduyot, Middot, and Dinnim, but none are extant.

He also wrote a commentary on the Sifra; for this, besides other older works, he utilized the commentary of Abraham ben David of Posquières (Rabad), which he quotes under the designation "Hachmei Lunel" or "Hachmei Provence", without mentioning the author's name.

Rabbi Meïr Abulafia speaks of Rabbi Samson's father, Abraham, as a pious, saintly, and noble man. Rabbi Samson's brother, Isaac of Dampierre (Riba), also known as Isaac the Younger to distinguish him from his teacher Isaac the Elder (Isaac ben Samuel), whom he succeeded as principal of the school of Dampierre, is also one of the prominent tosafists. He wrote some liturgical poems (piyutim) and a commentary on the Pentateuch. He died about 1210, and Rabbi Samson attended his funeral. Both brothers are frequently mentioned in works such as Or Zarua, The Mordechai, Orchot Chaim, SeMaG, Semak (authored by a student of the Rash), Kol Bo, Sha'are Dura, Haggahot Maimuniyyot, Terumat HaDeshen and similar works, and by Asher ben Jehiel and Meir of Rothenburg.

Rashi family tree

Isaac Hatzarfati
Samuel	Rashi
Meir	Jochebed	Rachel	Eliezer	Miriam	Judah ben Nathan
Samuel ben Meir	Rabbeinu Tam	Miriam	Samson ben Yosef	Rivam	Solomon ben Meir	Miriam	Samuel of Vitry	Yom Tov	Eliezer?
Isaac	Joseph	Solomon	Abraham of Sens	Judah ben Yom Tov	Joseph
Isaac ben Samuel
Isaac of Dampierre	Samson ben Abraham	Isaac
Rabbeinu Elhanan
Rabbi Jacob	Judah ben Isaac Messer Leon
Samuel ben Elhanan
Samuel of Acre

Notes:
- Rashi's daughters
