= Jaffe family =

Ashkenazi Jewish Rabbinic family

- Etymology: Jaffe (יפה) means "beautiful" in Hebrew.
- Origin: Dampierre, France
- Founded: 1150
- Founder: Elhanan Jaffe of Dampierre
- Traditions: Judaism

The Jaffe family (Hebrew: יפה) is an Ashkenazi Jewish Rabbinic family originally from Dampierre, France. The family descends from the 12th century Tosafist, Elhanan Jaffe of Dampierre (died 1184). Members of the family have produced numerous famous Rabbis, Court Jews, Talmudic scholars, scientists, businessmen, academics and politicians, with members in Germany, Bohemia, France, Lithuania, Poland, Russia, Great Britain, Italy, Canada, Israel and the United States.

== History ==
A descendant of the Kalonymos family, Elhanan Jaffe of Dampierre was the son of Isaac ben Samuel of Dampierre and the paternal great-grandson of Simhah ben Samuel of Vitry. Through his maternal grandmother, Elhanan Jaffe of Dampierre was the great-grandson of Meir ben Samuel and thus the great-great-grandson of the biblical commentator Rashi who has been claimed to be a 33rd-generation descendant of Johanan HaSandlar. Johanan HaSandlar claimed to be part of the Davidic line.

In the mid-13th-century the Jaffe family emigrated to Heidelberg, Germany where they occupied several prominent rabbinic positions. Following the rise of antisemitism in Germany, the majority of the family emigrated to other parts of Europe.

The modern progenitor of the family, Moses Jaffe of Bologna (d. 1480) was a Polish rabbi who was forced to live in Italy, where he served as the Av Beit Din of several communities. He and his wife Margolioth had a son, Abraham Jaffe of Bohemia (d. 1535), who established the Bohemian branch of the family. Abraham Jaffe's son Eliezer Jaffe of Hořovice (b. 1455), was a prominent Bohemian rabbi who fathered Joseph Jaffe of Prague (d. 1510) and Moses Jaffe of Kraków (d. 1520). Joseph Jaffe of Prague was the grandfather of the posek Mordecai Jaffe of Prague (1530–1612), and Moses Jaffe of Kraków was the grandfather of the halakhist Joel Sirkis-Jaffe of Kraków (1561–1640). The descendants of Joel Sirkis-Jaffe of Kraków served prominent and important rabbinic positions all over Poland and Ukraine. His son-in-law was David HaLevi Segal, and among Joel Sirkis-Jaffe's descendants is the prominent Ukrainian rabbi Betzalel HaLevi of Zhovkva (1710–1802), who was the maternal grandfather of the Hasidic master, Simcha Bunim of Peshischa (1765–1827).

The descendants of Mordecai Jaffe of Prague spread out throughout Europe. His descendants who emigrated to Western Europe and the United States became successful businessmen, politicians, scientists and academics, such as Theodor Julius Jaffé (1823–1898), Philipp Jaffé (1819–1870), Sir Otto Jaffe (1846–1929), Daniel Joseph Jaffé (1876–1921), Abraham Z. Joffe (1909–2000), Avraham Yoffe (1913–1983), Joel Joffe, Baron Joffe (1932–2017) and Josef Joffe (b. 1944) and Israel Joffe (1979). His descendants who moved to Eastern Europe continued to occupy key rabbinic positions, such as Dov Yaffe (1928–2017), Mordecai-Gimpel Jaffe (1820–1891) and Mordechai Jaffe (ca. 1742 - 1810), who founded the Lechovitch Hasidic dynasty.
