= Yom Tov of Falaise =

11th century French rabbi

Rabbi Yom Tov of Falaise, Hebrew: יום טוב מפלייזא also called Rabbi Yom Tov ben Rabbi Yehuda, was one of the 11th-century Baalei Tosafot in France.

== Family ==
His father was Judah ben Nathan (Rivan), who was Rashi's son-in-law, making him Rashi's grandson. He had a brother named Rabbi Eliezer.

His children were Rabbi Yehuda ben Yom Tov, the father-in-law of Rabbi Isaac ben Samuel (R'I the Elder), and Rabbi Yosef. His grandson was Rabbi Judah Messer Leon, and Bila, the youngest daughter of Rabbi Yosef ben Yom Tov, who married her uncle Rabbi Eliezer ben Rabbi Judah ben Yom Tov.

== Mentions ==
Rabbi Yom Tov is mentioned several times in Tosafot. He is also mentioned three times in Sefer haYashar

There is a Rabbi Yom Tov ben Judah mentioned in Tosafot and by Isaac ben Moses of Vienna in Ohr Zarua. Jacob Nahum Epstein and others identify him as Rabbi Yom Tov of Falaise who is mentioned by Mordechai ben Hillel in Shabbat. According to Ephraim Urbach, Rabbi Yom Tov moved to Paris.

Rabbeinu Tam described him as, "My teacher and my dear friend, my teacher, Rabbi Yom Tov, I am not worthy that you sent to me, but this is your student's opinion..."

Rashi family tree

Isaac Hatzarfati
Samuel	Rashi
Meir	Jochebed	Rachel	Eliezer	Miriam	Judah ben Nathan
Samuel ben Meir	Rabbeinu Tam	Miriam	Samson ben Yosef	Rivam	Solomon ben Meir	Miriam	Samuel of Vitry	Yom Tov	Eliezer?
Isaac	Joseph	Solomon	Abraham of Sens	Judah ben Yom Tov	Joseph
Isaac ben Samuel
Isaac of Dampierre	Samson ben Abraham	Isaac
Rabbeinu Elhanan
Rabbi Jacob	Judah ben Isaac Messer Leon
Samuel ben Elhanan
Samuel of Acre

Notes:
- Rashi's daughters
