= Siddur Rashi =

Medieval Jewish prayer book

- Author: Rashi (Solomon ben Isaac; 1040–1105)
- Original title: סדור רש"י
- Language: Hebrew
- Genre: siddur
- Publication date: 1911
- OCLC: 233165363
- Original text: סדור רש"י at Hebrew Wikisource

Siddur Rashi (Hebrew: סידור רש"י) is a medieval siddur (Jewish prayer book) attributed to Rashi (Solomon ben Isaac; 1040–1105), but composed by his pupils. It differs from the common siddur in that it focuses mainly on the various laws pertaining to the prayers, and less on the actual text of the prayers.

It was first published from manuscript in Berlin in 1910-1911, and was edited by Solomon Buber and J. Freimann, Rabbi of Holleschau.
