= Isaac ben Eliezer Halevi =

French Talmudist, liturgical poet and Tosafist

- רבי יצחק בן אליעזר הלוי
- Born: Lorraine
- Died: 1070
- Other names: Rabbi Isaac Segan Lewiyah

Rabbi Isaac ben Eliezer Halevi (Hebrew: רבי יצחק בן אליעזר הלוי; died 1070) also known as Rabbi Isaac Segan Lewiyah (Hebrew: רבי יצחק סגן לויה) was an 11th-century French Talmudist, liturgical poet and Tosafist who flourished in Germany.

Born in Lorraine, France, in his early years he studied under Gershom ben Judah, later moving to Worms where he served as the city's Chief Rabbi. He was an important teacher of Rashi, to whom he was apparently related. Rashi mentions him in his commentary on the Talmud and twice in his commentary on the Bible. He was the author of four wedding piyyutim, known as "Yotzer", "Ofan," "Zulat," and "Reshut". Abraham Zacuto states that he died in 1070 while Zunz states that he died between 1070 and 1096.
