= Pentateuch with Rashi's Commentary Translated into English =

Translation into English of Rashi's commentary on the Torah

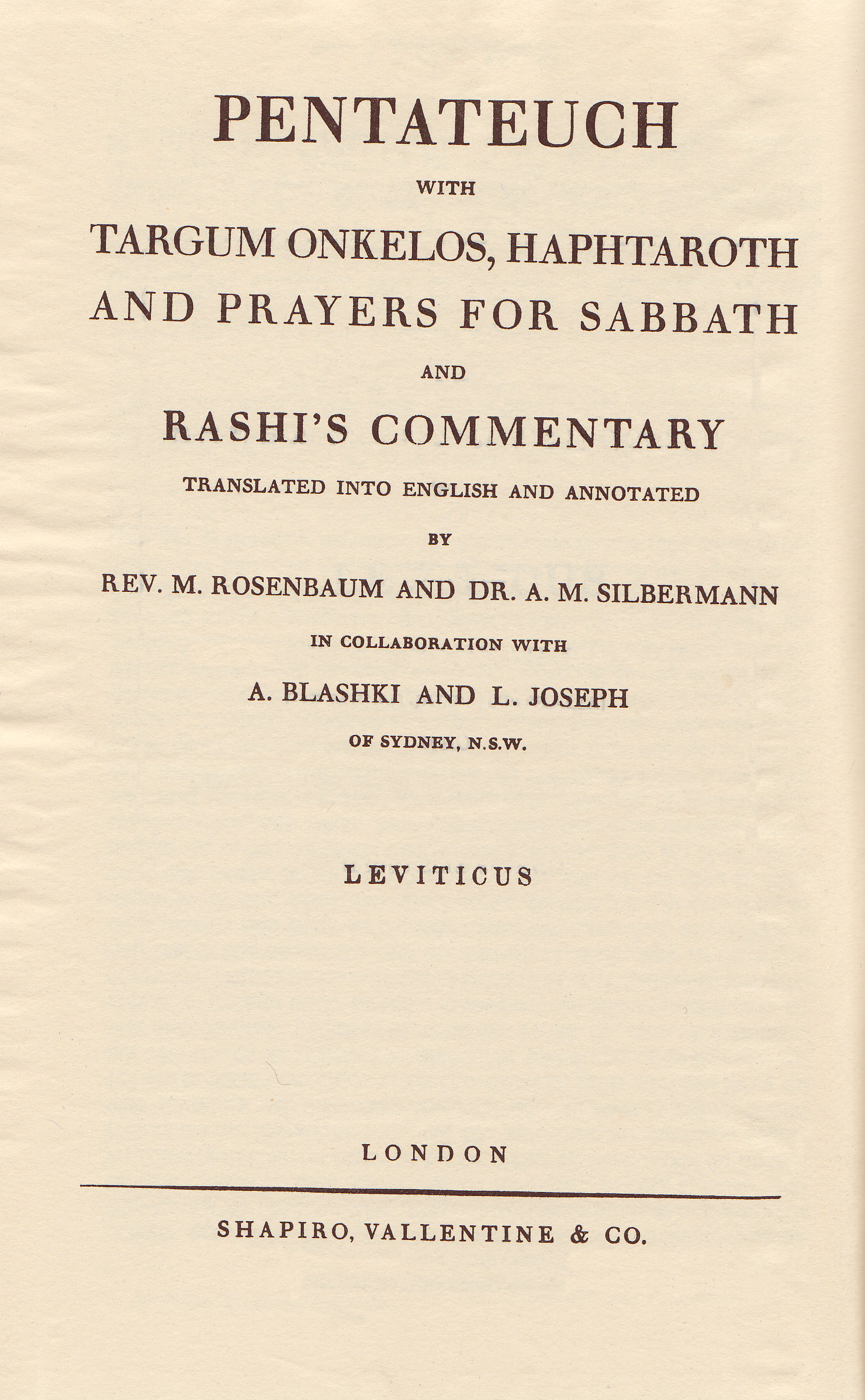
Title page of the Leviticus volume

The Pentateuch with Rashi's Commentary Translated into English was first published in London from 1929 to 1934 and is a scholarly English language translation of the full text of the Written Torah and Rashi's commentary on it. The five-volume work was produced and annotated by Rev. M. Rosenbaum and Dr Abraham M. Silbermann in collaboration with A. Blashki and L. Joseph. The work has an extensive appendix of notes which display notable critical scholarship; the authors tackle difficult comments of Rashi. All the Hebrew text, including the Rashi, is in pointed non-Rashi font. The work is commonly known today as "Silberman's Rashi" (even though he was the second named co-author).

== Authors ==
Morris Rosenbaum (1871–1947) was a UK rabbi. Abraham Morris (or Moritz) Silbermann (1889–1939) studied in Berlin and had settled in England; he was known for his 1927 German and English dictionary of the Talmud, Midrash and Targum (co-authored with Baruch Krupnik) and he was the publishing director of Shapiro, Valentine & Co. Aaron Blashki and Louis Joseph were learned laymen from Sydney, New South Wales.

== History ==
The work was first published by the East End Jewish publisher Shapiro, Valentine & Co: Genesis in 1929 and finally Deuteronomy in 1934. The volumes were printed in Wittenberg. The contemporary academic reviews were positive, even enthusiastic. The work is dedicated to Phillip Blashki and his wife Hannah.

The Silbermann family republished the work in collaboration with Routledge and Kegan Paul Ltd in 1973. In 2012 the Rashi translation was translated from English into German.
