= Judah ben Yom Tov =

11th century Tosafist

Rabbi Judah ben Yom Tov (Hebrew: יהודה בן יום טוב) was one of the Baalei Tosafot in France, a member of Rashi's family.

== Family ==
His father was Rabbi Yom Tov of Falaise, who was the son of Judah ben Nathan (known as Rivan), Rashi's son-in-law. His brother was Rabbi Yosef. He married the widow of Isaac ben Meir (known as (Rivam), the brother of Rashbam and Rabbeinu Tam, who was a cousin of his father, Rabbi Yom Tov.

His sons were Rabbi Yitzchak and Rabbi Eliezer. His daughter married Isaac ben Samuel of Dampierre. His grandson was Rabbi Judah ben Isaac Messer Leon.

In a manuscript it says that Rabbi Eliezer, son of Rabbi Judah son of Rabbi Yom Tov, married Beila, daughter of Rabbi Joseph, brother of Rabbi Judah.

In "Ohr Zarua" by Isaac ben Moses of Vienna, cites a responsa of Rashbam where he discussed Halakha before the elders of Paris, among them Rabbi Yehuda Bar Tov. This implies that Rabbi Judah lived in Paris.

== Mentions ==
He is cited in Tosafot in many places. He is also mentioned in the Tosafot of Samson ben Abraham of Sens (Tosafot Shantz) and Ohr Zarua.

== Rashi's family tree ==
Rashi family tree

Isaac Hatzarfati
Samuel	Rashi
Meir	Jochebed	Rachel	Eliezer	Miriam	Judah ben Nathan
Samuel ben Meir	Rabbeinu Tam	Miriam	Samson ben Yosef	Rivam	Solomon ben Meir	Miriam	Samuel of Vitry	Yom Tov	Eliezer?
Isaac	Joseph	Solomon	Abraham of Sens	Judah ben Yom Tov	Joseph
Isaac ben Samuel
Isaac of Dampierre	Samson ben Abraham	Isaac
Rabbeinu Elhanan
Rabbi Jacob	Judah ben Isaac Messer Leon
Samuel ben Elhanan
Samuel of Acre

Notes:
- Rashi's daughters
