= Elhanan ben Isaac of Dampierre =

French Tosafist

Elhanan ben Isaac Jaffe of Dampierre (Hebrew: ר׳ אֶלְחָנָן בֶּן יִצְחָק יָפֶה מִדַּמְפְּיֵיר; d. 1184) also known as Rabbeinu Elhanan was a 12th-century French Tosafist and the son of Isaac ben Samuel. He is mostly known for his numerous commentaries on the Talmudic tractates, Avodah Zarah and Yoma among other notable commentaries. He is also the founder of the Jaffe family.

== Biography ==
Born in Dampierre, France, his father was the head of the Dampierre Yeshiva. Rabbi Elhanan had several illustrious pupils, such as Judah ben Isaac Messer Leon. His tosafot are numerous and were often quoted by contemporary scholars, and are mentioned in "Minḥat Yehudah", "Shibbole ha-Leḳeṭ" and Rambam's "Sefer Hafla'ah". He is also credited for two works of his own: "Tiḳḳun Tefillin" - a treatise on Tefillin, and several piyyutim related to passover. Rabbi Elhanan was martyred in 1184.

Rashi family tree

Isaac Hatzarfati
Samuel	Rashi
Meir	Jochebed	Rachel	Eliezer	Miriam	Judah ben Nathan
Samuel ben Meir	Rabbeinu Tam	Miriam	Samson ben Yosef	Rivam	Solomon ben Meir	Miriam	Samuel of Vitry	Yom Tov	Eliezer?
Isaac	Joseph	Solomon	Abraham of Sens	Judah ben Yom Tov	Joseph
Isaac ben Samuel
Isaac of Dampierre	Samson ben Abraham	Isaac
Rabbeinu Elhanan
Rabbi Jacob	Judah ben Isaac Messer Leon
Samuel ben Elhanan
Samuel of Acre

Notes:
- Rashi's daughters
