= Isaac ben Abraham of Dampierre =

12th/13th-century tosafist, brother of Samson ben Abraham of Sens

Isaac ben Abraham (יצחק בן אברהם), also called Rabbi Isaac ha-Baḥur (Hebrew: ר״י הבחור or רבי יצחק הבחור, which translates to "Rabbi Isaac the Younger") and by its Hebrew acronym RIBA (ריב״א) or RIẒBA (ריצב״א), was a tosafist of the late twelfth and early thirteenth centuries.

He succeeded his teacher Isaac ben Samuel as head of the school of Dampierre, after which place he is often called, as well as by the epithet Isaac ha-Baḥur ("the younger"), to distinguish him from his teacher, Isaac ben Samuel ha-Zaḳen ("the elder") (ר״י הזקן).

Rabbi Isaac ben Samuel (R"I)	Rabbeinu Tam
Isaac ben Abraham of Dampierre
Judah ben Yakar	Samuel ben Elhanan	Natan ben Meir

Teachers
Students

== Life ==
Together with his brother, Samson ben Abraham of Sens, Isaac lived as a youth at Troyes, where he attended the lectures of Jacob Tam, and afterward at Sens, before the two studied together at Dampierre. Isaac died at Dampierre prior to 1210, not long before his brother Samson emigrated to Palestine.

Isaac was one of the French rabbis to whom Meïr ben Todros Abulafia addressed his letter against Maimonides' theory of resurrection. He is mentioned often in the edited tosafot, and by many other authorities, so it may be concluded that he wrote tosafot to several Talmudic treatises. Those to Bekorot were in the possession of Ḥayyim Michael of Hamburg. There are also frequently mentions to him as a Biblical commentator, and his ritual decisions and responsa are often quoted.

Isaac ben Abraham ha-Baḥur may also be identical with the liturgical poet Isaac ben Abraham who wrote a hymn beginning Yeshabbeḥuneka be-ḳol miflal, for Simchat Torah or for the Sabbath after it, and a selichah for Yom Kippur beginning Hen yom ba la-Adonai.

No complete work by him has survived, but his statements are cited in the tosafot to various tractates, chiefly Eruvin, Yoma, Mo'ed Katan, Yevamot, Ketubbot, Kiddushin, Nedarim, Bava Kamma, and Zevaḥim. He wrote numerous responsa, some of which are quoted in the Haggahot Maimuniyyot, the Or Zaru'a and in other works. During the Maimonidean controversy, Meir b. Todros Abulafia, an opponent of the books of Maimonides, approached him in 1202 to express his opinion. Among those who addressed problems to him was Jonathan b. David, the leading scholar of Lunel. There is mention of a work by him on the Passover seder, entitled Yesod Rabbenu Yiẓḥak b. Avraham be-Leilei Pesaḥ. His pupils included Nathan b. Meir and *Judah b. Yakar, the teachers of Naḥmanides, and Samuel b. Elhanan.

Of this school, Scholem notes:

The tradition which ascribes to some of the most famous Tosafists a preference for the study of old mystical tracts, if not the actual practice of mystical rites, is by no means simply a legend. The various testimonies to this effect are quite independent of each other, and for the rest a careful study of their occasional ventures into theology leaves no doubt that they draw their inspiration from mystical ideas on the subject of creation, the Merkabah, and even the Shiur Komah. One of the greatest masters of this school of casuists, Isaac of Dampierre, whom one would be the last to suspect of mystical leanings, was said to be a visionary; we have a commentary to the Book of Creation, written by Elhanan ben Yakar of London, which was based on his lectures, and one of his most famous pupils, Ezra of Montcontour, whose cognomen "The Prophet" was by no means intended to be merely an honorific appellation, is known to have practised Merkabah mysticism. His "ascents to heaven" are attested by several witnesses, and his possession of prophetic gifts was regarded as proved. "He showed signs and miracles. One heard a voice speak to him from a cloud, as God spoke to Moses. Great scholars, among them Eleazar of Worms, after days of fasting and prayer, were granted the revelation that all his words were truth and not deception. He also produced Talmudic explanations the like of which had never been heard before, and he revealed the mysteries of the Torah and the Prophets."

Rashi family tree

Isaac Hatzarfati
Samuel	Rashi
Meir	Jochebed	Rachel	Eliezer	Miriam	Judah ben Nathan
Samuel ben Meir	Rabbeinu Tam	Miriam	Samson ben Yosef	Rivam	Solomon ben Meir	Miriam	Samuel of Vitry	Yom Tov	Eliezer?
Isaac	Joseph	Solomon	Abraham of Sens	Judah ben Yom Tov	Joseph
Isaac ben Samuel
Isaac of Dampierre	Samson ben Abraham	Isaac
Rabbeinu Elhanan
Rabbi Jacob	Judah ben Isaac Messer Leon
Samuel ben Elhanan
Samuel of Acre

Notes:
- Rashi's daughters
