= Judah ben Nathan =

12th century bible commentator, son-in-law of Rashi

Judah ben Nathan, also referred to by the Hebrew acronym RiVaN, was a gifted French rabbi and commentator on the Talmud in the eleventh to twelfth century, best known for being the son-in-law and pupil of the great commentator Rashi, and to a great extent his continuator.

It was Judah who completed Rashi's commentary on tractate Makkot of the Talmud (from 19b to the end), and who wrote the commentary on Nazir which is erroneously attributed to Rashi. He is also known to have written independent commentaries on Eruvin, Shabbat, Yevamot, and Pesahim. Finally, Halberstam manuscript No. 323 contains a fragment of Judah's commentary on Nedarim.

He also contributed some of the first tosafot (additions) to Rashi's Talmud commentary, pulling out certain points in greater detail. It is generally considered that Judah b. Nathan wrote tosafot to several treatises of the Talmud, and he is mentioned as a tosafist in Haggahot Mordekhai (Sanhedrin, No. 696). He is often quoted in the edited tosafot.

Judah married Rashi's second daughter Miriam, and they had several children. Their son Yom Tov later moved to Paris and headed a yeshiva there, along with his brothers Shimson and Eliezer; their daughter, Alvina, was a learned woman whose customs served as the basis for later halakhic decisions.

Rashi family tree

Isaac Hatzarfati
Samuel	Rashi
Meir	Jochebed	Rachel	Eliezer	Miriam	Judah ben Nathan
Samuel ben Meir	Rabbeinu Tam	Miriam	Samson ben Yosef	Rivam	Solomon ben Meir	Miriam	Samuel of Vitry	Yom Tov	Eliezer?
Isaac	Joseph	Solomon	Abraham of Sens	Judah ben Yom Tov	Joseph
Isaac ben Samuel
Isaac of Dampierre	Samson ben Abraham	Isaac
Rabbeinu Elhanan
Rabbi Jacob	Judah ben Isaac Messer Leon
Samuel ben Elhanan
Samuel of Acre

Notes:
- Rashi's daughters
