= Judah ben Isaac Messer Leon =

French tosafist

Personal life
- Born: 1166 Paris, France
- Died: 1224 (aged 57–58) Paris, France
- Parent: Isaac ben Judah (father)

Religious life
- Religion: Judaism

Judah ben Isaac Messer Leon (1166–1224) was a French tosafist born in Paris.

== Biography ==
Born in 1166 in Paris, France, his father Rabbi Isaac Treves was a rabbi in Paris, son of Yom Tov of Falaise who was the son of Judah ben Nathan (Rivan), and thus a descendant of Rashi. In his early years, he learnt under Isaac ben Samuel of Dampierre and his son Elhanan ben Isaac of Dampierre. He married a daughter of Abraham ben Joseph of Orleans, who has been identified by Jacobs with Abraham fil Rabbi Joce, chief Jew in London in 1186. In a list of that year associated with Abraham occurs the name of Leo Blund, whom Jacobs identifies with Judah ben Isaac.

Sir Leon must have left Paris in 1182, when all Jews were expelled from the French king's dominions; he did not return until 1198. According to Gross, however, he received his chief training at Dampierre under Samson of Sens, Samson of Coucy, Solomon of Dreux, and Abraham ben Nathan of Lunel. Shortly after 1198 he returned to Paris and founded an important school of tosafists, in which were trained, among others, Jehiel ben Joseph (Sir Leon's successor), Isaac ben Moses of Vienna (author of Or Zarua), Samuel ben Solomon of Falaise (Sir Morel of Falaise), and Moses of Coucy.

== Teachings ==
He appears to have composed tosafot to most of the tractates of the Talmud, traces being found of his annotations to twenty tractates. The only collection that has been published are his additamenta to Berakot, published at Warsaw in 1863. A long fragment of his tosafot to Abodah Zarah is still extant in a manuscript that formerly belonged to Samuel David Luzzatto and Solomon Joachim Halberstam 'R.E.J.'s session of Jews' College, London. A few of his responsa are also found, chiefly in various additions to the Mordecai, while reference is also found to his commentary on the Pentateuch, in which he appears to have followed the method of Rashbam.

Judah wrote several poems—an Aramaic description of the Ten Commandments, a pizmon, and a piyyut. He is not, however, to be identified with the mystical Yehudah HaChasid, to whom are attributed Sefer Hasidim and an ethical will. The writers whom Judah quotes include Amram Gaon, Sherira Gaon, Hai Gaon, Nissim Gaon, Alfasi, Maimonides, Elijah ben Menahem, Gershom ben Judah, Jacob of Orleans, Jacob of Corbeil, Joseph Kara, Joseph Bekor Shor, Yom-Tov of Joigny, and Rashi.

He died in Paris in 1224.

Rashi family tree

Isaac Hatzarfati
Samuel	Rashi
Meir	Jochebed	Rachel	Eliezer	Miriam	Judah ben Nathan
Samuel ben Meir	Rabbeinu Tam	Miriam	Samson ben Yosef	Rivam	Solomon ben Meir	Miriam	Samuel of Vitry	Yom Tov	Eliezer?
Isaac	Joseph	Solomon	Abraham of Sens	Judah ben Yom Tov	Joseph
Isaac ben Samuel
Isaac of Dampierre	Samson ben Abraham	Isaac
Rabbeinu Elhanan
Rabbi Jacob	Judah ben Isaac Messer Leon
Samuel ben Elhanan
Samuel of Acre

Notes:
- Rashi's daughters

== See also ==
- Tosafists
