= Semak =

Semak (Ukrainian, Russian: Сема́к) is a Ukrainian surname that may refer to:

- Alexander Semak (born 1966), Soviet and Russian ice hockey player
- Andrei Semak (born 1974), Russian footballer
- Sergei Semak (born 1976), Russian footballer

== Other ==
- The Sefer Mitzvot Katan, by Isaac ben Joseph of Corbeil
