= Sefer haYashar (Rabbeinu Tam) =

Treatise on Jewish ritual authored by Rabbeinu Tam

Sefer HaYashar (Hebrew: ספר הישר, the Book of the Upright) is a famous treatise on Jewish ritual authored by Rabbeinu Tam (Rabbi Jacob ben Meir, 1100–1171). The work, which survives in a somewhat incomplete and amended form, was printed in Venice in 1544 and reprinted in Vienna in 1811.

It is especially concerned with reconciling apparently contradictory decisions in different sections of the Talmud and with preserving Talmud text unchanged against those who wanted to make clever emendations.

This Sefer ha-Yashar was used a great deal by later Talmudists and introduced the form of literature called Tosafot 'Additional Notes'.

== Editions ==
- Sefer ha-yashar (Vienna, 1811).
- Sefer ha-yashar le-rabenu Tam, ed. Simon Solomon Schlesinger (Jerusalem, 1959). Critical edition of first section (novellae = Hebr. hiddushim).
- Sefer ha-yashar, ed. Ferdinand Rosenthal (Berlin, 1898; repr. Jerusalem, 1975). Critical edition of second section (responsa).
