= Isaac ben Samuel =

12th-century French Tosafist

Isaac ben Samuel the Elder (c. 1115 – c. 1184), also known as the Ri ha-Zaken (Hebrew: ר״י הזקן), was a French tosafist and Biblical commentator. He flourished at Ramerupt and Dampierre, France in the twelfth century. He is the father of Elhanan ben Isaac of Dampierre.

Rabbeinu Tam
Isaac ben Samuel
Isaac ben Abraham of Dampierre	Judah ben Isaac Messer Leon	Abraham ben Nathan	Samson ben Abraham of Sens	Baruch ben Isaac

Teachers
Students

== Biography ==
Through his mother he was a great-grandson of Rashi and through his father he was a grandson of Simhah ben Samuel of Vitry. He was surnamed "ha-Zaḳen" (the elder) to distinguish him from another tosafist of the same name, Isaac ben Abraham surnamed "ha-Baḥur" (the younger). He is often quoted as R. Isaac of Dampierre. but it seems that he lived first at Ramerupt, where his maternal grandfather resided. It was also at Ramerupt that he studied under his uncle Rabbeinu Tam after the latter had gone to Troyes, Isaac b. Samuel directed his school.

Isaac settled at Dampierre later, and founded there a flourishing and well-attended school. It is said that he had sixty pupils, each of whom, besides being generally well grounded in Talmud, knew an entire treatise by heart, so that the whole Talmud was stored in the memories of his pupils. As he lived under Philip Augustus, at whose hands the Jews suffered much, Isaac prohibited the buying of confiscated Jewish property, and ordered that any so bought be restored to its original owner. A particular interest attaches to one of his responsa, in which he relies on the oral testimony of his aunt, the wife of R. Isaac b. Meïr, and on that of the wife of R. Eleazar of Worms, a great-granddaughter of Rashi.

He died, according to Heinrich Graetz about 1200; according to Henri Gross between 1185 and 1195; and as he is known to have reached an advanced age, Gross supposes that he was not born later than 1115. On the other hand, Michael says that as Isaac b. Samuel was spoken of as "the sainted master" a term generally given to martyrs, he may have been killed at the same time as his son Elhanan (1184).

== Tosafot ==
Isaac's tosafot completed the commentary of Rashi on the Talmud (Romm included in his edition of the Talmud the commentary of Abraham of Montpellier on Kiddushin, misidentified as Isaac's tosafot.). He also compiled and edited with great erudition all the preceding explanations to Rashi's commentary. His first collection was entitled Tosefot Yeshanim, which, however, was afterward revised and developed. He is quoted on almost every page of the Tosafot, and in various works, especially in the Sefer ha-Terumah of his pupil Baruch ben Isaac of Worms, and in the Or Zarua of Isaac ben Moses.

Isaac is mentioned as a Biblical commentator by Judah ben Eliezer, who quotes also a work of Isaac's entitled Yalkutei Midrash; by Isaac ha-Levi; by Hezekiah ben Manoah in his Ḥazzeḳuni; and in two other commentaries. Isaac is supposed to be the author also of several liturgical poems, of a piyyuṭ to the hafṭarah, and of a piyyuṭ for Purim. The authorship of these piyyuṭim may, however, belong to the liturgical writer Isaac ben Samuel of Narbonne.

Rashi family tree

Isaac Hatzarfati
Samuel	Rashi
Meir	Jochebed	Rachel	Eliezer	Miriam	Judah ben Nathan
Samuel ben Meir	Rabbeinu Tam	Miriam	Samson ben Yosef	Rivam	Solomon ben Meir	Miriam	Samuel of Vitry	Yom Tov	Eliezer?
Isaac	Joseph	Solomon	Abraham of Sens	Judah ben Yom Tov	Joseph
Isaac ben Samuel
Isaac of Dampierre	Samson ben Abraham	Isaac
Rabbeinu Elhanan
Rabbi Jacob	Judah ben Isaac Messer Leon
Samuel ben Elhanan
Samuel of Acre

Notes:
- Rashi's daughters
