= Meir ben Samuel =

11th century French rabbi and tosafist

Meir ben Samuel (Hebrew: מאיר בן שמואל), also known by the Hebrew acronym RaM for Rabbi Meir, was a French rabbi and tosafist, who was born in about 1060 in Ramerupt, and died after 1135. His father was an eminent scholar. Meir received his education in the Talmudical schools of Lorraine, his principal teachers being Isaac ben Asher ha-Levi and Eleazar ben Isaac of Mainz, with whom he later carried on a correspondence.

Meir married Rashi's first daughter, Jochebed, by whom he had three sons, Samuel ben Meïr (RaSHBaM), Isaac ben Meïr (RIBaM), and Jacob ben Meïr (Rabbenu Tam), all of them well-known scholars. According to Gross, Meir had also a fourth son, Solomon. Simhah ben Samuel of Vitry's son Samuel, father of the tosafist Isaac the Elder, was Meir's son-in-law. Meir's son Isaac, the often-quoted tosafist, died in the prime of life, leaving seven children. This loss distressed the father to such an extent that he felt indisposed to answer a halakic question addressed to him by his friend Eleazar ben Nathan of Mainz.

Meir lived to a very old age, and is sometimes designated as "the old" (ha-yashish). From the fact that his grandson, Isaac ben Samuel (born about 1120) speaks of religious customs which he found conspicuous in his grandfather's house, and from other indications, it has been concluded that Meir was still alive in 1135.

Meir was one of the founders of the school of tosafists in northern France. Not only his son and pupil Rabbenu Tam, but also the tosafot quote his ritual decisions. It was Meir who changed the text of the Kol Nidre formula. A running commentary on a whole passage of the Gemara, written by him and his son Samuel in the manner of Rashi's commentary, is printed at the end of the first chapter of Menachot. Meir composed also a seliḥah beginning "Avo lefanekha," which has been translated into German by Zunz, but which has no considerable poetic value.

Rashi family tree

Isaac Hatzarfati
Samuel	Rashi
Meir	Jochebed	Rachel	Eliezer	Miriam	Judah ben Nathan
Samuel ben Meir	Rabbeinu Tam	Miriam	Samson ben Yosef	Rivam	Solomon ben Meir	Miriam	Samuel of Vitry	Yom Tov	Eliezer?
Isaac	Joseph	Solomon	Abraham of Sens	Judah ben Yom Tov	Joseph
Isaac ben Samuel
Isaac of Dampierre	Samson ben Abraham	Isaac
Rabbeinu Elhanan
Rabbi Jacob	Judah ben Isaac Messer Leon
Samuel ben Elhanan
Samuel of Acre

Notes:
- Rashi's daughters

== Footnotes ==
Its bibliography: Chaim Azulai, Shem ha-Gedolim, ed. Wilna, i. 118, No. 11; Heinrich Grätz, Gesch. vi. 68-144; Henri Gross, Gallia Judaica, pp. 304, 542, 635; D. Rosin, Samuel ben Meïr als Schrifterklärer, in Jahresbericht des Jüdisch-Theologischen Seminars, pp. 3 et seq., Breslau, 1880; Isaac Hirsch Weiss, Dor, iv. 336; Isaac Hirsch Weiss, Sefer Toledot Gedole Yisrael (Toledot R. Ya'aḳob ben Meïr), p. 4, Vienna, 1883; Leopold Zunz, Z. G. p. 31.
