= Rashi =

French rabbi and commentator (1040–1105)

Rashi רש״י
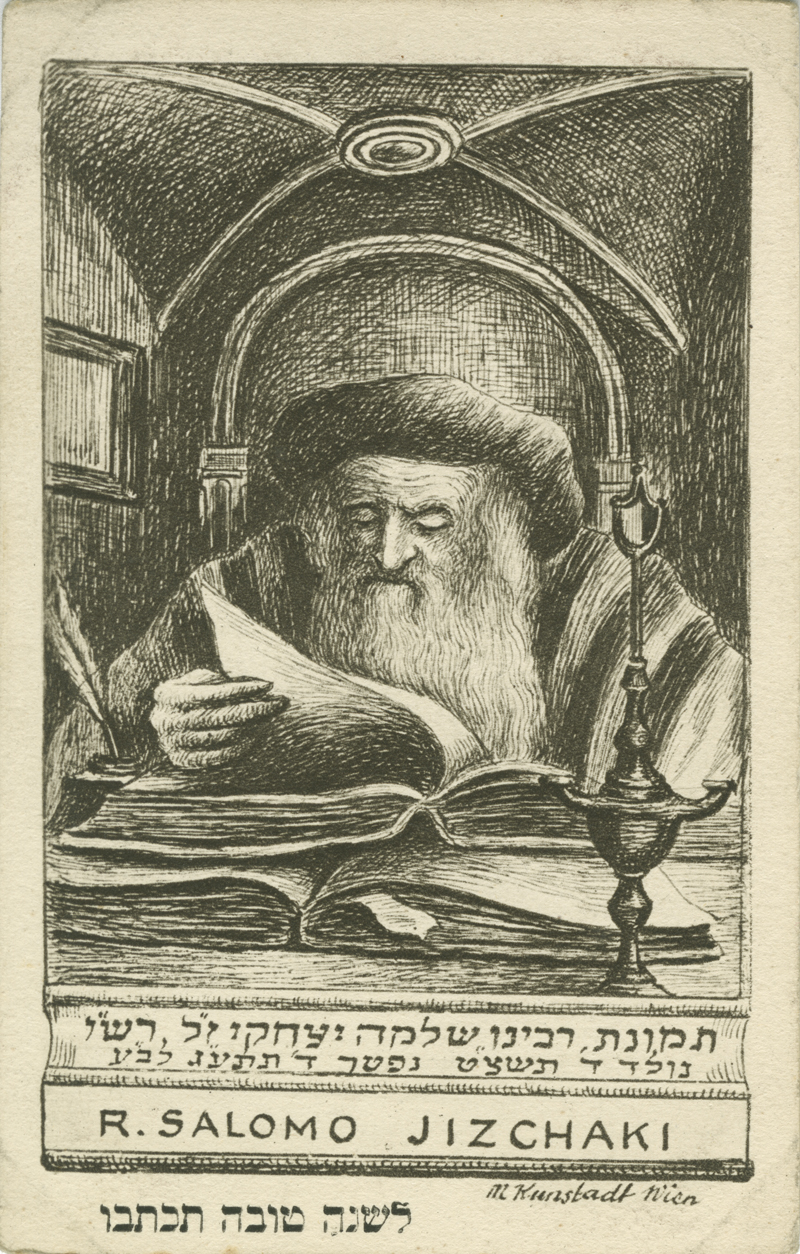
- Postcard of Rashi from the early 1900s
- Born: Shlomo Yitzchaki c. 1040; Troyes, County of Champagne, France
- Died: 13 July 1105 (aged 64–65); Troyes, County of Champagne, France
- Resting place: Troyes
- Other names: Latin: Salomon Isaacides; French: Salamon ben Isaac de Troyes
- Occupations: Rabbi; Winemaker (according to tradition)
- Known for: Commentaries on the Talmud and Hebrew Bible
- Notable work: Commentary on the Talmud; Commentary on the Tanakh (the Chumash); Responsa; Selichot
- Children: 3 daughters

Shlomo Yitzchaki (Note: Latin: Salomon Isaacides; French: Salomon ben Isaac de Troyes) (Hebrew: רבי שלמה יצחקי, romanized: Rabbî Šĕlōmō Yiṣḥāqî; c. 22 February 1040 – 13 July 1105), commonly known by the Rabbinic acronym Rashi (רש״י), was a French rabbi and commentator who authored comprehensive commentaries on the Talmud and Hebrew Bible.

Born in Troyes, Rashi studied Torah studies in Worms under German rabbi Yaakov ben Yakar and French rabbi Isaac ben Eliezer Halevi, both of whom were pupils of the famed scholar Gershom ben Judah. After returning to Troyes, Rashi joined the beth din, began answering halakhic questions and later served as the beth din's head after the death of Zerach ben Abraham.

Rashi is generally considered a leading biblical exegete in the Middle Ages. Acclaimed for his ability to present the basic meaning of the text in a concise and lucid fashion, Rashi's commentaries appeal to both learned scholars and beginning students, and his works remain a centerpiece of contemporary Torah study. A large fraction of rabbinic literature published since the Middle Ages discusses Rashi, either using his view as supporting evidence or debating against it. His commentary on the Talmud, which covers nearly all of the Babylonian Talmud, has been included in every edition of the Talmud since its first printing by Daniel Bomberg in the 1520s. His commentaries on the Tanakh—especially his commentary on the Chumash (the "Five Books of Moses")—serves as the basis of more than 300 "supercommentaries" which analyze Rashi's choice of language and citations, penned by some of the greatest names in rabbinic literature.

== Name ==
Rashi's surname, Yitzhaki, derives from his father's name, Yitzhak. The acronym "Rashi" stands for Rabbi Shlomo Yitzhaki, but is sometimes fancifully expanded as Rabban Shel YIsrael which means the "Rabbi of Israel", or as Rabbenu SheYichyeh (Our Rabbi, may he live). He may be cited in Hebrew and Aramaic texts as (1) "Shlomo son of Rabbi Yitzhak", (2) "Shlomo son of Yitzhak", (3) "Shlomo Yitzhaki", and myriad similar highly respectful derivatives.

In older literature, Rashi is sometimes referred to as Jarchi or Yarhi (ירחי), his abbreviated name being interpreted as Rabbi Shlomo Yarhi. This was understood to refer to the Hebrew name of Lunel in Provence, popularly derived from the Occitan luna "moon", in Hebrew ירח, in which Rashi was assumed to have lived at some time or to have been born, or where his ancestors were supposed to have originated. Later Christian writers Richard Simon and Johann Christoph Wolf claimed that only Christian scholars referred to Rashi as Jarchi, and that this epithet was unknown to the Jews. Bernardo de Rossi, however, demonstrated that Hebrew scholars also referred to Rashi as Yarhi. In 1839, Leopold Zunz showed that the Hebrew usage of Jarchi was an erroneous propagation of the error by Christian writers, instead he interpreted the abbreviation as: Rabbi Shlomo Yitzhaki. The evolution of this term has been thoroughly traced.

== Biography ==
=== Birth and early life ===
Rashi was an only child born at Troyes, Champagne, in northern France. His mother's brother was Simeon bar Isaac, rabbi of Mainz. Simeon was a disciple of Gershom ben Judah, who died that same year. On his father's side, Rashi has been claimed to be a 33rd-generation descendant of Johanan HaSandlar, who was a fourth-generation descendant of Gamaliel, who was reputedly descended from the Davidic line. In his voluminous writings, Rashi himself made no such claim at all. The main early rabbinical source about his ancestry, Responsum No. 29 by Solomon Luria, makes no such claim either.

=== Legends ===
His fame later made him the subject of many legends. One tradition contends that his parents were childless for many years. Rashi's father, Yitzhak, a poor winemaker, once found a precious jewel and was approached by non-Jews who wished to buy it to adorn their idol. Yitzhak agreed to travel with them to their land, but en route, he cast the gem into the sea. Afterwards he was visited by either the Voice of God or the prophet Elijah, who told him that he would be rewarded with the birth of a noble son "who would illuminate the world with his Torah knowledge."

Another legend also states that Rashi's parents moved to Worms, Germany while Rashi's mother was pregnant. As she walked down one of the narrow streets in the Jewish quarter, she was imperiled by two oncoming carriages. She turned and pressed herself against a wall, which opened to receive her. This miraculous niche is still visible in the wall of the Worms Synagogue.

Additional legends, particularly in Hasidic literature, postulate that Rashi's tremendous works and accomplishments were inspired by the Holy Spirit, the Shekhinah, as no mere human could produce such immense works. One text goes so far as to claim that Rashi was beyond human; the author proposes that he never died a natural death, but rather ascended to Heaven alive like the immortal prophet Elijah.

=== Yeshiva studies ===
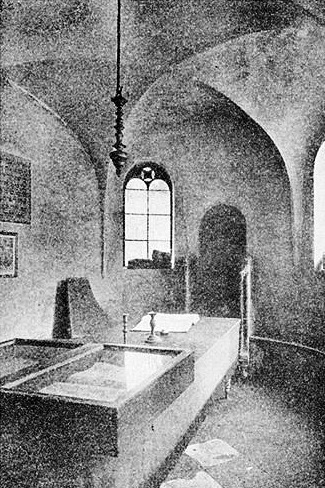
Rashi Synagogue, Worms

According to tradition, Rashi was first brought to learn Torah by his father on Shavuot day at the age of five. His father was his main Torah teacher until his death when Rashi was still a youth. At the age of 17 he married and soon after went to learn in the yeshiva of Yaakov ben Yakar in Worms, returning to his wife three times yearly, for the Days of Awe, Passover and Shavuot. When Yaakov died in 1064, Rashi continued learning in Worms for another year in the yeshiva of his relative, Isaac ben Eliezer Halevi, who was also chief rabbi of Worms. Then he moved to Mainz, where he studied under another of his relatives, Isaac ben Judah, the rabbinic head of Mainz and one of the leading sages of the Lorraine region straddling France and Germany.

Rashi's teachers were students of Rabbeinu Gershom and Eliezer Hagadol, leading Talmudists of the previous generation. From his teachers, Rashi imbibed the oral traditions pertaining to the Talmud as they had been passed down for centuries, as well as an understanding of the Talmud's logic and forms of argument. Rashi took concise, copious notes from what he learned in yeshiva, incorporating this material in his commentaries. He was also greatly influenced by the exegetical principles of Menahem Kara.

=== Career ===
He returned to Troyes at the age of 25, after which time his mother died, and he was asked to join the Troyes Beth din (rabbinical court). He also began answering halakhic questions. Upon the death of the head of the Bet din, Zerach ben Abraham, Rashi assumed the court's leadership and answered hundreds of halakhic queries.

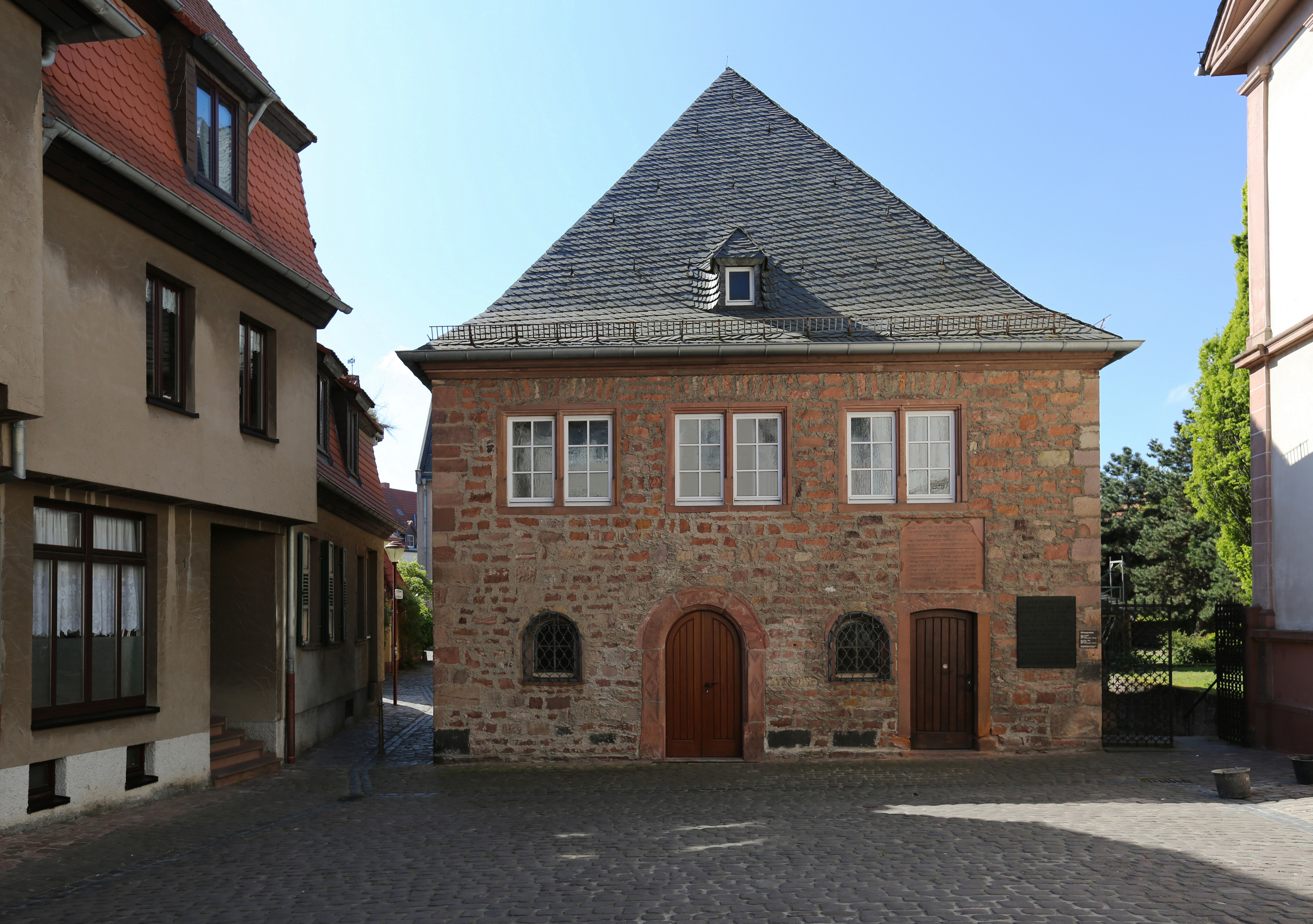
Exterior of Rashi's Synagogue, Worms, Germany

At some time around 1070 he founded a yeshiva, which attracted many disciples. Jewish oral tradition contends that he was a vintner. There is no evidence for this, although Rashi shows an extensive knowledge of winemaking utensils and process. One responsum from his school refers to a barrel of wine marked with Rashi's import seal. The soil around Troyes is not suited to growing grapes, but some vineyards are known to have existed anyway, due to the great local demand for wine.

Although there are many legends about his travels, Rashi likely never went farther than from the Seine to the Rhine; his furthest destinations were the yeshivas of Lorraine.

In 1096, the People's Crusade swept through the Lorraine, murdering 12 Jews and uprooting whole communities. Among those murdered in Worms were the three sons of Isaac ben Eliezer Halevi, Rashi's teacher. Rashi wrote several Selichot (penitential poems) mourning the slaughter and the destruction of the region's great yeshivot. Seven of Rashi's Selichot still exist, including Adonai Elohei Hatz'vaot, which is recited on the eve of Rosh Hashanah, and Az Terem Nimtehu, which is recited on the Fast of Gedalia.

=== Death and burial site ===
Rashi died on July 13, 1105 (Tammuz 29, 4865) at the age of 65. He was buried in Troyes. The approximate location of the cemetery in which he was buried was recorded in Seder ha-Dorot, but over time the location of the cemetery was forgotten. A number of years ago, a Sorbonne professor discovered an ancient map depicting the site of the cemetery, which lay under an open square in the city of Troyes. After this discovery, French Jews erected a large monument by the sculptor Raymond Moretti in the center of the square—a large, black and white globe featuring the three Hebrew letters of רשי artfully arranged counterclockwise in negative space, evoking the style of Hebrew microcalligraphy. The granite base of the monument is engraved: Rabbi Shlomo Yitzchaki — Commentator and Guide.

In 2005, Yisroel Meir Gabbai erected an additional plaque at this site marking the square as a burial ground. The plaque reads: "The place you are standing on is the cemetery of the town of Troyes. Many Rishonim are buried here, among them Rabbi Shlomo, known as Rashi the holy, may his merit protect us".

=== Descendants ===
Rashi had no sons. All of his three children were girls, named Yocheved, Miriam and Rachel. He invested himself in their education; his writings and the legends which surround him suggest that his daughters were well-versed in the Torah and the Talmud (at a time when women were not expected to study) and would help him when he was too weak to write. His daughters married his disciples; most present-day Ashkenazi rabbinical dynasties can trace their lineage back to his daughters Miriam or Yocheved.

A late-20th century legend claims that Rashi's daughters wore tefillin. While a few women in medieval Ashkenaz did wear tefillin, there is no evidence that Rashi's daughters did.

- Rashi's oldest daughter, Yocheved, married Meir ben Samuel; their four sons were Shmuel (Rashbam; born 1080), Yitzchak (Rivam; born 1090), Jacob (Rabbeinu Tam; born 1100), and Shlomo the Grammarian, all of whom were among the most prolific Tosafists. Yocheved's daughter, Channah, is reputed to have instructed the local women to recite the blessing after candle lighting (instead of before).
- Rashi's middle daughter, Miriam, married Judah ben Nathan, who completed the commentary on the Talmud Makkot. Their daughter Alvina was a learned woman whose customs served as the basis for later halakhic decisions. Their son Yom Tov later moved to Paris and headed a yeshiva there, together with his brothers Shimshon and Eliezer.
- Rashi's youngest daughter, Rachel, married (and divorced) Eliezer ben Shemiah. Little else is known about her.

A significant proportion of Ashkenazi Jews are direct descendants of Rashi.

It is reputed that the famous Polish Talmudist Moses Isserles (1530–1572) was a descendant of Rashi.

Rashi family tree

Isaac Hatzarfati
Samuel	Rashi
Meir	Jochebed	Rachel	Eliezer	Miriam	Judah ben Nathan
Samuel ben Meir	Rabbeinu Tam	Miriam	Samson ben Yosef	Rivam	Solomon ben Meir	Miriam	Samuel of Vitry	Yom Tov	Eliezer?
Isaac	Joseph	Solomon	Abraham of Sens	Judah ben Yom Tov	Joseph
Isaac ben Samuel
Isaac of Dampierre	Samson ben Abraham	Isaac
Rabbeinu Elhanan
Rabbi Jacob	Judah ben Isaac Messer Leon
Samuel ben Elhanan
Samuel of Acre

Notes:
- Rashi's daughters

== Works ==
=== Commentary on the Tanakh ===
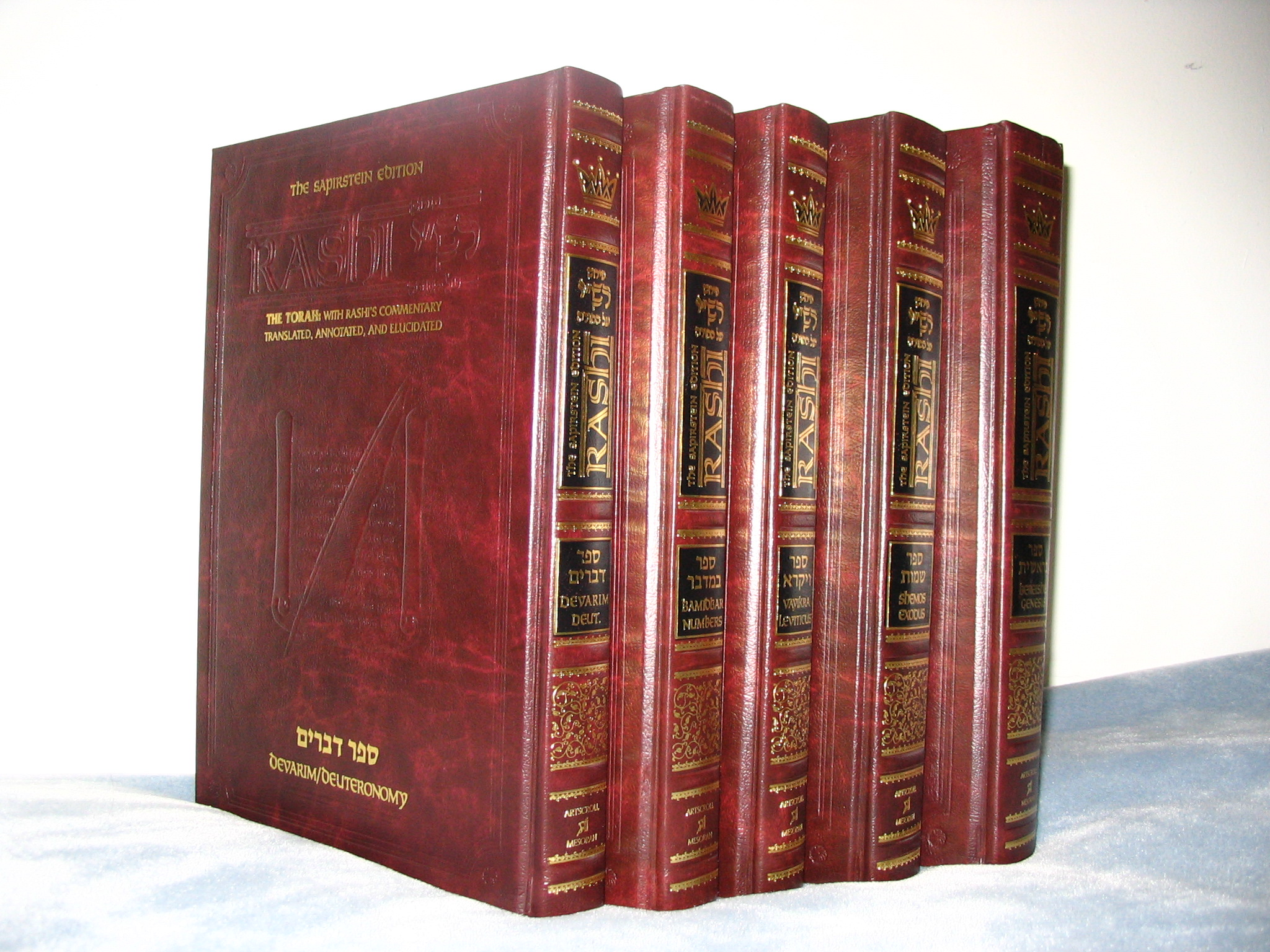
A modern translation of Rashi's commentary on the Chumash, published by Artscroll

Rashi's commentary on the Tanakh—and especially his commentary on the Chumash—is the essential companion for any study of the Bible among Orthodox Jews. Drawing on the breadth of Midrashic, Talmudic and Aggadic literature (including literature that is no longer extant), as well as his knowledge of Hebrew grammar and halakhah, Rashi clarifies the "simple" meaning of the text so that a bright child of five could understand it. At the same time, his commentary forms the foundation for some of the most profound legal analysis and mystical discourses that came after it. Scholars debate why Rashi chose a particular Midrash to illustrate a point, or why he used certain words and phrases and not others. Shneur Zalman of Liadi wrote that "Rashi's commentary on Torah is the 'wine of Torah'. It opens the heart and uncovers one's essential love and fear of G-d." There are hints to mystical sources within Rashi's commentary, particularly within his comments on the Creation account.

Scholars believe that Rashi's commentary on the Torah grew out of the lectures he gave to his students in his yeshiva, and evolved with the questions and answers they raised on it. Rashi completed this commentary only in the last years of his life. It was immediately accepted as authoritative by all Jewish communities, Ashkenazi and Sephardi alike.

The first dated Hebrew printed book was Rashi's commentary on the Chumash, printed by Abraham ben Garton in Reggio di Calabria, Italy, 18 February 1475. (This version did not include the text of the Chumash itself.)

Rashi wrote commentaries on all the books of Tanakh except Chronicles I & II, and Ezra–Nehemiah. His commentary to Job is incomplete, ending at 40:25.

A main characteristic of Rashi's writing was his focus on grammar and syntax. His primary focus was on word choice, and "essentially [he acts] as a dictionary where he defines unusual Hebrew words." He searches for things that may not be clear to the reader and offers clarification on the inconsistency that may be present. Rashi does so by "filling in missing information that [helps] lead to a more complete understanding" of the Torah. A portion of his writing is dedicated to making distinctions between the peshat, or plain and literal meaning of the text, and the aggadah or rabbinic interpretation. Rashbam, one of Rashi's grandchildren, heavily critiqued his response on his "commentary on the Torah [being] based primarily on the classic midrashim (rabbinic homilies)."

Rashi himself explained his method as utilizing both peshat and derash: "I, however, am only concerned with the plain sense of Scripture (peshuto shel mikra) and with such Agadoth that explain the words of Scripture in a manner that fits in with them." In one place, he quotes a midrash and then states "But this midrash cannot be reconciled with Scripture for several reasons... Therefore I say: let scripture be reconciled according to its simple meaning, clearly, and the midrash may also be expounded, as is said: 'Is not My word... like a hammer which shatters the rock?' - it is divided into many fragments."

=== Commentary on the Talmud ===
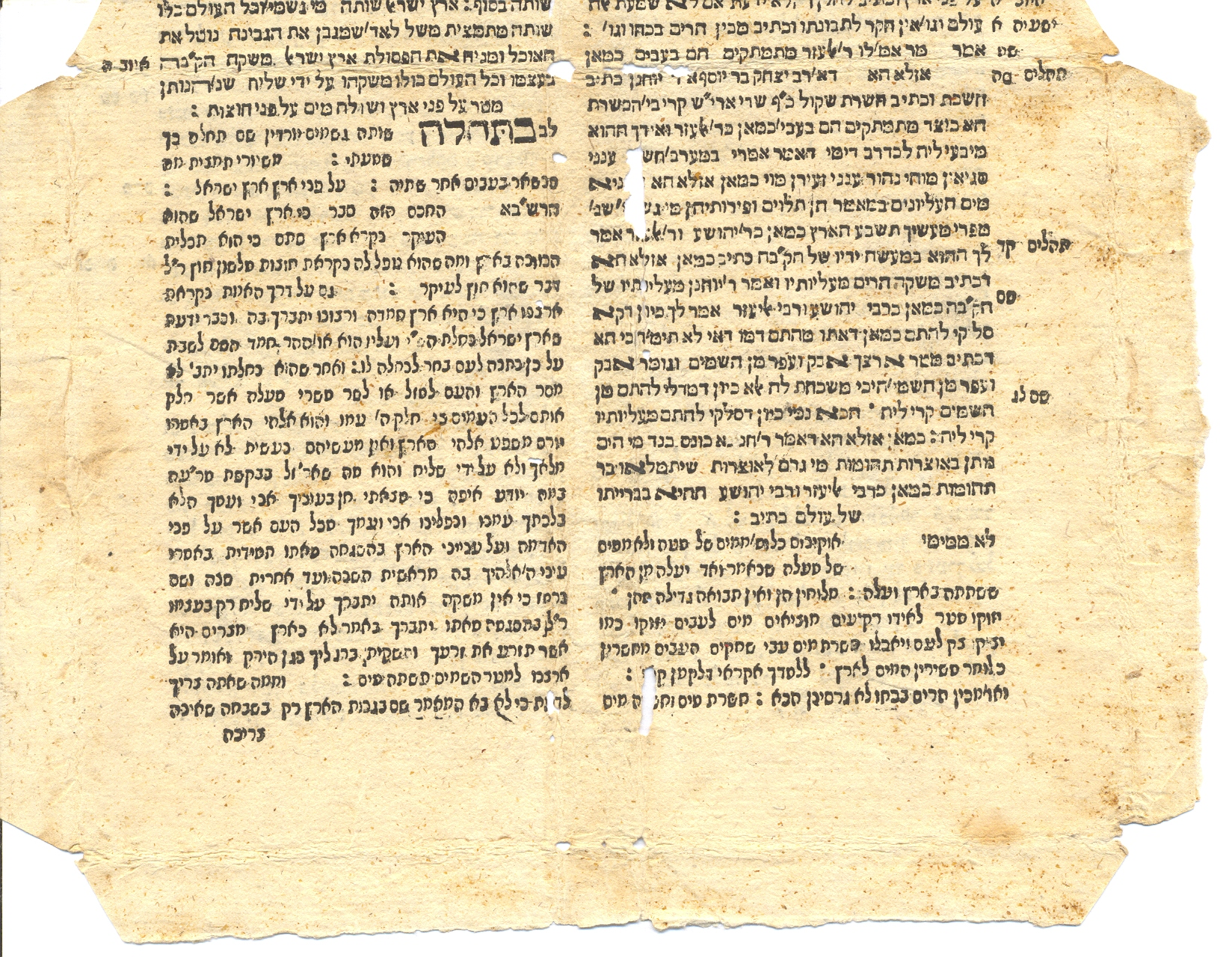
An early printing of the Talmud (Ta'anit 9b); Rashi's commentary is at the bottom of the right column, continuing for a few lines into the left column. [Note: According to R' Zvi Chajes, the "Rashi" commentary on Ta'anit was not written by Rashi]

Rashi wrote the first comprehensive commentary on the Talmud, covering nearly all of the Babylonian Talmud (a total of 30 out of 39 tractates, due to his death). The commentary, drawing on his knowledge of the entire contents of the Talmud, attempts to provide a full explanation of the words and of the logical structure of each Talmudic passage. Unlike other commentators, Rashi does not paraphrase or exclude any part of the text, but elucidates phrase by phrase. Often he provides punctuation in the unpunctuated text, explaining, for example, "This is a question"; "He says this in surprise", "He repeats this in agreement", etc.

As in his commentary on the Tanakh, Rashi frequently illustrates the meaning of the text using analogies to the professions, crafts, and sports of his day. He also translates difficult Hebrew or Aramaic words into the spoken French language of his day, giving latter-day scholars a window into the vocabulary and pronunciation of Old French.

Rashi's Talmud commentary spread quickly, reaching Jews as far as Yemen by mid-12th century. It has been included in every version of the Talmud since its first printing in the fifteenth century. It is always situated towards the middle of the opened book display; i.e., on the side of the page closest to the binding.

Some of the other printed commentaries which are attributed to Rashi were composed by others, primarily his students. Akiva Eger stated that the commentary on Nazir was not in fact by Rashi, while Zvi Hirsch Chajes stated that the commentary on Taanit was not by Rashi. In some editions of the Talmud, the text indicates that Rashi died before completing the tractate, and that it was completed by a student. This is true of Makkot (the end of which was composed by his son-in-law, Judah ben Nathan), and of Bava Batra (finished, in a more detailed style, by his grandson the Rashbam). The commentary attributed to Rashi on Horayot was thought by some to have been written by Judah ben Nathan, but evidence was uncovered indicating that the commentary on Horayot was from the school of Gershom ben Judah. There is a legend that the commentary on Nedarim, which is clearly not his, was actually composed by his daughters. Another legend states that Rashi died while writing a commentary on Talmud, and that the very last word he wrote was 'tahor,' which means pure in Hebrew - indicating that his soul was pure as it left his body.

=== Responsa ===
About 300 of Rashi's responsa and halakhic decisions are extant. Although some may find contradictory to Rashi's intended purpose for his writings, these responsa were copied, preserved, and published by his students, grandchildren, and other future scholars. Siddur Rashi, compiled by an unknown student, also contains Rashi's responsa on prayer. Many other rulings and responsa are recorded in Mahzor Vitry. Other compilations include Sefer Hapardes, probably edited by Shemaiah of Troyes, (Note: Also often attributed to Samuel of Bamberg; see H. L. Erenreich, Sepher ha-Pardes pg. 14.) Rashi's student, and Sefer Haorah, prepared by Nathan Hamachiri.

Rashi's writing is placed under the category of post-Talmudic, for its explanation and elaboration on the Talmud; however, he not only wrote about the meaning of Biblical and Talmudic passages, but also on liturgical texts, syntax rules, and cases regarding new religions emerging. Some say that his responsa allows people to obtain "clear pictures of his personality," and shows Rashi as a kind, gentle, humble, and liberal man. They also illustrate his intelligence and common sense.

Rashi's responsa not only addressed some of the different cases and questions regarding Jewish life and law, but it shed light into the historical and social conditions which the Jews were under during the First Crusade. He covered the following topics and themes in his responsa: linguistic focus on texts, law related to prayer, food, and the Sabbath, wine produced by non-Jews, oaths and excommunications, sales, partnerships, loans and interest, bails, communal affairs, and civil law. Rashi's responsa can be broken down into three genres: questions by contemporary sages and students regarding the Torah, the law, and other compilations.

For example, in his writing regarding relations with the Christians, he provides a guide for how one should behave when dealing with martyrs and converts, as well as the "insults and terms of [disgrace] aimed at the Jews." Stemming from the aftermath of the Crusades, Rashi wrote concerning those who were forced to convert, and the rights women had when their husbands were killed.

Rashi focused the majority of his responsa, if not all, on a "meticulous analysis of the language of the text".

=== Poetry ===
Rashi wrote several selichot (penitential prayers), some of which are still recited today as part of the Jewish liturgy. These include:

- Nora va'Elyonim, which is recited by Ashkenazi Jews on the eve of Rosh Hashanah. Historically it was also recited on the eve of Yom Kippur.
- Ophan Echad ba'Aretz
- Az Terem Nimtechu, which is recited by Ashkenazim on the Fast of Gedaliah.
- Akh Leilohim Nafshi Domi
- Apekha Hashev
- Torah haTemimah, apparently about the Rhineland massacres.
- Tefillah l'Kademkha, which was included in the 1613 prayerbook of the Old Synagogue of Prague.

Other poems are sometimes falsely attributed to Rashi. The above list is probably not exhaustive, but no evidence exists to connect Rashi to other poems.

== Assessment and legacy ==
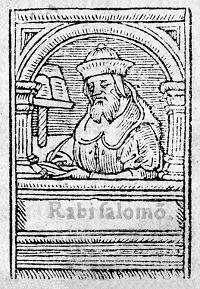
A woodcut of Rashi that appeared in a printing of Postillae maiores totius anni cum glossis & quaestionibus by Guillaume de Parisiensis (William of Paris), published in Lyon in 1539

Rashi was one of the first authors to write in Old French (the language he spoke in everyday life, which he used alongside Hebrew), as most contemporary French authors instead wrote in Latin. As a consequence, besides its religious value, his work is valued for the insight it gives into the language and culture of Northern France in the 11th century. His commentaries on the Tanakh—especially his commentary on the Chumash (the "Five Books of Moses")—serves as the basis of more than 300 "supercommentaries" which analyze Rashi's choice of language and citations, penned by some of the greatest names in rabbinic literature. Rashi was also the primary subject of Romanian-born American writer and political activist Elie Wiesel's 2009 biography entitled Rashi: A Portrait.

=== Commentary on the Tanakh ===
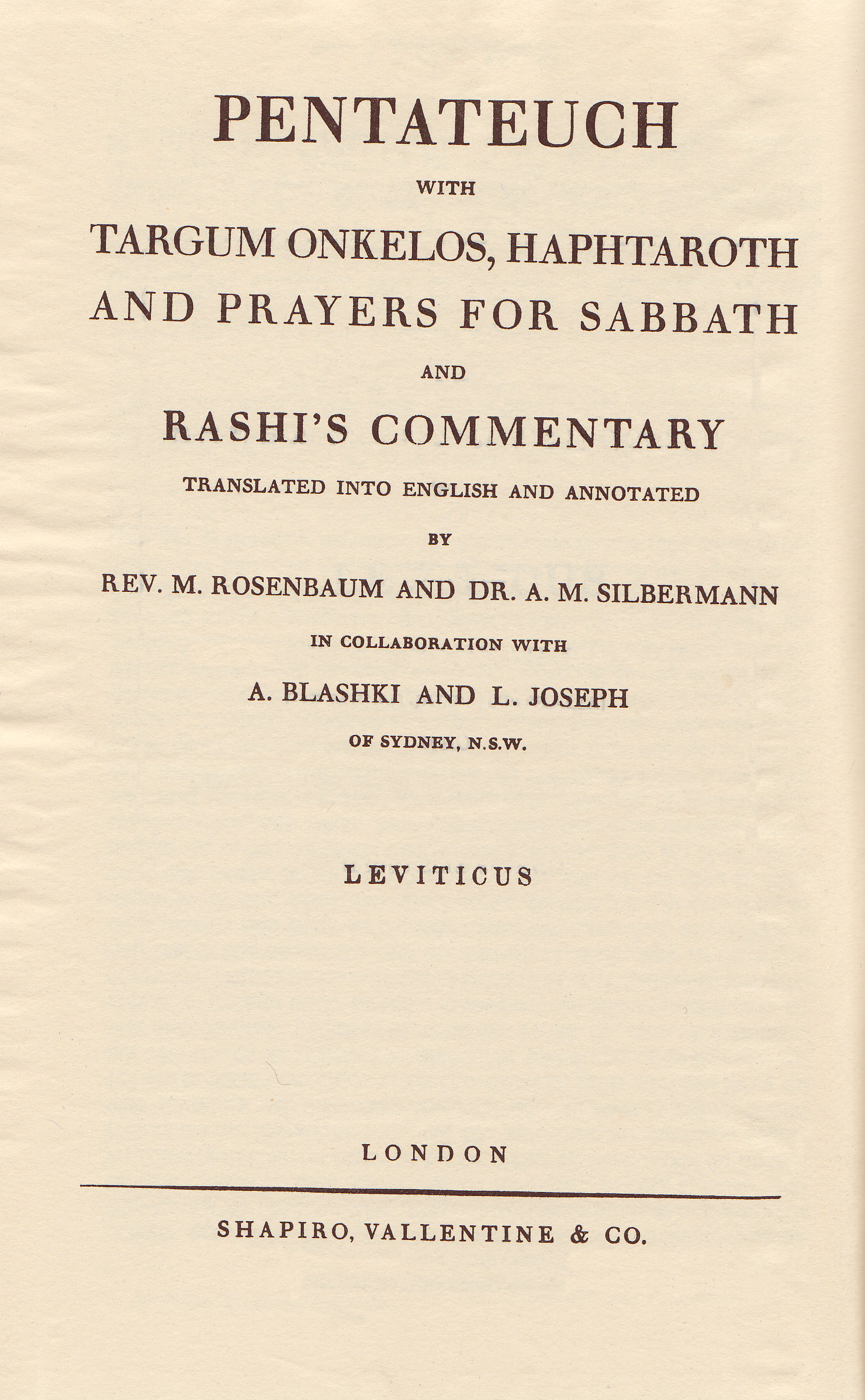
Title page of an English translation of Rashi's Commentary on the Pentateuch.

Tens of thousands of men, women and children study "Chumash with Rashi" as they review the Torah portion to be read in synagogue on the upcoming Shabbat. According to halakha, a man may even fulfill of the requirement of Shnayim mikra ve-echad targum by reading Rashi's commentary rather than the standard Targum Onkelos. Since its publication, Rashi's commentary on the Torah is standard in almost all Chumashim produced within the Orthodox Jewish community. Many people who study Rashi along with Tanakh use the term "Chumash with Rashi".

Mordechai Leifer of Nadvorna said that anyone who learns the weekly Parsha together with the commentary by Rashi every week is guaranteed to sit in the Yeshiva (school) of Rashi in the Afterlife.

Voluminous supercommentaries have been published on Rashi's Bible commentaries, including Gur Aryeh by Judah Loew (the Maharal), Sefer ha-Mizrachi by Elijah Mizrachi (the Re'em), and Yeri'ot Shlomo by Solomon Luria (the Maharshal). Menachem Mendel Schneerson, in his Rashi Sichos, often addresses several of these commentaries at once. The growth of intensive scholary interest in Rashi's commentary, the rise of supercommentaries, and what has been called the 'canonisation' of Rashi, has meant his literary reception and legacy in Jewish circles has been immense and long-standing.

Rashi's influence grew the most in the 15th century; from the 17th century onwards, his commentaries were translated into many other languages. Rashi's commentary on the Pentateuch was known as the first printed Hebrew work. English translations include those of Rosenbaum and Silbermann and ArtScroll.

=== Commentary on the Talmud ===
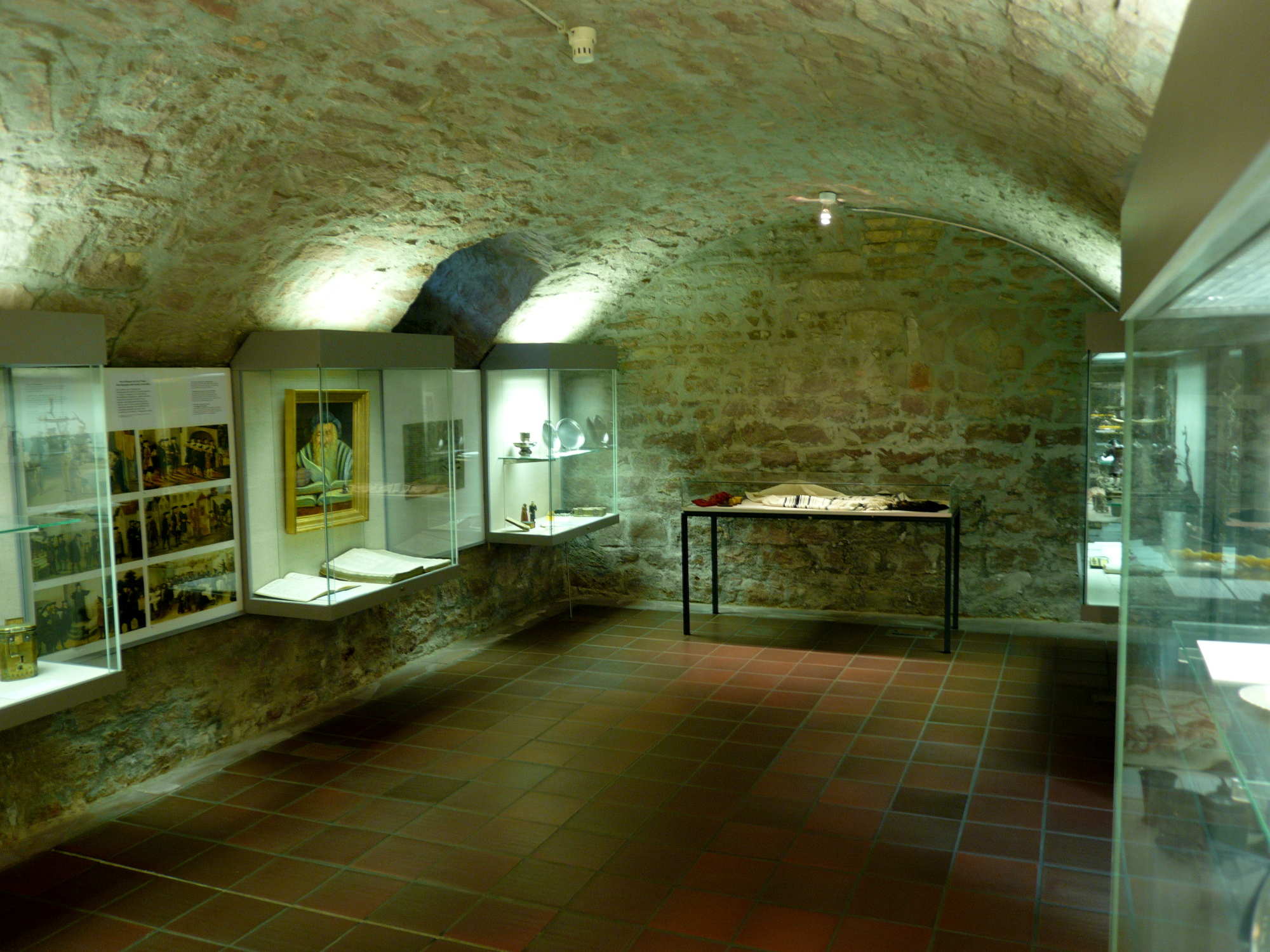
Raschihaus, Jewish Museum, Worms, Germany.

Rashi's commentary on the Talmud continues to be a key basis for contemporary rabbinic scholarship and interpretation. Without Rashi's commentary, the Talmud would have remained a closed book.

Rashi's commentary had a profound influence on subsequent Talmud study and scholarship:

The commentaries of Rashi democratized talmudic scholarship. Prior to his work, the only way to master a tractate was to travel to a talmudic academy and study at the feet of a master. No written work could systematically convey with any degree of sustained accuracy the precise line of a talmudic argument... With the appearance of Rashi’s work, anyone, regardless of means, could by dint of talent and effort master any talmudic topic. It further expanded the range of knowledge of most scholars. Previously, one knew accurately only what one had been fortunate to study at an academy... The lifelong study of Talmud, the constant conquest of new tractates, and the unlimited personal acquisition of knowledge was in many ways the consequence of Rashi’s inimitable work of exposition.

The presence of Rashi's commentary also changed the nature of subsequent Talmud commentaries:

This is not to say that Rashi’s explanations were definitive. Far from it. For some three hundred years scholars scrutinized his commentary, criticized innumerable passages, and demanded their reinterpretation. Yet, all realized that the problem that had confronted scholars for close to half a millennium—how to turn the abrupt and sometimes gnomic formulations of the Talmud into a coherent and smoothly flowing text—had been solved definitively by Rashi. The subsequent task of scholars, therefore, was to emend and add to his interpretations.

In general, Rashi's commentary provides the peshat or literal meaning of the Talmud, while subsequent commentaries such as the Tosafot often go beyond the passage itself in terms of arguments, parallels, and distinctions that could be drawn out. This addition to Jewish texts was seen as causing a "major cultural product" which became an important part of Torah study. In the standard printed Talmud, the Tosafot's commentaries can be found in the Talmud opposite Rashi's commentary. The Tosafot also added comments and criticism in places where Rashi had not added comments.

Rashi also exerted a decisive influence on establishing the correct text of the Talmud. Up to and including his age, texts of each Talmudic tractate were copied by hand and circulated in yeshivas. Errors often crept in: sometimes a copyist would switch words around, and other times incorporate a student's marginal notes into the main text. Because of the large number of merchant-scholars who came from throughout the Jewish world to attend the great fairs in Troyes, Rashi was able to compare different manuscripts and readings in Tosefta, Jerusalem Talmud, Midrash, Targum, and the writings of the Geonim, and determine which readings should be preferred. However, in his humility, he deferred to scholars who disagreed with him. For example, in Chulin 4a, he comments about a phrase, "We do not read this. But as for those who do, this is the explanation..."

=== Influence in non-Jewish circles ===
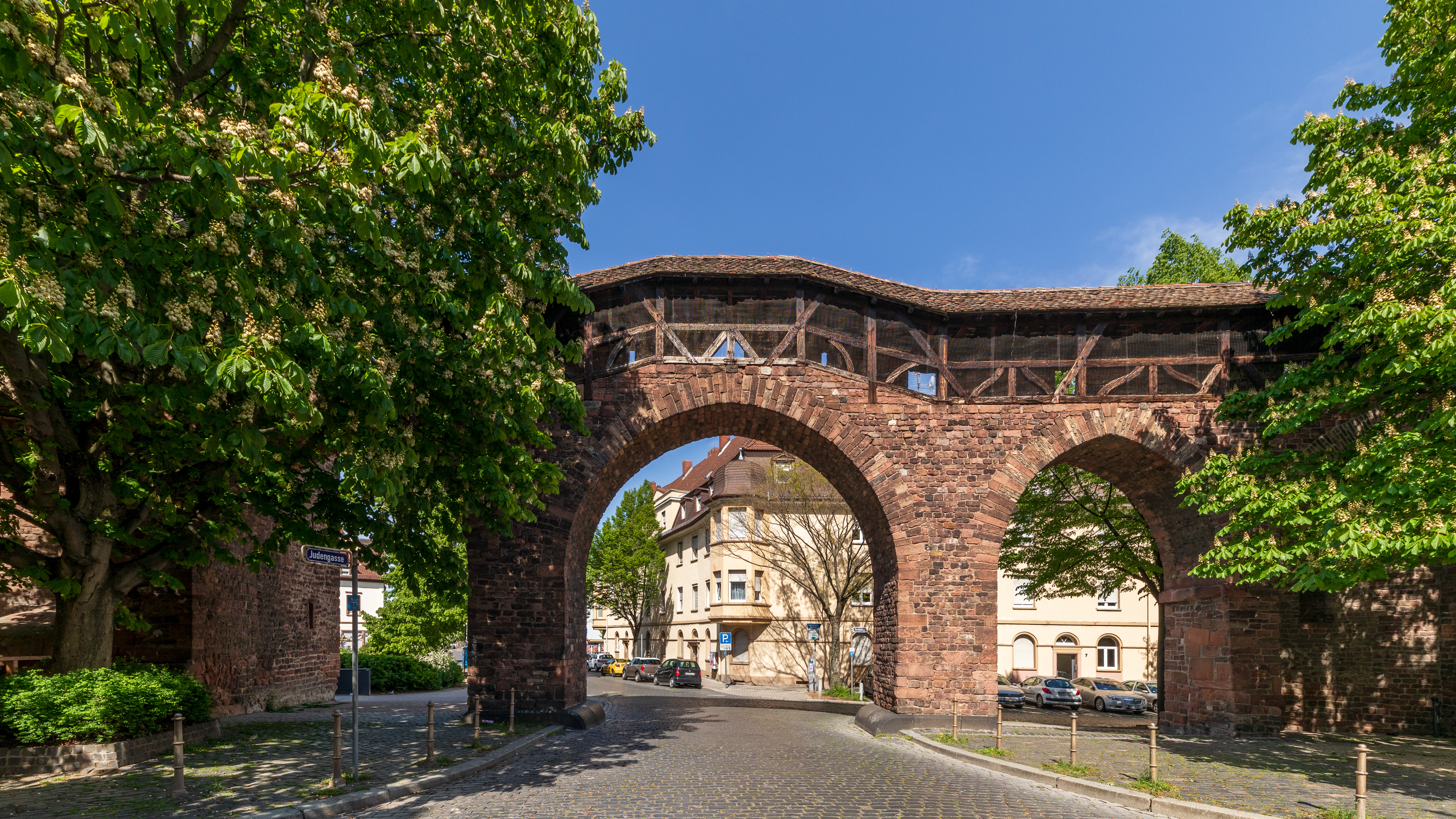
The Rashi Gate in the city fortifications of Worms

Rashi's commentaries on the Bible, especially those on the Pentateuch, circulated in many different communities. In the 12th–17th centuries, Rashi's influence spread from French and German provinces to Spain and the east. He had a tremendous influence on Christian scholars. The French monk Nicholas de Lyra, who was known as the "ape of Rashi", relied on Rashi's commentary when writing his Postillae Perpetuate, one of the primary sources used in Luther's translation of the Bible. He believed that Rashi's commentaries were the "official repository of Rabbinical tradition" and significant to understanding the Bible. Rashi's commentaries became significant to humanists at this time who studied grammar and exegesis. Christian Hebraists studied Rashi's commentaries as important interpretations "authorized by the Synagogue".

Although Rashi had an influence on communities outside of Judaism, his lack of connection to science prevented him from entering the general domain, and he remained more popular among the Jewish community.

In his book Demystifying Islam, Islamic author Harris Zafar cites Rashi for the view that the Song of Songs is not an erotic poem narrated by a man about a woman, but is instead a poem narrated by God about the people of Israel, a point of importance to Muslims because of their belief, which Zafar summarizes, that the Song of Songs, at Chapter 5, Verse 16, mentions Muhammad by name, a supposition that might be problematic if the mention were in an erotic context.

== "Rashi script" ==
The complete Hebrew alphabet in Rashi script [right to left].

The semi-cursive typeface in which Rashi's commentaries are printed both in the Talmud and Tanakh is often referred to as "Rashi script." Despite the name, Rashi himself did not use such a script: the typeface is based on a 15th-century Sephardic semi-cursive hand, postdating Rashi's death by several hundred years. Early Hebrew typographers such as the Soncino family and Daniel Bomberg employed in their editions of commented texts (such as the Mikraot Gedolot and the Talmud, in which Rashi's commentaries prominently figure) what would become called "Rashi script" to distinguish the rabbinic commentary from the primary text proper, for which they used a square typeface.
