= Rashbam =

French rabbi

- Born: c. 1085; Troyes
- Died: c. 1158

Philosophical work
- Era: Medieval philosophy
- Region: Jewish philosophy

Samuel ben Meir (Troyes, c. 1085 – c. 1158), after his death known as the "Rashbam", a Hebrew acronym for RAbbi SHmuel Ben Meir, was a leading French Tosafist and grandson of Shlomo Yitzhaki, "Rashi".

== Biography ==
He was born in the vicinity of Troyes, in around 1085 in France to his father Meir ben Shmuel and mother Yocheved, daughter of Rashi. He was the older brother of Solomon the grammarian as well as of the Tosafists Isaac ben Meir (the "Rivam") and Jacob ben Meir ("Rabbeinu Tam"), and a colleague of Rabbi Joseph Kara.

Like his maternal grandfather, the Rashbam was a biblical commentator and Talmudist. He learned from Rashi and from Isaac ben Asher ha-Levi ("Riva"). He was the teacher of his brother, Rabbeinu Tam, and his method of interpretation differed from that of his grandfather.

Rashbam earned a living by tending livestock and growing grapes, following in his family tradition. Known for his piety, he defended Jewish beliefs in public disputes that had been arranged by church leaders to demonstrate the inferiority of Judaism, and his commentary contains several direct references to such disputes with the clergy especially concerning the mistranslation of biblical terms which leads to misunderstandings.

Few details of Rashbam's life are known. He is said to have been so modest that he always walked with downcast eyes. Mordecai ben Hillel says that he was so absent-minded that once, while traveling, he almost climbed into a wagon loaded with cattle. It is also known that around 1150, he taught in Rouen (Hebrew רדום - Rodom, capital city of Plantagenet Normandy Duchy) at the Yeshiva whose remains were discovered in 1976. There, he probably met the great Spanish Scholar Avraham Ibn Ezra, who stayed in Rouen between 1150 and 1158.

In or around 1160, a synod was held in Troyes as part of the Takkanot Shum. This synod was led by the Rashbam, his brother, Rabbeinu Tam, and Eliezer ben Nathan (the Ra'avan). Over 250 rabbis from communities all over France attended as well. A number of communal decrees were enacted at the synod covering both Jewish-Gentile relations as well as matters relating internally to the Jewish community.

Rashi family tree

Isaac Hatzarfati
Samuel	Rashi
Meir	Jochebed	Rachel	Eliezer	Miriam	Judah ben Nathan
Samuel ben Meir	Rabbeinu Tam	Miriam	Samson ben Yosef	Rivam	Solomon ben Meir	Miriam	Samuel of Vitry	Yom Tov	Eliezer?
Isaac	Joseph	Solomon	Abraham of Sens	Judah ben Yom Tov	Joseph
Isaac ben Samuel
Isaac of Dampierre	Samson ben Abraham	Isaac
Rabbeinu Elhanan
Rabbi Jacob	Judah ben Isaac Messer Leon
Samuel ben Elhanan
Samuel of Acre

Notes:
- Rashi's daughters

== Teachings ==
=== Torah commentary ===
His commentary on the Torah is renowned for its stress on the plain meaning (peshat) of the text. He adopted a natural (as distinct from a homiletical and traditional) method. This approach often led him to state views that were somewhat controversial. Thus Rashbam (on Genesis 1:5) maintained that the day began at dawn and not from the previous sunset (as later Jewish custom assumed). Another famous interpretation was Rashbam's view that the much disputed phrase in Genesis 49:10 must be rendered "Until he cometh to Shiloh," and refers to the division of the kingdom of Judah after Solomon's death.

Rashbam explains his aim in Biblical exegesis thus: "Those who love pure reason should always remember that the sages have said a Biblical passage must not be deprived of its original meaning [on Genesis 37:2]. Yet as a consequence of the opinion expressed by them, that the constant study of the Talmud is one of the most laudable pursuits, commentators have been unable, by reason of such study, to expound individual verses according to their obvious meaning. Even my grandfather Solomon was an adherent of this school; and I had an argument with him on that account, in which he admitted that he would revise his commentaries if he had time to do so."

Several scholars feel that the reason his commentary on Genesis was missing for a long time and not fully recovered until the late 1800s had to do with controversial remarks regarding when the day begins. Even today, not all versions of Mikraot Gedolot include a complete Rashbam.

=== Talmudic works ===
Portions of his commentary on the Talmud have been preserved, such as on the tractate Bava Batra (on large portions of the tractate where no commentary by Rashi is available), as well as the last chapter of tractate Pesachim. Rashbam's notes on the Bible are remarkable for brevity. He wrote two versions of his commentary on parts of the Bavli (Babylonian) Talmud, a long version and a short version. Generally, only his long version has been published, although the shorter version has sometimes been published in part.

Rashbam's Talmudical works include the following commentaries:

- On the treatise Baba Batra (iii. 29a to the end).
- On Pesaḥim (x. 99b to the end).
- On Avodah Zarah, of which only a few passages are quoted in "Temim De'im," ed. Venice, iii. 19b, 20b, 28c.
- On Niddah, as appears from the "Or Zarua'" (Berliner's "Magazin," i. 100a).
- Additions to Alfasi (Ahaba, ed. Amsterdam, i. 136b).
- Additions to Rashi's commentary
- "Teshuvot," in R. Eliezer b. Nathan's "Eben ha-'Ezer," ed. Prague, 143b-146c, and in the "Pardes," ed. Constantinople, fol. 4a (Berliner's "Magazin," 1876, p. 60; "Or Zarua'," i. 79b; "Mordekai" on Ket. viii. 300, fol. 108b, in "Haggahot Maimuniyyot," "Ishot," iii.).
- On Pirkei Avot Additions of his to Pirkei Avot are found also in Migdal Oz by Shem Tov ben Abraham ibn Gaon.
- The conclusions of the commentaries on the Talmud left incomplete by Rashi.

Other opinions of the Rashbam, which aren't found in his currently extant writings, are commonly quoted by tosafot throughout the Talmud.

== Related books and papers ==
- Japhet, Sara; Salters, Robert B. (1985). The Commentary of R. Samuel ben Meir, Rashbam, on Qoheleth. Jerusalem: Magnes Press, Hebrew University. ISBN 965-223-517-2. OCLC 12685924.
- Lockshin, Martin I. (1989). Rabbi Samuel ben Meir's Commentary on Genesis: An Annotated Translation. Lewiston, NY, USA: E. Mellen Press. ISBN 0-88946-256-9. OCLC 19740503.
- Lockshin, Martin I. (2001). Rashbam's Commentary on Exodus: An Annotated Translation. Atlanta, Ga.: Scholars Press. ISBN 1-930675-11-9. OCLC 634886463.
- Golb, Norman (1998). The Jews in Medieval Normandy: A Social and Intellectual History. New York: Cambridge University Press. ISBN 0-521-58032-3. OCLC 36461619.
- Viezel, Eran (2008). "'The Anxiety of Influence': Rashbam's Approach to Rashi's Commentary on the Torah". AJS Review. 98 (3). Project Muse: 279–303. doi:10.1017/s0364009416000428. ISSN 0364-0094. S2CID 164824867.
- Cohen, Mordechai Z. (2016). "'Rashbam Scholarship in Perpetual Motion'". Jewish Quarterly Review. 40 (2). University of Pennsylvania Press: 389–408. doi:10.1353/jqr.0.0014. ISSN 0021-6682.

Rashbam wrote commentary to Bava Batra and Pesachim in Talmud Bavli.

== See also ==
- Jewish commentaries on the Bible
