= Rabbeinu Tam =

Twelfth-century French Ashkenazi rabbi, leading Tosafist, & leading halakhic authority

Rabbeinu Jacob ben Meir Tam
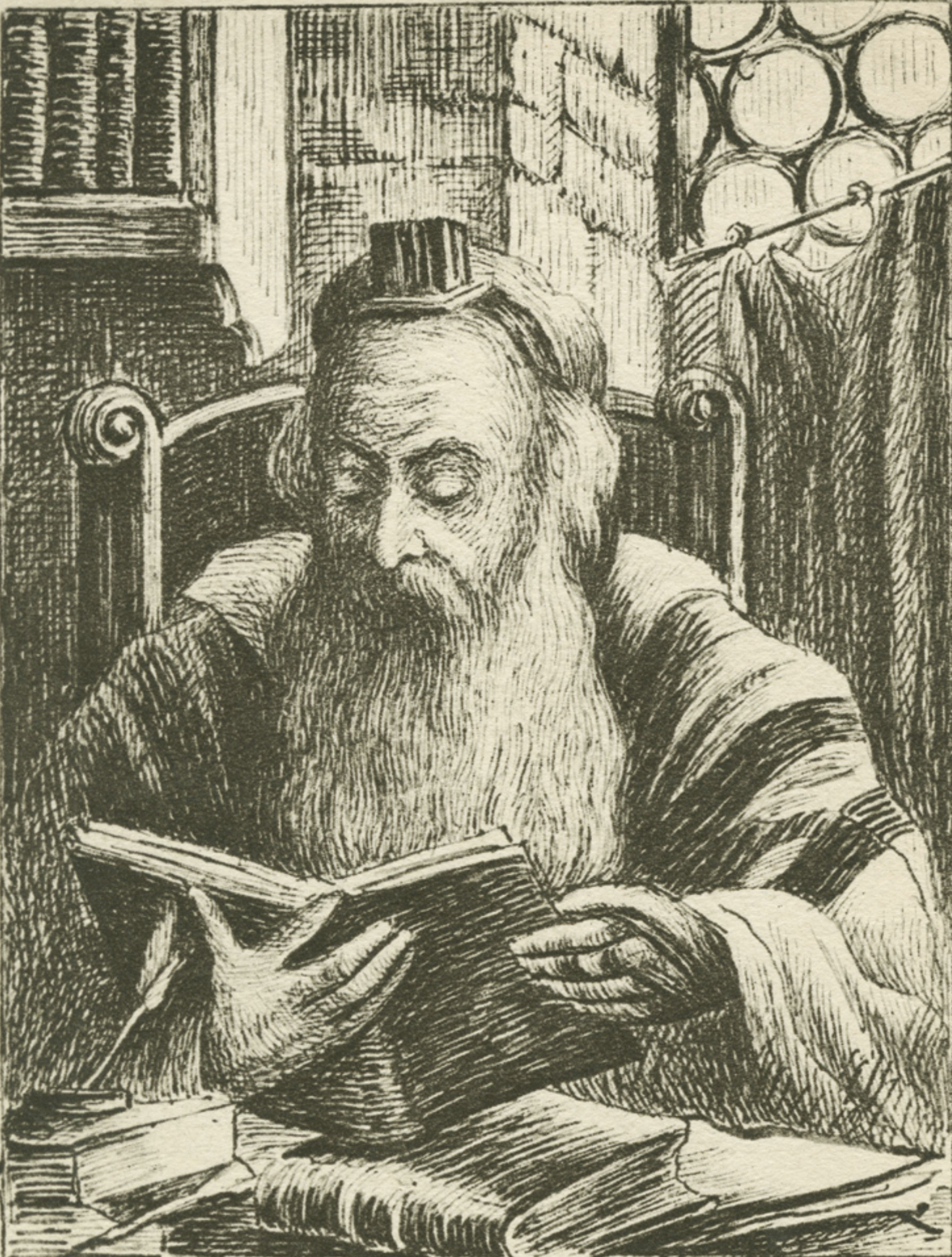
- Artistic depiction by Meir Kunstadt (c. 1900)
- Title: Rabbeinu Tam

Personal life
- Born: 1100 Ramerupt
- Died: June 9, 1171 (aged 70–71) Troyes
- Buried: Ramerupt
- Spouse: Miriam bat Yosef
- Parent(s): Meir ben Shmuel and Yocheved bat Shlomo

Religious life
- Religion: Judaism

Jacob ben Meir (1100 – 9 June 1171 [4 Tammuz]), best known as Rabbeinu Tam (Hebrew: רבינו תם), was a renowned Ashkenazi Jewish rabbi, one of the French Tosafists, a leading authority on Halakha, and a grandson of Rashi. Known as Rabbeinu ('our teacher'), he acquired the Hebrew suffix "Tam" ('straightforward'); it was originally used in the Book of Genesis to describe his biblical namesake, Jacob.

== Biography ==
Jacob ben Meir was born in the French country village of Ramerupt, now in Aube in northern-central France, to Meir ben Samuel and Yokheved, daughter of Rashi. His primary teachers were his father,and his brother Samuel ben Meir, known as Rashbam. His other brothers were Isaac, known as the Rivam, and Solomon the Grammarian. He married Miriam, the sister of Shimshon ben Yosef of Falaise, Calvados, who may have been his second wife.

His reputation as a legal scholar spread far beyond France. Abraham ibn Daud of the Taifa of Córdoba, a chronicler of the sages, mentioned Rabbeinu Tam in his Sefer ha-Qabbalah (but not Rashi). The Italian Mishnaic exegete Isaac ben Melchizedek of Siponto, maintained a written correspondence with Rabbeinu Tam. Rabbeinu Tam's work is also cited by Zerachiah ha-Levi of Girona, a Catalonian critic living in Lunel, Provence. He maintained a scholarly correspondence with Aaron ben Joseph of Beaugency and received questions from students throughout France and from the Italian communities of Bari and Otranto.

Rabbeinu Tam gave his Beth Din the title of "the generation's [most] significant court", and indeed, he is known for communal enactments improving Jewish family life, education, and women's status. At times, he criticised halakhic opponents, notably in his controversies with Meshullam of Melun and Efraim of Regensburg.

In or around 1160, a synod was held in Troyes as part of the Takkanot Shum. This synod was led by Rabbeinu Tam, his brother and his father, and Eliezer ben Nathan. Over 250 hakhams from communities all over France attended as well. Several communal decrees were enacted at the synod covering both Jewish-Gentile relations as well as matters relating internally to the Jewish community.

According to the chronicler Ephraim of Bonn, during the Second Crusade in 1146 (or 1147), Rabbeinu Tam was the victim of a violent assault in Ramerupt by a passing mob of Crusaders. On the second day of Shavuot, the Crusaders burst into his home, looted his property, and destroyed a Torah scroll in his presence. He was dragged into a field and stabbed five times in the head, an act the attackers claimed was retribution for the five wounds of Jesus. His life was saved only by the intervention of a passing nobleman who knew him; the nobleman persuaded the mob to let him take custody of the rabbi under the false pretense of converting him, allowing Rabbeinu Tam to escape to Troyes. While traditionally identified as Ramerupt, some modern historians like Norman Golb argue the attack actually occurred in Reims..

Rashi family tree

Isaac Hatzarfati
Samuel	Rashi
Meir	Jochebed	Rachel	Eliezer	Miriam	Judah ben Nathan
Samuel ben Meir	Rabbeinu Tam	Miriam	Samson ben Yosef	Rivam	Solomon ben Meir	Miriam	Samuel of Vitry	Yom Tov	Eliezer?
Isaac	Joseph	Solomon	Abraham of Sens	Judah ben Yom Tov	Joseph
Isaac ben Samuel
Isaac of Dampierre	Samson ben Abraham	Isaac
Rabbeinu Elhanan
Rabbi Jacob	Judah ben Isaac Messer Leon
Samuel ben Elhanan
Samuel of Acre

Notes:
- Rashi's daughters

== Halakhic disputes ==
=== Phylacteries ===
Legend has it that when Rashi was holding his infant grandson, the baby touched the tefillin on Rashi's head, and Rashi predicted that this grandson would later disagree with him about the order of the scripts that are put in the head tefillin. Rabbeinu Tam did disagree with Rashi and today, both "Rashi tefillin" and "Rabbeinu Tam tefillin" are produced: the Shulchan Aruch requires wearing Rashi's version and recommends that Jews wear both to satisfy both halakhic opinions.

It is worth noting that the Shulchan Aruch ... rules that Rabbeinu Tam Tefillin should be worn only by one who is known to be a very pious person; the Mishnah Berurah ... explains that it is a sign of haughtiness for anyone else to do this because the accepted practice is to wear Rashi Tefillin.

However, the Sephardic custom also followed in Hasidic Judaism is to wear Rabbeinu Tam's tefillin in addition to wearing Rashi's following the opinions presented in the Shulchan Aruch and its extensive commentaries authored throughout the early modern era and after. The rise and articulation of Hasidic Judaism has conflated the kabbalistic and halakhic aspects of Rabbeinu Tam's position, popularizing the custom to wear both pairs every day. Wearing Rabbeinu Tam tefillin is an almost universal custom among the many and diverse communities that follow the teachings of the Baal Shem Tov and his students.

=== Mezuzah ===
Another halakhic disagreement between Rabbeinu Tam and Rashi concerns the placement of the mezuzah. Rashi rules that it should be mounted on the doorpost in a vertical position; Rabbeinu Tam holds that it should be mounted horizontally. In a compromise solution, many Ashkenazi Jews place the mezuzah on the door in a slanted position. Sephardi Jews mount the mezuzah vertically, per the opinions of Rashi, Maimonides, and the Shulchan Aruch.

== Liturgical poet ==
Rabbenu Tam is significant to Hebrew poetry. The poetry of the Sefardim influenced him and is the chief representative of the transition period in Christian-ruled territory from the old payyeṭanic mode of expression to the more graceful forms of the Jews of al-Andalus. According to Zunz, he composed the following pieces for the synagogue: (1) several poems for the evening prayer of Sukkot and of Shemini Atzeret; (2) a hymn for the close of Sabbath on which a wedding is celebrated; (3) a hymn for the replacing of the Torah rolls in the Ark on Simchat Torah; (4) an "ofan" in four metric strophes; (5) four Aramaic reshut; (6) two selichot (Zunz reproduces the second in S.P. p. 248, in German verse). There was a synagogal poet named Jacob ben Meïr (Levi) who might easily have been confounded with the subject of this article, and therefore Tam's authorship of all of these poems is not above doubt.

The short poems which sometimes precede his responsa also show great poetic talent and a pure Hebrew style (see Bacher in Monatsschrift, xliv.56 et seq.). When Abraham ibn Ezra was traveling through France R. Tam greeted him in verse, whereupon Ibn Ezra exclaimed in astonishment: "Who has admitted the French into the temple of poetry?" (Kerem Ḥemed, vii.35). Another work of his in metric form is his poem on the accents, which contains forty-five strophes riming in; it is found in various libraries (Padua, Hamburg, Parma), and is entitled Maḥberet. Luzzatto has given the first four strophes in Kerem Ḥemed (vii.38), and Halberstam has printed the whole poem in Kobak's "Jeschurun" (v.123).

== Gravesite ==
Rabbeinu Tam and his brothers, the Rashbam and the Rivam and other Tosafists, were buried in Ramerupt. The unmarked ancient cemetery in which they are buried lies adjacent to a street called the "Street of the Great Cemetery". In 2005, Yisroel Meir Gabbai, a Breslover Hasid who renovates and repairs neglected gravesites of Jewish leaders around the world, helped to determine the exact boundaries of the cemetery. In addition, a member of the Jewish religious community in Paris bought a house at the site and converted it into a beth midrash.

== Works ==
Rabbeinu Tam's best known work is Sefer HaYashar, which contained both novellae and responsa, its primary purpose to resolve Talmudic textual problems without resorting to emendations of the received text. Even the best editions show considerable corruption of the original work, and all present editions of Sefer HaYashar are fragments collected from it. Responsa of Rabbeinu Jacob of Ramerupt (Hebrew) was published by Rabbi Yosef Kafih in 1968. Tam also authored a much-cited work of Biblical philology, Rulings of Rabbeinu Tam, in which he weighed in on the debates of Menahem b. Saruq and Dunash b. Labrat.
