= Simhah ben Samuel of Vitry =

11th century French rabbi

Simhah ben Samuel of Vitry (Hebrew: שמחה בן שמואל מויטרי; died 1105) was a French Talmudist of the 11th and 12th centuries, pupil of Rashi, and the compiler of Machzor Vitry. He lived in Vitry-en-Perthois.

== Machzor Vitry ==
Machzor Vitry contains decisions and rules concerning religious practise, besides responsa by Rashi and other authorities, both contemporary and earlier. The work is cited as early as the 12th century in Jacob Tam's Sefer ha-Yashar (No. 620) as having been compiled by Simchah; and the sources from which the compiler took his material—the Seder Rav Amram, the Halachot Gedolot, and others—also are mentioned. Isaac ben Samuel, a grandson of Simchah, also refers to Machzor Vitry compiled by his grandfather.

Various additions were afterward made to this machzor, a large proportion of which, designated by the letter ת' (= "tosafot"), are by Isaac ben Dorbolo. The latter often appends his name to such additions; and in one place he says plainly: "These explanations were added by me, Isaac b. Dorbolo; but the following is from the Machzor of R. Simchah of Vitry himself". Other additions are by Abraham ben Nathan, author of Ha-Manhig, and are designated by the letters אב"ן, his initials.

The Machzor Vitry includes the earliest known source for the recitation of "Next Year in Jerusalem" at the conclusion of the Yom Kippur service.

=== Extant manuscripts of the Machzor ===
Several manuscripts of Machzor Vitry are extant, the oldest of which, according to Abraham Berliner is from Isaac Samuel Reggio, currently in the Jewish Theological Seminary of America library (NY JTS 8092). It contains Machzor Vitry proper without any additions. A second manuscript, in the Bodleian Library, Oxford (Neubauer, Cat. Bodl. Hebr. MSS. No. 1100), is said to have marginal annotations by Eleazar ben Judah of Worms, author of the Sefer ha-Rokeach (Michael, Or ha-Chayim. No. 1214). The third manuscript is in the British Library (Cod. Add. Nos. 27,200 and 27,201), and contains still other additions; this manuscript served as basis for S. Hurwitz's edition of Machzor Vitry published by the Meḳiẓe Nirdamim Society (Berlin, 1893). The edition is very faulty, as the editor used no critical judgment in his work; instead of the original treatises it contains some from the Sefer ha-Terumah of Baruch ben Isaac and from the Eshkol of Ravad. A fourth manuscript is in Parma - Biblioteca Palatina Parm. 2574 (DeRossi cat. no. 159), which appears to be of similar age to the Reggio manuscript. Two recently published papers suggest that another manuscript (MS ex- Sassoon 535) is earlier (mid-12th century), and that there are in fact a corpus of thirteen extant Mahzor Vitry manuscripts.

The Klagsbald (MS ex-Sassoon 535), British Library (Cod. Add. Nos. 27,200 and 27,201), JTS (NY JTS 8092), Moscow (Guenzburg 481), and Paris (AIU H133) manuscripts are digitized and available online. The others are found in libraries.

=== Additions to the Machzor proper ===
Machzor Vitry contains many prayers and liturgical poems (piyyutim), which are distributed throughout the work. Besides these scattered poems the British Library manuscript has (pp. 239–260) a collection of piyyutim which was published by Brody under the title Kontres haPiyyutim. (Berlin, 1894). In the published edition of this Machzor there is also a commentary on the Pesach Haggadah, which, however, does not agree with that by R. Simchah b. Samuel of Vitry printed at Vilna in 1886. The latter commentary, which agrees with the one cited by Abudraham as being found in Machzor Vitry, was taken from a manuscript of that machzor—probably from the parchment copy owned by the Vilna Gaon, although no particular manuscript is mentioned in the Vilna edition itself.

The published edition of Machzor Vitry also contains a commentary on Pirkei Avot. This commentary is found in the British Library manuscript, but in neither of the others. It is really a commentary by Jacob ben Samson, the pupil of Rashi, amplified in the present Machzor. Many midrashic sayings, which are cited as such in Machzor Vitry, have been preserved in that work alone. Thus the passage cited (p. 332) from the Midrash Tehillim is no longer found in the present midrash of that name. Likewise there are found in Machzor Vitry citations from the Jerusalem Talmud which are lacking in the existing editions of the latter.

=== Editions ===
Machzor Vitry was published in 1891 by Mekitze Nirdamim. A new edition, based on Cod. Add. Nos. 27,200-27,201, Sassoon-Klagsbald 535, NY JTS 8092, Ginzberg 481, Bodleian 1100, Bodleian 1101, and Bodleian 1102 was published by Aryeh Goldschmidt between 2003 and 2009.

== Jewish Encyclopedia bibliography ==
- S. Hurwitz, Einleitung und Register zum Machzor Vitry, with additions by A. Berliner, Berlin, 1896–1897;
- A. Epstein, in Monatsschrift, 1897, pp. 306–307;
- idem, in R. E. J. 1897, pp. 308–313;
- Heimann, Michael Joseph (1891). Or ha-Ḥayyim. Frankfort-on-the-Main. No. 1214.
