= Rivam =

Isaac ben Meir (c. 1090 – c. 1130), also known as the Rivam after his Hebrew acronym, was a French rabbi and one of the Baalei Tosafos.

== Biography ==
He was born in the French country village of Ramerupt, in the Aube département of northern France to Meir ben Shmuel and Yocheved, the daughter of Rashi. He was the grandson of Rashi, and brother of the Rashbam and the Rabbeinu Tam. He died before his father, leaving seven children.

Although he died young, the Rivam contributed to Tosafot, mentioned by Eliezer ben Joel HaLevi, to several tractates of the Talmud. He is often quoted in the edited Tosafot.

Due to similar appellation, rabbi Isaac and the RiBaM are sometimes confused.
