= Langerwehe =

- Municipality
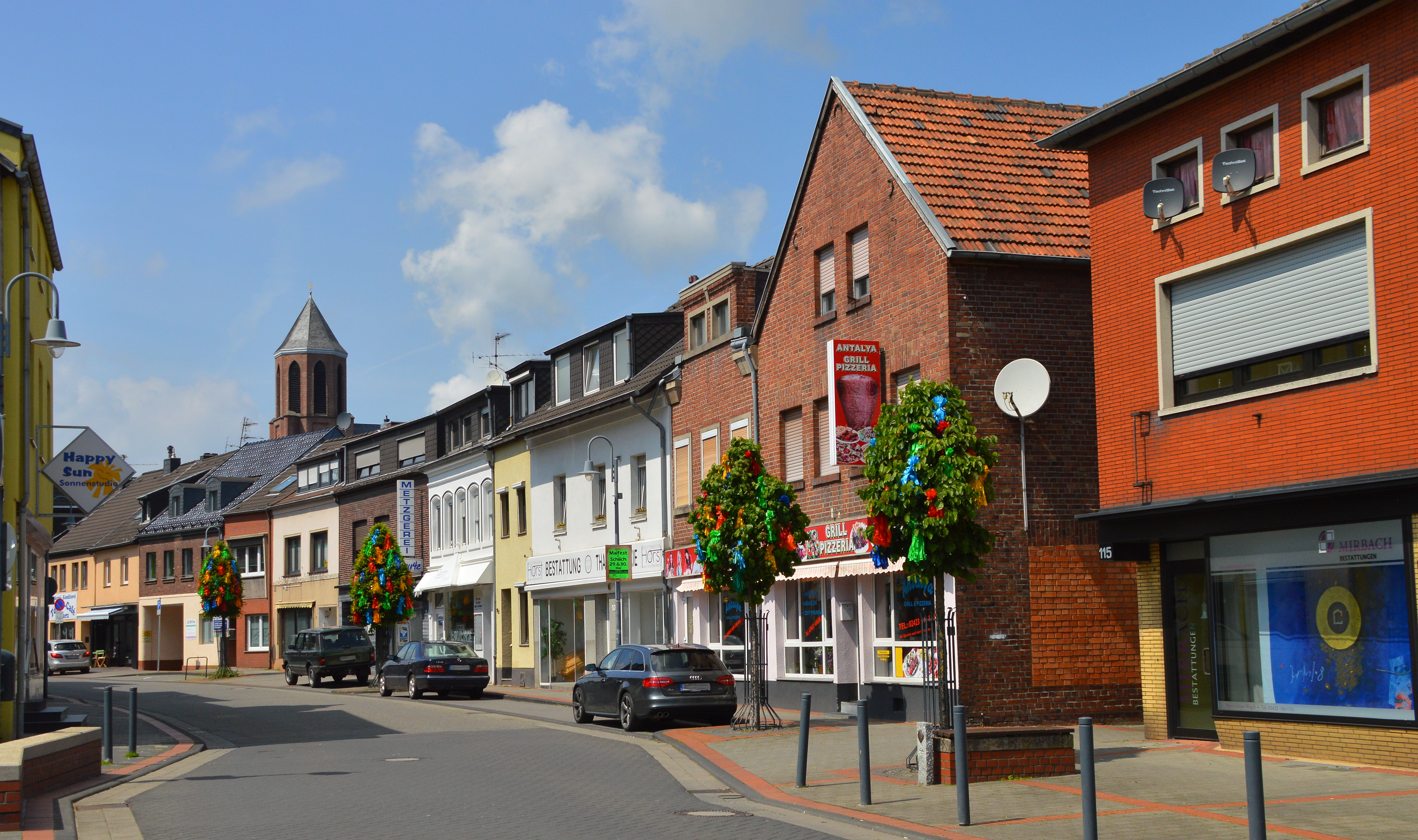
- Hauptstrasse

- Coat of arms

- Location of Langerwehe within Düren district
- Interactive map of Langerwehe
- Location within Germany Location within North Rhine-Westphalia
- Coordinates: 50°49′00″N 06°20′59″E
- Country: Germany
- State: North Rhine-Westphalia
- Admin. region: Köln
- District: Düren
- Subdivisions: 15

Government
  - Mayor (2025–30): Moritz Pelzer (CDU)

Area
  - Total: 41.49 km^{2} (16.02 sq mi)
- Elevation: 158 m (518 ft)

Population (2025-12-31)
  - Total: 14,960
  - Density: 360.6/km^{2} (933.9/sq mi)
- Time zone: UTC+01:00 (CET)
  - Summer (DST): UTC+02:00 (CEST)
- Postal codes: 52379
- Dialling codes: 02423
- Vehicle registration: DN
- Website: www.langerwehe.de

Langerwehe (German pronunciation: [ˈlaŋɐveːə]) is a municipality in the district of Düren in the state of North Rhine-Westphalia, Germany. It is located approximately 10 km west of Düren and 6 km East of Eschweiler.

== Geography ==
Langerwehe lies at the border of the Voreifel and is crossed by the brook Wehebach. Parts of the municipal area lies in the High Fens – Eifel Nature Park. The Town lies north of the Hürtgen Forest.

== Population ==
Historical population

Year	Pop.	±% p.a.
1965	9,976	—
1970	10,484	+1.00%
1975	10,841	+0.67%
1980	11,202	+0.66%
1985	11,761	+0.98%
1990	12,351	+0.98%
1995	12,999	+1.03%

Year	Pop.	±% p.a.
2000	13,665	+1.00%
2005	14,030	+0.53%
2010	14,095	+0.09%
2015	13,791	−0.44%
2020	14,071	+0.40%
2025	14,960	+1.23%

Source: Landesdatabank Nordrhein-Westfalen

== Places of interest ==
=== Holzheim Castle ===
Holzheim Castle lies west of Heistern in the municipality of Langerwehe, and is now a farm and riding stables.

=== Laufenburg ===
The Hill castle Laufenburg in the private forest of the Stolberg industrialist family Prym between Heistern and Merode was founded in the 12th century is and leased as an Estate with Restaurant.

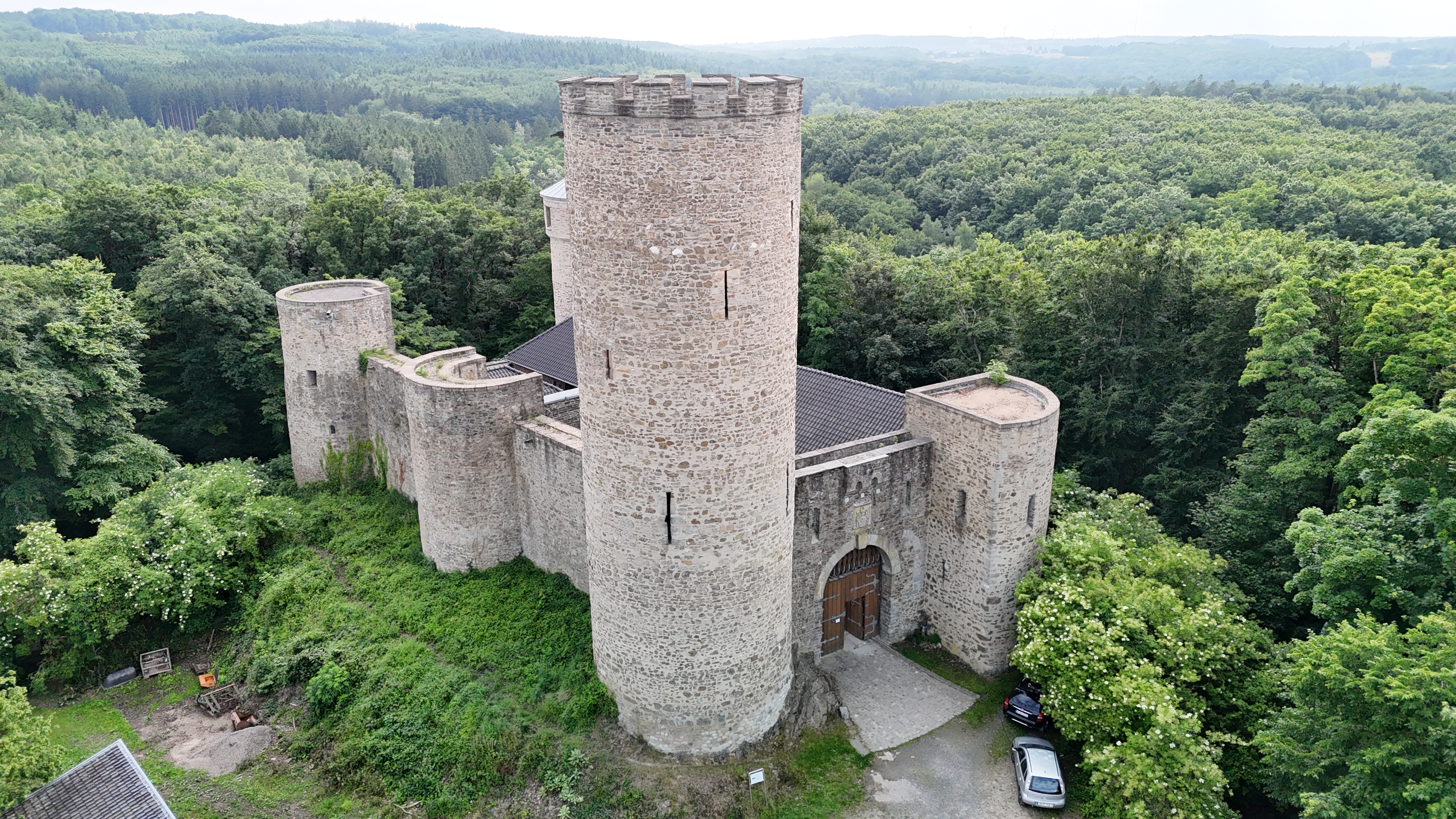
Laufenburg

=== Merode Castle ===
Merode Castle is situated in Merode and is owned by the Prince of the House of Merode since 1174. In the year 2000, large parts of the castle were severely damaged by a major fire. Substantial parts of the roof truss were completely burnt out. The reconstruction work continues until the present. Since 2009, a medieval Christmas market has been held on the site, which is considered one of the most beautiful markets in North Rhine-Westphalia.

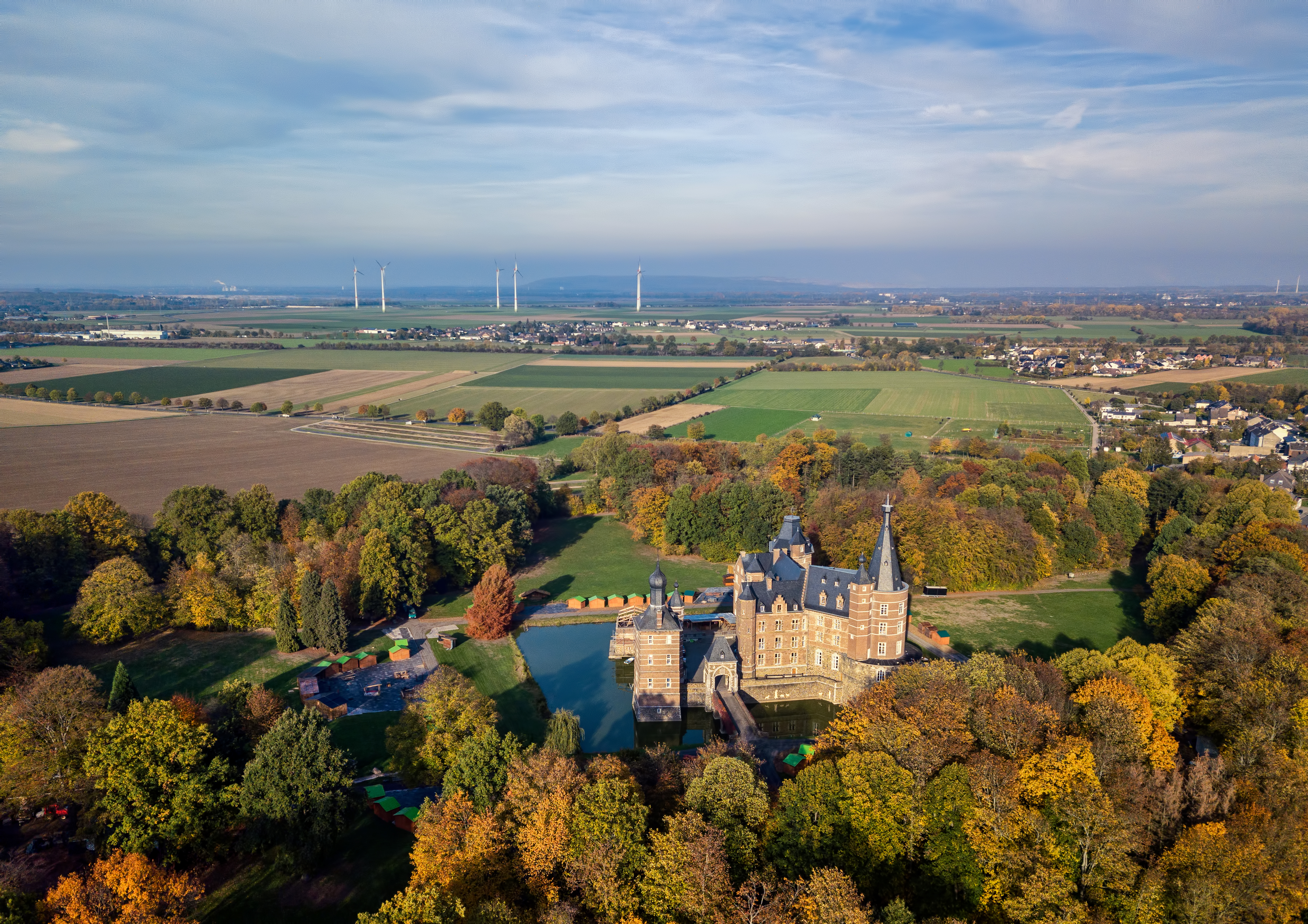
Merode Castle

== Twin town ==
- (United Kingdom) Exmouth, England (1985)

== Notable people ==
- Werner Reinartz (born 1963), economist
- Johannes Kaiser (1936–1996), sprinter
- Kurt Jarasinski (1938–2005), equestrian, died in Langerwehe
- Peter Münstermann (born 1956), politician (SPD) and mayor of Langerwehe
- Stephan Thiemonds (* 1971), author, grew up in Langerwehe
