= Samson ben Samuel =

14th-century rabbi

Samson ben Samuel of Jerusalem (שמשון בן שמואל איש ירושלים), also called Samson ben Samuel of Düren (מדורין) was born c. 1330 in Düren, Germany. He is known as the author of Kitzur Mordechai, an abridgement of Mordechai ben Hillel's work (not to be confused with the Mordechai Katan of Samuel ben Aaron Schlettstadt), and the Yeriot Izzim, a description of the 613 commandments in rhyming verse. According to Elhanan Reiner, the Yeriot Izzim was composed c. 1350 in Jerusalem. According to Shammai Rubin, the Kitzur Mordechai was completed c. 1382. The Yeriot Izzim includes explanatory glosses, though Reiner and Ephraim Kupfer dispute whether Samson himself is the author.

Only his Yeriot Izzim has been fully printed, in Venice, 1597. The Kitzur Mordechai on Yoma was published by Israel Peles in 1992, and the Kitzur Mordechai on Rosh Hashanah was published by Shammai Rubin in 2022.
