= Bollig =

Bollig is a surname. Notable people with the surname include:

- Ben Bollig (fl. 2006), British academic
- Brandon Bollig (born 1987), American ice hockey player
- Johann Bollig (1821–1895), German theologian and papal advisor
