= 1756 Düren earthquake =

Earthquake in Düren, Germany

- Location within Germany
- Local date: 15 February 1756
- Local time: about 8 a.m.
- Magnitude: 6.4 M_{L}
- Depth: 14–16 km
- Epicenter: 50.48°N 6.47°E
- Areas affected: Düren, North Rhine-Westphalia, Germany
- Max. intensity: MSK-64 VIII (Damaging)
- Casualties: 4 killed

The 1756 Düren earthquake occurred on the morning at 8 a.m. near the town of Düren with a magnitude of 6.4 on the Richter scale. It was one of the strongest earthquakes in Central Europe, and the strongest in Germany's recorded history. The depth of the hypocenter is estimated at 14–16 kilometres (8.7–9.9 mi). This earthquake may have been a remotely triggered event from the 1755 earthquake in Lisbon, but there is not enough evidence for this.

== Earthquake ==
The quake caused damage to buildings in the Cologne, Aachen, Jülich and Bad Münstereifel area. The earthquake was felt in Berlin, Stuttgart and as far away as London and Paris. Damage corresponded to intensity level VIII on the Medvedev–Sponheuer–Karnik scale. According to today's assessment, it reached a magnitude of 6.4 on the Richter scale; significantly stronger than the earthquake in Roermond in 1992, which reached a magnitude of 5.9.

== Damage and casualties ==
There were two deaths in Düren, where many buildings were badly damaged. Parts of the city walls of Düren and Bad Münstereifel collapsed or were heavily damaged. Some of the hot springs in Aachen ran dry, while others increased in strength. A spring at Breinigerberg also ran dry. The water table fell in open tin and lead mines and some became dry.

Two people were also killed and one man was seriously injured in Aachen. In addition, over 300 chimneys collapsed in Cologne. Damage was also reported in neighbouring countries.

== See also ==
- List of earthquakes in Germany
- List of historical earthquakes
