= List of earthquakes in Germany =

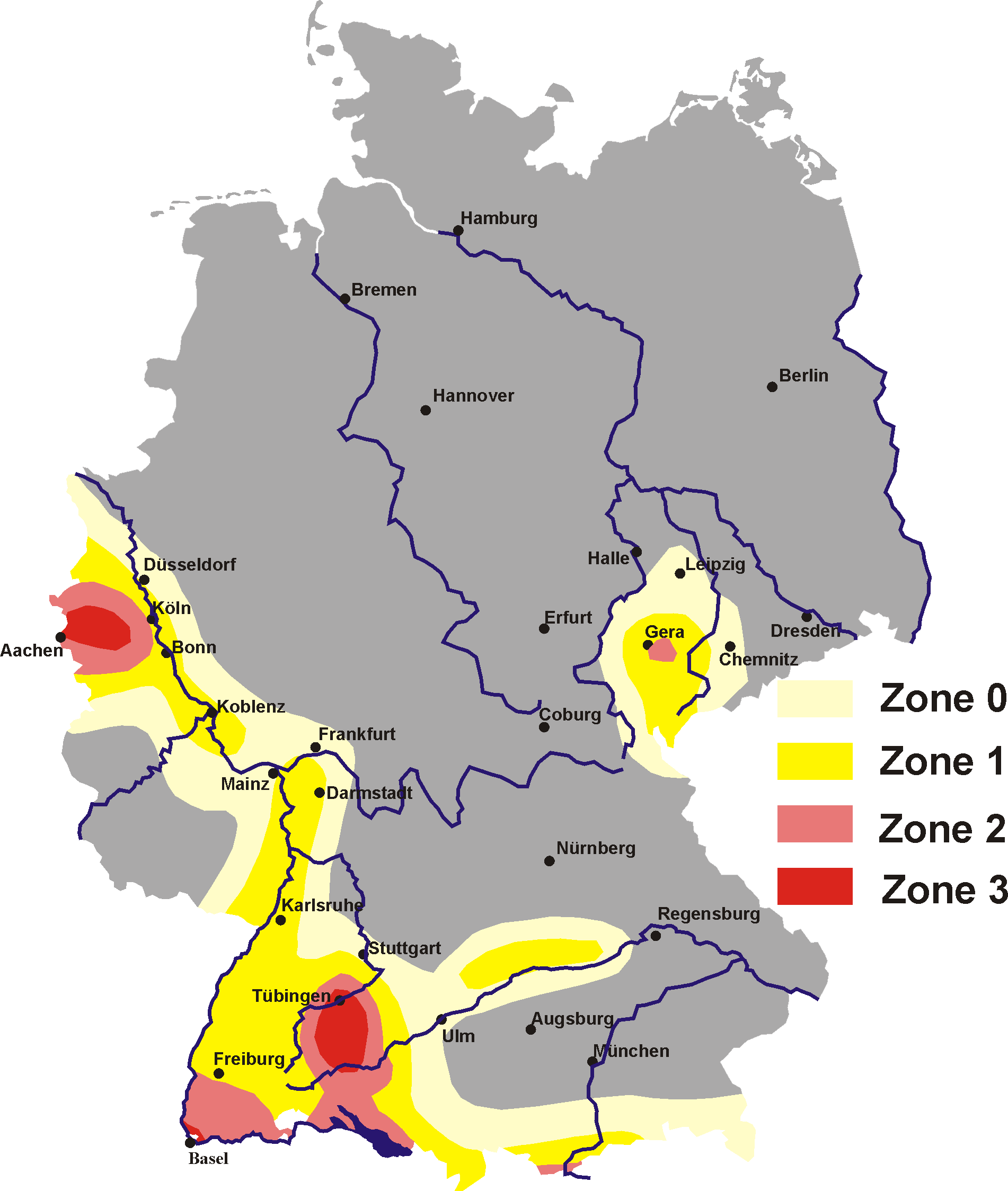
Earthquake zones in Germany

Earthquakes in Germany are relatively weak but occur several times a year, some of them in coal mining areas where blasting sets them off. Following a 4.0 quake, attributed to mining and centered in Saarwellingen, around 1,000 demonstrators protested on 24 February 2008, demanding an end to mining work. Reportedly, the tremor knocked over chimneys and caused power outages.

Most of the quakes occur in a seismically active zone associated with the Rhine Rift Valley that extends from the Swiss city of Basel into the Benelux countries, in particular in the "Cologne Bight". There are also earthquake zones on the northern edge of the Alps, around Lake Constance, in the Vogtland, around Gera and in the Leipzig plain.

== Geology ==
Germany is transected by parts of the European Cenozoic Rift System, particularly the Upper and Lower Rhine Grabens, and these areas remain tectonically active today. This zone of intraplate deformation is caused by the continuing effects of the Alpine orogeny as the African plate continues to push northwards into the Eurasian plate.

Seismologists consider earthquakes up to 6.4 on the Richter scale theoretically possible in the Lower Rhine Graben seismic zone. Earthquakes there occur sporadically and at magnitudes that are relatively low by international standards. However, the region is the most seismically active and experiences the strongest quakes in Germany. A strong earthquake (approximately 5.5 to 6.0 on the Richter scale) occurs there approximately every 200 years on average. A stronger earthquake would endanger cities including Aachen, Bonn, Düren, Düsseldorf, Grevenbroich, Heinsberg, Koblenz, Mönchengladbach, Cologne and Leverkusen as well as cities in the Netherlands including Roermond, Maastricht and Sittard and in Belgium including Eupen and Liège.

== Notable earthquakes ==
=== 1356 Basel earthquake ===
On 18 October 1356, an earthquake with its epicentre between Waldkirch and St. Peter in Breisgau-Hochschwarzwald destroyed the city of Basel in Switzerland and killed at least 300 people there alone; there was widespread damage from the quake and its precursor and aftershocks, and the main quake, estimated at 6.2 to 6.5 M_{w}, was felt as far away as Paris.

=== 1756 Düren earthquake ===
On 18 February 1756, at about 8 am, one of the strongest earthquakes in Central Europe, the strongest reported in Germany to date, struck Düren. The hypocentre is judged to have been at 14–16 km. It followed the 1755 Lisbon earthquake by several months and was the culmination of a series of quakes in Germany that had lasted several years. Buildings were damaged in Cologne, Aachen, Jülich and Bad Münstereifel; shaking was felt in London, Magdeburg and Strasbourg. Based on damage reports, the quake was assessed at VIII on the Mercalli intensity scale, and is today thought to have been approximately 6.1 or 6.4 on the Richter scale. The earthquake caused two deaths and severe damage in Düren, two deaths and one serious injury in Cologne. Portions of the city walls collapsed in Düren and Bad Münstereifel. Some of the hot springs in Aachen ran dry, while others increased in strength. A spring at Breinigerberg ran dry. The water table fell in open tin and lead mines; some became dry.

=== 1951 Euskirchen earthquake ===
On 14 March 1951, shortly before 11 am, a magnitude 5.8 quake with epicentre near Euskirchen injured 11 people and caused significant damage. Chimneys and roof tiles fell. Many people in Cologne took refuge in bomb shelters. This earthquake led to the establishment of the earthquake monitoring centre at Bensberg to provide data on seismic activity in the Rhineland.

=== 1992 Roermond earthquake ===
On 13 April 1992 at 3:20 am, a 5.3 M_{w} quake with its epicentre 4 km southwest of Roermond, the Netherlands, and its hypocentre 18 km deep shook the border region for 15 seconds. 30 people were injured in North Rhine-Westphalia alone, mostly by falling roof tiles and chimneys, and there was considerable damage to buildings. Ground shifts of up to 2 m occurred, and sand fountains in a few locations. The quake was felt as far away as Milan and London. The worst damage in Germany was in Heinsberg; in the Netherlands the area of damage extended several kilometres northwest of Roermond. Total damage costs in Germany topped 150 million DM, in the Netherlands, 170 million guilders. Aftershocks continued until 31 May.

=== 2009 Moers earthquake ===
On 24 July 2009 at 4:58 am, an earthquake with a magnitude of 3.3 M_{W} struck in western Germany, 20 km (12 mi) northwest of the city of Duisburg. The Geological Service of North Rhine-Westphalia announced the connection with mining confirmed by a 3.1 magnitude aftershock on 31 July 2009.

=== 2011 Koblenz earthquake ===
A 4.4 magnitude earthquake struck western Germany on 14 February 2011, at 13:43 local time. The earthquake epicenter was at Nassau an der Lahn, 65 km (40 mi) WNW from Frankfurt am Main. There were no immediate reports of damage.

== Other earthquakes in Germany ==
Date	Location	Magnitude	Damage / other notes
813	Aachen	unknown	Damage to royal chapel and collapse of passageway between it and the palace.
829	Aachen	unknown	Some damaged buildings
1223	Cologne	unknown	
1348	Altenberg	unknown	
18 September 1640	Düren	unknown	Damage to houses in Düren and Cologne.
1661	Dortmund	unknown	Tower of St. Reinoldi's church damaged; later collapsed.
16 February 1673	Remagen	unknown	Earthquake destroyed parts of the castle at Rolandseck.
1692	Aachen	unknown	Tower of St. Augustine's church collapsed.
26–27 December 1755	Aachen	unknown	Several moderate earthquakes in the Aachen area.
19 January 1757	Aachen	unknown	
1758	Aachen	unknown	
1759	Aachen	unknown	
9 June 1771	Aachen	unknown	
15–16 July 1773	Aachen	unknown	
23 February 1828	Aachen	unknown	
19, 22, 31 October 1873	Herzogenrath	unknown	Damaged buildings reported.
1877	Herzogenrath	unknown	Damaging quake
26 August 1878	Tollhausen	unknown	One person killed, damage to buildings. In Aachen numerous fallen chimneys, damaged buildings.
18 November 1881	Aachen	unknown	Strong quake felt in Aachen, Cologne, Düsseldorf, Arnsberg, Münster, and parts of Belgium and the Netherlands; aftershock on 24 November.
4 October 1886	Thuringia	unknown	"Violent earthquake shocks have occurred throughout Thuringia and other parts of Central Germany."
16 November 1911	near Albstadt on the Swabian Alb	M_{L}=6.1	
20, 23 November 1932	Aachen	unknown	
22 January 1970	Tübingen	unknown	a quake in Baden-Württemberg shook the metre-thick walls of the castle tower in Tübingen and caused damage to the pilgrimage church of Maria Zell near Hechingen that took 4 years to repair.
19 February 1971	Roermond, Netherlands	M_{L}=4.7	Earthquake with epicentre near the German border
2 June 1977	Soltau	4.0	
3 September 1978	Swabian Alb	M_{L}=5.7	The Hohenzollern Castle, home of the German Kaisers, was closed after sustaining extensive damage due to an earthquake in the Swabian Alb. 15 persons were reported injured in Tailfingen, Burladingen and Onstmettingen. 20 people had to be dug out of rubble.
24 May 1982	Waldfeucht	M_{L}=3.2	
1983	Liège	M_{L}=5.1	
11 December 1985	Simpelveld, Netherlands	M_{L}=2, 3.5	Two earthquakes across the border at Simpelveld in the Netherlands, registering 2 and 3.5 on the Richter scale.
13 March 1989	Vacha	5.7	Blasting at a potash mine in East Germany was blamed for a quake measured at 5.7 and felt in neighboring West Germany as well. Three villagers in the East German village of Vacha were injured.
22 July 2002	Alsdorf	5.0	At 7:41 am, magnitude 5.0, VI on the Mercalli scale at the epicentre, at a depth of 14.4 km: no injuries, some damage to buildings. The quake was felt in some parts of the Ruhr.
20 October 2004	Neuenkirchen	4.5	Before 9:00 am, a 4.5 quake, largest in the area since 1977.
5 December 2004	Waldkirch	5.2	Epicenter in Waldkirch close to Freiburg im Breisgau. Damage worth 10 million euros, mostly from cracks in walls.
3 August 2007	Plaidt	3.9	At 4:58 am, a magnitude 3.9 quake, felt in Koblenz, Westerwaldkreis, Rhein-Sieg-Kreis, Euskirchen, Bonn and Cologne.
12 December 2007	Duisburg	3.2	
24 January 2008	Duisburg	3.0	
10 September 2009	Westerwaldkreis	2.7	At 2:40 pm, a magnitude 2.7 quake with epicentre at Eitelborn caused alarm in Montabaur, Neuwied, and Bad Ems.
8 September 2011	Xanten	4.5	At 9:04 pm, a magnitude 4.5 quake with epicentre at Xanten.
30 March 2014	Darmstadt	3.2	At 5:48 pm, an M3.2 quake hit Darmstadt
17 May 2014	Darmstadt	4.2	At 6.46 pm, Darmstadt was hit by a magnitude 4.2 quake.
8 June 2014	Darmstadt	3.3	An M3.3 earthquake hit Darmstadt at 4:15 pm
30 July 2019	Konstanz	3.7	An M3.7 earthquake hit Konstanz at 1:17 am
29 August 2019	Konstanz/[[]]	3.5	An M3.5 earthquake hit Konstanz/Dettingen at 4:22 pm
