= Benrath =

Benrath may refer to:

- Düsseldorf-Benrath, a part of the city of Düsseldorf in Germany
- Schloss Benrath, a historical building in Düsseldorf-Benrath
- Benrath line, a term of German linguistics (the maken-machen isogloss)

== People with the surname ==
- Karl Benrath (1845–1924), German church historian
- Martin Benrath (1926–2000), German actor
