= Sven Schaffrath =

German footballer

Personal information
- Date of birth: July 13, 1984 (age 42)
- Place of birth: Düren, Germany
- Height: 1.75 m (5 ft 9 in)
- Position: Defender

Youth career
- –1998: SG Germania Binsfeld
- 1998–2002: Bayer 04 Leverkusen

Senior career*
Years	Team	Apps	(Gls)
2002–2005	Bayer 04 Leverkusen II	60	(2)
2005–2007	Wuppertaler SV Borussia	33	(1)
2007–2008	Rot Weiss Ahlen	37	(0)
2009–2010	FC Erzgebirge Aue	31	(0)
2011	Viktoria Arnoldsweiler	2	(3)
2011–2012	VfB Lübeck	32	(1)
2012–2014	Alemannia Aachen	10	(2)

Managerial career
- 2012–2013: Alemannia Aachen II (assistant)
- 2013–2015: Alemannia Aachen II
- 2015: Alemannia Aachen (caretaker)
- * Club domestic league appearances and goals

Sven Schaffrath (born July 13, 1984 in Düren) is a German footballer who most recently played for Alemannia Aachen.
