= Burgau Castle =

- Schloss Burgau
- Düren, NRW in Germany
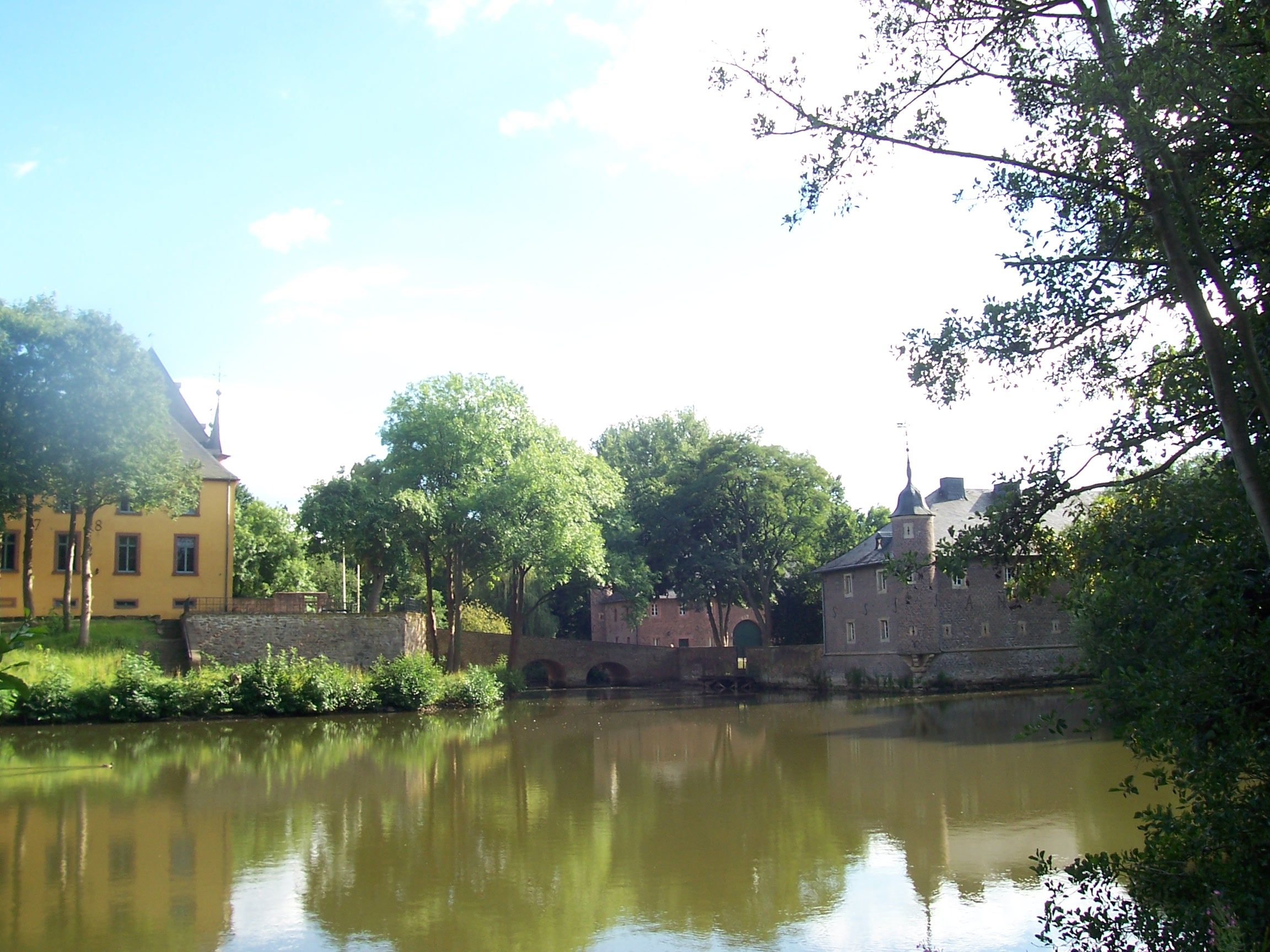
- Burgau Castle in 2009

Location
- Coordinates: 50.76703°N 6.49710°E

Burgau Castle (German: Schloss Burgau) is a water castle in Düren, located in the town forest at the edge of the district Niederau.

== Architecture ==
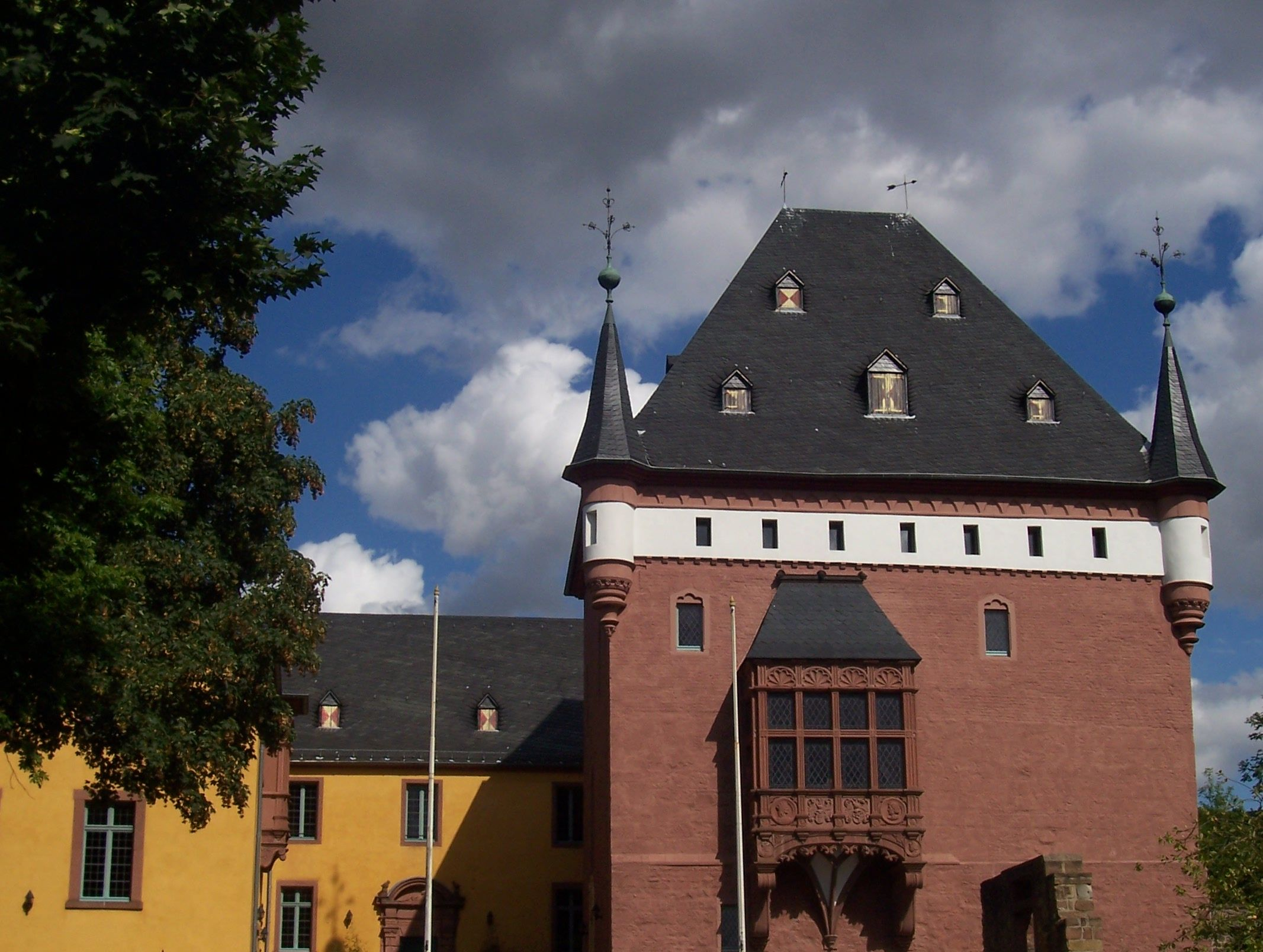
The main castle of Schloss Burgau

The earliest findings can be traced back to the year 1100. The building was constructed on a motte. Even today the manor house is situated on an island with a diameter of 50 meters. The keep also dates back to the Middle Ages; after that the southern, eastern and northern wings of the main castle were constructed. In the 16th century a bay, richly decorated with reliefs, was added to the house tower. This room is also referred to as the gazebo room.

In 1675 it was decided to renovate the damaged castle. Around 1730 the conversion into a baroque three-wing building began. Additionally, from 1685 onwards the construction of the Vorburg commenced, an outer bailey consisting of a three-winged building used for the management of the castle. Like the inner bailey, it was also surrounded by a water-filled moat.

After the castle was destroyed during the Second World War in 1944, the restoration process lasted from 1975 to 1998.

== Today ==
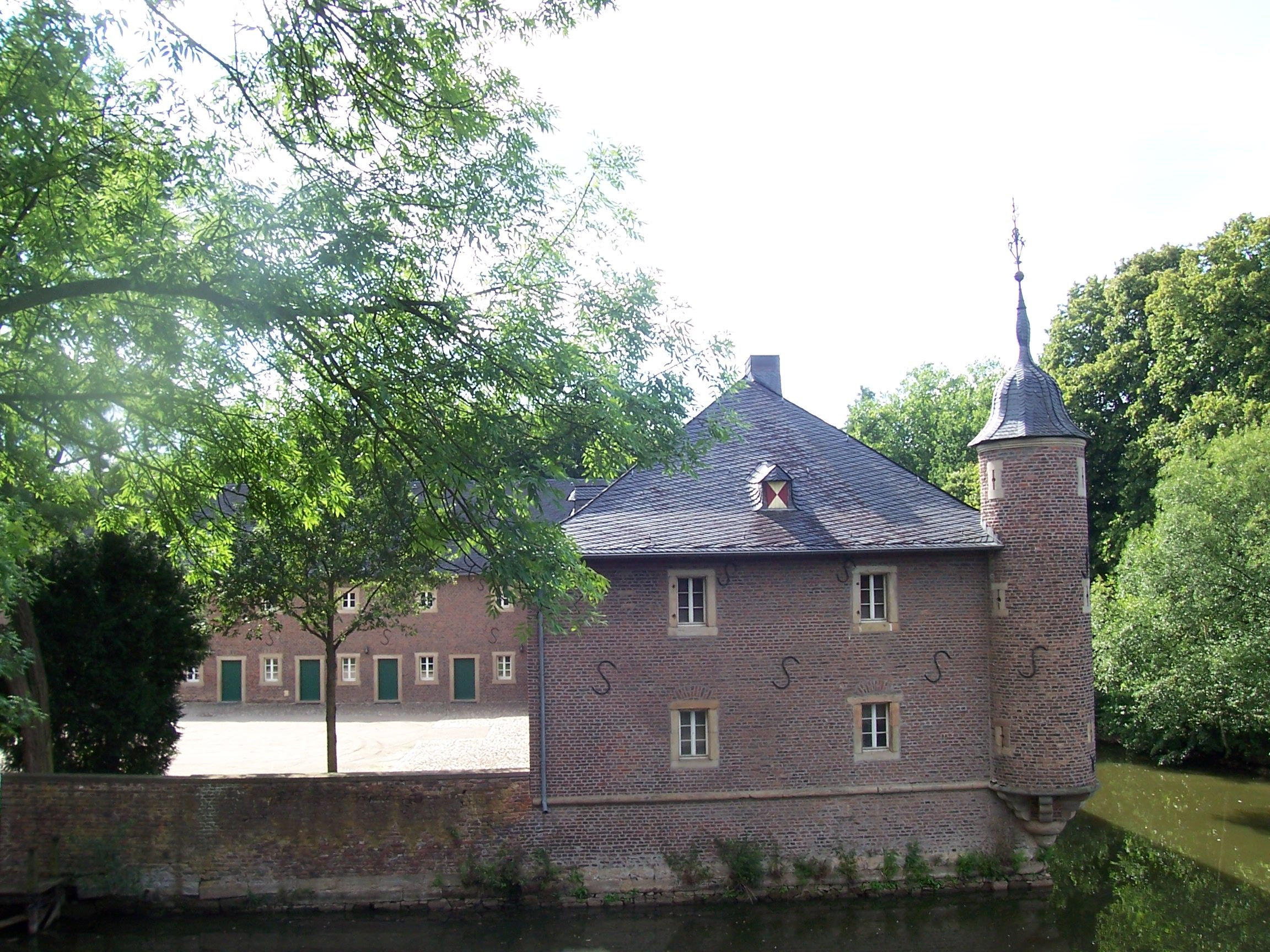
The Vorburg

Nowadays, the castle is a tourist attraction and is used as an event location, with various local societies using the premises. It is known as a popular destination with its pond and surrounding forest as well as the castle café.

The main part of the castle offers 450 square metres of exhibition space and a room for conferences. There are regular concerts and events in the Winkelsaal, a hall in the outer ward, and the courtyard.

Düren's registry office offers a marriage service in the gazebo room of the castle on select Saturdays during the year.

== Hans Holbein the Younger and the Portrait of Anne of Cleves ==
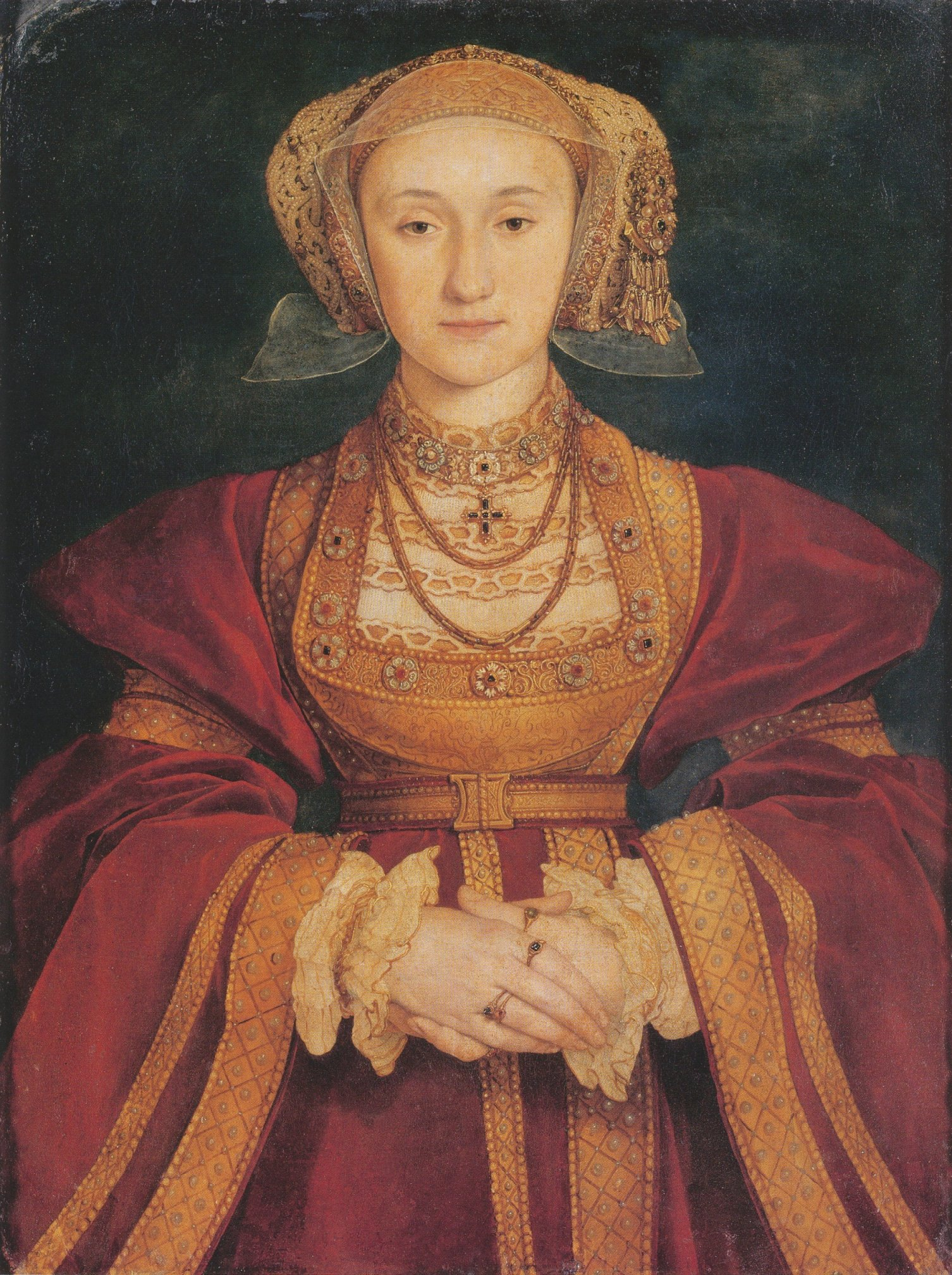
Anne of Cleves by Hans Holbein the Younger

In 1539 the artist Hans Holbein the Younger, known as one of the greatest portraitists of the 16th century and King's Painter to Henry VIII, travelled to Düren to paint a portrait of Anne of Cleves. After seeing Holbein's portrait of her, King Henry sent a delegation to Düren to negotiate the courtship and to bring Anne back to England.

However, meeting her was a disappointment for him, the marriage was never consummated and an annulment soon followed. Anne received the title of “The King's Sister“, a generous settlement and was often invited to court.
