= Isaac ben Meir Halevi of Düren =

German rabbi and posek

- Title: Rabbi

Personal life
- Born: 1220
- Died: 1300 (aged 79–80)
- Notable work: Sha'are Dura

Religious life
- Religion: Judaism

Jewish leader
- Residence: Düren, Holy Roman Empire

Rabbi Isaac ben Meir Halevi of Düren (1220–1300) was a German rabbi and codifier of halacha who lived in the second half of the thirteenth century in Düren. His work Sha'are Dura was a prominent codification of the laws of kashrut and family purity.

== Biography ==
Isaac was born in 1220. In his youth he studied under Rabbi Tobias b. Elijah of Vienne in France. The period of Düren's activity has hitherto been uncertain owing to the possibility of his having been confused with other contemporary local scholars of the same name. He would also study under Rabbi Meir ben Baruch of Rothenburg.

In the second half of the thirteenth century, Isaac moved to Düren, then in the Holy Roman Empire. He would become one of the leading German Talmudic authorities of his time, known for his work Sha'are Dura, the gates of Düren, which became a standard for understanding kashrut laws and issues of family purity. It was written with the intent to be used and studied by other rabbis, with a prominent printing of the work coming out in 1534. Several authorities who lived after him, among them Israel Isserlein, Solomon Luria, R. Nathan Shapiro, and Isserles, added to his book notes and explanations. This work would remain one of the important works of halachic code until Rabbi Joseph Caro's Shulchan Arukh.

Along with his contributions to Jewish scholarship, Isaac would become a prominent member of the Ashkenazi school of Talmudic commentators known as tosafists.

According to Leopold Zunz Isaac may be Isaac b. Meïr he-Ḥasid who wrote Tiḳḳun Sheṭarot.

Isaac died in 1300.
