= Klaus H. Carl =

German author and photographer

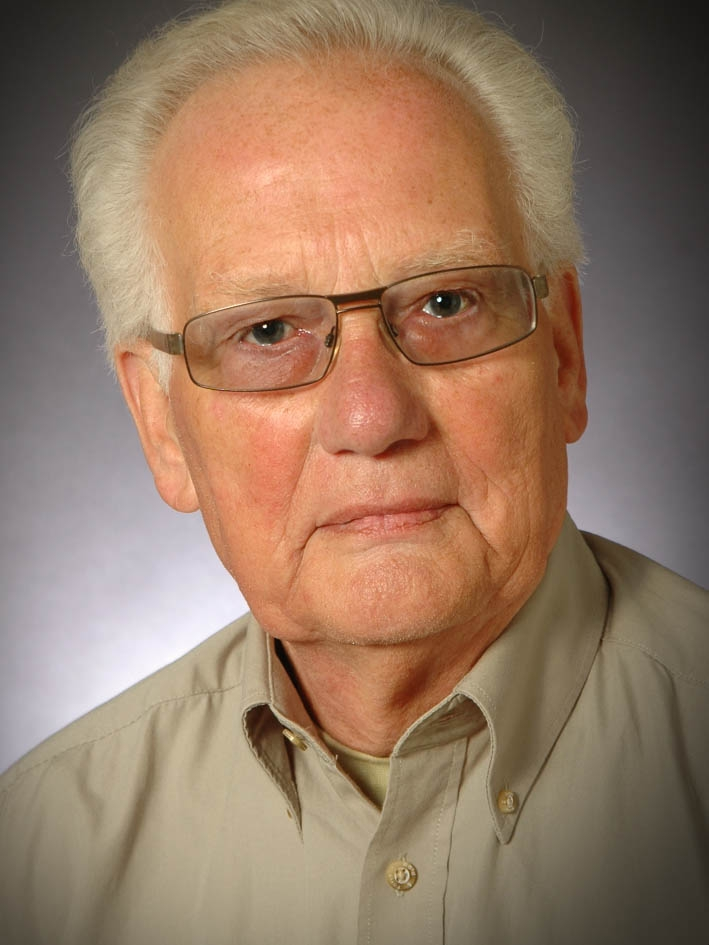
- Klaus H. Carl, 2012
- Born: 1935 (age 90–91); Düren, North Rhine-Westphalia, Germany
- Occupations: Author, photographer

Klaus H. Carl (born 1935) is a German author and photographer, based in North Rhine-Westphalia.

== Early life ==
Carl attended the ‘Volksschule’ (elementary school) in Cottbus and Bad Hersfeld, and then the convent school of Bad Hersfeld. He spent over ten years in the coal-mining district of Aachen, during which time he completed his studies of the Mining industry as a graduate engineer. He was then employed in the public service, specializing in tunnel mining and construction, and later on in the introduction of IT in administration. Carl simultaneously pursued a career as a lecturer, teacher and mentor, which he continues to this day.

== Authorship ==
Carl first began to write professionally in 1992, when his "Die Kleine PC-Fibel" – an introductory manual to MS-DOS (a precursor to MS-Windows) – was published at R. G. Fischer-Verlag, Frankfurt.

Since 2002, Klaus H. Carl has written and co-written numerous texts accompanied by his own photographs in illustrated books, producing various publications on art, its genres, and its styles.

== Photography ==
In the 1950s, Carl pursued his hobby of photography and he became further involved with the art after transient experiments with various small film formats.

In 1980, and then in 1985, Carl held his first exhibitions in the Düren city library, where he showcased photographs of the great earthquake of Azerbaijan and ‘Landscapes of France’. Throughout the 1990s, his work appeared in exhibitions in Paris, St. Petersburg, Bucharest, and Ho Chi Minh City, granting him a worldwide stage and international exposure. Since 1997, his photographs have featured in the Cities collection of illustrated books at Parkstone International publishing house.

== Works ==
=== Art Titles ===
- Athens (2002)
- Dubai (2005)
- Prague (2005)
- Saigon (2003)

=== Co-Authored Art Titles ===
- Gothic art (2008)
- Romanesque art (2008)
- Baroque art (2009)
- Rococo (2010)
- 1000 Portraits (2014)
- Vienna Secession (2011)
- Gothic art (2011)
- Romanesque art (2011)
- German Painting (2012/2013)

=== Photographic exhibitions ===
- Earthquake in Azerbaijan (1980), City Library Düren
- Landscapes of France (1983), Gallery and Publishing House in Paris
- Landscapes of France (1985), City Library Düren
- Landscapes of France (1989), City Library Düren
- Landscapes of France (1990), exhibitions at various locations in Rhineland
- Landscapes of France (1993), St. Petersburg, then other Russian cities
- Landscapes of France (1995), Regional Tax Office in Cologne
- Landscapes of France (1999), Bucharest
- Landscapes of France (2005), Ho Chi Minh City, Vietnam
