= Klaus Esser (politician) =

German politician (born 1981)

Member of the Landtag of North Rhine-Westphalia
- Incumbent
- Assumed office 1 June 2022

Personal details
- Born: 29 June 1981 (age 45) Düren
- Party: Alternative for Germany

Klaus Esser (born 29 June 1981 in Düren) is a German politician serving as a member of the Landtag of North Rhine-Westphalia since 2022. He is the group leader of the Alternative for Germany in the district council of Düren.
