= Hermann Schwarz (philosopher) =

German philosopher

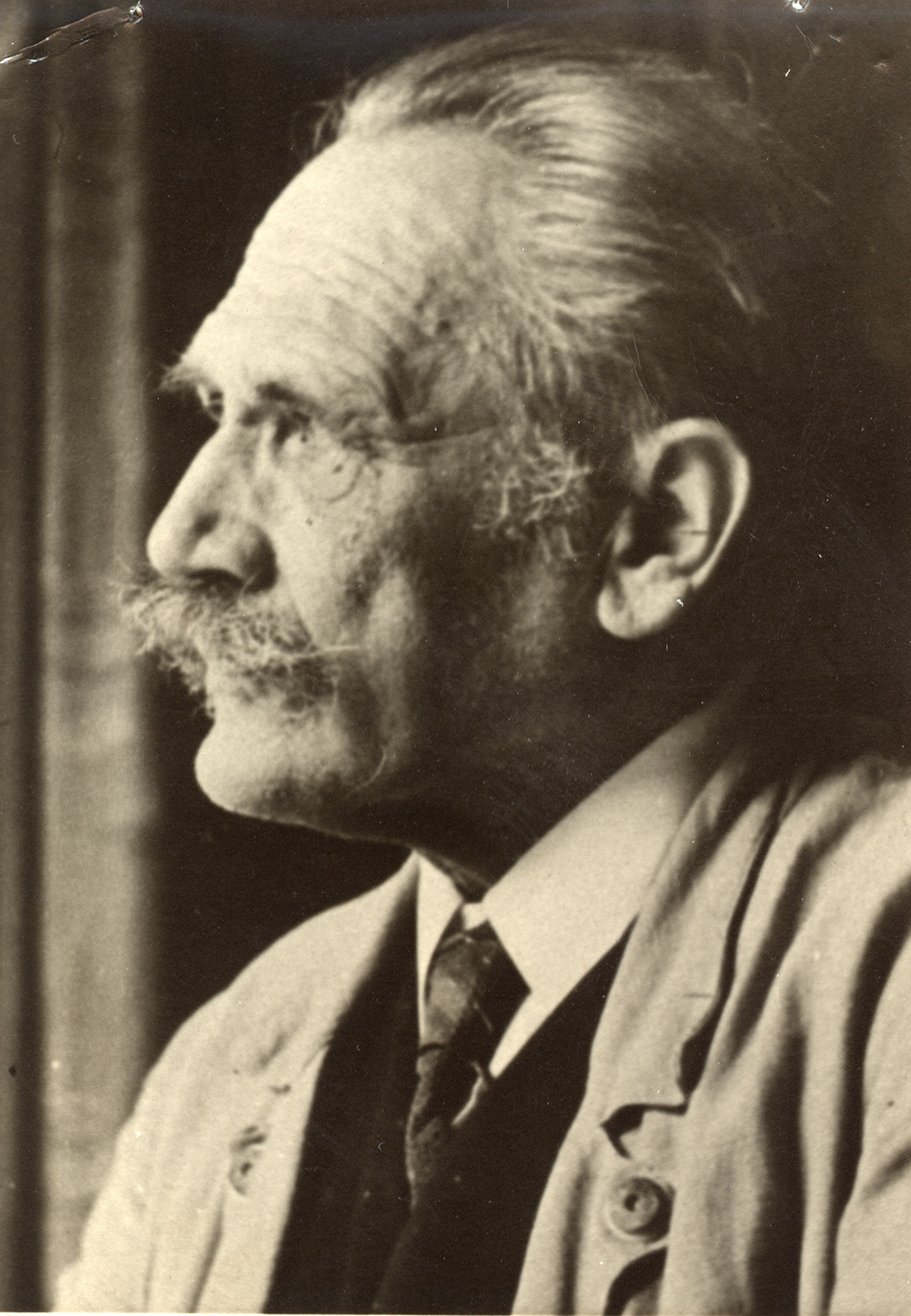
Philosopher Hermann Schwarz in Greifswald

Hermann Schwarz (December 22, 1864 in Düren, Rhenish Prussia – December 1951 in Darmstadt, West Germany) was a German philosopher. Educated at Halle, where he devoted himself to mathematics and to philosophy, he became professor at Marburg in 1908 and at Greifswald in 1910. His philosophy was not unlike that of Goswin Uphues. He edited the Zeitschrift für Philosophie und philosophische Kritik.

A notable ideologue of Nazism, Schwarz described National Socialist politics as a "religious experience". He subscribed to the views of Alfred Rosenberg and was an adherent of the German Faith Movement.

== Works ==
- Das Wahrnehmungsproblem (1892)
- Was will der kritische Realismus? (1894)
- Grundzüge der Ethik (1896)
- Psychologie des Willens zur Grundlegung der Ethik (1900)
- Das Sittliche Leben (1901)
- Glück und Sittlichkeit. 1902.
- Der moderne Materialismus. 1904; zweite Auflage, 1912.
- Der Gottesgedanke in der Geschichte der Philosophie. Winter, Heidelberg 1913.
- Fichte und wir. Sechs Vorlesungen, gehalten auf der Lauterberger Weltanschauungswoche 2. – 7. Oktober 1916, Zickfeld, Osterwieck/Leipzig 1917.
- Weltgewissen oder Vaterlandsgewissen. Kayser, Erfurt 1919.
- Das Ungegebene. Eine Religions- und Wertphilosophie. Mohr-Siebeck Verlag, Tübingen 1921.
- Über Gottesvorstellungen großer Denker. Sechs Hochschulvorträge. (Philosophische Reihe, 12. Band.) Rösl & Cie. München 1922
- Ethik. Ferd. Hirt, Breslau 1925.
- Ethik der Vaterlandsliebe. H. Beyer, Langensalza 1926.
- Gott im Volkstum. H. Beyer, Langensalza 1928.
- Gott, Jenseits von Theismus und Pantheismus. Junker und Dünnhaupt, Berlin 1928.
- Kriegsschuldlüge und unsere Pflicht. Ratsbuchhandlung L. Bamberg, Greifswald 1928.
- Gemeinschaft und Idee. W. de Gruyter, Berlin 1930.
- Systematische Selbstdarstellung. Junker und Dünnhaupt, Berlin 1933.
- Nationalsozialistische Weltanschauung. Freie Beitrage zur Philosophie des Nationalsozialismus aus den Jahren 1919–1933. Junker und Dünnhaupt, Berlin 1933.
- Christentum, Nationalsozialismus und Deutsche Glaubensbewegung. Junker und Dünnhaupt, Berlin 1934. 2. Auflage 1938.
- Ekkehart der Deutsche. Völkische Religion im Aufgang. Junker und Dünnhaupt, Berlin 1935
- Zur philosophischen Grundlegung des Nationalsozialismus. Schriften der Deutschen Hochschule für Politik. 1. Idee und Gestalt des Nationalsozialismus, Heft 17, Berlin 1936.
- Deutscher Glaube am Scheidewege. Junker und Dünnhaupt, Berlin 1936.
- Die Irminssäule als Sinnbild deutschvölkischen Gottesglaubens. Junker und Dünnhaupt, Berlin 1937.
- Grundzuge einer Geschichte der artdeutschen Philosophie. Junker und Dünnhaupt, Berlin 1937.
- Deutsche Gotteserkenntnis einst und jetzt. Durchbruch-Verlag, Stuttgart 1938.
- Gesammelte Werke. Junker und Dünnhaupt, Berlin 1940.
- Ewigkeit. Ein deutsches Bekenntnis. Junker und Dünnhaupt, Berlin 1941.
