= Stephan Thiemonds =

German author

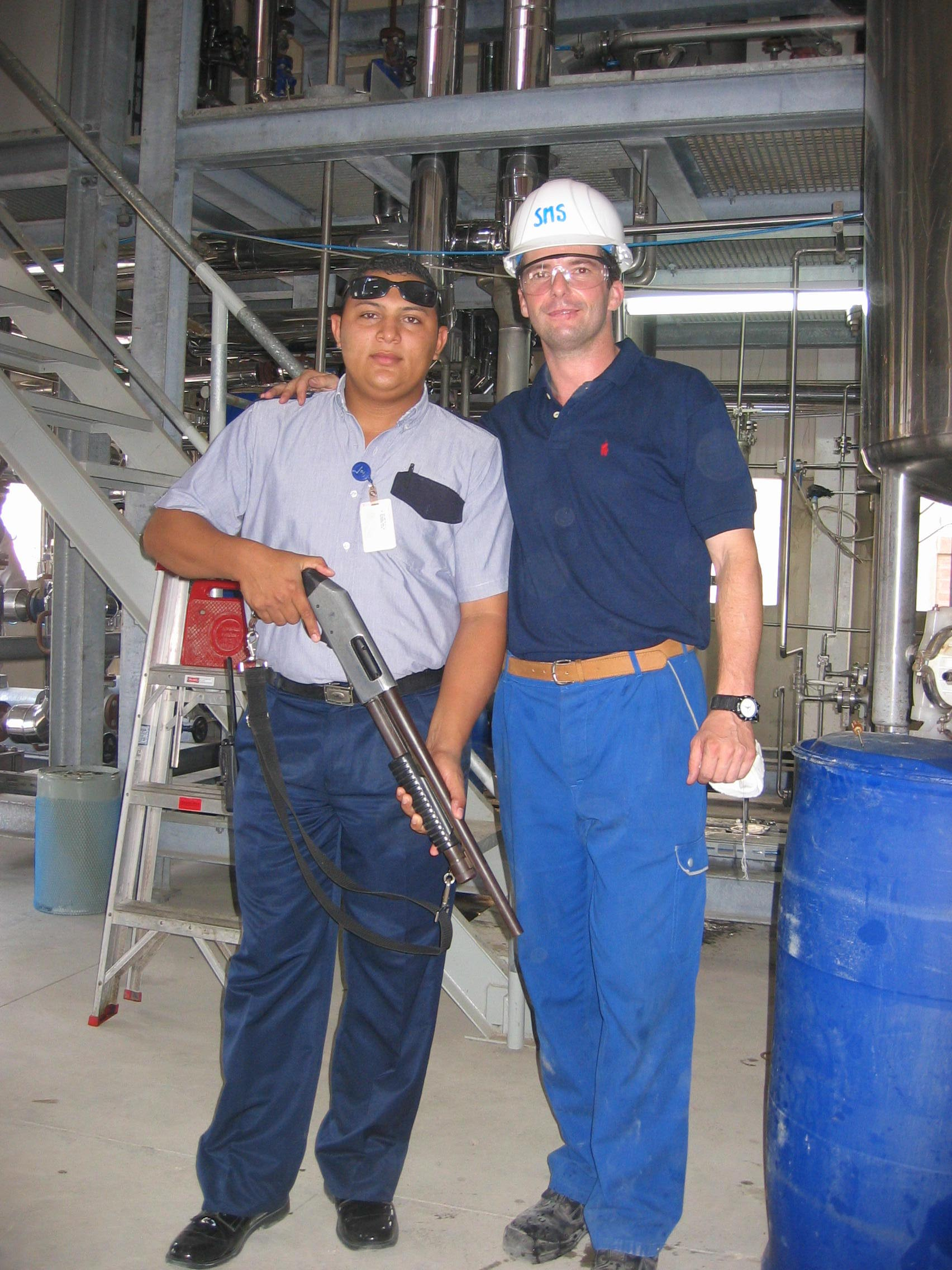
Thiemonds (r) in Barranquilla, Apr. 2008

Stephan Thiemonds (born April 5, 1971, in Lendersdorf/Düren, North Rhine-Westphalia), is a German author, who writes travelogues and short stories in the style of gonzo journalism and magic realism, in which the boundaries between reality and fantasy become blurred. Due to his professional career, many of his stories can be categorised as Proletarian literature.

== Life ==
Thiemonds trained as a coppersmith and a welder at GEA Cancler GmbH in Düren, and later qualified as a construction foreman and a European Welding Specialist (EWF). Between 2003 and 2022 he travelled as a service and commissioning technician across the world working for Buss SMS Canzler GmbH, based in Butzbach, Germany, a manufacturer of industrial machines, like Thin Film Evaporators, specialised in process engineering. Numerous professional and personal journeys to all continents inspired him to write his semi-autobiographical short stories. During a work assignment in 2014 at DSI Laser Service (Thailand) in Chonburi, near Map Ta Phut Industrial Estate, Thiemonds encountered laser beam welding for the first time in a practical setting, which inspired him to write the story The Return of the Jedi Knights. This appeared in Volume 7 of his book series, Welding Connects, in the new edition of the same name, and in the English translation. In it, he explores both his fascination with this welding process and his enthusiasm for the Thai company that welds with light, for which he has worked part-time as a consultant on German technologies since 2017. At the end of 2022 he changed full-time to DSI Laser Service Thailand Co., Ltd.

In the summer of 2002 he began a bike journey that lasted many months, and took him all the way to Australia. He was sponsored on this endeavour, with people pledging €1 for every kilometer cycled. The monies collected were donated to the fund for the restoration of a fire-damaged spire that forms part of Merode Castle, the most famous landmark of his hometown of Merode, municipality of Langerwehe.

Since 2012 Thiemonds has lived with his partner and their daughter in Darmstadt. In 2015 he moved back to his origin home country Langerwehe. In 2017 he incorporated as a German Ambassador the not-for-profit organization Child's Dream. On 29 November 2018, the Saysa Morn Primary School, built under the auspices of Child's Dream and funded by Querweltein Unterwegs readers, friends and patrons, was inaugurated in the Cambodian province of Banteay Meanchey province.

== 359° - The Workaday Life Of An Industrial Gypsy ==
For the main title of the German-language book series named Querweltein Unterwegs, the author chose the main title for the foreign-language book series inscribed angle 359°. Its interpretation is ambiguous. The title is based on both occupational travel and professional life. In addition, the inscribed angle should point to the nearly circular earth: an almost perfect 360° full angle. In contrast to this, 1° is missing from the book title. Symbolic of this is that neither travel nor professional life is perfect. How hard you try to matter, at least one piece is still missing. However, the lack of a degree should not be interpreted as a flaw, but indicate a belonging to the art of living area: on the left dealing with all requirements and entanglements that bring the travel and professional life with him. Thiemonds was inspired to create the book series main title 359° during a professional stay in Shanghai when visiting a shopping mall, by the logo of the Chinese sportswear and sports equipment manufacturers 361˚.

A selection of his short stories from his German “Querweltein – Unterwegs“ series of books has been translated into English. It contains stories from China, Taiwan, Thailand, South Korea, Iran, Colombia, Antarctica, Denmark, Turkey, Sweden, Finland, Great Britain, Germany, from “Seventh Heaven“ and from “Above Clouds“.In 2016 a revised 359° edition was published in India.

=== Cover ===
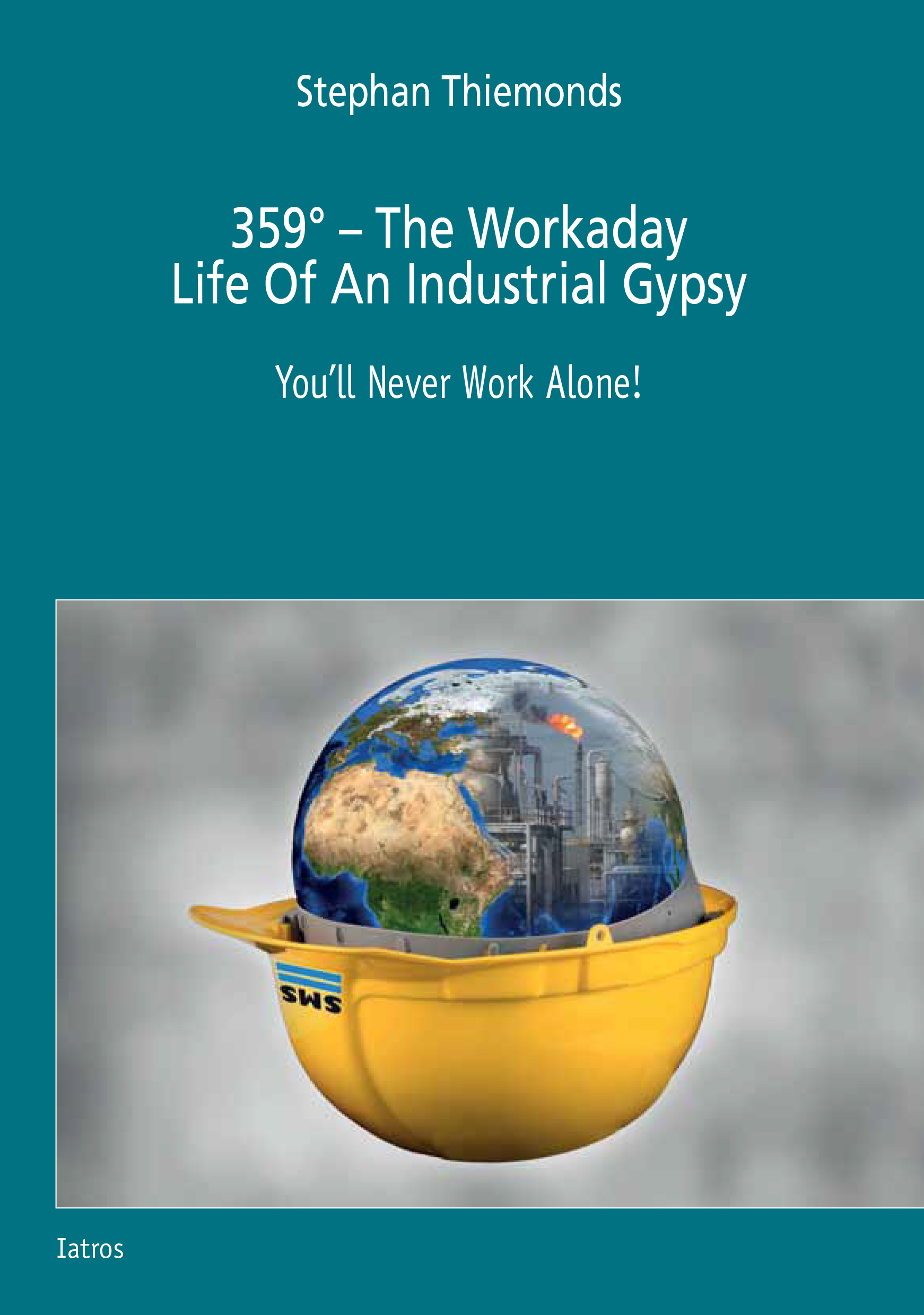
Cover 359° - The Workdays Life Of An Industrial Gypsy – You’ll never work alone!

The cover of the first English edition shows a hard hat held upside down. On its front, also wrong way up, the logo of the machinery and plant engineering company Buss SMS Canzler GmbH is depicted. As is usual in the international industry sector, the logo on the front serves to identify the wearer's company affiliation. Within the helmet rests the earth, resembling an egg in an egg cup.

The angle measurement of 359° in the book title is meant to express that no man-made workmanship will ever achieve perfection (the geometric unit of a turn). The subheadingYou’ll Never Work Alone is borrowed in slightly altered form from the song title "You'll Never Walk Alone".

== You’ll Never Work Alone! ==
The subtitle of the foreign Querweltein Unterwegs book series, You'll Never Work Alone !, was borrowed in slightly modified form, from the song title You'll Never Walk Alone. While referring „to go“ (together-through-life) to the lyrics „walk“, so the „work“ in the book subtitle is in conjunction with the (professional) work. Thiemonds was inspired for this pun during a professional stay in Liverpool. During his research on new England-stories that was published in 2008 in the Querweltein Unterwegs edition 3, Despite overtime explore the world, he came across the original Broadway anthem of FC Liverpool entered the football world was through the Fanblock The Kop and up is now sung before every home game. Emotionally touched by the backstory lyric, Thiemonds discovered parallels to the (professional) life of a single traveler. You'll Never Work Alone should remember that nobody, never accomplishes a productive activity all to yourself. Always there are people (or colleagues) who have either provided a preparatory work, or stand supportive aside during the actual work task. The subtitle is to encourage in (professional) difficult times to carry on / -to go forward/ - to work further. It is also intended to draw attention to always consider the personal work as a synergy.

== Co-author of technical articles ==
In conjunction with his occupational activities at DSI Laser Service Thailand Co, Ltd, Thiemonds writes technical articles in the field of Laser Beam Welding technology together with Prof. Dr.-Ing Gerd Kuscher from the German welding society Schweißtechnische Lehr- und Versuchsanstalt, SLV Hannover. The articles are published in various trade journals, both in German and in English translations, for instance in Schweissen und Schneiden, Der Praktiker, Giesserei, Welding and Cutting. Their publisher is DVS-Media, also named Home of Welding, a division of the German, technical-scientific professional association DVS - Deutscher Verband für Schweißen und verwandte Verfahren e. V. (German welding society). Furthermore, Thiemonds writes technical articles for the India-based online magazine for welding technology Weldfab Tech Times.

== Works ==
- 2003 Querweltein – Eine Radreise voller Gegensätze (New Edition 2013 ), ISBN 978-3-86963-706-8
- 2005 Querweltein – Unterwegs: Schrauben, Spesen und Chinesen, ISBN 978-3-937439-27-3
- 2008 Querweltein – Unterwegs: Trotz Überstunden die Welt erkunden, ISBN 978-3-86963-368-8
- 2010 Querweltein – Unterwegs: Seemannsgarn oder Sabotage in der Antarktis, ISBN 978-3-86963-369-5
- 2015 Querweltein – Unterwegs: Berufsalltag oder Alltagsflucht, ISBN 978-3-86963-374-9
- 2015 Querweltein – Unterwegs: Die Entdeckung der Erfinderkinder, Iatros, Sonnefeld, ISBN 978-3-86963-054-0
- 2015 Querweltein – Unterwegs: Schweißen verbindet, Iatros, Sonnefeld, ISBN 978-3-86963-888-1.
- 2020 Querweltein – Unterwegs: Schweißen verbindet, (expanded new edition), DVS Media, Düsseldorf, ISBN 978-3-96144-078-8.
- 2025 Princess of Darkness – Inferno Vengeance, (dual language, german and englisch), tredition, ISBN 978-3-384-65924-8

In English:

- 2012 359° - Workadays Life Of An Industrial Gypsy – You’ll never work alone!, ISBN 978-3-86963-367-1
- 2016 359° – Worker, Writer, World-traveller – You’ll never work alone!. Notionpress, India, ISBN 978-1-94612985-7.
- 2023 Welding connects – You'll Never Work Alone (Translation of the 2020 in German language published title Schweißen verbindet, revised and expanded with new stories). DVS Media Düsseldorf, ISBN 978-3-96144-197-6

In Chinese:

- 2016 环游地球359°一位德国工程师的工业之旅》你不是一个人在奋斗！ (englisch, 359° - Workdays Life Of An Industrial Gypsy) Intellectual Property Publishing House, Beijing, ISBN 978-7-5130-4141-6.

Technical articles (selection):

In German:

- Reparatur eines Dampfturbinenrotors in Thailand mittels Laserschweißtechnik, in Der Praktiker (issue 6/2020, p. 274–277).
- Impuls-Laserstrahlschweißen – start thinking big! Reparaturauftragschweißen eines Stossdämpfergehäuses durch Impuls-Laserstrahlschweißen, in Der Praktiker issue 1/2023, p. 22–25
- Problemlos ohne Wärmevor- und -nachbehandlung: Reparaturschweißen von Gusseisen mit Kugelgraphit, in Der Praktiker, issue 4/2023, p. 156–159 und in Giesserei issue 8/2023, p. 32–35
- Impuls-Laserstrahlschweißen – über den Wolken von Thailand: Reparaturschweißen von Flugzeugturbinenteilen durch Impuls-Laserstrahlschweißen, in Der Praktiker (issue 11/2023, p. 668–674).
- Reparaturen von Flugzeugturbinenteilen durch Impuls-Laserstrahlschweißen, in Schweissen und Schneiden (issue 12/2023, S. 934–939).
- Wärmeeinflusszone (WEZ) – Vergleich zwischen den Prozessen Lichtbogenhand-, Metall-aktivgas- und Impuls-Laserstrahlschweissen: WEZ – Die meistgefürchtete „Danger Zone“ der Schweißtechnik in Der Praktiker (issue 7-8/2024, S.52-56).
- Der Impuls-Laser macht das Rennen. Instandsetzung des erodierten Austrittsstutzens eines Recyclegas-Kompressorturbinengehäuses mithilfe des Impuls-Laserstrahlauftragschweißens in Der Praktiker (issue 4/2025, p. 18–21).
- Ein neuartiges Reparaturverfahren: Puls-Laserstrahlschweißen von Gusseisen mit Kugelgrafit, in Schweissen und Schneiden, issue 11/2025, p. 48–53.
- Impuls-Laserstrahlschweißen von Duplex-Stahl, in Der Praktiker, issue 4/2026, p. 40–43.
- Impuls-Laserstrahlschweißen: Einfluss des Schweißverfahrens auf die Grobkornbildung in der WEZ, in Der Praktiker, issue 7-8/2026, p. 48–53.

In English:

- Repair of a steam turbine in Thailand using pulsed laser beam welding, in Welding and Cutting (issue 02/2020, p. 104–106)
- Pulsed laser beam welding – start thinking big! Repair welding of a shock absorber housing, Welding and Cutting issue 1/2023, p. 10–13
- Repair welding of spheroidal graphite cast iron – Problem-free without heat pre-treatment and post-treatment, in Welding and Cutting, issue 2/2023, p. 20–23
- Pulsed laser welding – High above the clouds of Thailand, in Welding and Cutting, issue 1/2024, p. 82–88 / as extra edition published in Schweissen und Schneiden, issued 4/2024
- HAZ – The most feared Danger Zone in welding technology, in Welding and Cutting, issue 2/2024, p.28-32.
- Pulse Laser Welding Development: Back then it has started with thinking small – now it’s time to start thinking BIG!, in Indias Welding Magazine Weldfab Tech Times, issue 10/11 2024, p. 48–52.
- Pulsed Laser Beam Welding leads the Race, in Welding and Cutting, issue 2/2025, p. 136–138 / published as a special section inSchweissen und Schneiden, issue 9/2025.
- Case study: Steam Turbine casing repair. An overview of the pulsed laser beam welding process and the qualification and inspection procedures used in this refurbishment. In: Inspection Trends. issue 12/2025.
- A Novel Approach to Pulsed Laser Beam Welding of Nodular Cast Iron, in Schweissen und Schneiden issue 4/2026, p. 79-83.
- Pulse Laser Beam Welding of Duplex Steel, in Welding and Cutting Special issue 2/2026, p.97-100.

== See also ==
- Merode and Schloss Merode on the German-language Wikipedia
- Querweltein Unterwegs on the German-language Wikipedia
