= Werner Reinartz =

German economist

Werner Josef Reinartz (born in 1963 in Langerwehe, Germany) is a German economist. Since 2007 he is a Professor of Retailing and Customer Management at the University of Cologne and the Director of the Center for Research in Retailing (IFH).

== Life and education ==
Reinartz studied Agricultural Sciences at the Technical University of Munich and graduated in 1990 with a degree in Agricultural Engineering (Dipl.Ing. agr.). After completing his studies, he worked in international sales and marketing at Lorenz von Ehren in Hamburg, Germany. In 1994, he enrolled at Henley Management College, England, and graduated with a master's degree in Business Administration. His doctoral studies focusing on marketing took place from 1995 to 1999 at the University of Houston in the United States. His dissertation was one of the first academic research studies that dealt comprehensively and empirically with the topic 'Customer Lifetime Value'. While the previous belief in much of management writing was that customer loyalty is unanimously beneficial, he was the first to show that the correlation of customer loyalty and customer lifetime value is in many cases marginal. Importantly, this means that, rather than focusing on loyalty management, managers have to understand the measurement and management of customer lifetime value instead.

== Teaching and research ==
After receiving his doctorate in 1999, he started his academic career at INSEAD in Fontainbleau, France, where he worked until 2007. Before leaving, he held the Cora Chaired Professor of Management and Retailing. In 2007, he was appointed a Chaired Professor of Business Administration, Retailing and Customer Management at the University of Cologne and remains till present. In parallel, he is also the Director of the Center for Research in Retailing (IFH), which was founded in 1929 .

His research interests in marketing include marketing strategy, retailing, customer relationship management, advertising effectiveness and digital transformation. Reinartz predominantly focuses on solving problems that are meaningful in managerial practice. His articles and the findings of his research work are published in leading marketing journals and have received a number of highly-rated research awards. From 2017-20 he was co-editor of the International Journal of Research Marketing (IJRM). In addition, he has worked as an editor for a number of top-range publications.

== Awards and nominations ==
In 2016, Reinartz was listed in the Frankfurter Allgemeine Zeitung as one of the top economists in Germany. He was awarded the Varadarajan Award for Early Career Contributions to Marketing Strategy Research in 2009, an award of the American Marketing Association for highest research impact within 10 years of the dissertation Elbeck and Vander Schee in 2014 listed Reinartz as the leading non-US researcher in citations in leading marketing journals. In 2021, he was ranked in the Top 2% worldwide of the 2021 Elsevier-BV/Stanford study on career-long impact (1960-2020), drawing on a database of almost 7 million scientists worldwide. Equally, in 2021, he was the recipient of two long-term impact awards, namely the Jan Benedict E.M. Steenkamp Award for Long-Term Impact in the International Journal of Research in Marketing and the ISBM-David T. Wilson-Sheth Foundation Award for Long-Term Impact in B2B Marketing.

== Work and publications (selection) ==
- Reinartz, Werner, Nico Wiegand, and Monika Imschloß (2019), “The Impact of the Digital Transformation on the Retailing Value Chain”, International Journal of Research in Marketing, Vol 36(3).
- Becker, Maren, Nico Wiegand, and Werner Reinartz, (2019), “Does It Pay to Be Real? Understanding Authenticity in TV Advertising", Journal of Marketing, 83(1), 24-50. [Google Scholar citations: 1; Web of Science citations: 1]
- Lobschat, Lara, Ernst C. Osinga, Werner Reinartz (2017), „What Happens Online Stays Online? – Segment-Specific Online and Offline Effects of Banner Advertisements” Journal of Marketing Research, 54 (6), 901-913.
- Reinartz, Werner and Monika Imschloß (2017), “From Point-of-Sale to Point-of-Need: How Digital Technology Transforms Retailing”, Marketing Intelligence Review, Vol. 9(1), 43-47.
- Ulaga, Wolfgang and Werner Reinartz (2011), “Hybrid Offerings: How Manufacturing Firms Combine Goods and Services Successfully”, Journal of Marketing, 75 (6), 5-23.
- Reinartz, Werner, Michael Haenlein, and Jörg Henseler (2009), „An Empirical Comparison of the Efficacy of Covariance-Based and Variance-Based SEM”, International Journal of Research in Marketing, 26 (2009), 332-344.
- Reinartz, Werner and Wolfgang Ulaga (2008), "How to Sell Services Profitably", Harvard Business Review, 86 (5), 90-98.
- Kumar, V., Rajkumar Venkatesan, and Werner Reinartz (2006), “Knowing What to Sell, When, and to Whom “, Harvard Business Review, 84 (3) March, 131-137.
- Reinartz, Werner, Jacquelyn Thomas, and V. Kumar (2005), “Balancing Acquisition and Retention Resources to Maximize Customer Profitability”, Journal of Marketing, 69 (January), 63-79.
- Reinartz, Werner, Manfred Krafft, and Wayne Hoyer (2004), ”The CRM Process: Its Measurement and Impact on Performance”, Journal of Marketing Research 41 (August), 293-305.
- Zeng, Ming and Werner Reinartz (2003), “Beyond Online Search: The Road to Profitability”, California Management Review, 45 Winter, 107-130.
- Reinartz, Werner and V. Kumar (2003), “The Impact of Customer Relationship Characteristics on Profitable Lifetime Duration”, Journal of Marketing, 67 (January), 77-99.
- Reinartz, Werner and V. Kumar (2002), “The Mismanagement of Customer Loyalty”, Harvard Business Review, 80 (July), 86-94.
- Reinartz, Werner and V. Kumar (2000), “On the Profitability of Long-Life Customers in a Noncontractual Setting: An Empirical Investigation and Implications for Marketing”, Journal of Marketing, 64 (4), October, 17-35.
