= Dan Ashkenazi =

13th-century German Talmudist

Dan Ashkenazi was a 13th-century German Talmudist and exegete. He was a prominent Talmudists of Germany and the teacher of Mordecai ben Hillel.

He emigrated to Spain toward the end of the 13th century, probably in consequence of the cruel persecutions to which the Jews of Germany were subjected at that time, when many were driven to seek asylum in other countries.

In Spain, where he was called "Ashkenazi" (German), he met the foremost rabbinical authorities, who thought highly of him. Dan, however, was so imprudent as to give a letter of recommendation to a youth who pretended to be a prophet (compare Abraham Of Avila); and when the latter turned it to account, Solomon Adret cast scorn upon the German rabbi in his circular letter on the pseudoprophet. Even before this occurrence the relations between these two men do not seem to have been very friendly, since Dan declared at Zaragoza that, from the strict point of view of the Halakah, there could be no objection to the slaughtering of animals by Christians, as the reason given in the Talmud for forbidding the slaughtering of animals by pagans did not apply to Christians; for the pagan regarded the slaughtering as a sacrifice to his idols, while the same could not be said of the Christians.

Dan, who was a person of much individuality, was misunderstood by many, and acts were ascribed to him which he certainly did not commit. Adret's five responsa show that Dan was not a man to be overlooked; Adret's successor as rabbi of Barcelona, Nissim ben Reuben, also recognizes Dan's scholarship. Yom-Ṭob b. Abraham of Seville (RIṬBA) calls Dan "our teacher", although this did not prevent him from writing a pamphlet against Dan regarding their dispute over an important halakic question.

Dan was also very independent as an exegete; the fragments of his exegesis that have been preserved in manuscript, and also in the works of Baḥya ben Asher and in the collection "Hadrat Zeḳenim", are highly interesting on account of their rationalism, which was not to be expected from one who had allowed himself to be misled by a false prophet. For instance, he interpreted מלאך, in Ex. xxiii. 20, as "messenger," not "angel," and supposed it to refer to Joshua. In the collection of responsa "Besamim Rosh," which Saul Berlin published as Asher ben Jehiel's work, the statement is made that Dan wrote his Tefillin in Aramaic.

== Jewish Encyclopedia bibliography ==
- Fuenn, Keneset Yisrael;
- S. Eppenstein, in Rev. Et. Juives, xxxvii. 318;
- D. Kaufmann, R. Dan Aschkenasi Exégète, in Rev. Et. Juives, xxxvi. 287–291;
- Perles, R. Salomo b. Abraham, pp. 9, 63;
- Kohn, Mordechai b. Hillel, pp. 37, 38.L. G
