= Dürener Jazztage =

Dürener Jazztage is an annual jazz festival held in Düren near Cologne, Germany. Since 1991, the former Dürener Jazzclub has organized summer festivals over several days with bands playing at different venues around the town. In 2018, following a merger with Planet Jazz, the event has been publicized under Planet Jazz Club Düren.

Thanks to the involvement of sponsors, most of the concerts and presentations are accessible free of charge. Up to 15,000 visitors, mostly from the surrounding area but some from further afield, attend each year.
