= Mordechai ben Hillel =

German rabbi (d. 1298)

Mordechai ben Hillel HaKohen (Hebrew: "המָּרְדֳּכַי" ,רבי מרדכי בן הלל הכהן; c. 1250–1298), also known as The Mordechai or, by some Sephardic scholars, as The Mordechie, was a 13th-century German rabbi and posek. His chief legal commentary on the Talmud, referred to as The Mordechai, is one of the sources of the Shulchan Aruch. He was killed in the Rintfleisch massacres in 1298.

== Biography ==
Little is known of Mordechai's early life. He belonged to one of the most prominent families of scholars in Germany: his grandfather Hillel, on his mother's side, was a grandson of Eliezer ben Joel ha-Levi, who was in turn a grandson of Eliezer ben Nathan. Mordechai was also a relative of Rabbi Asher ben Jehiel. He was a son-in-law of R' Yechiel of Paris. He was married to Zelda, with whom he had five children.

His principal teacher was Meir ben Baruch of Rothenburg; he was also taught by Perez ben Elijah of Corbeil, Ephraim ben Nathan, Abraham ben Baruch (Meir of Rothenburg's brother), and Dan Ashkenazi. In addition to his knowledge of Talmud and Halakha, the Mordechai was also an expert on Hebrew grammar.

About 1291 the family moved to Goslar. But his right of residence there was disputed by a certain Moses Tako (not the famous Moses Taku); although the suit was decided in Mordechai's favor, it was conducted with such bitterness that Mordechai left Goslar and settled at Nuremberg. For the next seven years, he operated a Yeshiva there which attracted students from all over Europe. The Mordechai was murdered, along with his wife and children, in the Rintfleisch Massacres; see Nuremberg: Middle Ages.

== Works ==
=== Magnum opus ===
Mordechai is a prominent legal (Halachic) work, which acquired wide authority, and was one of the sources of the Shulchan Aruch of Joseph Caro; it has also been printed as an appendix to the Talmud, since the Soncino edition of 1482. The work is written as a compilation of existing halakhic material, and also provides conclusions and results of long discussions in other works. It thus serves as both a source of analysis, as well a source of decided law. Mordechai's knowledge of halakhic literature was extensive. He quotes the works, and written or verbal responsa, of about 350 authorities; in fact, Mordechai is now the only source for many Ashkenazi authors. He frequently quotes his teacher, Meir ben Baruch, and much of the Mordechai is written in support of the Tosafists, the last of whom were Mordechai's teachers.

The Ashkenazi authorities, as well as those in Italy, were great admirers of Mordechai, and assiduously studied the Mordechai and recognized its authority as a source of Halakha. Moses Isserles lectured on the Mordechai in his yeshivah, and many of his responsa are devoted to questions regarding difficult passages of the book. Its status was such, that the Mordechai is one of the sources of the Shulchan Aruch of Joseph Caro. In Italy and Poland, where the Mordechai was especially studied, a whole Mordechai literature came into existence.

The Mordechai, although linked textually with the Halakhot of Rabbi Isaac Alfasi, is, in fact, an independent work. The connection with Alfasi is partly an external one: single sentences, sometimes even single words, of the Halakhot serve as "catchwords" introducing the relevant material found in the Jerusalem Talmud, the tosafot, as well as other codices and compendiums. Another connection is the extensive quotations from Rabbi Alfasi in the body of the text. This second connection is, however, not always apparent, for reasons explained in the second next paragraph.

The Mordechai is published in two forms: glosses to Alfasi's "Halakhot" in various manuscripts, and also as an appendix to the "Halakhot" - the standard form in today's editions of the Talmud.

As early critics pointed out, the Mordechai was not issued in its final form by the Mordechai. He collected the material, but the work was in fact arranged and published by his pupils, partly during his lifetime and partly after his death. Thus within two generations after Mordechai's death there were two entirely different versions of his work, respectively designated as the "Rhenish" and the "Austrian" versions. These two versions are also respectively known as the "Short Mordechai" (מרדכי הקצר Mordekhai haKetzar) and "Long Mordechai" (מרדכי הארוך Mordekhai ha'Arokh), due to their varying length. These are essentially two copies of the Mordechai, but whereas the Austrian Mordechai is undoubtedly the original form of the work, the Rhenish version has been extensively, almost drastically, abridged, including the removal of most references to Rabbi Alfasi's work. The version published in the Talmud is the Rhenish one with glosses from the Austrian Mordechai, by Rabbi Samuel ben Aaron of Schlettstadt. Fortunately, a complete edition, i.e. the Austrian version, has recently been published.

=== Other works ===
Mordechai was the author of Responsa - however, these have not been preserved but are quoted in other works and responsa; see: History of Responsa: Twelfth century.

He authored several selichot.
