= Düren =

Town in North Rhine-Westphalia, Germany

- Town
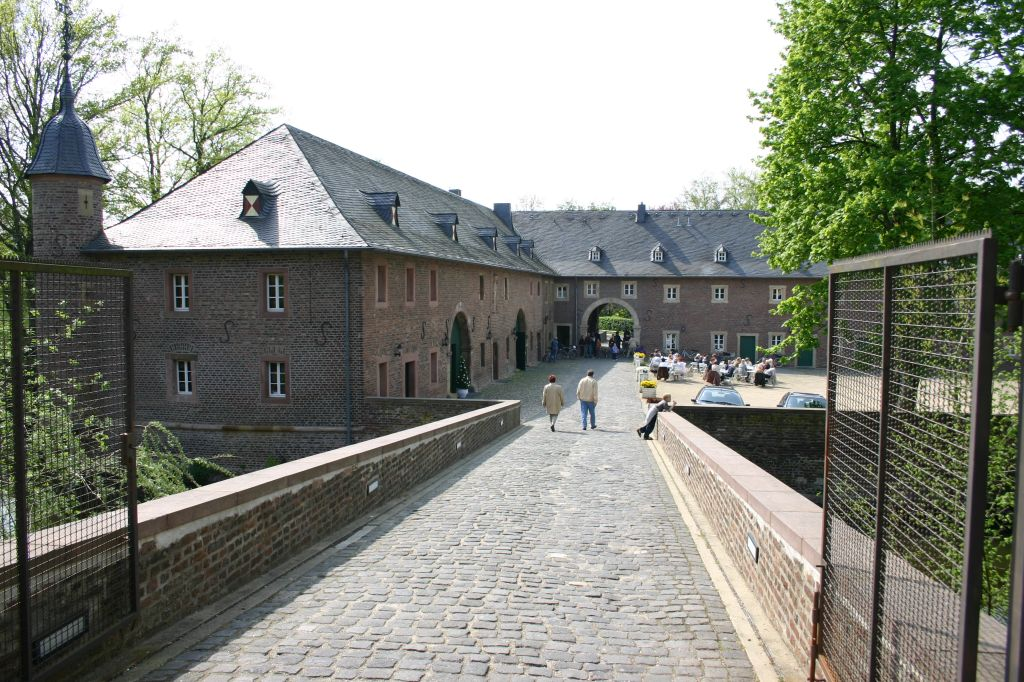
- View of Burgau Castle

- Flag Coat of arms

- Location of Düren within Düren district
- Interactive map of Düren
- Location within Germany Location within North Rhine-Westphalia
- Coordinates: 50°48′N 6°29′E
- Country: Germany
- State: North Rhine-Westphalia
- Admin. region: Köln
- District: Düren
- Subdivisions: 15

Government
  - Mayor (2025–30): Frank Peter Ullrich (SPD)

Area
  - Total: 85 km^{2} (33 sq mi)
- Elevation: 125 m (410 ft)

Population (2025-12-31)
  - Total: 94,539
  - Density: 1,100/km^{2} (2,900/sq mi)
- Time zone: UTC+01:00 (CET)
  - Summer (DST): UTC+02:00 (CEST)
- Postal codes: 52349/52351/52353/52355
- Dialling codes: 02421
- Vehicle registration: DN
- Website: www.dueren.de

Düren (German pronunciation: [ˈdyːʁən]; Ripuarian: Düre) is a town in North Rhine-Westphalia, Germany, between Aachen and Cologne, on the river Rur.

== History ==
=== Roman era ===
Before Roman conquest, the area of Düren had been settled by the Eburones, a people who were described as both Celts and Germani. Gaius Julius Caesar described it as part of Gallia Belgica. It was conquered by the Roman Republic under Julius Caesar and became part of Germania inferior. The Romans encouraged the settlement of loyal Ubii in the Jülich-Zülpich Börde. May be, the name "Düren" refers to the hamlet "Marcodurum", situated 4 km north of nowadays downtown Düren.

The Jülich-Zülpicher Börde (nowadays the Düren area) became a supply area for the rapidly growing Roman city of Cologne (Roman name Colonia Claudia Ara Agrippinensium). Furthermore, a few important Roman roads skirt Düren (including the road from Cologne to Jülich and Tongeren and the road from Cologne to Zülpich and Trier). During the Migration Period in the 4th and 5th centuries, Rhenish Franks, also called Ripuarian Franks invaded the Jülich-Zülpich Börde and took control. The name villa duria occurred the first time in the Frankish Annals in the year 747.

Frankish king Pippin the Short often visited Düren in the 8th century and held a few important conventions there. The Franks made of Düren a Königspfalz/royal palace (part time residence), from which the name Palatine (Pfalz in German) is derived. Charlemagne sojourned a few times there. Due to the frequent visits of Charlemagne, a few markets sprang up, such as the Grain, cattle, wood, chicken, and butter markets, all of which contributed to Düren's development. The castle was built at the place where, since 1991, the Saint Anne Church is located.

=== Middle Ages ===
Düren obtained city rights in the early 13th century. Around 1200, the construction of the city wall was started, which includes 12 towers and 5 gates. But it lost its status as a free imperial city 1242 and become secondary main town of the County of Juelich. The gates faced all directions: in the north, the Philippstor and the Wirteltor, in the east the Kölntor (Cologne gate), in the south the Obertor and in the west the Holztor (wooden gate). There are still ruins of the gates today.

The chiseler Leonhard stole a small box with the relic of Saint Anne out of the Mainzer Stiftskirche St. Stephan in 1501 and brought it to Düren. Pope Julius II decided on March 18, 1506, that Düren could keep the remains. They were kept in the Martinskirche (church of Saint Martin) which was renamed the Annakirche (church of Saint Anne) in 1505. (Probably the church was renamed much later, because in the 19th century it was still called sometimes parish church of the holy Martinus). Saint Anne became the patron saint of Düren. Every year, the saint's day of Saint Anne (July 26) is celebrated for one week with the Anna octavos and the Anna parish fair, one of the biggest folk festivals of Germany.

=== 17th to 19th century ===
View of Düren in 1945, following the heavy Allied aerial bombing

During the Thirty Years' War, Wolfgang Wilhelm, Count Palatine of Neuburg was Duke of Jülich. The Duchy of Jülich tried to keep neutrality, but it wasn't recognized by the belligerents. The Duchy of Jülich had to accept Spanish occupation. In 1642, Düren was embroiled in the Battle of Kempen. Opposing troops destroyed the city. After the war has finally ended in 1648, plague broke out and caused many lives to be lost. A second plague epidemic broke out in 1665. Due to the various attacks on the debilitated city, Düren was destroyed again in 1689 while Nine Years' War. In this time, the settlement Miesheim was destroyed, never to be rebuilt.

Towards the end of the year 1755 in the area around Düren and Aachen began a series of earthquakes, which reached its peak on February 18, 1756 with an earthquake with the strength 8 on the Mercalli scale. The series of earthquakes affected all of Europe, most famously the 1755 Lisbon earthquake.

The businesses in the area of Düren was affected since the 15th century by the drapery and metal industry. Since the beginning of the 17th century, paper industry had settled here, advantaged by the exceptionally soft water of the Rur. Rütger von Scheven built the first paper mill in Düren. In 1812, there were already 17 paper factories, 11 cloth- and blanket factories, an iron rolling mill or slitting mill and two iron foundries.

In the year 1794, Düren was occupied by French revolutionary troops, while Battle of Aldenhoven. From 1798 until 1814, Düren was the main city of the same named canton in the arrondissement Aachen of the French Roerdepartements (from the name of the River Rur (Roer) and département). After the Congress of Vienna in 1815, Düren was ceded to the Kingdom of Prussia and was subsequently administered within the Rhine Province.

=== 20th century ===
By 1900, Düren was among Germany's richest cities (with 42 millionaires and 93 factories) and had a population of 27,168. By comparison, fewer than 5,000 people had lived in Düren a century earlier.

The city of Düren was located on the main fighting front during the Allied invasion of Germany in World War II. During 1944 and 1945, the protracted and bloody Battle for Hürtgenwald was fought on Düren's district area, and on November 16, 1944, Düren was completely destroyed by Allied air bombings. Approximately 22,000 people lived in Düren at that time, and 3,000 of them died during the bombing. Those who survived were evacuated to central Germany. Destroyed buildings included the Stadttheater Düren (1907), designed in Jugendstil by Carl Moritz.

By 1939, the population had risen to over 45,000, but then fell to just 3,806 by June 1945 due to the effects of World War II. After the bombing of November 16, 1944, on March 1, 1945, only four German residents lived in the city, including forced laborers etc. there were 21 people. On April 1, the number of inhabitants had risen to 180 and on May 1, 1945, there were already 1,218 people. In December 1945 the number increased to 25,000 inhabitants and in 1958 it was 45,000, the same number as before the war. Due to the incorporation of several places in the area, the city's population grew on January 1, 1972, by 35,522 to 89,087.

On February 23, 1945, U.S. troops crossed the Rur at Düren. After the war was over in the summer that year, many evacuated people came back to the destroyed city and started to rebuild their homes against the advice of the American troops. By June 1945, the population had risen to 3,806. Most of the architecture in Düren therefore dates from the 1950s.

Düren became part of the British occupation zone in Germany June 1945. By Ordinance No. 46 the British Military Government created the state of Nordrhein/Westfalen. 1949, Düren became part of the Federal Republic of Germany.

== Geography ==
Düren is situated in the Jülich-Zülpich Börde at the north end of the Eifel, within the lowland of the Roer. The south east reaches the north end of the Drover Heath.

Town districts of Düren (Selection):

Arnoldsweiler, a rural village 3 km north of Düren down town, mentioned in 10th century.

Merken, a rural village 4 km northwest of Düren down town, mentioned about 1300, situated at the Roer below Düren main city area

Echtz-Konzendorf, originally two villages, both mentioned before the year 1000, 3 km northwest of Düren down town

Derichsweiler, a rural village 3 km west of Düren down town, is also mentioned before the year 1000.

Lendersdorf, 2 km south of Düren down town, situated at the Roer above Düren main city area.

== Demographics ==
Historical population

Year	Pop.	±% p.a.
1965	85,901	—
1970	88,063	+0.50%
1975	87,779	−0.06%
1980	85,907	−0.43%
1985	84,276	−0.38%
1990	86,508	+0.52%
1995	90,274	+0.86%

Year	Pop.	±% p.a.
2000	91,801	+0.34%
2005	93,656	+0.40%
2010	92,820	−0.18%
2015	90,244	−0.56%
2020	91,272	+0.23%
2025	94,539	+0.71%

Source: Landesdatabank Nordrhein-Westfalen

View chart definition.

== Culture and points of interest ==
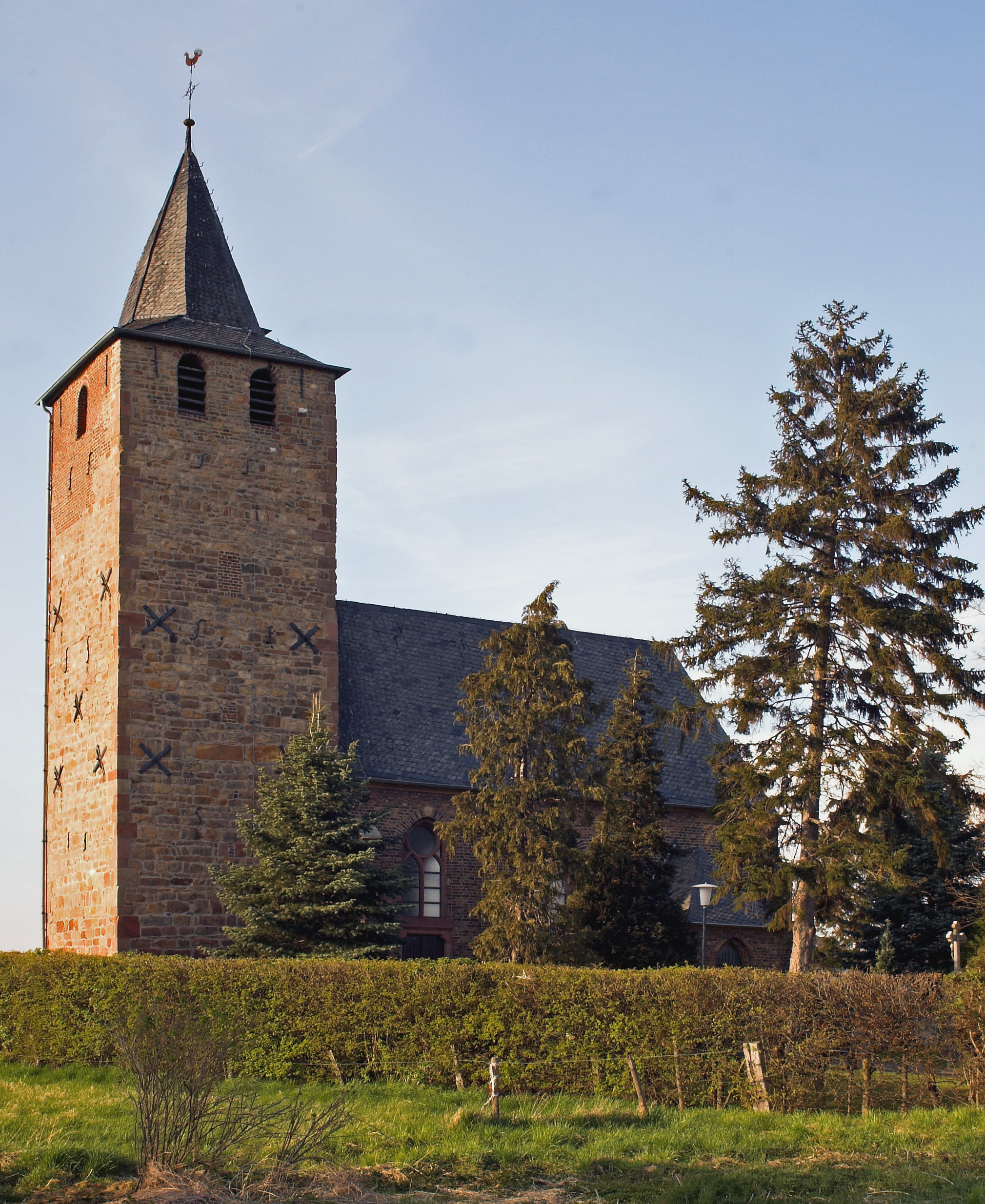
Eulendom

The most famous museum of Düren is the Leopold Hoesch Museum. The Baroque Revival style building erected in 1905 presents changing exhibitions of contemporary art. Since 1986, it also displays artworks from the international Biennale PaperArt. Since 2006, the former nurses' home of the St. Augustinus Hospital Lendersdorf has housed the Düren Carnival Museum. The most recent museum is the Stadtmuseum Düren local history museum, founded in 2009.

== Theatre and music ==
The former Stadttheater Düren was opened in January 1907. In the bombing of November 16, 1944, the theatre was almost completely destroyed. Today cultural performances take place mainly at the Haus der Stadt. Since 2004 the multi-functional Arena Kreis Düren, which has around 2000 seats, serves as a venue for major concerts.

The jazz festival Dürener Jazztage is hosted in Düren annually.

== Buildings ==
At the edge of the forest in the Niederau district lies Burgau Castle. The water castle was inhabited by the Counts of Heinsberg at the beginning of the 14th Century. After it was destroyed in 1944, the restoration process lasted from 1979 to 1998. In Theodor Heuss Park is the Bismarck Memorial, erected in 1892 to commemorate the most famous honorary citizen from Düren. The town hall was inaugurated in 1959. It now ranks as an example of 1950s architecture under Cultural heritage management.

== Politics ==
The current mayor of Düren is Frank Peter Ullrich of the Social Democratic Party (SPD) since 2020. The most recent mayoral election was held on 14 September 2025, with a runoff held on 27 September, and the results were as follows:

Candidate	Party	First round	
Candidate	Party	Votes	%
Frank Peter Ullrich	Social Democratic Party	17,088	55.21
Georg Hamm	Christian Democratic Union	13,863	44.79
Valid votes		30,951	93.57
Invalid votes		2,126	6.43
Total		33,077	100.0
Electorate/voter turnout		68,400	48.36
Source: City of Düren

=== City council ===
Results of the 2020 city council election

The Düren city council governs the city alongside the Mayor. The most recent city council election was held on 14 September 2025, and the results were as follows:

Party	Votes	%	±	Seats	±
Christian Democratic Union (CDU)	10,697	32.70	▼0.6	17	▼0
Social Democratic Party (SPD)	8,802	26.91	▼1.89	14	▼1
Alliance 90/The Greens (Grüne)	2,717	8.31	▼9.52	4	▼5
Alternative for Germany (AfD)	6,221	19.02	▲11.92	10	▲6
Free Democratic Party (FDP)	524	1.6	▼2.9	1	▼1
Citizens for Düren (BfD)	906	2.77	▼0.43	1	▼1
The Left (Die Linke)	1,583	4.84	▲2.04	3	▲2
Pirate Party Germany (Piraten)	303	0.93	▼0.37	0	▼1
Future Germany (ZD)	444	1.36	new	1	new
Independent Harf	292	0.89	▼0.21	1	▼0
Valid votes	32,715	98.88			
Invalid votes	371	1.12			
Total	33,086	100.0		52	▲0
Electorate/voter turnout	68,400	48.37	▲6.67		

== Religion ==
- The most important church in the city is the Annakirche. The church was completely destroyed by bombing in 1944 and rebuilt in the 1950s under the guidance of the architect Rudolf Schwarz. Throughout the city there are 15 other Catholic parish and church communities, including in Arnoldsweiler.
- The most important Protestant church in Düren is the Christuskirche. At its inauguration in 1954, it possessed the highest freestanding bell tower in Germany.
- Up to the destruction of Kristallnacht, the synagogue was located in Schützenstraße. In its place is now a stele from Düren artist Rückriem.

== Main sights ==
- Burgau Castle (German: Schloss Burgau)
- Dicker Turm ("Fat Tower"), a remain of the old city's fortifications
- Annakirche (St. Anne Church)
- Marienkirche (St. Mary Magdalene Church)
- Monument to Bismarck
- Leopold Hoesch Museum

== Emblem ==
The emblem of the city of Düren is divided. It shows on the top a red castle, below that, a black eagle and in the lower half a black lion with a red tongue. The black eagle refers to the old history of Düren as a royal city and Reichsstadt. In 1242–46 Düren was bonded to the dukes of Jülich (later, Napoleon was also Duke of Jülich). Their emblem was a lion passant, with open mouth and a red tongue.

== Twin towns – sister cities ==
Düren is twinned with:

- Altmünster, Austria
- Cormeilles, France
- Gradačac, Bosnia and Herzegovina
- Jinhua, China
- Karadeniz Ereğli, Turkey
- Stryi, Ukraine
- Valenciennes, France

== Media ==
Düren has its own radio station (Radio Rur). The station broadcasts on 92.7 and 107.5 MHz, and on cable at 87.5 MHz. There are two daily newspapers (Dürener Zeitung, Dürener Nachrichten) and several weekly papers.

== Transport ==
=== Railway ===
Station building in Düren

Düren station is served by several RB and RE lines, also line S19 of Cologne S-Bahn has its final stop here. Düren is located in the area of the fare association Rheinland-Tarif

=== Air ===
The nearest airports to Düren are:

- Cologne Bonn Airport, located 61.3 km (38 mi) east.
- Maastricht Aachen Airport, located 64 km (40 mi) west.
- Düsseldorf Airport, located 99 km (62 mi) north east.

== Notable people ==
- Isaac ben Meir Halevi of Düren (13th century rabbi), author of Shaarei Dura
- Samson ben Samuel (14th century rabbi)
- Karl Benrath (1845–1924), Church historian
- Johann Bollig (born 1821), Pontifical Theologian and advisor to Pope Pius IX
- Marita Breuer (born 1953), actress
- Klaus H. Carl (born 1935), photographer
- Manfred Donike (1933–1995), cyclist
- Gert Engels (born 1957), football coach
- Johannes Engels (born 1959), historian
- Simon Ernst (born 1994), handball player
- Margot Eskens (born 1939), Schlager singer
- Klaus Esser (born 1981), German politician (AfD)
- Jerome Felton (born 1987), American football player
- Gossen, Hermann Heinrich (1810–1858), Prussian economist
- Georg Hamel (1877–1954), mathematician
- Wilfried Hannes (born 1957), football player
- Ute Hasse (born 1963), swimmer, Olympic silver medal
- Rudolf Henke (born 1954), MP
- Leopold Hoesch (1820–1899), founder of Hoesch AG in Dortmund, and founder of the Leopold Hoesch Museum in Düren
- Friedrich Honigmann (1841–1913), mining entrepreneur
- Karin Jacobsen (1924–1989), actress and screenwriter
- Harald Konopka (born 1952), football player
- Karl Lauterbach (born 1963), economist and politician
- Peter Gustav Lejeune Dirichlet (1805–1859), mathematician
- Michael Lentz (born 1964), writer and musician
- Christoph Moritz (born 1990), football player
- Peter Nellen (1912–1969), politician
- Kalle Pohl (born 1951), comedian
- Eugen Prym (1843–1913), orientalist and linguist
- Friedrich Prym (1841–1915), mathematician and musician
- Sven Schaffrath (born 1984), football player
- Karl-Heinz Schnellinger (1939–2024), football player
- Max von Schillings (1868–1933), conductor and composer
- Sybille Schmitz (1909–1955), German film star
- Rudolf Schock (1915–1986), opera singer
- Rudolf Schoeller (1902–1978), Swiss racing driver
- Harald Schumacher (born 1954), football player with 1. FC Köln and Germany national
- Hermann Schwarz (1864–1951), philosopher
- Georg Stollenwerk (born 1927), football player
- Stephan Thiemonds (born 1971), writer
- Lars Vogt (1970–2022), pianist
- Paul J. J. Welfens (1957–2022), economist
