= Johann Bollig =

Advisor to Pope Pius IX (1821–1895)

- Born: 23 August 1821; Rhenish, Prussia
- Died: 9 March 1895 (aged 73); Rome, Italy
- Occupations: Theologian, professor
- Theological work
- Era: 19th century, First Vatican Council
- Tradition or movement: Roman Catholic, Jesuit

Johann Bollig (23 August 1821 – 9 March 1895) was a German advisor of Pope Pius IX in the lead up to the First Vatican Council. Bollig was born near Düren, Rhenish Prussia, and died in Rome, Italy. Prior to his time as a Pontifical Theologian he served as a theology professor in Syria.
