= Wehebach =

River in Germany

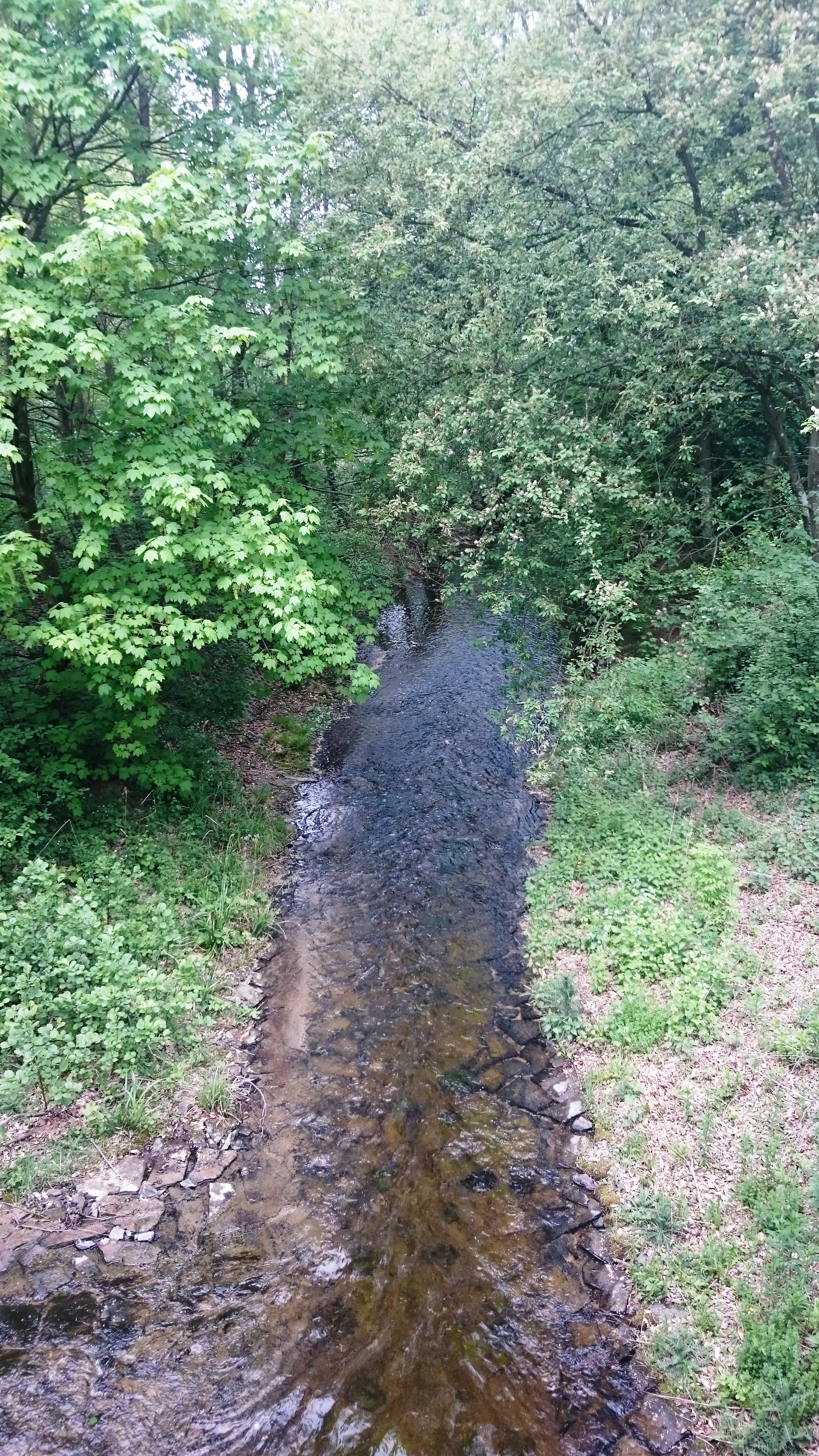

Location
- Country: Germany
- State: North Rhine-Westphalia

Physical characteristics
- Mouth
  - location: Inde
  - coordinates: 50.8476°N 6.3564°E
- Length: 25.7 km (16.0 mi)
- Basin size: 68 km^{2} (26 sq mi)

Basin features
- Progression: Inde→ Rur→ Meuse→ North Sea

Wehebach is a river of North Rhine-Westphalia, Germany. It flows into the Inde in Inden.

== See also ==
- List of rivers of North Rhine-Westphalia
