= Sand geyser =

Geologic phenomenon

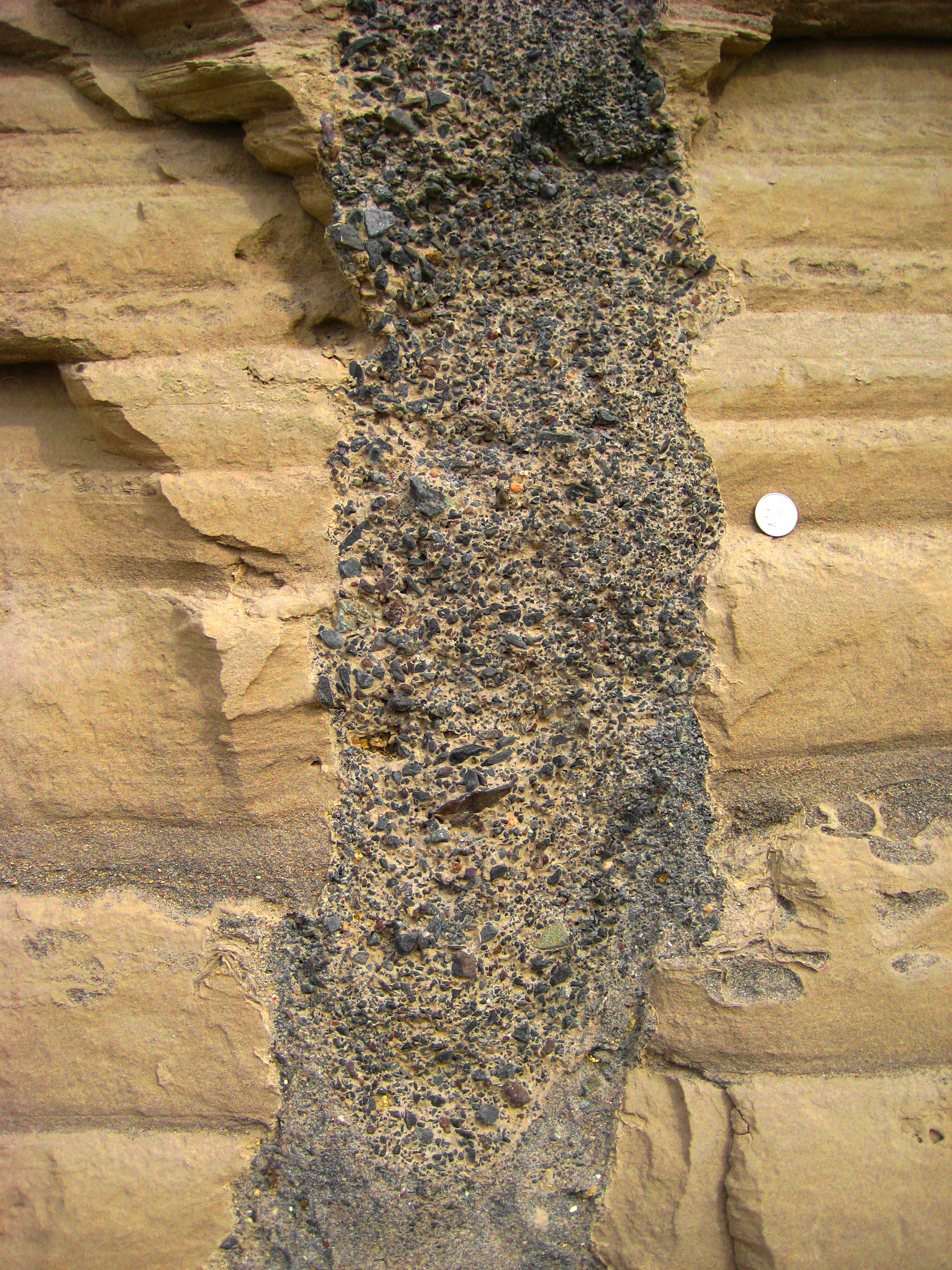
A Clastic dike, the result of a sand geyser event.

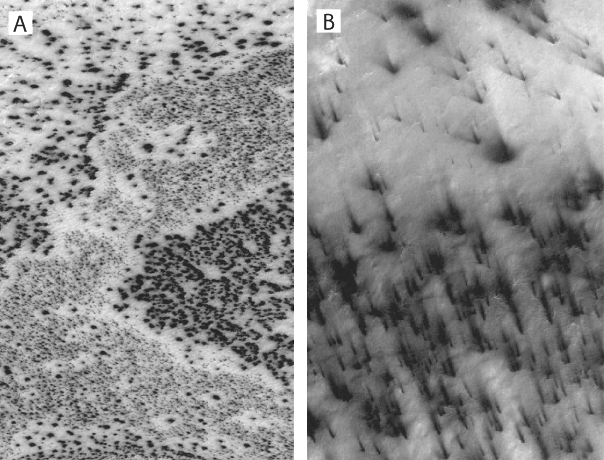
Sand geysers identified by NASA on the Martian surface.

A sand geyser, sand fountain or sand blow is a geologic phenomenon which occurs in association with earthquakes and other seismic events. In the geologic record, these are seen as clastic dikes. It is described as "a geyser of sand and water that shoots from the ground during a major earthquake." A quake can cause underlying sand to liquefy while pressure forces the eruption of the sand mixture to the surface. The mixture of sand and water can also contain dissolved gases such as methane and carbon dioxide.

Some investigators have located soil formations that indicate the existence of past sand geysers in earthquake prone areas.

NASA has proposed that the existence of sand geysers on the surface of Mars explains some of the seasonal variations of light and dark areas. Plume-like markings that begin to appear during the martian spring may be caused by solid CO_{2} transforming explosively into its gaseous state causing an eruption of soil materials.

A 2008 video recorded one eruption in Saudi Arabia. Another lay commentator attributed a similar event to differences in air temperature between underground pockets of air and the air above the ground. The phenomenon was observed during an earthquake in New Zealand in 1987.
