= Jülich-Zülpich Börde =

Landscape in North Rhine-Westphalia, Germany

The Jülich-Zülpich Börde (German: Jülich-Zülpicher Börde, pronounced [ˈjyːlɪç ˈtsʏlpɪçɐ ˈbœʁdə]) is a landscape in the Rhineland in the German state of North Rhine-Westphalia on the northern edge of the Eifel. It forms the western part of the Lower Rhine Bay, west of the Rhine, excluding the actual Cologne Lowland, from which it is separated by the ridge of the Ville. It is divided into the Jülich Börde (Jülicher Börde) around the town of Jülich in the north and the Zülpich Börde (Zülpicher Börde) around the town of Zülpich in the south, the two areas being separated from one another by the Bürge forest. Both parts are natural region major units of the Lower Rhine Bay.

The Jülich-Zülpich Börde covers areas in the counties of Euskirchen, Düren, Rhein-Erft-Kreis and parts of Rhein-Sieg-Kreis, the county of Heinsberg and the borough of Aachen. The two börde regions are also referred to as the Rhenish Börde Zone (Rheinische Bördenzone).

The north of the Jülich Börde around Erkelenz is locally called the Erkelenz Börde (Erkelenzer Börde).

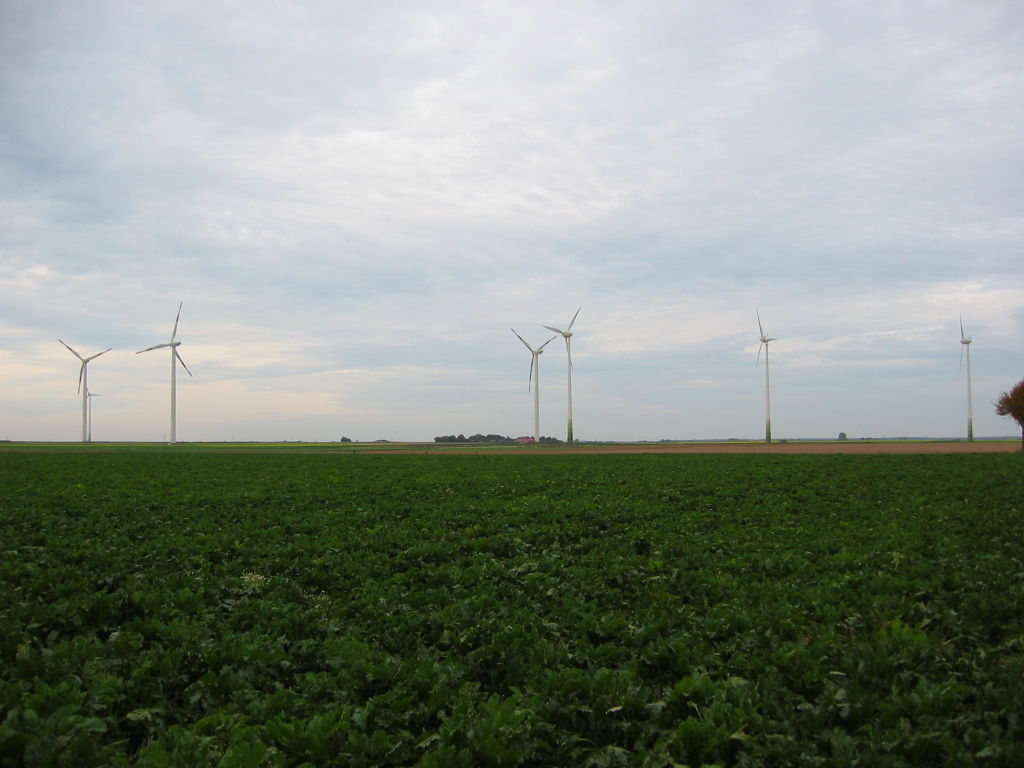
Sugar beet field and wind farm near Linnich

== Literature ==
- Stadt Erkelenz (publ.): Kulturlandschaft Erkelenzer Börde. Gestaltete Heimat. Erkelenz, 1990, ISBN 3-7743-0799-7.
- Friedel Krings: Die Erkelenzer Börde. In: Heimatkalender der Erkelenzer Lande. Erkelenz, 1953.
- Arndt, Hartwig: Sozio-ökonomische Wandlungen im Agrarwirtschaftsraum der Jülich-Zülpicher Börde. (= Kölner Forschungen zur Wirtschafts- und Sozialgeographie. Vol. 26). Cologne, 1980, ISBN 3-921790-04-2.
- Hans Becker: Die Jülich-Zülpicher Börde zwischen Erft und Rur In: Kölner Bucht und angrenzende Gebiete. (= Sammlung Geographischer Führer. Vol. 6). Verlag Bornträger, Berlin/ Stuttgart, 1972, pp. 83 ff.
- Elisabeth Zenses: Die Jülich-Zülpicher Börde. (= Landschaften zwischen Rhein und Eifel. Vol. 1). Verlag Zweckverband Naturpark Kottenforst-Ville, 1999.
