= Karl Benrath =

German historian (1845–1924)

- Born: 10 August 1845; Düren, North Rhine-Westphalia, Germany
- Died: 21 July 1924 (aged 78); Königsberg
- Occupation: Church historian

Karl Benrath (10 August 1845 in Düren – 21 July 1924 in Königsberg) was a German church historian.

Benrath was educated in Bonn, Berlin and Heidelberg. In 1871 went on a scientific tour of several years to Italy and England. From 1879 he was professor at Bonn, and from 1890 professor of church history at Königsberg.

His most important works describe 16th century reformation movement in Northern Italy.

== Sources ==
- Mennonite Encyclopedia, Vol. 1, p. 274. Online at .
