= Samuel ben Aaron Schlettstadt =

Samuel ben Aaron Schlettstadt (שמואל בן אהרן שלטשטט) was a 14th century German rabbi. He was born in Schlettstadt and known to live in Strasbourg in the latter half of the 14th century. He was a rosh yeshiva of a yeshiva in Strasbourg.

== Trials and Exile ==
In about 1370, the Jewish community of Strasbourg had two accused moserim who had been informing the knights of Andlau about the community. Schlettstadt constituted a court against these two men, and the court eventually sentenced these men to death. They were successful in carrying out the sentence against one of them, named Salamin. The other escaped, converted to Christianity and informed the knights of the proceedings. The knights along with an armed mob came to Strasbourg for the purpose of exacting vengeance on Schlettstadt, who was able to secure refuge in the castle of Hohelandsberg, near Colmar. He petitioned the leaders of the community to intervene on his behalf; such intervention did not come and he remained in confinement for six years.

Schlettstadt left his hiding place in 1376 and traveled to Babylonia where he brought a complaint before the nasi against the leaders of the Strasbourg community. He then visited Jerusalem. With the support of the rabbinate of Jerusalem, the nasi wrote a cherem. The identity of the writer of the ban seems to be unknown. There are sources that believe the nasi mentioned here was the Exilarch David ben Hodiah, but this is not possible as Hodiah lived two centuries earlier.

== Return from exile ==
Armed with this ban, Schlettstadt returned to Germany and sojourned at Ratisbon. The rabbis of Ratisbon wrote to the chiefs of the Strasburg community begging them to use all their energy in obtaining permission for Schlettstadt's return, and threatening that otherwise they would be put under the ban. As a result the desired permission was at length granted and Schlettstadt was allowed to return to Strasbourg. It is not known how long Schlettstadt lived after this event; but, as the narrator of the foregoing events a few years later (c. 1380) all the Jews of Strasburg were massacred, it is possible that Schlettstadt perished together with his community.

== Writing ==
Schlettstadt is particularly known for his abridgment, entitled "Kitzur Mordechai" or "Mordechai ha-Katan" (still unpublished), of Mordechai ben Hillel's "Sefer ha-Mordechai." Both Carmoly and Grätz think that Schlettstadt wrote the work in the fortress of Hohelandsberg. Although Schlettstadt generally followed Mordechai b. Hillel, yet in certain instances he deviated from his predecessor, and he also added certain laws that are not found in the "Sefer ha-Mordechai."
