= Peter Münstermann =

German politician

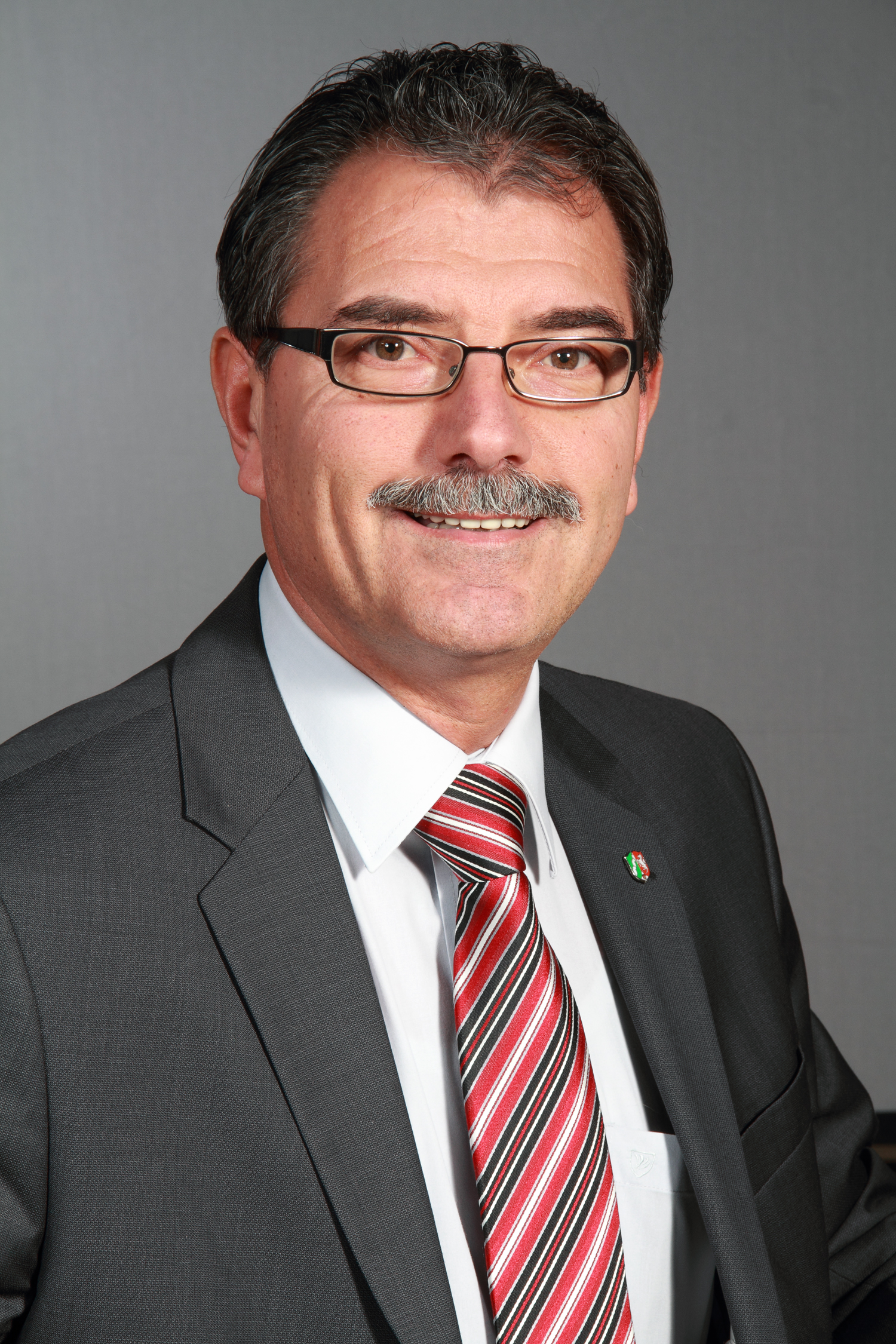
Peter Münstermann

Peter Münstermann (born 3 August 1956) is a German politician of the Social Democratic Party of Germany (SPD) party. He is an elected member of the Landtag of North Rhine-Westphalia since 2012. He announced to resign in 2017.
