= Fürth Yeshiva =

- ישיבת פיורדא
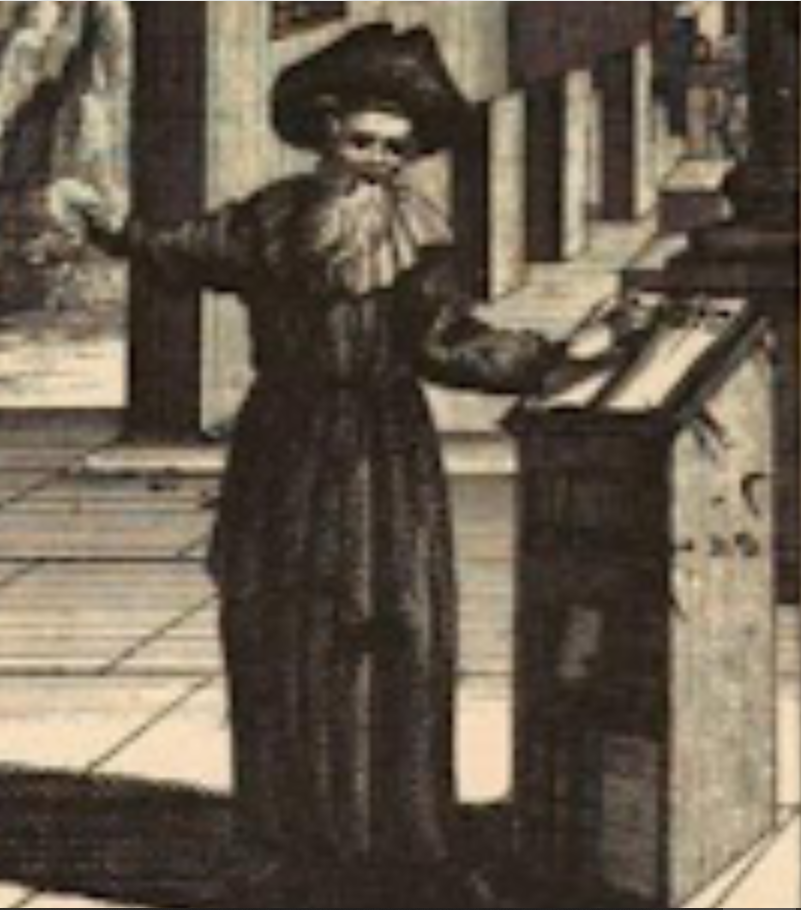
- The Rosh Yeshiva of Fürth delivering a general lecture. An engraving from the time of Rabbi Baruch Kahane Rappaport.
- Nuremberg, Fürth; Holy Roman Empire

Information
- School type: Yeshiva
- Religious affiliation: Jewish
- Established: 13th century
- Closed: August 1830

The Fürth Yeshiva (Hebrew: ישיבת פיורדא, during the period of the Rishonim: the Nuremberg Yeshiva) was a yeshiva held by the Jewish community that existed in Nuremberg, and after the expulsion of the Jews from it on March 9, 1499 – in the city of Fürth in Germany, within the Jewish community in these cities. The yeshiva was one of the largest yeshivas in the Jewish world at its time and one of the oldest yeshivas in Europe. At its peak, 600 students studied at the yeshiva, a number unmatched by any other yeshiva in Europe. The yeshiva produced hundreds of rabbis, and dozens of rabbis who were among the greatest rabbis of their generation stood at its head. The Fürth Yeshiva was brutally closed in 1830 by the police.

== History ==
=== The period of the Rishonim ===
A yeshiva existed in Nuremberg as early as the period of the Baalei Tosafot (authors of the Tosafot commentaries on the Talmud). The yeshiva developed and became famous starting from the generation of Rabbeinu Meir of Rothenburg, who served as its Rosh Yeshiva. The students of the yeshiva ate and slept with members of the community and in the rabbi's home. After the Maharam, his student Mordechai ben Hillel served as the Rosh Yeshiva. He was murdered in Nuremberg among the 740 Jews who were Rintfleisch-Pogrom massacres in 1298. During that period, the yeshiva followed the study method of the Beit Midrash of the Baalei Tosafot.

Starting from the time of the Mordechai, it is likely that they engaged in the study of the halakhic and Minhag books of the Rishonim, especially the Sefer Mordechai itself. Several heads of the Nuremberg Yeshiva are sometimes mentioned in the glosses of the Mordechai due to their annotations and manuscripts on the book, including Rabbi Isaac Stein and Rabbi Meir Wirshillier-Fürstlein. In 1409, 562 Jews were murdered in the city, including two of the community's rabbis. In those days, it was customary for two rabbis to serve as heads of the yeshiva. From 1383 to 1385, the Maharam Sal, one of the greatest rabbis of that generation, served as the Rosh Yeshiva, and at the same time, another small yeshiva was opened in Nuremberg. In 1403, a schism developed in the community led by the two heads of the yeshiva, Rabbi Koppelmann ben Zeklein and Rabbi Israel. After some time, a compromise was reached that each rabbi would give his lesson on a different day of the week alternately. In 1408, the yeshiva was closed due to the demand of the city council and the decrees of King Gophrecht. Around 1416, it was reopened, and Rabbi Zalman Katz (Maharazach) headed it until 1444. Rabbi Jacob Weil also taught at the yeshiva during that period. After them, Rabbi David Tavli Schprinz served as the Rosh Yeshiva, followed by Rabbi Jacob Margolioth. During that time, the method of study in Germany followed the "Hilukim" (analytical distinctions) method, which developed, among other places, in the Nuremberg Yeshiva. A student of the yeshiva, Rabbi Jacob Pollak, greatly developed it and transferred it to the yeshivas of Eastern Europe. A remnant of the yeshiva's study method is the "Nuremberger," a specific style of question in the Talmud. On March 9, 1499, the Jews of Nuremberg were expelled and moved to Fürth ("Fyorda" in their language), where they re-established their community's yeshiva. In the Second Nuremberg Haggadah, there are several illustrations related to the yeshiva and its heads, and it is possible that the illustrator was inspired by the Nuremberg Yeshiva.

Notable alumni of the yeshiva include Rabbi Jacob Pollak and Rabbi Naphtali Hirsch Treves.

=== The period of the Acharonim ===
The expellees of the Nuremberg community who moved to Fürth established the Fürth Community. The city's rabbis maintained a yeshiva in Fürth, but it was only in the generation of the author of "Mateh Yissachar" (the 17th century, the tenth Rosh Yeshiva of Fürth) that the yeshiva became institutionalized and large. The Yeshiva was renowned, and saw such students as Rabbi Shabbethai Horowitz, the Shelah, Maharashk, Rabbi Shmuel of Fürth, author of the "Beit Shmuel" on the Shulchan Aruch, Rabbi Yosef Steinhart (at that time the number of students in the Yeshiva ranged between 400 and 600), Rabbi Zvi Hirsch Yanov, and Rabbi Wolf Hamburg. An example of the importance of the Yeshiva in the Jewish world: after the death of Rabbi Baruch Kahana Rapaport, in order to compete in the elections for the head of the city, one had to meet several conditions, including that the rabbi be great in Torah and not only in pilpul, and that the rabbi have at least three years of experience as the head of a Yeshiva and the Av Beit Din of a large community. The candidates for the head of the Yeshiva were: Rabbi Yonatan Eybeschütz, Rabbi Shmuel Hillman, Rabbi Yitzchak Halevi Horowitz, Rabbi David Strauss, Rabbi Yaakov Yitzchak Segal Landau, and Rabbi Shalom Rokeach of Brody. In the elections that were held, Rabbi Yonatan Eybeschütz was elected and he was happy, but when the people of the Metz community heard that Rabbi Yonatan was preparing to leave them, they informed Rabbi Yonatan that according to the terms of the rabbinate he had received, he would not be able to leave Metz until 12 years had passed unless he paid a fine of 6,000 francs. They gave him two weeks to decide, at the end of which he decided to stay in Metz for at least two years. This concession caused him great sorrow, and in 1763 he still mentioned this concession with sadness. The importance of the rabbinate of Fürth caused the printers of his book Urim Ve'Tumim to mention that he was accepted as the rabbi of Fürth. A similar case occurred 50 years earlier with Rabbi Eliezer Laser Heilprin-Charif, who was accepted as the rabbi of Fürth but died, and the fact was mentioned on the title page of his book.

Thanks to the Yeshiva, the Fürth community became a major center of Torah, and there was even a Jewish printing house in the community, the second most important after the Amsterdam printing house.

In the final days of the yeshiva, after the passing of Rabbi Meshulam Zalman Cohen, author of "Bigdei Kehuna," the Reform movement could have complained to the authorities that the yeshiva was an institution without a normal leader and therefore should be closed, and the Yeshiva understood that if a serious head of the Yeshiva like the previous one was not found, it might be closed. The Yeshiva offered Rabbi Moshe Sofer, the author of the "Chatam Sofer", the position. At that time, the number of students in the Yeshiva ranged between 300 and 400 students, and Sofer coordinated his move to Fürth with Rabbi Wolf Hamburg, along with about 300 of his students from Pressburg, since in those days the Yeshiva students were hosted in the homes of the community members, and he took upon himself the rabbinate of Fürth. After Sofer organized to leave, a commotion arose in Pressburg. The city's Parnas complained that without him the Reformists would overcome them, and Sofer agreed to stay in Pressburg. Rabbi Elazar Loew, Rabbi Moshe Mintz, and Rabbi Avraham Tiktin were nominated to head the Yeshiva in his place. The community members asked Sofer whom he thought was the most suitable of the three, but he replied that the most suitable was Rabbi Aharon Joshua Herzfeld from the Rawitsch community. After he was chosen, the government disqualified him because he was too Haredi and not originally German, and Rabbi Wolf Hamburg stood in his place.

=== Closing of the yeshiva ===
Towards the end of Rabbi Meshulam Zalman Cohen's life, the authorities began to harass the yeshiva regarding its "uncultured" character and the lack of secular studies. In 1813, a law was issued (though not implemented) requiring all Jews to be tested on secular subjects. In 1824, the authorities issued an order to close the yeshiva, but the decree was rescinded after the intervention of Amschel Mayer Rothschild. Following denunciations and pressure on the authorities, a decree was issued in 1827 to change the character of the yeshiva, and from 1828, the yeshiva operated underground. In August 1830, during Rabbi Hamburg's general lecture, police officers broke into the study hall and forcibly removed the students.

Rabbi Wolf Hamburg lamented the situation in the introduction to his book Sha'ar Hazkenim.

Several years after the yeshiva's closure, a small group of Orthodox Jews re-established a Jewish school in the city, headed by Rabbi Selig Aviezri Auerbach. The school grew, and due to its high standards, the community's other two schools, which were run by Reform Jews, were closed. He was succeeded as head of the school by Dr. Dessau.

== Sources ==
- Binyamin Shlomo Hamburger, (A Hebrew book) הישיבה הרמה בפיורדא, Three volumes, published by Machon Moreshet Ashkenaz (Ashkenaz Heritage Institute), Bnei Brak, 2010.
