= Saul Wahl =

Legendary King of Poland for one day in 1587

Saul Wahl Katzenellenbogen
- Temporary King of Poland (rex pro tempore); Head of House Katzenellenbogen

King of Poland; Grand Duke of Lithuania
- Reign: 18 August 1587
- Coronation: 18 August 1587
- Predecessor: Stephen Báthory
- Successor: Sigismund III Vasa
- Born: 1541
- Died: 1617 (aged 75–76)
- Spouse: Deborah Rivkah Drucker
- Issue: Meir Wahl; 12 other children
- House: Katzenellenbogen
- Father: Samuel Judah Katzenellenbogen
- Religion: Judaism

Saul Wahl Katzenellenbogen (1541–1617) was a wealthy and politically influential Polish Jew who is in Jewish folk legends said to have briefly occupied the throne of Poland on 18 August 1587. He has historically borne the nickname, "Le roi d'un jour" (king for a day).

Saul's father was Samuel Judah Katzenellenbogen. Wahl married Deborah Rivkah Drucker, granddaughter of Israel ben Josef and niece of Moses Isserles, with whom he had thirteen children, including the renowned Polish rabbi Meir and Henele Wahl Katzenallenbogen, wife of Ephraim Zalman Shor.

== Folklore ==
Wahl's story has gained a firm place in the folklore of the Jewish people. The version of the story set forth in the Jewish Encyclopedia reads as follows:

At a point in his life, Lithuanian noble Nicholas Radziwill, wishing to do penance for the many atrocities he had committed while a young man, undertook a pilgrimage to Rome in order to consult the pope as to the best means for expiating his sins. The pope advised him to dismiss all his servants and to lead for a few years the life of a wandering beggar. After the expiration of the period prescribed, Radziwill found himself destitute and penniless in Padua, Italy. His appeals for help were heeded by nobody, and his story of being a prince was received with scorn and ridicule.

He finally decided to appeal to Samuel Judah Katzenellenbogen, the rabbi of Padua. Katzenellenbogen received him with marked respect, treated him very kindly, and provided him with the means to return to Lithuania. When the time for departure came the prince asked the rabbi how he could repay him for his kindness. To allow Radziwill to repay the favour, Samuel asked that he help find his son Saul, who years before had left to study in a yeshiva in Poland. Upon his return to Poland he inquired at all yeshivas until he found Saul in Brest-Litovsk. Radziwill was impressed with Saul's intellect and offered to board him in his own castle, where Saul could pursue his studies. Radziwill's court personnel were similarly impressed with Saul, and his reputation spread throughout Poland.

When King Stephen Báthory died in 1586, the Poles were divided between wishing to be ruled by the Zamoyski family and the Zborowski. Polish law at that time stated that the throne might not remain unoccupied for any length of time, and that in case electors could not agree upon a king, an outsider should be appointed rex pro tempore (temporary king). Radziwill proposed that Saul Wahl Katzenellenbogen be appointed temporary king, and Wahl was elected to the office. Traditions disagree as to the length of his reign. Some state that he ruled one night only; others make it a few days.

== Historicity ==
Historian Gustav Karpeles writes that "an historical kernel lies hidden in the legend" that, he says, "rests upon an historical substratum". Nicholas Radziwill, he says, made a widely publicized pilgrimage to Jerusalem. While returning, wrote Radziwill, he was attacked in Italy by robbers and was left in Ancona without any money. His pleas for help were ignored by all except a Jewish merchant, who alone believed his claim that he was a Polish noble. The merchant provided him with funds to return to Poland. Karpeles concludes that Radziwill's narrative is consistent with the narrative of the Jewish tale and that the lone Jewish merchant who had helped Radziwill was Samuel Judah Katzenellenbogen, Saul Wahl's father.

== Ancestry ==
Ancestors of Saul Wahl

Moshe
Yitzhak of Ellenbogen
Meir Katzenellenbogen
Yechiel Yehuda Luria
Julia-Malka Luria
Malka Lifshitz
Samuel Judah Katzenellenbogen
Judah Minz
Abraham Minz
HaLevi Kranch
Hannah Minz
Yitzchak Liwa of Ferrara
Livo Liwa
Saul Wahl Katzenellenbogen
Abigail Ogla Katzenellenbogen
