= Samuel Judah Katzenellenbogen =

Italian rabbi (1521–1597)

Rabbi Samuel Judah Katzenellenbogen

Personal life
- Born: 1521 Padua, Republic of Venice
- Died: 25 March 1597 (aged 75–76) Padua, Republic of Venice
- Children: Saul Wahl
- Parent: Meir Katzenellenbogen (father)
- Dynasty: Katzenellenbogen

Religious life
- Religion: Judaism

Jewish leader
- Dynasty: Katzenellenbogen

Samuel Judah Katzenellenbogen (Hebrew: שמואל יהודה קצנלנבוגן, romanized: Shmuel Yehuda Katzenellenbogen) (1521 – 25 March 1597), also known as MaHaShiks, was an Italian Rabbi, the son of Rabbi Meir Katzenellenbogen.

== Biography ==
He was distinguished even in his youth for his scholarship and his oratorical gifts. He was associated, both as rabbi and as writer, with his father, after whose death, in 1565, he was elected rabbi at Venice. He had many pupils, one of whom had a bust made of his beloved teacher, who was of imposing appearance, and set it up in the schoolhouse so as to have it constantly before his eyes (Eisenstadt-Wiener, Da'at Kedoshim, p. 82, St. Petersburg, 1897–98). Chaim Yosef David Azulai ("Shem ha-Gedolim," s.v.) speaks of this fact in connection with Samuel Judah Katzenellenbogen's great-grandfather, Judah Minz.

Katzenellenbogen was highly respected by his coreligionists throughout Italy, and, because of his wide scholarship, was honored by Joseph Karo, Solomon Luria, and Moses Isserles. Non-Jews also esteemed him highly: Paul Weidner, a converted Jew, dedicated his works to him. He is said to have accorded a hospitable reception to the Polish prince Mikołaj Krzysztof "the Orphan" Radziwiłł when the latter visited Padua. When the prince found himself in need of money he appealed to Katzenellenbogen, who lent him the necessary funds for continuing his journey, requesting in return that he deal leniently with the Jews in his country, and protect them against the accusation of ritual murder.

On Katzenellenbogen's death Leo Modena delivered the funeral oration, which has been printed in the Mivchar Yehudah (p. 63b). Samuel left one son, who is known under the name of Saul Wahl. Katzenellenbogen is the author of several responsa, which are included in the responsa collection of Moses Isserles (Nos. 23, 126, 127, 129) and in that of Samuel Kala'i; and of twelve derashot, published by his pupil (Venice, 1594; reprinted Lemberg, 1811, where the author's name is erroneously given as J. Minz). Katzenellenbogen also contributed some of the notes to the annotated edition of Maimonides' Yad ha-HazaKah (Venice, 1550), which notes Azulai (Shem ha-Gedolim, s.v.) ascribes to Meir of Padua.

== Jewish Encyclopedia bibliography ==
- Kerem Hemed, iii. 94 et seq.;
- Steinschneider, Cat. Bodl. No. 7047;
- Edelmann, Gedullat Sha'ul, pp. xiii. (where Katzenellenbogen's epitaph is quoted), 2b, 29 et seq., London, 1854;
- Julius Fürst, Bibl. Jud. ii. 179;
- Zunz, Monatstage des Kalenderjahres, p. 15;
- S. Kahan, 'Anaf 'Eẓ Abot, p. 31, Cracow, 1903;
- Eisenstadt-Wiener, Da'at Ḳedoshim, pp. 82 et seq.D. M. K.
