= Jacob Pollak =

Polish rabbi

Personal life
- Born: Yaakov ben Yosef; 1460 or 1470
- Died: 1541 Lublin, Poland

Religious life
- Religion: Judaism

Rabbi Jacob Pollak (other common spelling Yaakov Pollack), son of Rabbi Joseph, was the founder of the Polish method of halakhic and Talmudic study known as the Pilpul.

== Biography ==
He was born about 1460 or 1470 in Poland, and died at Lublin in 1541. He was a pupil of Jacob Margolioth of Nuremberg, with whose son Isaac he officiated in the rabbinate of Prague about 1490; but he first became known during the latter part of the activity of Judah Minz (d. 1508), who opposed him in 1492 regarding a question of divorce. Pollak's widowed mother-in-law, a wealthy and prominent woman, who was even received at the Bohemian court, had married off her second daughter, who was still a minor, to the Talmudist David Zehner. Regretting this step, she wished to have the marriage annulled; but the husband refused to permit a divorce, and the mother, on Pollak's advice, sought to have the union dissolved by means of the declaration of refusal (mi'un) on the part of the wife, permitted by Talmudic law. Menahem of Merseburg, a recognized authority, had decided half a century previously, however, that a formal letter of divorce was indispensable in such a case, although his opinion was not sustained by the Oriental rabbis. When, therefore, Pollak declared the marriage of his sister-in-law null and void, all the rabbis of Germany protested, and even excommunicated him until he should submit to Menahem's decision. Judah Minz of Padua also decided against Pollak, who was sustained by one rabbi only, Meïr Pfefferkorn, whom circumstances compelled to approve this course (Judah Minz, Responsa, No. 13; Grätz, Gesch. 2d ed., ix. 518).

Pollak had a further bitter controversy, with Minz's son Abraham, regarding a legal decision, in which dispute more than 100 rabbis are said to have taken part (Ibn Yaḥya, Shalshelet ha-Ḳabbalah, ed. Amsterdam, p. 51a).

== Legacy ==
After the accession of King Sigismund I in 1506, many Jews left Bohemia and went to Poland, founding a community of their own at Kraków. Pollak followed them, officiating as rabbi and organizing a school for the study of the Talmud, which, up to that time, had been neglected in Poland. This institution trained young men to introduce the study of the Talmud into other Polish communities. In 1530 Pollak went to the Holy Land, and on his return took up his residence at Lublin, where he died on the same day as his opponent, Abraham Minz. His most famous pupils were Rabbi Shalom Shachna of Lublin, Meïr of Padua (Maharam Padua) and the Maharal of Prague.

Pollak, in transferring the study of the Talmud from Germany, where it had been almost entirely neglected in the sixteenth century, to Poland, initiated a movement which in the course of time dominated the Talmudic schools of the latter country. The sophisticated treatment of the Talmud, which Pollak had found in its initial stage at Nuremberg, Augsburg, and Regensburg, was concerned chiefly with the mental gymnastics of tracing relationships between things widely divergent or even contradictory and of propounding questions and solving them in unexpected ways.

=== Works ===
Neither he nor Rabbi Shalom Shachna, one of his most famous students, authored any books. The latter's son Rabbi Israel Shachna said that neither his father nor his father's rebbe wished to bind future generations to their rulings, and cited other rabbis who likewise had refrained from committing their legal ruling to book form.

Pollak's contemporaries were unanimous in regarding him as one of the great men of his time, although the exaggerations to which his method eventually led were later criticized with severity (comp. Gans, "Ẓemaḥ Dawid," ed. Offenbach, p. 31a). Pollak himself, however, was not responsible for these, since he modestly refrained from publishing the decisions at which he arrived by his system, not wishing to be regarded as a casuist whose decisions were to be implicitly followed.

Only a few quotations from him are found in the works of other authors.
