= Abraham Minz =

Italian rabbi (c. 1440–1520)

Rabbi Abraham ha-Levi Minz

Personal life
- Born: c. 1440 Padua, Republic of Venice
- Died: 20 May 1520 Padua, Republic of Venice
- Spouse: Livo Liwa
- Children: Hannah; Moshe; Yosef; Judah
- Parents: Judah Minz (father); HaLevi Kranach (mother)

Religious life
- Religion: Judaism

Abraham ben Judah ha-Levi Minz was an Italian rabbi who flourished at Padua in the first half of the 16th century. Minz studied chiefly under his father, Judah Minz, whom he succeeded as rabbi and head of the yeshiva of Padua. According to Gedaliah ibn Yahya ben Joseph (Shalshelet ha-Kabbalah, p. 51a, Amsterdam, 1697), it was with Abraham Minz that Jacob Pollak had the quarrel which ended in their excommunicating each other; according to most other authorities, the quarrel was with Judah Minz. Ibn Yahya further says that the Italian rabbis believe that Polak and Abraham Minz died on the same day (according to David Gans in 1530; according to Halberstam in 1541). Minz was the author of a number of decisions that were printed with those of R. Lewa of Ferrara (Venice, 1511). He was the author also of Seder Gittin ve-Chalitzah, a treatise on divorce and Chalitzah, printed with the responsa of his father and of his son-in-law Meir Katzenellenbogen.

== Jewish Encyclopedia bibliography ==
- Graziadio Nepi-Mordecai Ghirondi, in Kerem Ḥemed, iii.91;
- Michael, Heimann Joseph, (1891) Or ha-Ḥayyim, Frankfort-on-the-Main (in Hebrew), No. 114;
- Marco Mortara, in Mosé, v.307;
- idem, Indice, p. 39;
- Steinschneider, Cat. Bodl. col. 632.
