= Naphtali Hirsch Treves =

Naphtali Hirsch ben Eliezer Treves (or Naphtali Hirz, Hirtz Shatz) was a kabalist and Rabbinic scholar of the 16th century who officiated as Hazzan and rabbinic judge in Frankfort-on-the-Main. He was the author of Mala Ha'aretz Deah (1560), a famous cabalistic commentary on the Siddur (prayer-book), printed at Thüngen by his son Rav Eliezer Treves, Chief Rabbi of Frankfurt, and also of Naftule Elokim (Heddernheim, 1546), an index to Bahya ben Asher's commentary on the Pentateuch. The preface to the Naftule Elokim consists partly of the result of private studies and partly of quotations from other cabalistic works. Treves also wrote, a supercommentary on Rashi, which is still extant. Naphtali Hirz engaged in disputations with Christian scholars, and he made comments on the pronunciation of German language. He is especially important for his accounts of Jewish customs and ceremonies.

Rabbi Hirtz's father was a descendant of Rashi of Troyes (possible explanation for the name Treves). His commentary on siddur is said to have been used by the Arizal. It relies heavily on kabbalah and the teachings of Rabbi Elazar author of the Rokeach (medieval Rabbinic scholar who lived at worms). It closely follows the medieval school of hasidei ashkenaz.

Hirtz's son, Eliezer, eventually became the Chief Rabbi of Frankfurt.

== Jewish Encyclopedia bibliography ==
- Moritz Steinschneider, Cat. Bodl. cols. 2028–2030;
- Graziadio Nepi-Mordecai Ghirondi, Toledot Gedole Yisrael, p. 94;
- David Conforte, Ḳore ha-Dorot, p. 27a;
- Jost's Annalen, ii. 162;
- Zunz, Z. G. p. 190;
- D. Gans, Ẓemaḥ Dawid, p. 406, Frankfort-on-the-Main, 1692;
- Azulai, Shem ha-Gedolim, ii. 92a;
- Zunz, in Steinschneider, Hebr. Bibl. x. 134;
- Brüll's Jahrb. i. 101–104.
