= Shaare Zedek Medical Center =

Shaare Zedek Medical Center מרכז רפואי שערי צדק

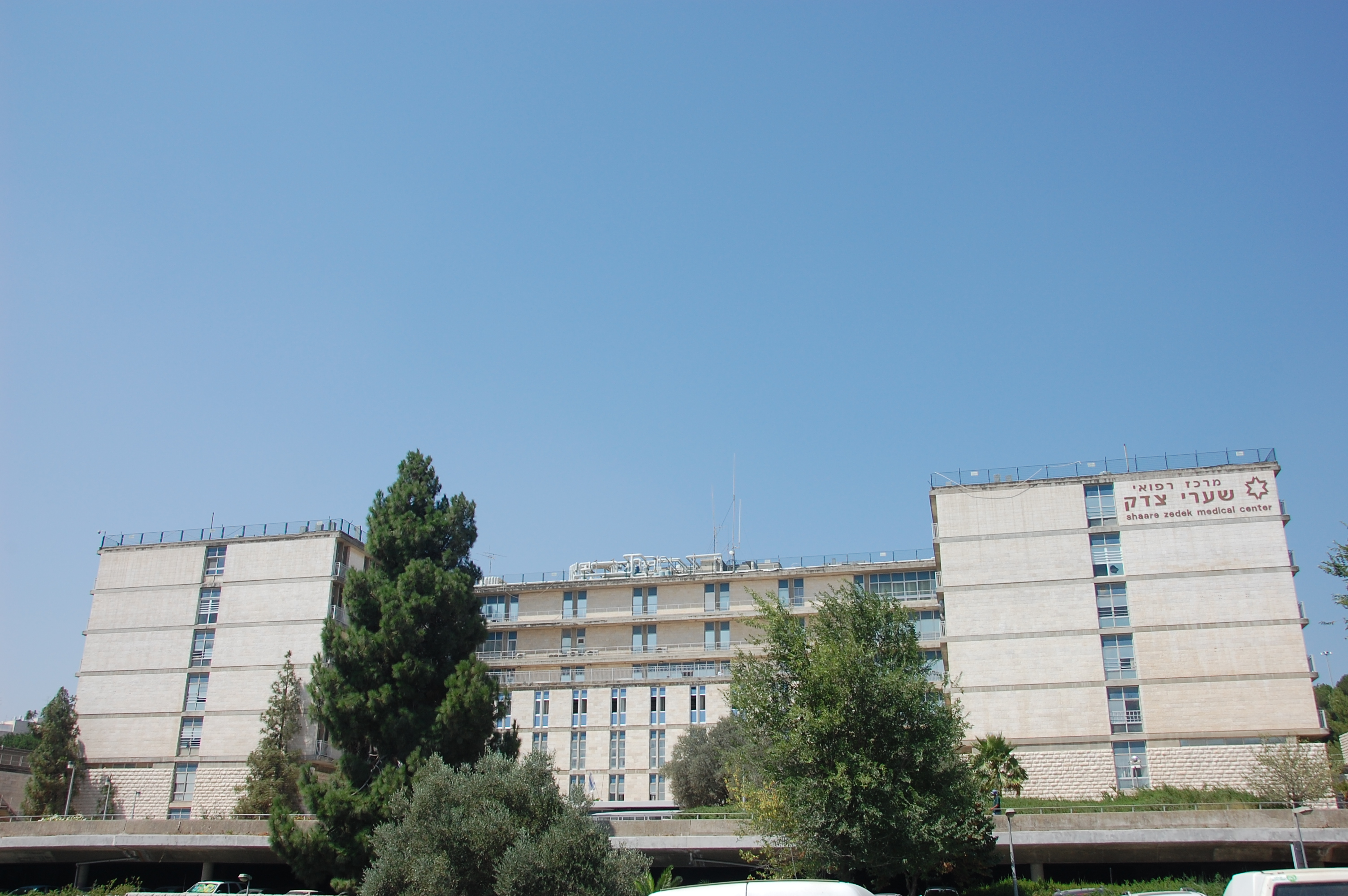
- Shaare Zedek Medical Center

Geography
- Location: Jerusalem, Israel
- Coordinates: 31°46′23″N 35°11′06″E

Organisation
- Care system: Non-profit
- Type: District General, Teaching
- Affiliated university: Hebrew University of Jerusalem

Services
- Emergency department: yes
- Beds: 1,000

Helipads
- Helipad: yes

History
- Founded: 1902

Links
- Website: szmc.org.il

The Shaare Zedek Medical Center (Hebrew: מרכז רפואי שערי צדק, romanized: Merkaz Refu'i Sha'arei Tzedek) is a large teaching hospital in Jerusalem. It was established in 1902 and is affiliated with Hebrew University of Jerusalem.

== History ==
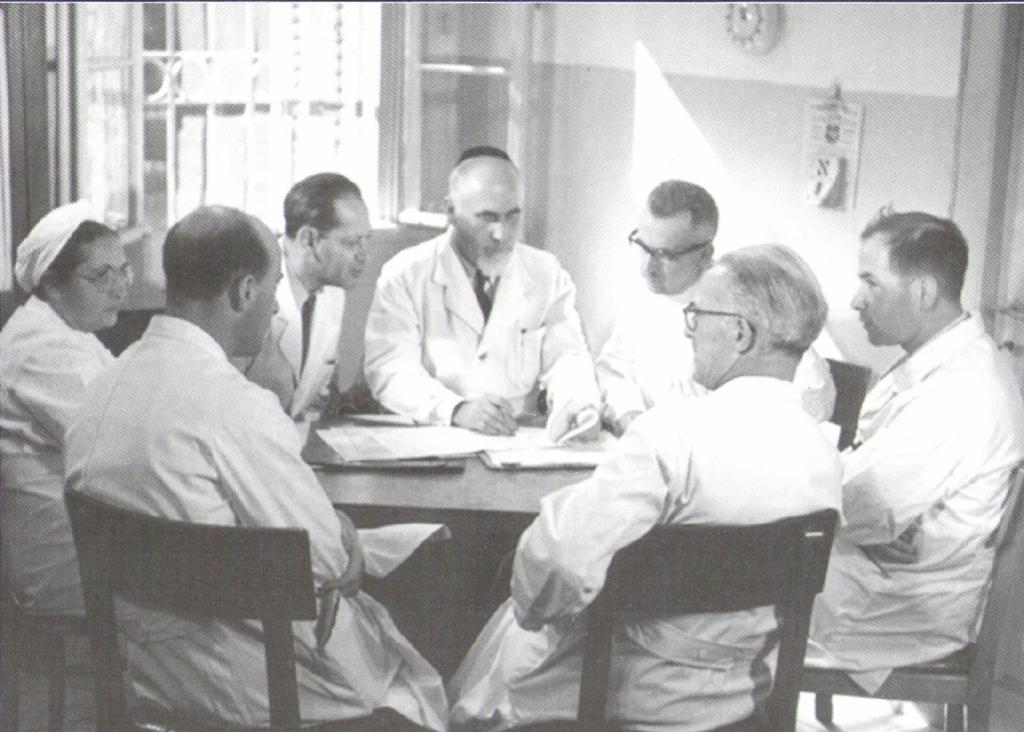
Shaare Zedek in the 1950s

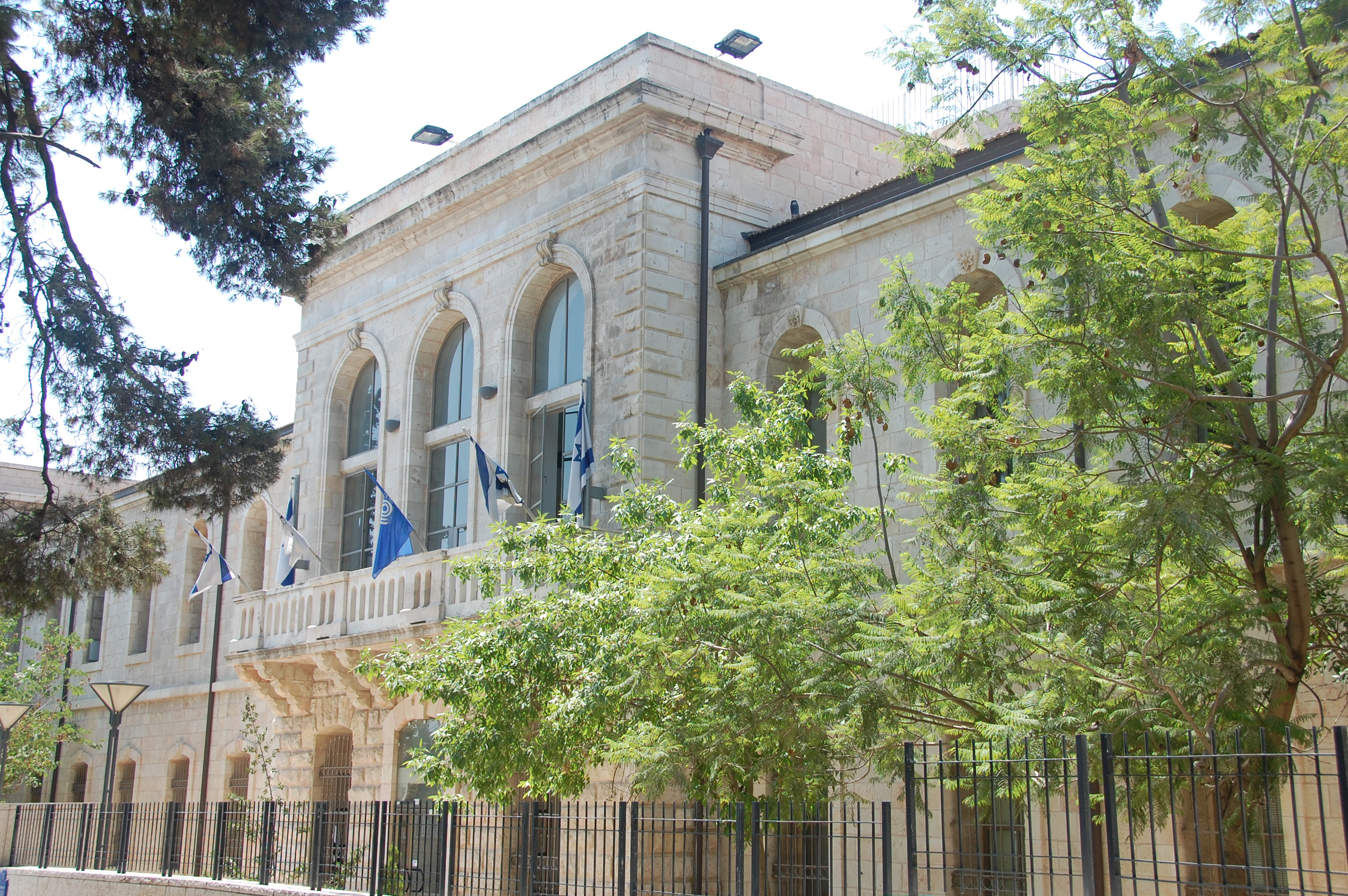
Original Shaare Zedek hospital building on Jaffa Road, now headquarters of the Israel Broadcasting Authority.

Shaare Zedek was the first large district general hospital to be located in the western portion of Jerusalem and is today the city's fastest growing hospital and the only major medical facility in the city's center. In the Old Yishuv of Jerusalem, there were not many hospitals, and due to conflicts between the various groups, the German Jews were left without a hospital. Because of this situation, the German and Dutch expatriate community in Jerusalem decided to establish their own hospital under the patronage of the German Empire. As part of this effort, the "Committee for the Establishment of a Jewish Hospital in Jerusalem" was founded, presided over by Rabbi Seligman Baer Bamberger, and subsequently by Rabbi Marcus Lehmann. In November 1884, the committee sent Abraham Grünbaum, along with Abraham Rose on behalf of the "Pekidim and Amarcalim" Organization, to explore the possibility of purchasing a building for the hospital. According to some sources, the land on which the old Shaare Zedek Hospital stood was acquired as part of this endeavor. The initiative gained momentum with the arrival in the country of a young Haredi doctor named Dr. Moshe Wallach, who came as an emissary of the Jewish Committee from Frankfurt. After gaining experience in medical work in the Old City and opening a private clinic, Dr. Wallach joined the initiative to establish the hospital and went to Germany to raise funds and obtain German imperial patronage. Following the success of Dr. Wallach's fundraising mission, the hospital was built. After the Ottoman Turks gave permission in the 1890s, and with funding from European donors, the hospital was built on Jaffa Road, 2 miles (3.2 km) outside the Old City. The design was by German architect Theodor Sandel [German]. Its opening ceremony took place on January 27, 1902. Dr. Moshe Wallach was the director from then until 1947. Schwester Selma lived in the hospital and cared for abandoned children. The building in Bayit Vegan was inaugurated in 1980.

In December 2012, Shaare Zedek assumed operational control over Bikur Cholim Hospital and merged many of its activities. The hospital treats more than 600,000 patients per year in more than 30 inpatient departments and over 70 outpatient units and maintains a very active academic service as a leading research and teaching institution. Shaare Zedek is classified as a public/private hospital, serving as a non-profit institution and dependent on donor support for capital development, while offering medical care for the wider Jerusalem-area community.

In May 2026, following years of smaller donations, WhatsApp founder Jan Koum announced a further $200 million donation from his foundation — the largest such contribution ever to any Israeli healthcare institution — which will be used towards the construction of a 140,000-square-metre (1,500,000 sq ft), 24-story tower that will add 800 beds and other facilities to the hospital including a rooftop helipad.

== Facilities ==
Shaare Zedek Medical Center is located across two major campuses. The main campus is located on an 11.5-acre (4.7 ha) site between the neighborhoods of Bayit VeGan in the south and Ramat Beit HaKerem in the north, east of Mount Herzl in southwest Jerusalem. The downtown campus, formerly known as Bikur Cholim Hospital, is located in the heart of Jerusalem's downtown commercial zone.

The hospital has 1,000 beds and treats over 500,000 patients a year in its in-patient and out-patient facilities.

As terrorist attacks in Jerusalem reached a peak in 2001–04, Shaare Zedek treated more victims than any other hospital in Israel. The hospital's trauma unit located within its Weinstock Department of Emergency Medicine on the Fanya Gottesfeld Heller Floor became a model for emergency medicine and handling large-scale mass casualty incidents. The main hospital campus, completed in 1979, consists of ten interconnected buildings with the central structure being a ten-story building, which houses the in-patient departments. The bottom three floors are located underground so as to allow the hospital to continue to operate even under the threat of missile strikes. The Department of Emergency Medicine, the Wohl Surgical Operating Complex inaugurated in 2010, the pharmacy and critical supply areas are all located in this underground portion and other areas of the hospital can be evacuated to this portion when necessary. Shaare Zedek is the on-call facility in the event of chemical warfare attacks in the Jerusalem area. Shaare Zedek's decontamination facilities served as an inspiration for New York's largest similar facility at the New York Downtown Hospital.

== Administration ==
Shaare Zedek is a private hospital that relies on fundraising for capital development projects. The director general of the hospital is Prof. Ofer Merin. Professor Jonathan Halevy who served as the Director General of the hospital from 1988 until 2019 was appointed as the Medical Center's president.

The hospital maintains public relations offices in ten countries, among them are England and the United States. A high percentage of the hospital's physicians and other staff are immigrants, especially from English-speaking countries.

== Departments ==
=== Wohl Surgical Operating Complex ===
In June 2007, Shaare Zedek renovated its surgical facilities. The Wohl Surgical Operating Complex opened in the fall of 2010.

=== The Next Generation Building ===
In 2015, Shaare Zedek opened the first phase of The Next Generation Building, a comprehensive response to medical care for children from infancy through adolescence. The ten-story building houses the Wilf Children's Hospital and the Glaubach Department of Pediatric Emergency Medicine. It also includes a pediatric intensive care unit (PICU), as well as departments for pediatric neurology, cardiology, urology, nephrology, rheumatology, pulmonology, hematology, gastroenterology, infectious disease, and neonatology. The hospital's maternity facilities were also expanded.

=== Wilf Women and Infant Center ===
A third maternity department was opened in March 2009. After the merger with Bikur Cholim Hospital in December 2012, the number of births grew to 22,000 a year in 2023, the most of any hospital in Israel. In January 2024, there were 1,926 babies born at the hospital, the most of any month in Shaare Zedek history.

=== Jesselson Heart Center ===
The tenth floor of the hospital is occupied by the Jesselson Heart Center, which combines cardiology and cardiothoracic surgery. In 2008, it was the first hospital in Israel to replace heart valves via cardiac catheterization.

=== Weinstock Family Department of Emergency Medicine ===
Shaare Zedek's emergency department includes a 14-bed observation and short stay unit, as well as a 5-bed chest pain unit. The department, opened in the early 2000s, served 112,000 patients in 2012.

=== Orthopedics Department ===
The department includes separate units for the spine, arthroscopy, hand surgery, joint reconstruction, and foot and ankle care. A total of 14 orthopedic surgeons form the core of the unit, which receives patients from around the country.

=== Integrated oncology and palliative medicine department ===
Shaare Zedek was the first hospital in Israel to develop fully integrated oncology and palliative medicine services in 1994. The model of care developed at Shaare Zedek formed the basis for the 13 criteria for designation of a cancer center as a center of integrated oncology and palliative care that was developed by the European Society of Medical Oncology (ESMO).

=== Special units ===
The hospital has specialized units for Gaucher's disease and cystic fibrosis. In addition, neurosurgery department headed by Dr. Nevo Margalit opened in 2017, offering skull base surgery, neurooncoloy, pediatric neurosurgery, orthopedic surgery and trauma services.

== Notable faculty ==
- Naomi Amir (1931–1995), American-Israeli pediatric neurologist
- David Applebaum (1952–2003), American-born physician and rabbi, chief of emergency room and trauma services of Shaare Zedek, murdered in a Palestinian suicide bombing.
- Rachel Chalkowski (born 1939), midwife and a gemach organizer
- David L. Reich, American academic anesthesiologist, President & chief operating officer of the Mount Sinai Hospital, and President of Mount Sinai Queens
- Avraham Steinberg (born 1947), Director of Medical Ethics Unit at Shaare Zedek
- Moshe Wallach (1866–1957), German Jewish physician, founder of Shaare Zedek
- Jonathan Halevy (born 1947), Director General of Shaare Zedek between 1988 and 2019.

== Notable births ==
- Yitzhak Rabin (1922–1995), fifth Prime Minister of Israel

== See also ==
- List of hospitals in Israel
- Shaare Zedek Cemetery, Jerusalem
- Health care in Israel
