= Abraham of Bohemia =

Bohemian Jewish banker, tax collector, money lender and Court Jew

Abraham ben Moses Jaffe of Bohemia (Hebrew: אברהם בן משה יפה מבוהמיה; d. 1533) also known by his Latin name Abraham Judaeus Bohemus was a very prominent 16th-century Bohemian Jewish banker, tax collector, money lender and Court Jew who later moved to Poland and served as the Prefect of the Council of Four Lands from 1514 to 1518.

== Biography ==
Born in the mid-15th-century in Prague, Bohemia. His father Moses Jaffe of Bologna was a Polish rabbi and paternal descendant of Elhanan Jaffe of Dampierre. His mother Margolioth bat Samuel HaLevi was considered to be an extremely learned woman, to the point that some of her descendants adopted the second surname Margolioth, such as Abraham's brother Jacob Margolioth-Jaffe of Nuremberg. Early in his career, Abraham amassed a great fortune, which he later lent out to King Vladislaus II of Bohemia and Holy Roman Emperor Maximilian I. Around 1495, he emigrated to Kazimierz, Krakow, Poland, where he soon became a banker to Alexander Jagiellon and later King Sigismund I of Poland, with whom he later developed a close relationship.

In 1512 King Sigismund issued a decree notifying his subjects that he had appointed Abraham, prefect over them, and that one of Abraham's duties was to collect the Jewish poll tax from communities in Great Poland and Mazovia and to deliver the same into the king's treasury. From 1514, he also collected the Jewish poll tax in Lesser Poland, performing this function until 1518. It was also around this time that Abraham became involved in commerce, holding a trading post in Lwów, where he owned a house in the Jewish quarter, given to him by the king. Abraham's duties caused him to come into conflict with the Kraków provincial voivod and the Jewish communities of that city which caused him to suffer financially due to a ban that was placed on him by the Jewish community. This was mostly in respect to an order by Sigismund which mandated the Jews of Krakow to pay Abraham 200 florins, "for defending them against accusations brought up against them."

The Polish Jews were not pleased with their new Bohemian prefect, who had become very powerful. The king ordered all the Jews of Poland, and especially the rabbis, to respect the liberties and privileges granted to Abraham, and not to encroach upon them by excommunication or in any other such way. For these privileges Abraham paid an annual personal tax of 20 ducats. In 1518, after the intercession of Emperor Maximilian, Sigismund removed Abraham from the jurisdiction of the Council of Four Lands under threat of fines. The king also dismissed all accusations against Abraham, freed him from taxes paid by all other Jews, and allowed him freedom of commerce and banking in all Poland. In 1533, Sigismund removed Abraham from the jurisdiction of the royal officials and placed him under the jurisdiction of Queen Sforza. Nearing the end of his life he moved to Lwów, where he died around 1535.
