= Abraham Prochownik =

Abraham Prochownik was a Jew said, in some legendary sources, to have been nominated prince of Poland, in 842 CE. After the death of Prince Popiel, the Poles allegedly held a council at Kruszwica, to elect a successor. According to the legend, after much disagreement, they finally decided that the person who first entered the city on the following morning should be their ruler. For this they chose Abraham, a Jew and Powder-maker (prochownik), who was escorted to the council-hall and proclaimed prince of Poland. Abraham declined the honour and insisted upon their electing the wise Pole Piast, who became the founder of the Piast dynasty (compare the similar legend concerning Saul Wahl). A choice of king by lot or chance encounter is found in many folk-tales.

D.M. Dunlop and other scholars explored the possibility that Abraham was a historical person, either an exiled Khazar prince or a Khazar nobleman appointed over the western Slavs to collect tribute.

== Notes ==
1. Krauscher i.42; Sternberg 4.
