= Abraham Grünbaum (activist) =

Haredi activist

- אברהם גרינבאום
- Born: February 15, 1855; Weißenfels, North German Confederation
- Died: March 16, 1921 (aged 66); Jerusalem, British Empire
- Occupation: Activist
- Years active: 1884–1921
- Organization: Agudat Yisrael
- Spouse: Leah Goldschmidt
- Children: 10

Avraham Grünbaum (Hebrew: אברהם גרינבאום, February 15, 1855 – March 16, 1921) was a Haredi Jewish activist in the Agudat Yisrael organization and a leader of the Israelite community in Nuremberg. He is known, among other things, for his diary documenting his journey to the Land of Israel in 1885 to purchase a building for the Shaare Zedek Hospital.

== Biography ==
Born on February 15, 1855, to Kalonymus and Leah Grünbaum in the city of Weißenfels, Germany. In his childhood, he moved to Schwabach, where he became a student and close friend of Hille Wechsler. At the age of 13, he moved to Würzburg, where he studied at the "Max" school and was close to Rabbi Seligman Baer Bamberger, from whom he was influenced in his Orthodox views. While in Würzburg, he often visited the nearby Zell am Main, whose yeshiva he wished to attend. There, he met his future wife, Leah Goldschmidt, the great-granddaughter of Rabbi Mendel Rosenbaum. His plan to study at the Zell Yeshiva was abandoned due to his mother's illness, which confined him to Weißenfels. His economic life began during his studies with Hille Wechsler, who brought him into the family business, lent him money, and arranged jobs for him, which helped him study comfortably. In his adulthood, he was one of the major metal traders in Bavaria in the last third of the 19th century, became a metal expert, (Note: Apparently, this was due to his studies at the Zell Yeshiva, where the students would work part of the day in nail production.) and established a factory for precious metal plating. (Note: His factory was involved in the production of "gold leaf," hammered gold intended to decorate title pages of important books or bindings.) The historian Mordechai Breuer notes that he was known as one of the powerful Orthodox figures in Germany due to his business, which aided the struggles of the Orthodox in Nuremberg in particular and in Bavaria in general. At the age of 21, he married Leah Goldschmidt, with whom he had 10 children, and in 1892, he moved from Schwabach to Nuremberg. Within a short time, he became involved in Jewish communal affairs in Germany, was elected as a leader ("parnas") of the community, and was a trustee of the Pekidim and Amarkalim organization in their fundraising efforts in southern Germany. He was a member of the "Committee for the Establishment of a Jewish Hospital in Jerusalem," which was headed by Rabbi Seligman Baer Bamberger and later by Rabbi Meir Lehmann. In 1884, he was sent by the committee, together with Avraham Rose, to purchase the building of the German Consulate in the Muslim Quarter that was for sale. During the trip, they were unable to obtain permission to establish a hospital in the consulate building, but before leaving, Grünbaum managed to purchase the plot of land on which the old Shaare Zedek stood, (Note: This is according to a shortened diary he wrote, which was translated by Aharon Kellerman. It appears on Avraham Grünbaum's tombstone inscription.) today on Jaffa Road. Grünbaum handed over the land along with a sum of money to Dr. Moshe Wallach, who indeed established the hospital after conducting a fundraising campaign in Germany. His diary, written during the trip, is a rare documentation of the Jews of Jerusalem and Hebron and their customs, written with the feeling of a lover of the Land of Israel and the Jewish people. It was translated into Hebrew by Mordechai Eliav and published in the journal "Sinai".

In Germany, his reputation grew as one of the prominent Jewish activists. After moving to Nuremberg, he became one of the leaders of the separate community there (Adat Yisrael), and when Agudat Yisrael was founded in 1912, he was one of its leaders and was even sent to Galicia to persuade Hasidic Rebbes and gain their support. He was among the central activists for the amendment of the Jewish constitution in Bavaria and was elected to the "German-Dutch Directorate for Eretz Israel Affairs," the later iteration of the Pekidim and Amarkalim organization. He worked extensively for Jewish education in Germany and for the promotion of Agudat Yisrael, but he was not among the extremists and tended towards cooperation with Zionism. After World War I, thousands of Jewish orphans and refugees remained in Eastern Europe, and Agudat Yisrael made great efforts to help them. As part of this, Grünbaum traveled to Eastern Europe many times. At the end of 1918, he received the title "Moreinu" (our rabbi) from Rabbi Abraham Yitzhak Klein.

In 1921, he was sent by Agudat Yisrael on a mission to the Land of Israel but suffered a Myocardial infarction on the way in Qantara. He died a few days later in the Shaare Zedek Hospital, which he had worked to establish. His funeral was attended by all the Jews of Jerusalem, and eulogies were delivered by Rabbi Sonnenfeld, Rabbi Ze'ev Pappenheim, Rabbi Dr. Yehuda Bergman of Nuremberg, Moshe Blau, Rabbi Yechiel Michel Tucazinsky, Rabbi Ben Zion Yadler, Rabbi Yisrael Porat, Rabbi Shlomo Aharon Wertheimer, and Rabbi Nissim Yehuda Danon. His tombstone reads: "Here lies the distinguished Rabbi, precious and wise man, who pursued righteousness and kindness all his days and did much good for others. His home was open wide, and the poor were members of his household. A general and public activist for the children of the Diaspora and the children of the Land of Israel, a leader and guide of the Israelite community in the city of Nuremberg in Ashkenaz, Mr. Avraham son of Kalonymus Grünbaum, passed away on Wednesday, the 6th of Adar II, 5681 [March 16, 1921] here in Jerusalem, may it be rebuilt and established, and was brought to burial on this day. May his soul be bound up in the bond of eternal life." The tombstone remained in its place and was not moved at all during the Jordanian rule. After his burial, his wife returned to Nuremberg and died there. In 1973, his autobiography was published by Professor Aharon Kellerman, and in 1998, a booklet "The Descendants of Avraham Grünbaum" was published by his grandson bearing his name.

== Sources ==
- "The Descendants of Avraham Grünbaum" (in Hebrew), September 1998, Jerusalem, edited by Avraham Grünbaum the grandson.
- Mordechai Eliav: A Journey to Jerusalem in the Year 5645 [1885] (Chapters from the Diary of a Messenger on a Mission)(in Hebrew); Sinai Journal, Volume 67 (Parts 2-3), Iyar-Sivan 5730 [May-June 1970], pp. 140-166.
