= Jonathan Halevy =

Israeli public healthcare expert

- יונתן הלוי
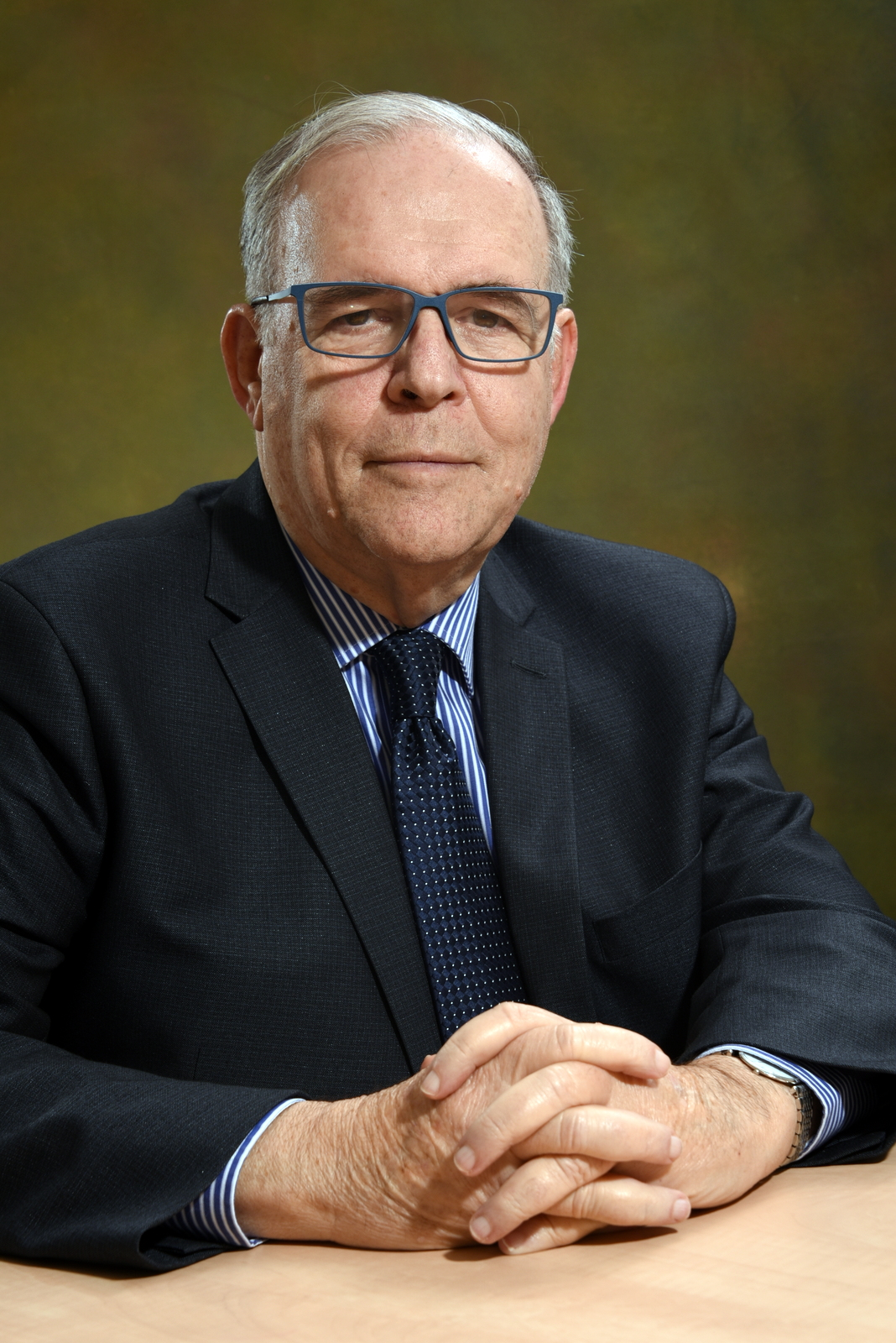
- Born: 22 June 1948 (age 78); Tel Aviv, Israel
- Education: Tel Aviv University
- Known for: Director General and President of Shaare Zedek Medical Center
- Notable work: Establishment of integrated cardiac health center, Department of Emergency Medicine
- Awards: Yakir Yerushalayim Award, Honorary Doctorates from Yeshiva University and Touro University
- Scientific career
- Fields: Public healthcare, Internal medicine, Gastroenterology
- Workplaces: Shaare Zedek Medical Center, Yale University

Jonathan Halevy (Hebrew: יונתן הלוי; born in Tel-Aviv, 22 June 1948) is an Israeli public healthcare expert and physician. He served as the Director General of Jerusalem's Shaare Zedek Medical Center from 1988 until 2019 and currently serves as the hospital's president.

== Biography ==
Jonathan Halevy was born in 1948 in Tel Aviv and is the oldest of four siblings. His father managed a steel materials factory in Kiryat Gat. He attended Zeitlin High School in Tel Aviv.

At age 18, Halevy was accepted into the Atuda program as a medical student. For this program he took part in the first class of the Tel Aviv University's medical school. In 1973 he graduated medical school and started his residency at Rabin Medical Center, in Petah Tikva. He served as a Medical Officer in the Israeli Military between 1973 and 1977, assuming the rank of Deputy Medical Commander of the Central Command. Between 1983 and 1985, he was a research and clinical fellow at Yale University where he was dedicated to research of diseases of the liver and intestinal tract.

In May 2021 he received the Yakir Yerushalayim Award (Worthy Citizen of Jerusalem), presented by the City of Jerusalem and regarded as the city's most prestigious civilian award.

In 1988, he was appointed as Director-General of Shaare Zedek Medical Center, Jerusalem, a role he held until 2019 when he assumed the position of President of the medical center.

During his tenure as Director General, the hospital increased in inpatient activity from 16,000 patients per year to 100,000.

In 1994, he oversaw the creation of an integrated cardiac health center within the hospital. The Department of Emergency Medicine he opened in 2004 now sees over 155,000 cases per year. The department is regularly called upon to treat victims of terror attacks and he has been involved in consulting with other hospitals around the world on mass casualty response.

In 2017, the hospital was the first in Jerusalem to be granted accreditation by the JCI- Joint Commission International for quality of care and patient safety.

Between 2013–2015 and 2017 Halevy served as Chairman of the National Committee updating the National Basket of Health Services.

Following the earthquake which devastated Kathmandu, Nepal in April 2015, Halevy participated in the IDF medical mission to the region.

In 2008, he was awarded an Honorary Doctorate from Yeshiva University and in 2019, he was awarded an Honorary Doctorate from Touro University

Over the course of the Corona outbreak, Halevy has served as a regular commentator on local and international media. In that capacity he serves as a member of the Israel Ministry of Health's public information team.

In October 2021 he was again appointed to serve as the Chair of the National Committee overseeing the National Basket of Health Services.

Halevy lectures extensively both in Israel and internationally and has published numerous articles and papers in the field of medicine and two books in Hebrew relating to positive bedside manner and complementary medicine.

== Public positions ==
• The Israel Medical Association

• The Israel Association of Internal Medicine

• The Israel Association of Gastroenterology

• The Israel Association for the Study of Liver Diseases

• The Israel Association for Quality in Medicine

• The Israel Health Policy Forum

• The American Society for Healthcare Risk Management

• Board of Directors, Bar-Ilan University

• Member of the Health Council, Ministry of Health
