= Moses Jaffe of Bologna =

Moses ben Eliezer Jaffe of Bologna (Hebrew: רבי משה בן אליעזר יפה מבולוניה; died 1480) was a prominent Polish-Italian rabbi.

He was born in Lesser Poland around 1400 to Eliezer ben Meir Jaffe, a German-born rabbi and scholar. In his early years he married Margolioth bat Samuel HaLevi. In the mid-15th century he moved to Bologna, Italy, where he was the head of the rabbinical court and is mentioned in the "Shalshelet ha-Ḳabbalah" manuscript at St. Petersburg. Jaffe died in Bologna around 1480. His son is Abraham of Bohemia.
