= David Tevel Katzenellenbogen =

Talmudic scholar and rabbi

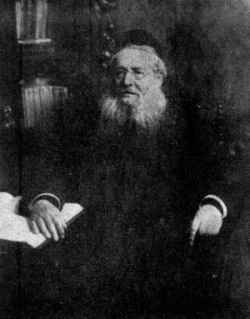
David Tevel Katzenellenbogen

David Tevel Katzenellenbogen (1848-1931) was a Russian rabbi and Talmudic scholar who served as chief rabbi of Saint Petersburg and played an active role in Jewish communal and early Zionist affairs.

== Early life and family ==
Katzenellenbogen was born in Taurage, Kovno Governorate, Russian Empire (now Lithuania), into a long-established rabbinic family whose roots trace to Katzenelnbogen, a small medieval state of the Holy Roman Empire. The family is first recorded with Meyer ben Isaac Katzenellenbogen (b. 1473). David Tevel Katzenellenbogen's father was a rabbi as were two brothers; his maternal grandfather was Rabbi Yehudah Abelsan, author of Zikhron Yehudah. His ancestors included the Maharal of Prague. In his youth he was recognized for knowledge of Torah and at age 16 he edited a Talmudic commentary.

== Career ==
He served as rabbi in Virbalis, now in Lithuania, beginning in 1876. In 1894 he became the rabbi in Suwalki, Suwalki guberniya. In 1907 he was invited to Saint Petersburg, where he later became the chief rabbi.

In his youth he was advised to study Russian. This became very valuable for him, as he was respected by Czarist officials and frequently acted as an intermediary between the Russian government and Yiddish speaking Jews on matters of importance. He was instrumental in overturning a ban on Kosher slaughter in Finland after the sejm outlawed it in 1908. During World War 1, he was in charge of getting kosher food to Russian Jewish soldiers, and initiated an American fund for Jewish refugees.

Katzenellenbogen went to St. Petersburg as a "community spiritual rabbi." After Rabbi Eisenstadt left for Paris in 1923, he became the chief rabbi and the only Jewish religious leader in the city. He retired because of age in the late 1920s. This was a difficult period and by the late 1920s the Bolsheviks had closed all public Jewish institutions. He tried to do his best for the Jewish community until his 1931 death. He was not replaced until 1934.

He was a member of the directorate of Hoveve Tsiyon, a forerunner of modern Zionism. A contributor to Talmudic scholarship at a time when Hebrew books in Russia were rare, he wrote two books, Divre David (1928) and Ma'yam Mei Neftorah (1923); the latter was published by the official Russian press.

== See also ==
Katzenellenbogen family
