= Abraham ben Gedaliah Tiktin =

18th-century German rabbi

Oberlandrabbiner Abraham Tiktin
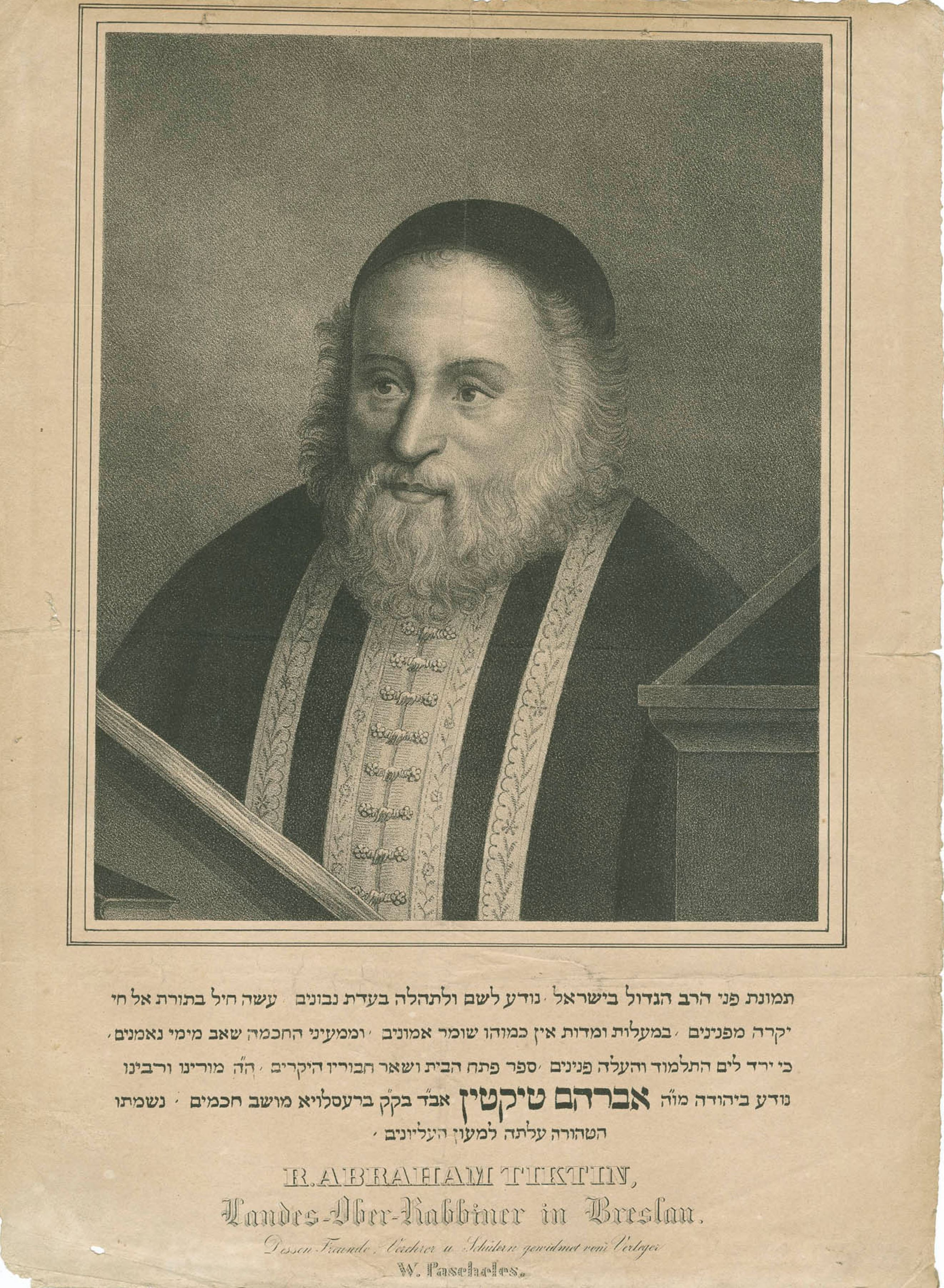
- Title: Rabbi

Personal life
- Born: 24 December 1764/30 Kislev 5525 Swarzędz
- Died: 27 December 1820/22 Tevet 5581 Wrocław
- Spouse: Esther
- Children: Shlomo Zalman Tiktin, Isaac Tiktin, Moses Tiktin
- Parent: Gedaliah Tiktin (father)
- Occupation: Chief Rabbi of Breslau

Religious life
- Religion: Judaism
- Denomination: Orthodox

Jewish leader
- Yahrtzeit: 22 Tevet

Rabbi Abraham Tiktin (24 December 1764/30 Kislev 5525 - 27 December 1820/22 Tevet 5581) was a German Ashkenazi Rabbi who served as the Chief Rabbi of Breslau (Wrocław). He was a contemporary and colleague of Rabbi Akiva Eiger and Yaakov Lorberbaum (Jacob of Lisa).

== Biography ==
Abraham Tiktin was the son of Rabbi Gedaliah Tiktin, who served as rabbi of Poznań and later of the nearby town of Swarzędz, and Freidel. He was orphaned at the age of nine (in 1774/5534) and after that time, he was adopted by and learned with his brother-in-law Rabbi Yitzchak Mordechai of Greiditz. He later moved to Leszno, where he met and studied under Rabbi Akiva Eiger, Rabbi Yaakov Loberbaum and Rabbi Haim Auerbach.

He married Esther, daughter of Aaron Kutner and Friedel.

He served as rabbi of his father's community in Swarzędz, and afterwards also of Łęczyca and Głogów for 13 years. In 1816 he was appointed regional chief rabbi (Oberlandrabbiner) of Breslau by King Frederick William III of Prussia and remained in that position until his death in 1820.

At his funeral, Rabbi Yaakov Lorberbaum, Rabbi Salomon Plessner and Rabbi Moses Kronik all delivered eulogies.

He had three sons. His eldest son, Shlomo Zalman Tiktin succeeded him as rabbi of Breslau. Another was named Isaac Tiktin. His third son, Moses Tiktin, published his father's book, "Petach Habayit," a commentary on Shulchan Aruch.

Abraham Tiktin was considered one of the leaders of his generation. His colleague, Rabbi Akiva Eiger, wrote of him, "My low and weak opinion is nullified before the great opinion of this genius."

Among his students were Salomon Plessner, and Baruch Bendit Glikman.

== Books ==
Tiktin wrote at least 27 books, most of which were not published. The only book published in his lifetime was Petach Habayit on Shulchan Aruch.

Posthumously the following books were published:

- Petach Hayabit Derushim (Warsaw, 1916). The introduction includes a list of all his written works.
- Petach Habayit Davar Be'ito 1 (Warsaw, 1910) on Masechet Pesachim and laws of Passover.
- Petach Habait Davar Be'ito 2 (Warsaw, 1926) on the other festivals
- Petach Habayit on Emissaries for Kiddushin (Jerusalem, 2010)
- Pinot Habayit, Responsa (Warsaw, 1883)
