= Menahem of Merseburg =

15th-century German rabbi and author

Menaḥem of Merseburg (Hebrew: מנחם ממירזבורק) was a German rabbi and author who lived at Merseburg between 1420 and 1450.

Of his life few details are known. Jacob Weil (Responsa, No. 133) speaks of him as a great and prominent scholar; and he is mentioned also by Judah Minz, and by Solomon Luria in his commentary on the Talmud. Both of them identify him with Menahem Meïl Ẓedeḳ (Hebrew: מנחם מעיל צדק), while Azulai distinguishes between the two Menahems. According to Jacob Weil's allusions, Menahem must have lived in the first half of the fifteenth century.

Menahem wrote a collection of halakic notes ("Nimuke R. Menaḥem"), which forms an appendix to Weil's responsa (Hanau, 1630). This work, which was regarded as authoritative in all the communities in Saxony, deals with the rabbinical marriage laws, the civil code, and the taxation of the communities. In contrast to the meager scientific contributions of the German Jews of the period, who discussed little besides petty liturgical questions, Menahem's book shows his lively interest in all matters that concern Judaism. Of great practical importance was his ruling in reference to the "mi'un" (Hebrew: מיאון), or the decision that if a girl has been married during minority at the instance of her mother or brothers but not at the command of her father, she has the right, when she attains her majority, to dissolve the union without a bill of divorce. Menahem, considering this immoral, repealed the law by virtue of his authority; but in the following century his ruling was set aside, and the Talmudic law again went into force.
