= Meir Wahl =

- Prince of Poland; Head of House Katzenellenbogen
- Spouse: Hinda HaLevi Horowitz
- Issue: Baila
- House: Katzenellenbogen
- Father: Saul Wahl
- Religion: Judaism

Meir Wahl or Meir Wahl Katzenellenbogen, (also known as Meir Shauls and MaHaRaSH) was a Polish rabbi. He was the son of Saul Wahl, who according to legend, was king of Poland for one day.

At the beginning of his rabbinical career, Wahl was the Av Beit Din at Tykocin, Poland, later moving on to the Av Beit Din position of Brest, Belarus. Saul was integral in the formation of the Council of the Land of Lithuania in 1623, the controlling legal body for the Jews of Lithuania.

He married Hinda HaLevi Horowitz, granddaughter of Israel ben Josef and niece of Moses Isserles on her mother's side and his own mother's cousin. Wahl had a daughter named Baila who married Rabbi Yonah Teomim, who were parents to prominent rabbis. Another of his daughters, Nissla Gisela, married Moshe Hakohen Katz, a nephew of Meir Lublin.
