= Paulus Weidner =

Jewish convert to Christianity and Hebrew scholar (1525–1585)

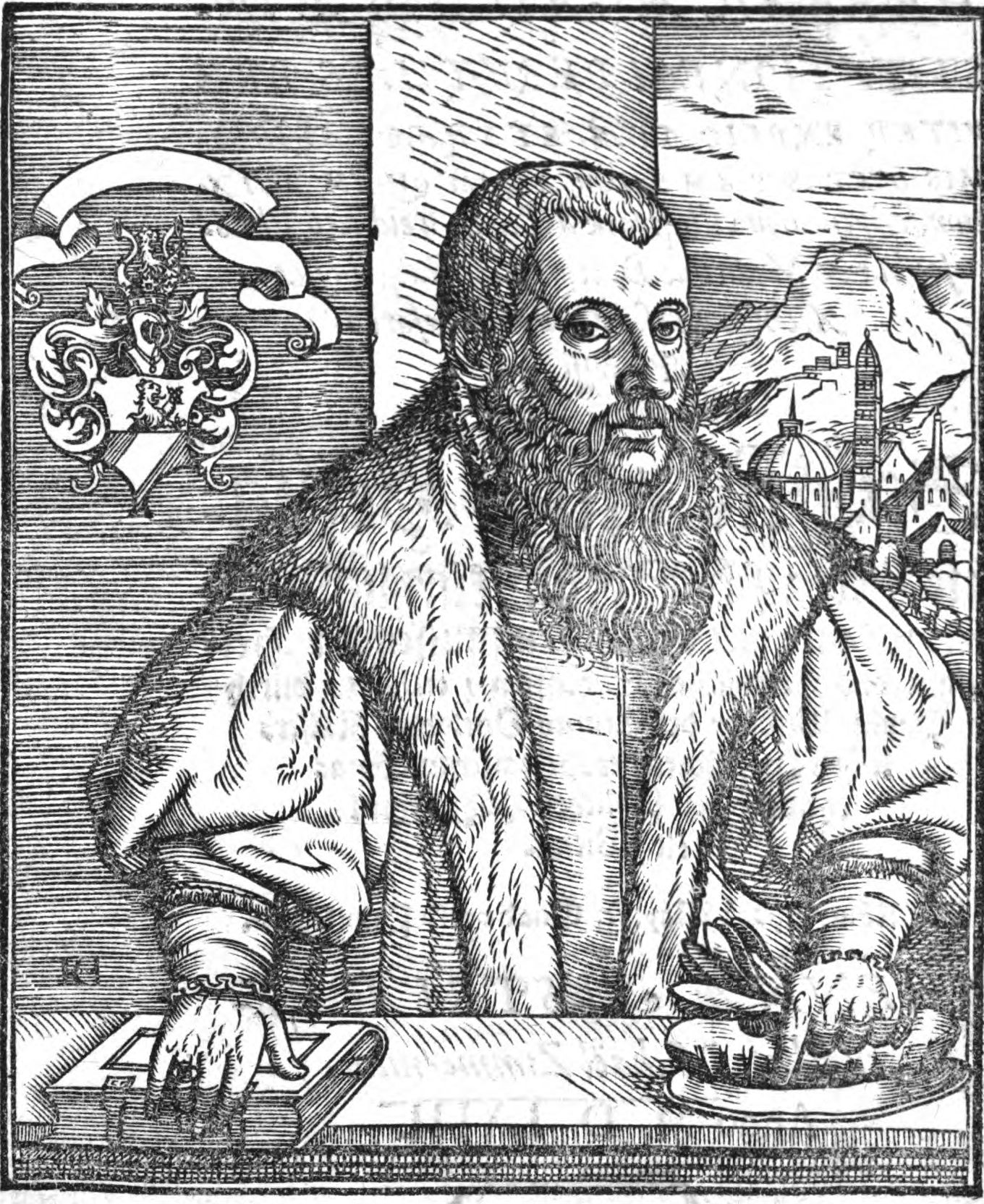
Weidner, aged 38, in Sententiae hebraicae ad vitae institutionem perutiles (1563)

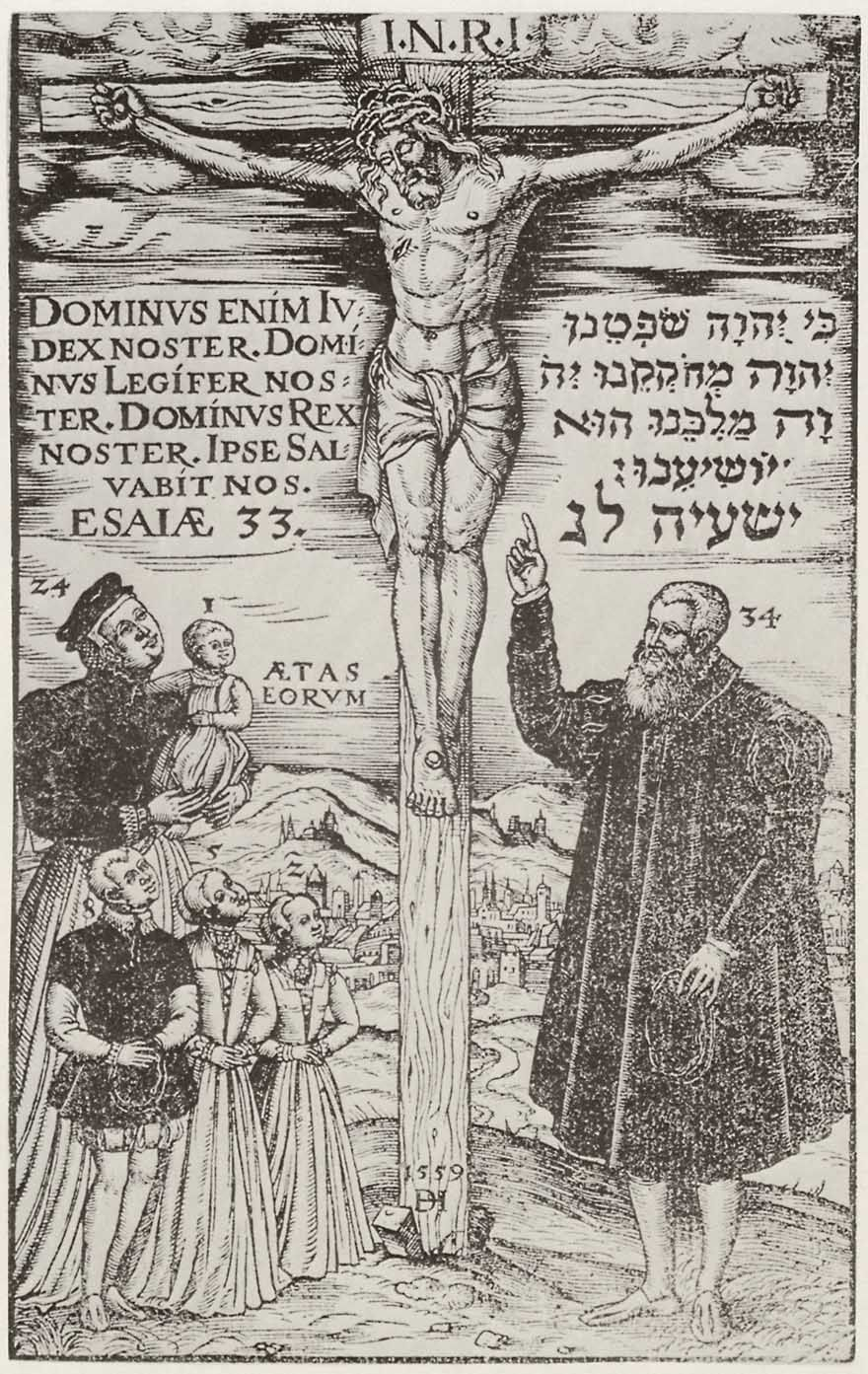
Christ on the cross worshiped by Weidner and his family (1559)

Paulus Weidner von Billerburg (né Nathan Ashkenazi; 1525–1585) was a Jewish convert to Christianity, a medical doctor, and professor of Hebrew at the University of Vienna.

== Life ==
Nathan Ashkenazi was born into a Jewish faith (the businessman and medical doctor Solomon Ashkenazi was an elder brother) in Carinthia. He studied medicine at the University of Padua, and practiced at Udine, from whence he was called back to his homeland by the Estates of Carinthia to practice medicine there.

During a six-year stay in Carinthia, after careful study of his and the Christian religion, he decided to become a Christian. Realising the danger that threatened him on the part of his co-religionists, he kept his intention secret for a year, and having made up his mind, he left Carinthia and went to Vienna.

Weidner joined the Roman Catholic Church in Vienna in 1558. He received thereafter the patronage of successive Austrian emperors, who employed him as personal physician and even consulted him on certain matters. On 13 March 1560, Emperor Ferdinand I confiscated all the Hebrew books of the Bohemian Jewry, and had them brought to Weidner in Vienna for scrutiny; he found no fault in them, and had them sent back to Prague.

Weidner was professor of Hebrew at the Vienna University, and was appointed by Imperial permission to preach occasionally to the Jews. He was six times dean of the faculty of medicine and thrice rector of the university. He was ennobled, with the title "von Billerburg", in 1582. He died in Vienna in 1585.

== Works ==
His first work, Loca Praecipua Fidei Christianae Collecta et Explicata (Vienna, 1559; 2nd edition 1562, with Epistola Hebr. ad R. Jehudam, Venet. Habitantem, cum Vessione Latina), is particularly aimed at the Jews, to convince them of the truth of Christianity. He dedicated this work, in the preface to which he gives information about his life and conversion, to Emperor Ferdinand. Weidner's last published work was Sententiae Hebraicae (1563), a collection of proverbs.

== See also ==
- History of Jewish conversion to Christianity

== Sources ==
- Pick, B. (1881). "Weidner, Paul". In McClintock, John; Strong, James (eds.). Cyclopædia of Biblical, Theological and Ecclesiastical Literature. Vol. 10.—Su–Z. New York: Harper & Brothers. p. 899.
- Skolnik, Fred; Berenbaum, Michael, eds. (2007). "Weidner, Paulus". In Encyclopaedia Judaica. 2nd ed. Vol. 20.—To–Wei. The Gale Group. p. 699. ISBN 978-0-02-865948-0.
- Wurzbach, Constantin von (1886). "Weidner, Paul". In Biographisches Lexikon des Kaiserthums Oesterreich. Vol. 53. Vienna: K.K. Hof- und Staatsdruckerei. p. 275.
