= Jacob Margolioth of Nuremberg =

German rabbi

Jacob Margolioth of Nuremberg (Hebrew: רבי יעקב בן משה מרגליות-יפה; January 1430 – 1492) was a 15th-century German rabbi and halakhic authority.

== Biography ==
In his early years, his family moved to Nuremberg, Germany, where Jacob studied. His contemporaries Joseph Colon and Judah Minz speak of him as one of the greatest rabbis of his time. It also appears that Jacob had a close relationship with Emperor Frederick III, who would submit Jewish disputes to Jacob. In one case, a quarrel between Moses Capsali and Joseph Colon, Jacob sided with the former. In another instance, he opposed Jacob Pollack, who is said to have been his pupil. In his later life, he authored a halakhic work known as "Seder Giṭṭin wa-Ḥaliẓah". Jacob later died around 1492 in Worms.
