= Binyamin Shlomo Hamburger =

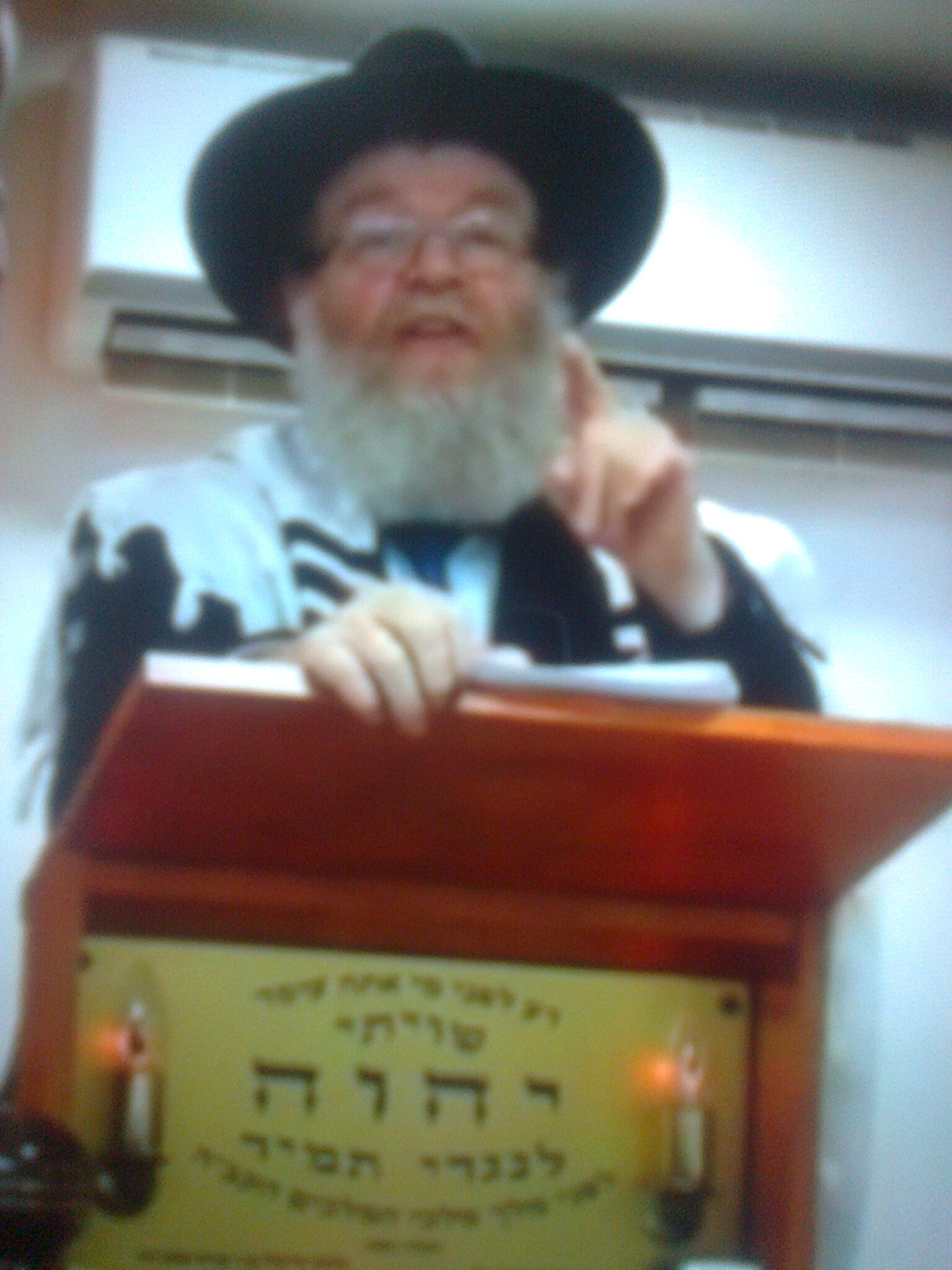
Binyamin Shlomo Hamburger

Binyamin Shlomo Hamburger (Hebrew: בנימין שלמה המבורגר) is a rabbi and author who is regarded as an expert on the subject of minhag Ashkenaz, the customs of German and Western European Jews, and their history. Born in Basel, Switzerland, to German parents, he currently lives in Bnei Brak, Israel.

Having originally been educated in Eastern European Jewish and Hasidic institutions, he came to explore his family's heritage after learning more about the traditions observed by his ancestor, Moses Sofer (1762–1839), the rabbinical authority better known as the "Chatam Sofer" after his writings. He commenced his research in the 1970s, and in the late 1980s founded the research institute מכון מורשת אשכנז (Machon Moreshes Ashkenaz, Center of Ashkenaz Heritage) to further these studies. A number of communities affiliated with the Institute, in Israel and the United States, now follow the Ashkenaz custom.

He is best known for a five-volume series of books titled שרשי מנהג אשכנז (Shorshei Minhag Ashkenaz, The Roots of Ashkenaz Custom) and an introductory volume on the importance of adhering to the Ashkenaz custom. An English synopsis of the work appeared in 2010.

He is also the author of the 1989 book משיחי השקר ומתנגדיהם (Meshichei Ha-Sheker U-Mitnagdeihem, False Messiahs and their Detractors), a historical work detailing many of the people who claimed to be the Jewish messiah, as well as a multi-volume work on the Yeshiva in Furth. A second edition of משיחי השקר ומתנגדיהם was published in 2009; in the foreword Hamburger records the negative reception (including book burning) of the work by some groups when it first appeared.
