= Salomon Plessner =

German rabbi and Bible commentator

Rabbi Salomon Plessner
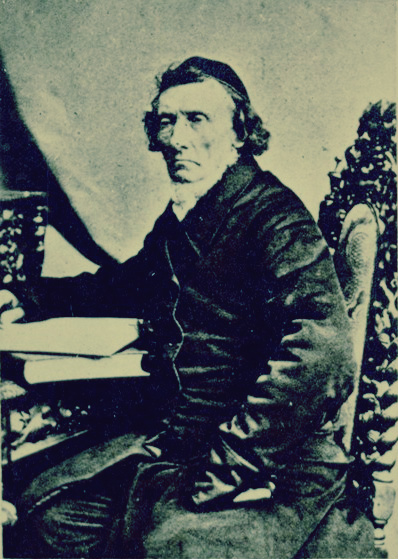

Personal life
- Born: 23 April 1797 Breslau, Kingdom of Prussia
- Died: 28 August 1883 (aged 86) Posen, German Empire
- Children: Elias Plessner
- Occupation: Maggid

Religious life
- Religion: Judaism

Salomon Plessner (Hebrew: שלמה בן ליב פלסנר; 23 April 1797 – 28 August 1883) was a German Jewish translator and maggid.

== Biography ==
Salomon Plessner was born in Breslau to Rabbi Yehuda Plesner, who died when Salomon was young. Having to support his mother and himself, Plessner engaged in business, but found time to study Hebrew, rabbinics, and German, under Wessely's influence. He published in 1819 a Hebrew translation of the Apocryphal additions to the Book of Esther, under the title Hosafah li-Megillat Ester, with a literary-historical introduction.

At the same time he became known as an eloquent maggid. Many of his sermons were published, among them his funeral oration on the death of Abraham Tiktin, under the title Zekher Tzaddik li-Brakhah (1821). Through his sermons and his close association with Rabbi Akiva Eger, Plessner became known as a defender of Orthodox Judaism against the growing Reform movement. Forbidden by the police from delivering sermons, he in 1823 settled in Festenberg, Silesia. He presented a defense of the Talmud to the Posen government in 1826, prompting the government to revoke a decree forbidding Talmudic instruction in schools.

Plessner moved to Berlin in 1830, where he earned a livelihood by lecturing in the Berlin beit midrash. In 1832 his Nozelim min Lebanon was published, consisting of a Hebrew translation of a part of the Apocrypha, with an appendix, entitled Duda'im, containing exegetical notes, verses in Hebrew and German, and sermons. The following year he was invited to dedicate the new synagogue at Bromberg, for which occasion he composed poems in Hebrew and in German, which were published under the title Shirim la-Ḥanukkat Bet ha-Tefillah (1834). He left Berlin and settled in Posen in 1843, where he remained active as a maggid, chiefly at the Neuschul.
