= Seligman Baer Bamberger =

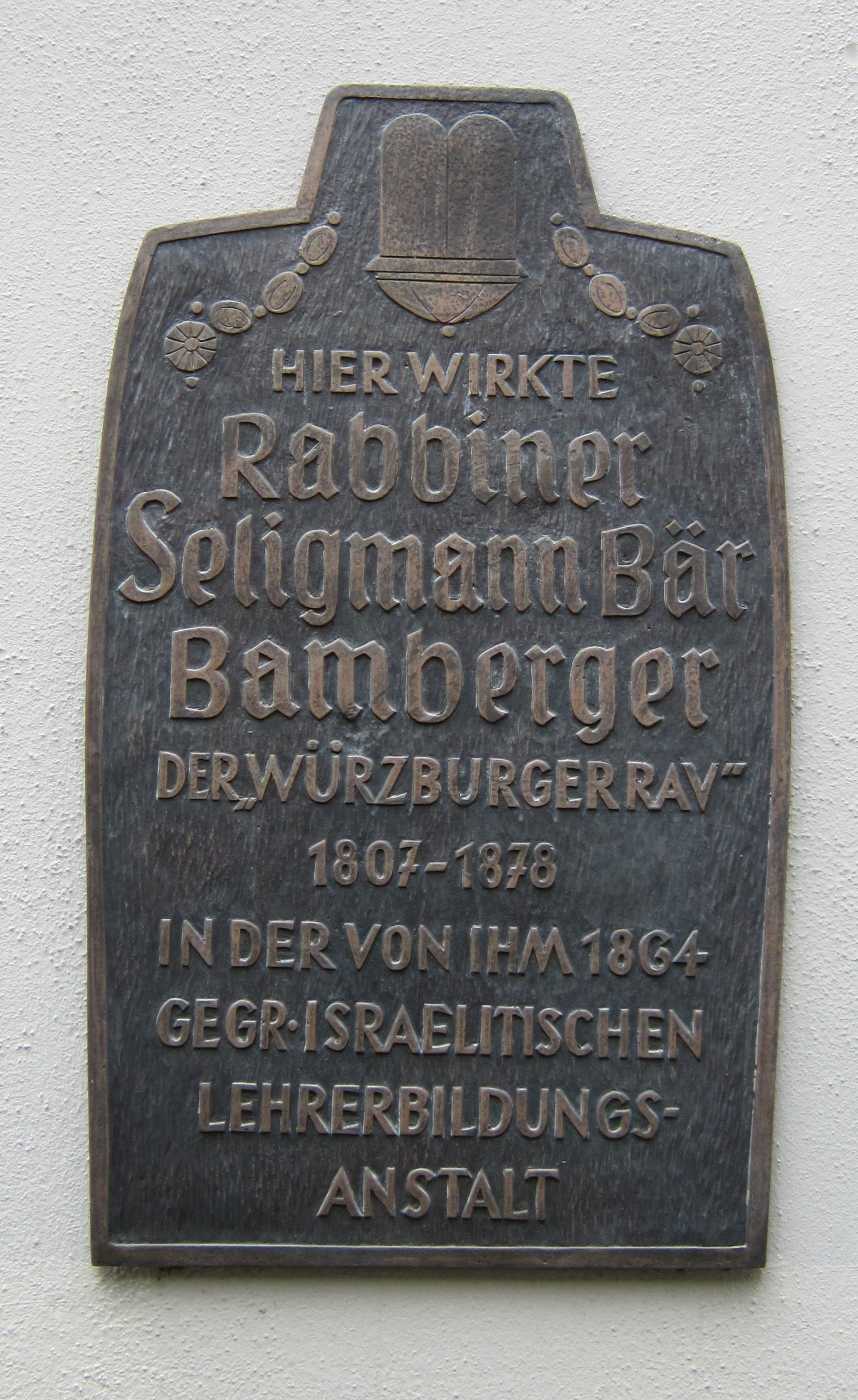
Rabbi Seligmann Bär Bamberger memorial plate at Würzburg Lehrerbildungsanstalt, Domerschulstraße 6, Jüdische Gemeinde Würzburg

Seligman Baer (Isaac Dov) Bamberger (born Wiesenbronn, near Kitzingen, Bavaria, 6 November 1807; died Würzburg 13 October 1878) was a Talmudist and a leader of Orthodox Judaism in Germany. Between 1840 and his death he served as rabbi of Würzburg, and is therefore often referred to by his position as the Würzburger Rav.

== Life ==
He commenced his yeshiva studies in Fürth at the age of fifteen, under Rabbis Wolf Hamburger and Judah Leib Halberstadt. Five years later he received semicha (rabbinic ordination), but did not enter the rabbinate because a university degree was required for that in 19th-century Germany. He opened a general business store in Kitzingen. The store was not successful (possibly because Bamberger preferred to spend as much time as possible studying Talmud). He married two years later, to the daughter of Rabbi Seckel Wormser of Fulda.

=== Würzburg ===
In 1838 he represented the Orthodox camp at a conference instigated by the Bavarian government at which several Reform-minded notables had hoped to bring about changes in the organisation of the Jewish communities. As a result of his success at this conference he was invited to succeed Abraham Bing as rabbi of Würzburg. There, already in 1840, he opened a yeshiva, important on the German Jewish landscape, and where he "exerted a great influence" on his pupils. Thereafter, in 1855 he opened an elementary school, the first of its kind in Germany: previously children had been instructed in small synagogue schools.

=== ILBA ===
In 1864 he opened a seminary specifically for the training of teachers of Jewish subjects, of which there was a shortage in Germany. This seminary was called Bais Medrash L'Morim (בית מדרש למורים - A House of Learning for Teachers) or in German Israelitische Lehrerbildungsanstalt ("Jewish Teacher Training Institute") often referred to by its initials ILBA ILBA survived until 1938; its teachers and students were deported to the Buchenwald and Dachau concentration camps.

=== The Austrittsgesetz ===
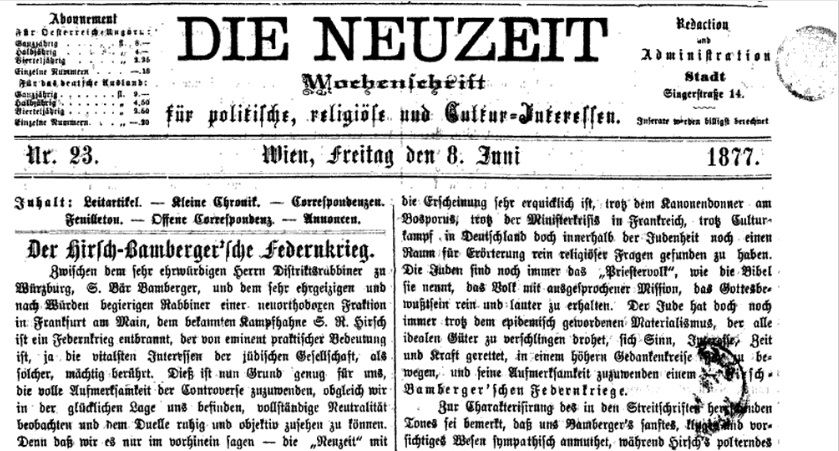
A column in the Vienna-based newspaper Die Neuzeit about the aside incident.

On 28 July 1876 the German parliament passed the Austrittsgesetz, which allowed Jews to secede from their religious community. Many Jewish communities had by that time been dominated by the Reform movement, with Orthodox members forming informal groups (minyanim) to represent their interests. Following the passing of the Austrittsgesetz, Rabbi Samson Raphael Hirsch of Frankfurt, who had campaigned for the law to be passed, declared that Orthodox Jews in Frankfurt had the duty to officially secede from the Liberal Grossgemeinde. Bamberger visited Frankfurt, and declared that this was not mandatory. A heated exchange of open letters followed between the rabbis. The conflict ultimately led to only a relatively small number of Orthodox Jews seceding from the main community, and until the Second World War there were two Orthodox communities in Frankfurt: one under the auspices of the Grossgemeinde and the other one being Hirsch's community Adath Yeshurun.

== Works ==
Bamberger was one of the last rabbinical writers in Germany. His first work was Melecheth Shamayim (מלאכת שמים - The Work of the Heavens, Altona, 1853, a reference to the Babylonian Talmud, Eruvin 13a) on the laws pertaining to Torah scrolls, tefillin (phylacteries) and mezuzot (door scrolls). It was republished in 2022.

A work first published in 1858 titled Amirah le-Beth Ya'akov (אמירה לבית יעקב - Words to the House of Jacob, a reference to Exodus 19:2 and Rashi's commentary there) deals with the three areas of practical Jewish law pertaining specifically to women: niddah (separation during menstruation), challah (a tithe from dough) and the lighting of candles on the night of the Shabbat. [There is also a section dealing with the laws of Melicho.] Originally published in his native German, subsequent publications have been made in multiple languages. The original Hebrew translation was produced by Rabbi Simcha Bamberger. An English translation was produced by Rabbi I. Nathan Bamberger. More than a dozen editions have been published to date. It has been widely translated and is still in use today. The famed Korban Mincha Siddur (סידור קרבן מנחה) includes a copy of the Amirah le-Beth Ya'akov. Other rabbis including Shlomo Zalman Auerbach and Rabbi Tzvi Pesach Frank wrote additions to this work which are part of the newest editions.

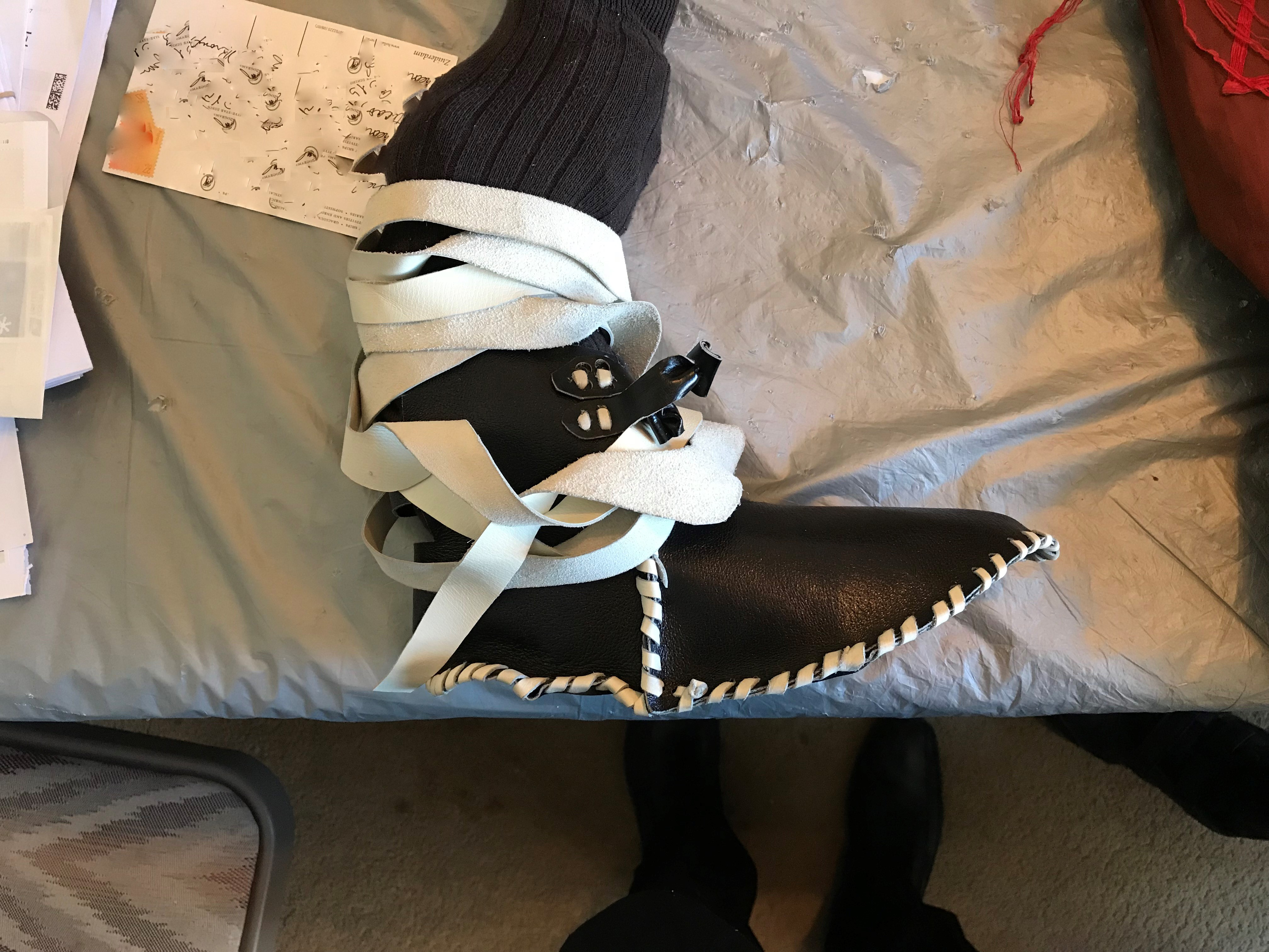
A modern day chalitza shoe designed after the chalitza shoe used by the Würzburger Rav, Rabbi Seligmann Bär Bamberger.

Moreh la-Zovechim (מורה לזבחים - Teacher for those who bring Sacrifices, 1863) deals with the practical laws of shechita (ritual slaughter). Nachalath Devash (נחלי דבש - An Inheritance of Honey, 1867) deals primarily with the halizah ritual, and his work Yitzchak Yeranen (יצחק ירנן - Isaac will Rejoice, 1861-2, a reference to the Sabbath afternoon prayers) is a commentary on Shaarei Simcha (שערי שמחה) by Rabbi Yehuda ibn Gayat. This work in particular was a great breakthrough in the world of academia since it was the first time that this manuscript had been printed. Koreh be-Emeth (קורא באמת - Reading in Truth, 1871 and 1879, a reference to Psalms 145:18) addresses Torah exegesis where Talmud or Midrash use changes in letters to derive meanings from particular words.

In 1850 he published a pamphlet outlining the attitude towards non-Jews in the Talmud. This was intended to inform a debate in the Bavarian parliament on civil rights for the Jews.

== Sources ==
- N. Bamberger, Rabbiner Seligman Bär Bamberger, Würzburg, 1897;
- Meyer Kayserling, in Gedenkblätter, 1892, p. 6; in Allgemeine Zeitung des Judenthums, 1878, p. 716;
