= Meir Katzenellenbogen =

German rabbi (c. 1482–1565)

Rabbi Meir Katzenellenbogen

Personal life
- Born: c. 1482
- Died: 12 January 1565
- Spouse: Hannah bat Abraham Minz
- Children: Samuel Judah
- Parent(s): Yitzhak ben Moshe; Julia-Malka Luria

Religious life
- Religion: Judaism

Meir ben Isaac Katzenellenbogen (c. 1473 – 12 January 1565) (also, Meir of Padua, or Maharam Padua, Hebrew: מאיר בן יצחק קצנלנבויגן) was a German rabbi born in Katzenelnbogen.

== Biography ==
Meïr ben Isaac, who was often called after his native town, was the founder of the Katzenellenbogen family. His mother Julia-Malka Luria was the granddaughter of Rabbi Aharon Luria, founder of the Luria family and his wife Rabbanit Miriam Shapira-Luria, who was a descendant of Rashi via his second daughter Miriam. After studying at Prague under the well-known casuist Jacob Pollak, he went to Padua and entered the yeshiva of Judah Minz, whose granddaughter, Hannah, he afterwards married. He succeeded his father-in-law, Abraham Minz, in the chief rabbinate of Padua, which office he held until his death on 12 January 1565 (epitaph below). He was the father of Samuel Judah Katzenellenbogen.

Meïr was also nominal rabbi of Venice, where he went several times a year, but he had his fixed residence at Padua. Meïr was considered by his contemporaries a great authority on Talmudic and rabbinical matters, and many rabbis consulted him, among them: Moses Alashkar, Obadiah Sforno, and his relative Moses Isserles (who addressed him as "rabbi of Venice"). It may be seen from his responsa (ninety in number, published by himself, with those of Judah Minz, under the title of She'elot u-Teshubot, Venice, 1553), as well as from those of Isserles, that he was disposed to be liberal in his decisions. Another indication of his leaning toward liberalism was his use in his responsa (Nos. 38, 49, 72) of the civil names of the months, a thing not done by other rabbis of his time.

Joseph ben Mordechai Gershon says (She'erit Yosef, pp. 3b) that Meïr, in one of his responsa, told him not to rely at that time on his opinion, because he could not verify his decision by the Talmud, all the copies of which had been burned. This burning is mentioned by David Gans (Ẓemaḥ Dawid, p. 56, Warsaw, 1890) and by Heilprin (Seder haDorot, i.245, ed. Maskileison) as having occurred in 1553 or 1554 under Pope Julius III, at the instigation of certain baptized Jews. Meïr states also (Responsa, No. 78) that in Candia the hafṭarah for Yom Kippur Minḥah was, with the exception of the first three verses, read in Greek (comp. Zunz, G.V. p. 413, note). In Responsum No. 86 he speaks of the plague that raged at Venice, but without indicating the year. Many of his responsa are to be found in the collection of Isserles. Meïr added to the edition of his responsa his father-in-law's Seder Giṭṭin wa-Ḥaliẓah, and a detailed index. He edited also Maimonides' Yad, with some commentaries, to which he added notes of his own (Venice, 1550; see Isserles).

Cecil Roth, History of the Jews in Venice, page 256. In 1549 Katezenellenbogen became embroiled in the Bragadin-Giustiniani dispute over the publication of a printed edition of Maimonides' Mishneh Torah. Since Jews could not own printing presses at that time, presses were owned by Venetian noblemen and operated by Jews under the patronage of the non-Jewish owner. Rabbi Katzenellenbogen edited a printed edition of the Mishneh Torah to be published by the Bragadini press. That work was soon pirated by the rival Giustiniani press. Rabbi Katzenellenbogen appealed to his relative Moses Isserles, who replied that the Giustiniani edition violated the prohibition on Hasogas gevul, interfering with another person's livelihood. The Giustiniani parties denounced the rival publishers to the non-Jewish censors, leading to a massive burning of volumes of the Talmud and other Jewish works in the Venetian Republic.

Katzenellenbogen was the author of ninety responsa published under the title, She'eilot U'teshuvot. Katzenellenbogen's epitaph reads:

The heavens are clothed in darkness
And we don sackcloth
Because of the departure of a saint
The foundation of the world, a prince pure
Who submitted with complete faith
To God and his religion
Better was his name than the choicest oil
Head of the Diaspora, Meir, a righteous man
Who departed on the 10th of Shvat
In the year 1565 this saint departed.

His wife Hannah's epitaph reads:

The Lord took Hannah for himself – unto her resting place
Unto her soul was he gracious – which lies to the right of her father
A learned sage was he, mighty – an example unto his generation
Rabbi Abraham her father.
Her husband was Meir, a – Prince of Padua
Who gave light to all the world – who was watched from the heavens above.

== Some notable descendants ==
Rabbi Katzenellenbogen had many notable descendants.

- Herbert L. Anderson
- Meir Bar-Ilan
- Max Beloff, Baron Beloff
- Martin Buber
- Andrew Denton
- Baron Henry DeWorms
- Judy Franz
- Felix Gilbert
- Chaim Halberstam
- David Halberstam
- Abraham Joshua Heschel
- Eyran Katsenelenbogen
- David Tevel Katzenellenbogen
- John Katzenellenbogen
- Samuel Judah Katzenellenbogen
- Julius Klein
- Jean Longuet
- Karl Marx
- Benjamin Mazar
- Felix Mendelssohn
- Chanoch Dov Padwa
- Franz Reizenstein
- Baron Guy de Rothschild
- Helena Rubinstein
- Howard F. Sachs
- Max Schur
- Ephraim Avigdor Speiser
- DeWitt Stetten Jr.
- Otto Warburg
- Baron George Weidenfeld
- Basil Wigoder
- Catherine Yronwode

== Bibliography ==
- Azulai, Shem ha-Gedolim, i
- Eisenstadt-Wiener, Da'at Ḳedoshim, p. 82
- Fränkel, in Orient. Lit. vii.609–613
- Fürst, Bibl. Jud. ii.179
- Ghirondi, in Kerem. Ḥemed, iii.93 et seq.
- Rosenstein, Neil. The Unbroken Chain, C.I.S. Publishers, The Computer Center for Jewish Genealogy, Elizabeth, New Jersey, 1990. ISBN 0-9610578-4-X. (Rosenstein is a descendent, too)
- Steinschneider, Cat. Bodl. col. 1702
- M. Straschun, in Fuenn's Ḳiryah Ne'emanah, pp. 321 et seq.
- Zipser, in Orient. Lit. ix.367
