= Graziadio Nepi =

Italian rabbi & physician (1759–1836)

Personal life
- Born: 1759 Ferrara, Papal States
- Died: 18 January 1836 (aged 76–77) Cento, Papal States

Religious life
- Religion: Judaism

Graziadio (Hananel) Nepi (Hebrew: חננאל ניפי, romanized: Ḥananʼel Neppi; 1759 – 18 January 1836), also known by the acronym Ḥen (ח״ן), was an Italian rabbi, Kabbalist, and physician.

== Biography ==
Graziadio Nepi studied at Ferrara for twelve years under Rabbi Jacob Moses Ayash and subsequently was himself the teacher of many disciples in his native city. On account of his great Talmudic learning he was sent as deputy to the Assembly of Jewish Notables convened by Napoleon I at Paris in 1806. Upon his return he was called to the congregation at Cento, where he held the position of rabbi until his death, his pupil Isaac Reggio becoming his successor at Ferrara.

Nepi, who lived an ascetic life, was one of the highest religious authorities of his time in Italy. Among his publications were Livyat Ḥen, a collection of the responsa which he sent to different rabbis, and Derushim, a collection of his sermons. His Zekher tsadikim li-verakhah, consisting of biographical and bibliographical sketches of rabbis and Jewish scholars, was intended to complete Azulai's Shem ha-gedolim but left unfinished. It was completed by M. S. Ghirondi under the title Toledot gedole Yisrael, and published by the latter's son (Triest, 1853). A catalogue of his library was published in Lemberg in 1873.

== Selected publications ==
- Shir le-ḥanokh bet ha-knesset be-ir Cento. Florence. 1827.
- Toledot gedole Yisrael. Toldot geʾone Yiśraʾel. Trieste: Tipografia Marenigh. 1853. hdl:2027/hvd.hwmqdb.
- Likutim mi-kitve ha-rav Ḥananʼel Neppi. Ferrara. 1908.
