= Mordecai Ghirondi =

Italian rabbi and writer

Mordecai Samuel Ghirondi
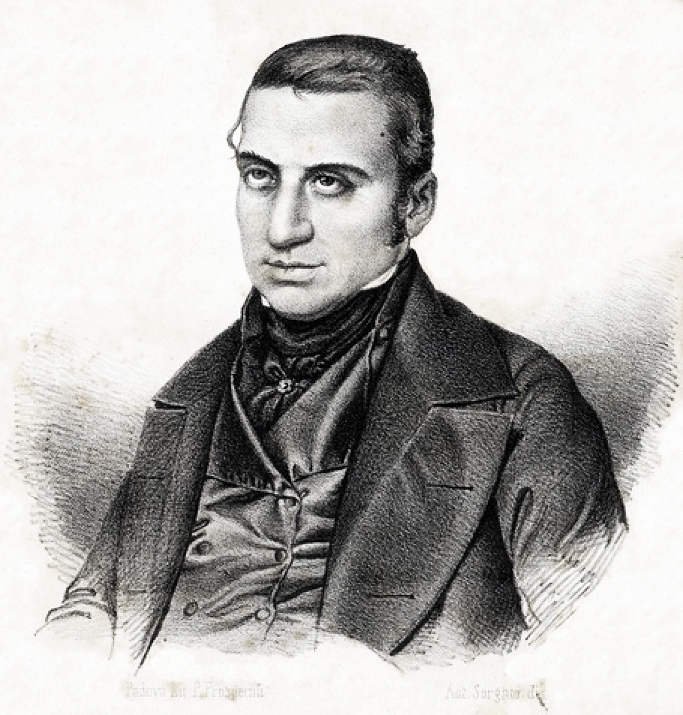

Personal life
- Born: October 1799 Padua, Venetian Province, Habsburg monarchy
- Died: 4 January 1852 (aged 52) Padua, Kingdom of Lombardy–Venetia, Austrian Empire

Religious life
- Religion: Judaism
- Position: Chief Rabbi of Padua
- Began: 1831
- Ended: 1852

Mordecai Samuel ben Benzion Aryeh Ghirondi (Hebrew: מרדכי שמואל בן בן־ציון אריה גירונדי; October 1799 – January 4, 1852) was an Italian Jewish author and Chief Rabbi of Padua.

== Biography ==
Mordecai Samuel Ghirondi was born into a rabbinic family in Padua. He studied at the rabbinical college of Padua, where he was later appointed professor of theology (1824). In 1829, he was appointed assistant rabbi of Padua; two years later he became chief rabbi. He was a recognized authority in rabbinics, and was consulted by rabbis of several communities.

Ghirondi was an avid bibliophile, and parts of his book collection are now in the Montefiore Library in Jews' College in London and the Jewish Theological Seminary in New York.

Among his publications were Tokho ratzuf ahavah, a work on ethics produced when he was only sixteen years old (Pisa, 1818), and Ma'amar keriyyat ha-borot, a treatise on artesian wells, showing references to them in the Talmud (printed in I. S. Reggio's Iggerot yosher, Vienna, 1834). His most important work, Toledot gedole Yisrael, is a biographical and bibliographical dictionary of Italian rabbis and secular scholars.

Ghirondi had in his possession Graziadio Nepi's biographical work entitled Zekher tzaddikim; to this he added 831 numbers of his own, two-thirds of which are not found in any earlier biographical dictionary. The combined work was published by Ephraim Raphael Ghirondi, the author's son: Nepi's and Ghirondi's were printed on opposite pages (Trieste, 1853). The latter also wrote Kevutzat kesef, responsa, in two parts, and Likkute shoshannim, novellæ, in two volumes (both unpublished). Letters of Ghirondi's on different subjects were published in Kerem Ḥemed (ii. 52; iii. 88 et seq.; iv. 13).
