= Moses ben Isaac ha-Levi Minz =

German rabbi

Moses ben Isaac ha-Levi Minz (15th century) was a German rabbi, a disciple of R. Yaakov Weil and contemporary of Israel Isserlein, whom he frequently consulted. He was successively rabbi at Mainz, Landau, Bamberg, and Posen. He is one of the first known Jewish Scholars to have officiated as Rav of a city in Poland.

In his responsa (No. 114) he mentions a certain Jacob Margolioth of לוקו (Lucca?), and refers to a case of divorce in Posen in 1444 (Steinschneider gives 1474). Fränkel (Zeitschrift, iii. 387) doubts that Moses ever was at Posen. He suggests that פוזנו (Posen) is a printer's mistake for פיזרו (Pesaro). Moses' responsa (Cracow, 1617) mention also Joseph Colon, Israel Isserlein, and his cousin Judah Minz. Responsum No. 46 contains a dispute over a philological point with Eliezer Treves (comp. M. Wiener in Monatsschrift, xvi. 390).

In his later years, he intended to make Aliyah and made preparations for the journey, but ultimately abandoned the plan.

== Jewish Encyclopedia bibliography ==
- Azulai, Shem ha-Gedolim, i.140;
- David Conforte, Ḳore ha-Dorot, p. 27b;
- Julius Fürst, Bibl. Jud. ii.380;
- Moritz Steinschneider, Cat. Bodl. cols. 1946–1947.
