= History of responsa in Judaism =

Religious legal rulings by rabbis

The history of responsa in Judaism (Hebrew: שאלות ותשובות, Sephardic: She'elot Utshuvot, Ashkenazic: Sheilos Utshuvos; usually shortened to שו"ת Shu"t) spans a period of 1,700 years. Rabbinic responsa constitute a special class of Rabbinic literature, differing in form but not necessarily in content from Rabbinic commentaries devoted to the exegesis of the Bible, the Mishnah, the Talmud, and Halakha (Jewish law). The codes themselves contain the rules for ordinary incidents of life. The responsa literature covers all these topics and more.

The mode, style, and subject matter have changed as a function of the Jewish people's travels and the development of other halakhic literature, particularly the codes. Formulation of responsa, or she'elot ve-t'shuvot (questions and replies), generally involves an individual or group asking Jewish educators, legal decisors, rabbis, or heads of yeshivas about a predicament or topic for which the Halakha is unclear or non-existent and the responding party responding via informal or formal correspondence. Responsa remain important components of the Jewish legal system, being developed based on questions posed today. The development of responsa literature is divided into six periods: Tannaitic, Geonic, first Rabbinic, second Rabbinic, third Rabbinic, and fourth Rabbinic.

== Talmudic era ==
Title page of Rambam's Iggeret Teiman

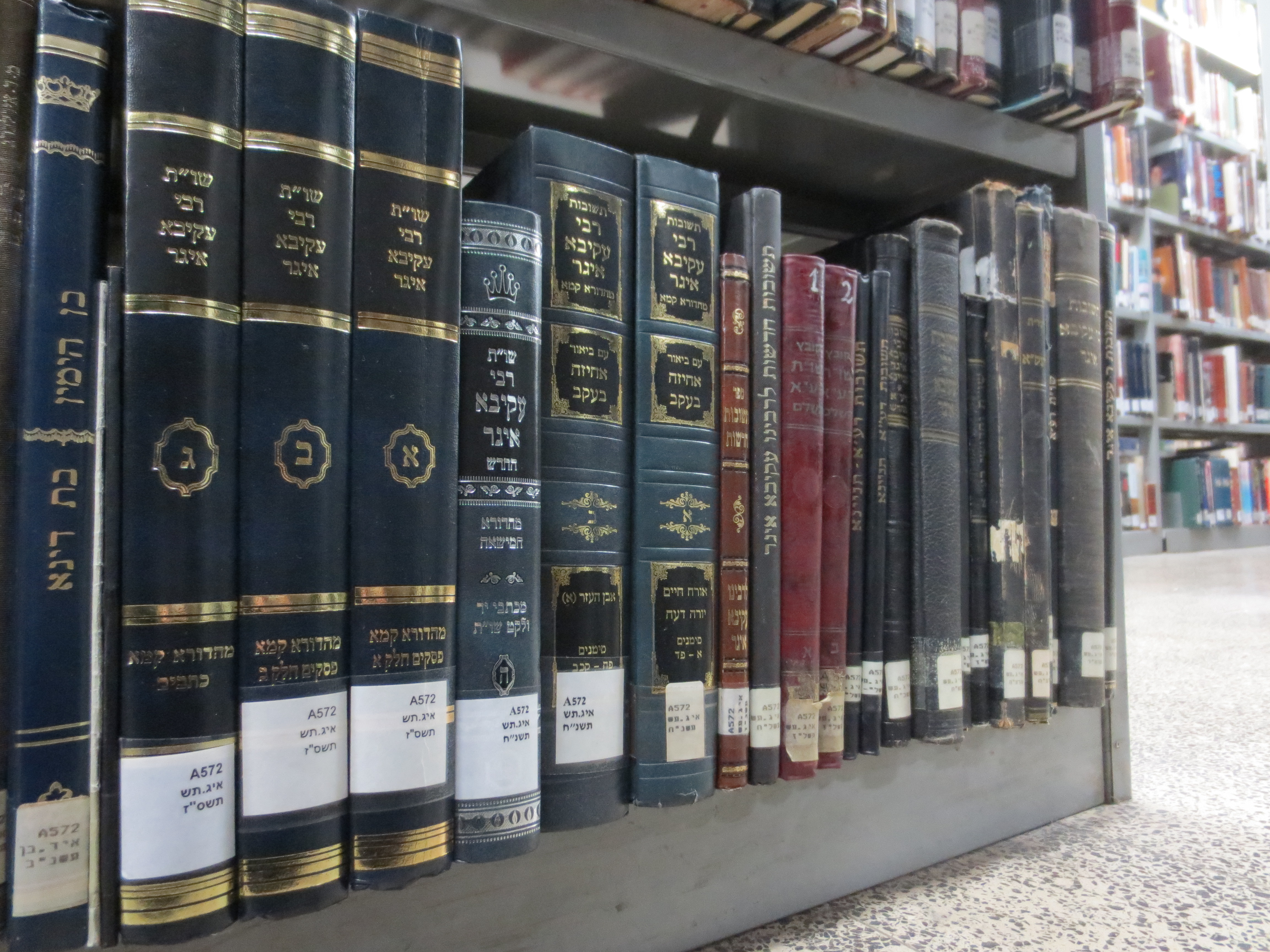
Collected Responsa of Akiva Eger, Bar-Ilan University Library

Responsum of Rabbi Shmuel Wosner, Shevet HaLevi, concerning the status of translated works of Torah, in response to a question from Rabbi Shlomo Sztencl.

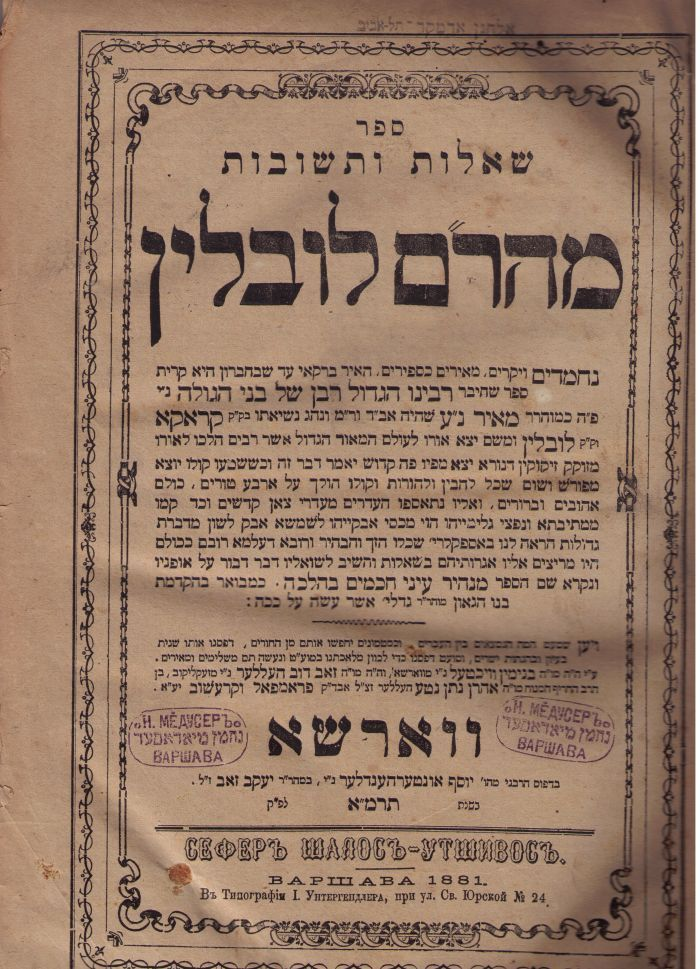
Responsa of "Maharam" Meir Lublin

The responsa of the first five centuries are not contained in special works; they are scattered through the writings of both Talmuds (the Babylonian Talmud and the Jerusalem Talmud). Works devoted especially to responsa first appear in the post-Talmudic period. Many responsa have been lost, but those extant number hundreds of thousands, in almost a thousand known collections.

=== Pre-Mishnaic era ===
No responsa are known to exist from before the Mishnah (200 CE); it is doubtful whether any were written before this period. A tradition held that no halakha (law) should be written down (see Oral Torah). Even when reluctance to write down rulings became obsolete, letters of a legal nature might be written only in cases where laws might likewise be reduced to writing. While the rule prevailed that no laws should be written, no communications of legal content were made by means of letters. Questions were usually communicated orally, or proposed to the academy by a teacher, who transmitted the answer and decision by word of mouth. The rarity of letters on legal problems in the Tannaitic era (the period the Mishnah covers) may be seen from a passage in the Tosefta, which states that Rabbi Gamliel secretly dispatched a messenger with an answer to a question; for if he desired to keep his decision secret, he would probably have sent a letter had such replies been customary at that time.

=== Mishnaic era ===
In the Tannaitic period (100 BCE to 200 CE) statements, publications, contributions concerning the calendar, and notifications were the only documents regularly committed to writing. On the other hand, it can not positively be asserted that no ruling at all had been given in writing before the completion of the Mishnah: certain exceptions were doubtless made.

=== In the Talmud ===
Immediately after the completion of the Mishnah, when the prohibition or reluctance against writing halakhot had in great part disappeared, the responsa literature began to appear, traces being preserved in the Talmud. Often questions were settled by a single letter, as was later the case with the Geonim, who exchanged a series of responsa. The replies were signed by pupils and colleagues, so that, strictly speaking, the responsa were issued by a board.

With the beginning of the third century of the common era, responsa begin to frequently appear in letters from Babylonia to Israel. By the end of the third century the correspondence between Israel and Babylonia had become more active, and the responsa from the one to the other had become far more numerous. These rulings from rabbis in Israel seem to have been regarded as authoritative and demanding obedience; and the threat was made to Rabbi Judah ben Ezekiel, head of the Academy of Pumbedita, that a letter would be brought from "the West" (i.e., Israel) to annul his decision. The same experience befell and Mar Ukba and another, unnamed, judge.

== Geonim ==
During the Geonic period (650–1250 CE), the Babylonian schools were the chief centers of Jewish learning; the Geonim, the heads of these schools, were recognized as the highest authorities in Jewish law. Despite difficulties that hampered the irregular communications of the period, Jews who lived even in most distant countries sent their inquiries concerning religion and law to these officials in Babylonia. It was common for Jews outside of Babylon to ask to be sent a section of the Talmud along with “its explanation” or to ask the scholars in Babylon to settle Jewish arguments for which they could not find any precedent. The length of a responsum from this period can span from less than a sentence to a large book. Many of the responsa are still being studied today in the Cairo Genizah. In the yeshiva during this time period, students and scholars would discuss these halakhic questions during kallah and then the head of the yeshiva would announce his decision and the leaders in the yeshiva would sign it. Another type of responsa were those that were more time-sensitive, so the gaon usually responded to them right away and with many different sections in order to answer multiple questions that were posed. Later Geonim also referred to the responsa and commentaries of earlier Geonim when writing responsa.

Later in the geonic period (from the mid-tenth to mid-eleventh centuries), their supremacy suffered, as the study of the Talmud received care in other lands. The inhabitants of these regions gradually began to submit their questions to the heads of the schools of their own countries. Eventually they virtually ceased sending questions to Babylonian Geonim, so that during this period responsa of eminent rabbis of other lands appeared side by side with geonic rulings.

== Rishonim ==
The period of the rishonim, or the First Rabbinic Epoch, primarily consists of the writings from 11th and 12th century Spanish and French schools. With the decline of the gaonate in the first half of the eleventh century, it ceased to be seen as the central spiritual authority for Jews worldwide. From then on, questions were sent to the rabbinical authorities of one's own or a neighboring country. Thus, inquiries sent during this period to Babylonia were rare and exceptional.

=== Characteristics ===
- The questions were not all practical. Many were theoretical, concerning the correct interpretation of a halakic or haggadic passage in the Talmud. In their discussion of theoretical problems, the responsa of Spanish scholars are noteworthy for the untrammeled scientific spirit that permeates them, far more than those of the French school. Even in responsa that are practical in nature, a distinction may be drawn between the two schools. Although these responsa can still be found in significant response anthologies today, they are not as significant as the responsa written during the Geonic period.
- The responsa of the epoch came from various countries, and from schools having different tendencies, thus showing the position and the type of spiritual life in general and of Talmudic learning in particular, since all these factors prevailed in the different countries at the time. Especially noteworthy is the divergence between the French and the Spanish school in the twelfth century, the second half of this period. For the most part the rulings of this period receive their basis or their confirmation from a passage in the Talmud, and in this motivation the difference between the French and the Spanish exegesis of the Talmud is clearly shown. The Spanish school was the more logical, and strove for brevity and lucidity in the deduction of its rulings from the Talmud, while the French school was more dialectic, and frequently gave full play to casuistry at the expense of clearness.

=== Eleventh century ===
- The chief representative of the French school in the eleventh century was Solomon ben Isaac (Rashi), and many of his responsa have been preserved in the "Pardes" and in the Mahzor Vitry. His decisions are written in Hebrew, without formulas either of introduction or of conclusion, although an interesting phrase that is peculiar to him, and was apparently invented by him occurs once: "I, the undersigned, was asked whether ... thus have I heard from my teachers, and thus is my own opinion likewise inclined,..." the ruling being followed by the signature "Solomon b. Isaac", without any concluding formula (Mahzor Vitry, pp. 434–435).
- The leader of the Spanish school in the same century was Isaac Alfasi, who left many responsa, an entire collection being printed at Livorno in 1780, under the title "She'elot u-Teshubot ha-RIF" (Rabbi Isaac Alfasi). These decisions were written in Arabic, and were translated into Hebrew at an early date, being extant only in this version.

=== Twelfth century ===
- The chief representatives of the French school of the twelfth century were Jacob Tam, Abraham ben David of Posquières, and Eliezer ben Nathan of Mayence.
  - The responsa of Rabbi Tam are contained in his "Sefer ha-Yashar" as well as in the works of other authorities, such as Meir of Rothenburg and Mordechai ben Hillel, "the Mordecai".
  - The responsa of Eliezer ben Nathan, contained in his "Even ha-Ezer", are partly exegetic in character and partly devoted to practical decisions.
  - The responsa of Abraham ben David are included in the collection titled "Tummat Yesharim" or "Temim De'im" (Venice, 1622). Particularly noteworthy is his injunction that Jewish law obligates Jews to follow the laws of the land, i.e., to follow the laws of the secular government in which a Jewish community found itself living. This ruling is based on the Talmudic saying: "The law of the land is valid" (ib. responsum No. 50).
- The chief representatives of the Spanish school in the twelfth century were Joseph ibn Migash and Maimonides. The responsa of ibn Migash include both practical decisions and explanations of difficult passages in the Mishnah and the Talmud, the first group being written in Arabic and later translated into Hebrew, while the greater portion of the second category was composed by the author himself in the Talmudic Hebrew idiom.

=== Thirteenth century ===
The Second Rabbinic Epoch consists of responsa from Spanish and Frenco-German schools in the 13th and 14th centuries. Nahmanides and R. Solomen ben Adret were two of the big scholars during this period. These responsa were written about a wide range of topics including Talmudic passages, ethics, religious philosophy, and more. In this period the difference between the Spanish and the Franco-German forms of responsa vanished. On the one hand, the scientific spirit of the Spanish school partially entered the academies of southern France, and, on the other hand, the dialecticism of the French rabbis steadily increased in influence in Spain.

- The chief representatives of the Spanish responsa in the thirteenth century were Nahmanides (Rabbi Moshe ben Nahman), Rabbi Solomon ben Adret, and Rabbi Nissim ben Reuben.
  - Very few responsa by Nahmanides have been preserved. Those that exist are contained in a work titled "She'elot u-Teshubot" (Venice, 1523; Zolkiev, 1798), in which are included in great part the responsa of Solomon ben Adret. To him came questions from the most distant communities. His responsa number about three thousand, and in content are partly practical and partly devoted to exegesis, ethics, and religious philosophy. The exegetic rulings interpreted difficult passages of the bible, the Talmud, and the works of older authors, while the practical responsa comprised decisions as to the ritual, civil and marital law, communal relations, and the contemporary political affairs of the Jews.
  - The responsa of Solomon ben Adret fall into five parts. The first part (Bologna, 1539) contains 1,255 responsa; part two, titled "Sefer Toledot Olam" (Leghorn, 1654), contains 405; part three (ib. 1778) contains 445; part four (Salonica, 1803) contains 330; and part five (Leghorn, 1805) contains 298. Other responsa by him are included in the aforementioned "She'elot u-Teshuvot". A few examples of his decisions may be given. When asked concerning many discrepancies between the books of Chronicles and the other books of the Bible, he replied as follows (i., No. 12): "A change in phraseology without an alteration of meaning is not surprising. Even in the Pentateuch apparent discrepancies of this kind are found, so that one of the sons of Simeon is called Zohar in Gen. 46:10 and Ex. 6:15, and Zerah in Num. 26:13, but since both names signify 'magnificent', the double nomenclature is explained." In responsum No. 395 he describes his abolition of several superstitious customs, one of which was to kill an old cock, and to hang its head at the door on the occasion of the birth of a boy. Particularly noteworthy is responsum No. 548, in which he gives a decision regarding a marvelous child at Avila, who had originally been idiotic, but later frequently fell into trances during which he composed works whose contents he declared had been communicated to him by an angel.
- The chief representative of the German school in the thirteenth century was Rabbi Meir ben Baruch of Rothenburg. Many of his responsa have been preserved, the oldest collection being the "She'elot u-Teshubot" (Cremona, 1557) with 315 responsa, while another corpus, which contained 1,022 responsa, appeared under the same title at Prague in 1608. A collection of unedited responsa was issued at Lemberg in 1860, and in 1891 Moses Bloch published at Berlin a new corpus of unedited responsa of Meïr of Rothenburg under the title "Sefer Sha'are Teshubot Maharam". Maharam, famously, rules that a man may not hit his wife, "since, he may not hit another man, despite not owing him honour, whereas he owes her honour...". The special interest of Meïr's responsa is the picture they give of the condition of the German Jews of his time, and of their sufferings from the caprice of princes and from heavy taxation. The collections of the responsa of Meïr of Rothenburg contain also the rulings of other older and contemporary rabbis of the Franco-German school.

=== Fourteenth century ===
The principal representatives of the fourteenth century were Asher ben Jehiel (RoSH) and Isaac ben Sheshet Barfat.

- The responsa of the RoSH first appeared at Constantinople in 1517 under the title "She'elot u-Teshubot", while an enlarged edition was published at Venice in 1607. This collection of responsa is arranged according to 108 subjects, each of which has a special chapter, called "kelal", while at the head of every rubric stands a résumé of its contents and a numerical list of the responsa treating of each subject. This arrangement, however, was not the work of Asher himself, but was made probably by one of his pupils, possibly by his son Rabbi Judah. From the responsa of Rabbi Asher may be gleaned many curious customs of the Spanish communities. To a question addressed to him from Burgos, Asher responded (No. 68, 10) that according to Talmudic law no arrests could be made for debt, even in cases where the debtor had pledged his own person, although, on the other hand, he noted that it was the custom of the communities in Spain to imprison one who had failed to pay his quota of the royal tax until he should discharge his debt.
- The 518 responsa of Isaac ben Sheshet were published at Constantinople in 1546-47 as "She'elot u-Teshuvot". These responsa contain many disquisitions illustrative of the conditions of the times, including rulings on marriage and marital relations in the case of Jews who had been forcibly baptized, as well as other decisions relating to those who had been compelled to accept Christianity (e.g., Nos. 1, 4, 6, 11, 12, 43). Especially interesting are responsa that describe prevailing customs and regulations of the communities of the period, as in No. 158, which contains a noteworthy account of the seven days of mourning after the death of a kinsman.

== Acharonim ==
The period of the Achronim, or the Third Rabbinic Epoch includes response of Italian, Turkish, German, and Polish rabbis. Given the political climate and various persecutions the Jews were experiencing throughout this time period, the majority of these responsa were written in response to questions concerning legal matters. This section covers responsa written during fifteenth to the eighteenth century, and includes responsa of Italian, Turkish, German, and Polish rabbis. This period is the richest in the responsa literature. It would therefore be impossible to enumerate all the collections; this section presents a survey of the chief representatives of each century and country.

=== Characteristics ===
These rulings are different from those of the previous periods in the nature of the problems presented, in the method of treatment, and in the arrangement of subject-matter.

- Since the Acharonim saw themselves as no longer having the independence of the Rishonim, they sought to base their decisions on the older authorities. The field had already been thoroughly worked, and the respondent was consequently obliged to make a careful search for the question asked or one analogous to it, in order to provide an answer.
- Previously, the questions had covered many departments of knowledge, both sacred and profane, being concerned with ethical and philosophical problems as well as with halakhic and exegetic themes, so that there was scarcely a subject of human activity or thought on which the responsa might not expound. Among the Achronim, however, the responsa were restricted almost entirely to legal regulations. Since the pronouncement of judgment was regarded as a religious duty, and since in most countries the Jews were unwilling to submit to a non-Jewish court, legal questions formed a large part of the responsa.
- Previously, systematic sequence was almost entirely lacking. The responsa of the Achronim had as models the "Arba'ah Turim" of Jacob ben Asher and, after the sixteenth century, the Shulkhan Arukh of Joseph Caro, so that many of the responsa were arranged according to these two works, while among the later scholars this practice became the rule.
- Earlier responsa had been so lucid that the reader could easily follow them. Among the Achronim this changed completely, for pilpul, which had been in vogue since the mid-fifteenth century in Talmud study, forced its way into responsa literature as well. The responsa are remarkable for the hair-splitting dialectics that characterizes them, and often robs them of lucidity.

=== Fifteenth century ===
- The most important German respondents of the fifteenth century were Israel Isserlein and Israel Bruna.
  - The collection of the responsa of Israel Isserlein, "Terumat ha-Deshen", comprises 354 decisions, which are important as describing many characteristic features of the time. Several of them (Nos. 341-346) discuss the apportionment of the taxes and the assessments, while others are concerned with the attitude to be observed toward a repentant apostate (No. 198). Particularly interesting is the responsum (No. 197) devoted to the problem whether Jews might so disguise themselves as to escape recognition in countries where they were absolutely forbidden to reside. He was lenient in cases of widows who lacked a divorce document (agunah).
  - The responsa of Israel Bruna, titled "She'elot u-Teshuvot", likewise contain many interesting allusions to contemporary conditions, as in the case of No. 71, which discusses the problem whether the Jews might attend races.
- In Italy the chief representatives of the fifteenth century were Joseph Colon and Judah Minz.
- Especially important in the responsal literature of this century were the Turkish rabbis, among whom the chief were Jacob Berab, Levi ben Chabib, Elijah Mizrachi, and Moses Alashkar. The responsa of Moses Alashkar (printed at Sabbionetta in 1554) discuss whether a converted Jew may be compelled by the provincial court to give his Jewish wife a bill of divorce according to Jewish procedure (No. 75, pp. 136b-137a), and the question of the covering of the head and the concealment of the hair in the case of a married woman (No. 35, pp. 94 et seq.)

=== Sixteenth century ===
The chief Polish representatives of the sixteenth century were Moses Isserles, Solomon Luria, and Meir Lublin; the responsa of these scholars throw a flood of light on the condition of the Jews of the period, who evidently took high rank in Poland and were not unfamiliar with military arts, since they offered their services to the duke or to the prince on the outbreak of a war (comp. responsum. No. 43 of Meir Lublin).

The chief Turkish respondents of this period were Joseph Caro, Joseph ibn Leb, Samuel of Modena, and David abi Zimra ("Radbaz"). The responsa of Radbaz, in particular, are characterized by lucidity and strict logic. One noteworthy example discusses whether a Jew may abjure his religion and accept Islam when threatened with death, considering the question in detail, and determines the cases in which a Jew may thus save his life and the contingencies in which he should rather choose death.

The only important Italian respondent of the sixteenth century was Menahem Azariah da Fano, whose responsa were edited at Dyhernfurth in 1788.

=== Seventeenth century ===
In the seventeenth century rabbis of various countries prepared responsa, but the Polish scholars were in the great majority.

- The chief German representative of responsal literature was Jair Hayyim Bacharach.
- Among the Italian respondents the most important was Samuel Aboab, whose decisions appeared at Venice in 1702 under the title "Debar Shemu'el".
- Of the Turkish authorities the most prominent were Joseph ben Moses di Trani (MaHaRIT) and Jacob Alfandari, whose responsa, titled "Muẓẓal me-Esh", were published at Constantinople in 1718.
- The principal Polish rabbis of the seventeenth century who wrote responsa were Aaron Samuel Kaidanover and Menahem Mendel Krochmal. The decisions of the former, which were published at Frankfort-on-the-Main in 1683 under the title "Emunat Shemu'el", afford a glimpse of the plight of the German Jews of the time. The responsa of Menahem Mendel Krochmal appeared posthumously; the most noteworthy of his rulings is one (No. 2) in which he decided in favor of universal suffrage in the community, making no distinction between rich and poor, taxed and untaxed, learned and ignorant, but giving all an equal share in the choice of the rabbi, the dayan, and the president.

=== Eighteenth century ===
In the eighteenth century the rabbis of various countries contributed to responsa literature, but the most important were still the Polish scholars.

- The chief representative of Germany was Jacob Emden, whose responsa form the collection titled "She'elot Ya'abetz".
- Among the many noteworthy Polish scholars are Meir Eisenstadt and Ezekiel Landau.
  - The Responsa of Meir Eisenstadt, titled "Panim Me'irot" contains one "particularly interesting" ruling, in which he stigmatizes as presumptuous arrogance the practice of ostentatiously wearing white garments in the fashion of the Kabbalists, while the general custom was to wear black clothing.
  - The collection of responsa by Ezekiel Landau, known as "Noda' bi-Yehudah", was esteemed by rabbis and scholars, as distinguished both for its logical discussion and for its independence with regard to the rulings of later authorities as contrasted with its adherence to the writings of earlier scholars.

== Nineteenth century to early twentieth century ==
In this period, many responsa deal with problems taken from modern experience. Responsa have been inspired or necessitated by economic growth, social movements, and advances in technology, which wrought sweeping changes in the lives and living conditions of the Jews in different countries, as well as within Judaic streams; e.g., those of Reform Judaism and Zionism.

The movements for the reform of Judaism evoked many responsa in reply to questions concerning the location of the bimah, organ accompaniments, the covering of the head in the synagogue, the seating of men and women together, and prayers in the vernacular.

Jewish settlement in Palestine had occasioned many responsa on questions connected with agriculture and horticulture in the Holy Land, including the problems of the cessation of all labor in the fields during the Sabbatical year and the use of etrogs from Israel.

Following are representative examples:

- Moses Sofer discussed whether the "bimah" might be removed from the center and placed near the Ark, as is now the case in all Reform and even in many Orthodox synagogues, but was then interdicted as an innovation. In another responsum he debated whether a Jewish sculptor was permitted by his religion to carve human figures.
- Joseph Saul Nathanson discussed the problem of the transfer of a corpse from one place of burial to another. In another responsum he replied in the affirmative to a question sent him from New York City asking whether a Protestant church might be changed into a synagogue. He was one of the first to permit the use of machinery in baking Matzah.
- Isaac Schmelkes passed judgment on the question of civil marriage, which the laws of Hungary permitted between Jews and non-Jews, and he debated also whether electric lights may be used for Hanukkah, and whether the telephone or the phonograph may be used on the Sabbath.

In addition to the collections of responsa already mentioned, important examples of responsa literature in the nineteenth century include: the "Ḥesed le-Abraham" of Abraham Te'omim, the "Ketab Sofer" of Abraham Samuel Benjamin Sofer, and the "Be'er Yiẓḥaḳ" of Isaac Elhanan Spektor.

== Twentieth century–present ==
While many of the responsa throughout history have been written down and can be found in various books or anthologies, a lot of responsa today can be found on online databases such as The Global Jewish Database (The Responsa Project) at Bar-Ilan University. The Schechter Institute's website also has six volumes of Conservative responsa written by the Rabbinical Assembly.

=== Responsa of Orthodox Judaism ===
In contemporary Orthodox Judaism, responsa remain a primary channel whereby halakhic decisions and policies are formulated and communicated. Notable collections of Responsa published in the 20th Century include those by Moshe Feinstein, Ovadia Yosef, Eliezer Waldenberg, Yechiel Yaakov Weinberg and Meir Arik.

Contemporary responsa deal with both traditional questions and phenomena associated with modern social, religious, medical and technological developments. For example, Israeli astronaut Ilan Ramon noted that, while orbiting the Earth, the Space Shuttle experienced a day/night cycle approximately every ninety minutes. Thus, Ramon asked whether he should keep the Sabbath according to Earth time, or mark it once every seven day/night cycles (ten and a half hours). And if according to Earth time, then what location on Earth should this be based upon? The rabbis concluded that he was to celebrate the Sabbath in accordance with Earth time, based on the place of his departure, Cape Canaveral.

=== Conservative responsa ===
Conservative Judaism holds that Orthodoxy has deviated from historical Judaism through excessive concern with recent codifications of Jewish law. Conservative rabbis make a conscious effort to use historical sources to determine what kind of changes occurred, how and why they occurred, and in what historical context. With this information they believe that can better understand a proper way for rabbis to interpret and apply Jewish law to our conditions today. Like Orthodoxy, there is no one legal body that speaks for all Jews in their religious community.

When defined narrowly as the Conservative movement, Conservative Judaism has two law committees: In the USA there is the Committee on Jewish Law and Standards of the Rabbinical Assembly. The CJLS is the body that sets halakhic policy. There are 25 voting members on the committee who determine whether or not to enact a specific responsa. The responsa are written after a member of the Rabbinic Assembly or the Conservative movement in general poses a question about Halakha. A responsa is deemed approved when at least 6 member of the committee vote to approve it. Despite the fact that CJLS makes decisions about the rulings of responsa, which stands as the decisions for the entirety of the Conservative Movement, individual rabbis can still make their own decision about how to rule on specific circumstances within their communities. In the State of Israel there is the Vaad Halakhah of the local branch, the Masorti movement.

== See also ==
- Halakha
- Rabbi
- Oral Torah
- Posek
