= Issur Veheter Ha'aruch =

Medieval work of Jewish law

Issur v'Heter Ha'aroch (known in short as O"H or Aroch) is a fifteenth-century book on the laws of prohibition and permission, particularly dietary laws. The author wrote the book according to teachings he received from R. Shalom b. Isaac of Wiener Neustadt., the teacher of the Yaakov ben Moshe Levi Moelin (Maharil).

There are two versions of the book. The manuscript version of the book differs from the printed version, which was apparently printed based on a different manuscript. Several times, rulings from the book were cited in the words of the Rema that are not found in the printed version, and sometimes they are found but with a different meaning. The Rema himself noted the difference between the two versions of the book.

== Author ==
The identity of the book's author is unknown, but it was composed by one of the early sages of Ashkenaz (German Jewry) in the generation of Rabbi Israel Isserlein, the author of the book Terumat HaDeshen. There are several hypotheses regarding the author of the book. Some believe that his name is Rabbi Yonah Ashkenazi.

== Importance ==
The book serves as a basic and significant source in the ruling of halakha in matters of prohibition and permission. It is one of the primary sources for the rulings of the Rema in the Yoreh Deah section, and the fact that Rabbi Joseph Karo did not use the book was one of the factors that motivated the Moses Isserles to compose the book Darkei Moshe. Even in later generations, the book continued to serve as an important source for halakhic rulings, and thus, for example, Rabbi Yonatan Eybeschütz wrote in his introduction to the book Kreiti Upleiti:

"And especially Issur v'Heter Ha'aroch, from whose mouth we literally live in the instruction of prohibition and permission." (Kreiti Upleiti 84:8)
