= Synagogue Ljubljana =

Synagogue in Ljubljana, Slovenia

Ljubljana Synagogue
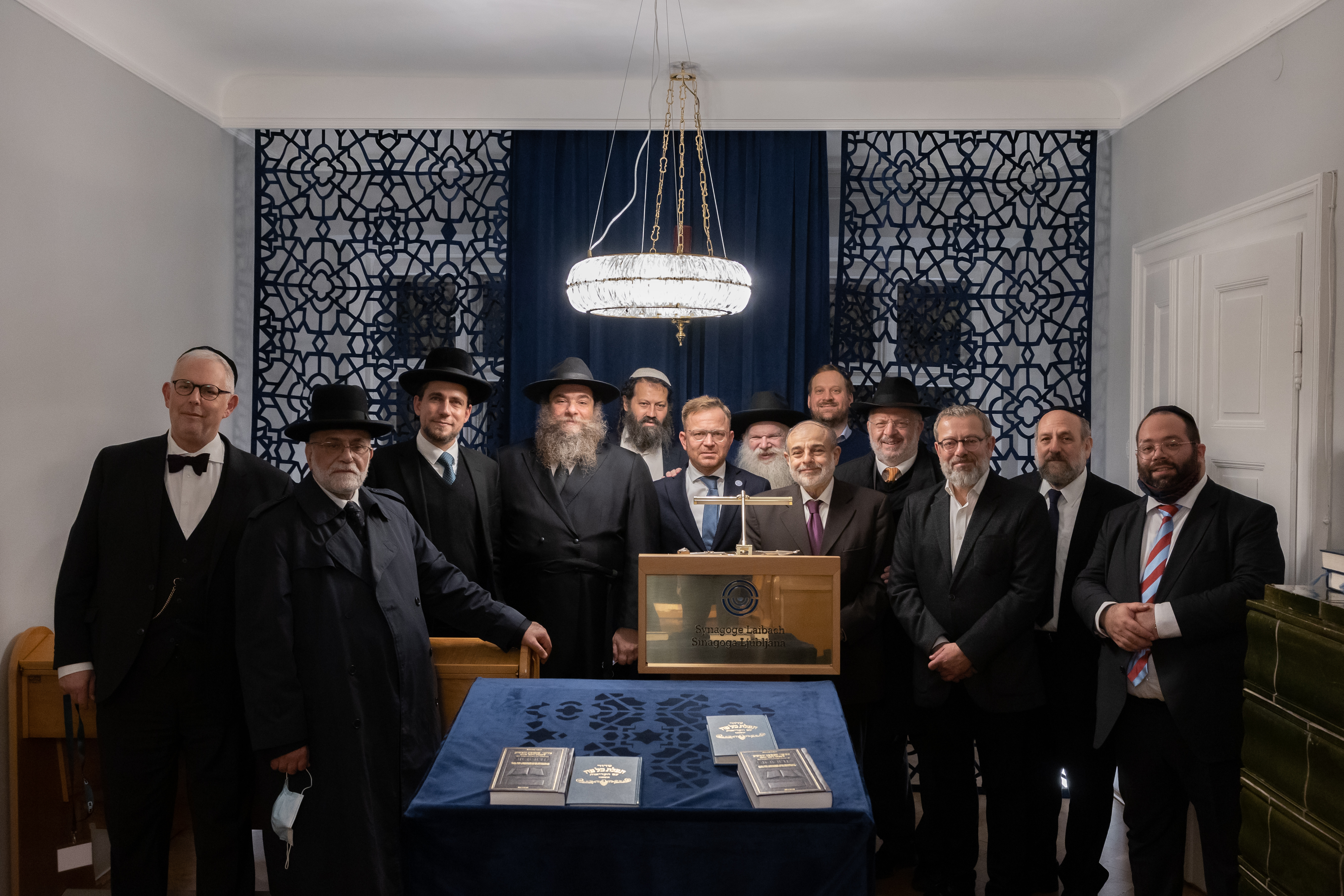
- Hachnassat Sefer Thora

Religion
- Affiliation: Orthodox Judaism
- Ecclesiastical or organizational status: Synagogue
- Status: Active

Location
- Location: Trubarjeva cesta 10, Ljubljana
- Country: Slovenia

Architecture
- Established: 2021 (as a congregation)
- Completed: 2021
- Capacity: 70 worshipers

Website
- sinagoga.si/en

The Ljubljana Synagogue is an Orthodox Jewish congregation and synagogue, located in a residential building in the center of Ljubljana, Slovenia. Established by the Federation of the Jewish Communities of Graz and Ljubljana in 2021, the synagogue is the only active Jewish place of worship in Slovenia. Prior to its establishment, the congregation was dependent on makeshift arrangements.

== History ==
On August 2, 2021, the Jewish Community of Graz and the Jewish Community of Slovenia, led by Elie Rosen, President of the Jewish Community of Graz, and Igor Vojtic, Vice President of the Jewish Community of Slovenia, announced the establishment of the Federation of Jewish Communities of Graz and Ljubljana. The transnational association of Jewish communities was established with the goal to reinforce and develop community life of both entities.

The opening ceremony of the synagogue of Ljubljana which is run under traditional (orthodox) rite was held on 9 November 2021 - the memorial day of the November-pogroms from 1938 – in attendance of the President of the Republic of Slovenia Borut Pahor, the Roman Catholic Archbishop msg. Stanislav Zore, Mufti of the Islamic Community in the Republic of Slovenia Nevzet Porić'as well as high ranking representatives from politics, diplomacy and society. The Republic of Austria was represented by the Ambassador of Austria to Slovenia, Elisabeth Ellison-Kramer.

== Hachnasat Sefer Torah ==
Just before the opening of the synagogue, a delegation of The Conference of European Rabbis with Rabbis from Germany, Great Britain, France, Austria, Spain, Switzerland, Sweden and Poland attended the ceremonial introduction of the Torah scroll into the synagogue on November 3, 2021. The ceremony at the Ljubljana Synagogue took place in the presence of the Chief Rabbi of Poland, Michael Joseph Schudrich, together with the Chief Rabbi for Slovenia, Ariel Haddad, the Rabbi for the Province of Styria, Schlomo Hofmeister, and the President of the Graz Jewish Community and Synagogue Ljubljana, Elie Rosen. The Synagogue Ljubljana is the only Jewish institution of the Jewish community in the territory of the Republic of Slovenia, recognized by the Conference of European Rabbis.

== The interior ==
The Synagogue Ljubljana follows Orthodox prayer ritual: the prayer space consists of a space for men with about 45 seats and a women's section with a capacity of about 25 seats. In addition to the central rooms, the synagogue is complemented by several adjoining rooms, including a common parlour, a kiddush room and an administrative room. The wooden benches in the synagogue were made by the Israeli kibbutz Lavi, the tora shrine is the work of the Austrian-Styrian company Teammöbel from Hartberg, which also equipped the synagogue in Baden near Vienna.

One of the central features in the Synagogue Ljubljana is the blue curtain in front of the Torah shrine, designed by young Slovene fashion designer Matic Veler, who graduated from the Royal College of Art in London, UK. The curtain pattern originates from typical Jewish symbolism, tailored to the needs of the prayer room, and is based on the idea of transmitting light through a laser-cut pattern, making the reflection of the shadow form a mystical and moving environment. The placement of Veler's pieces in spaces such as galleries, museums and now a synagogue is in line with his broader design philosophy.

== See also ==
- History of the Jews in Slovenia
- Jewish Cultural Center (Ljubljana)
