= Maribor Synagogue =

Former synagogue and current museum in Maribor, Slovenia

- Slovene: Sinagoga Maribor
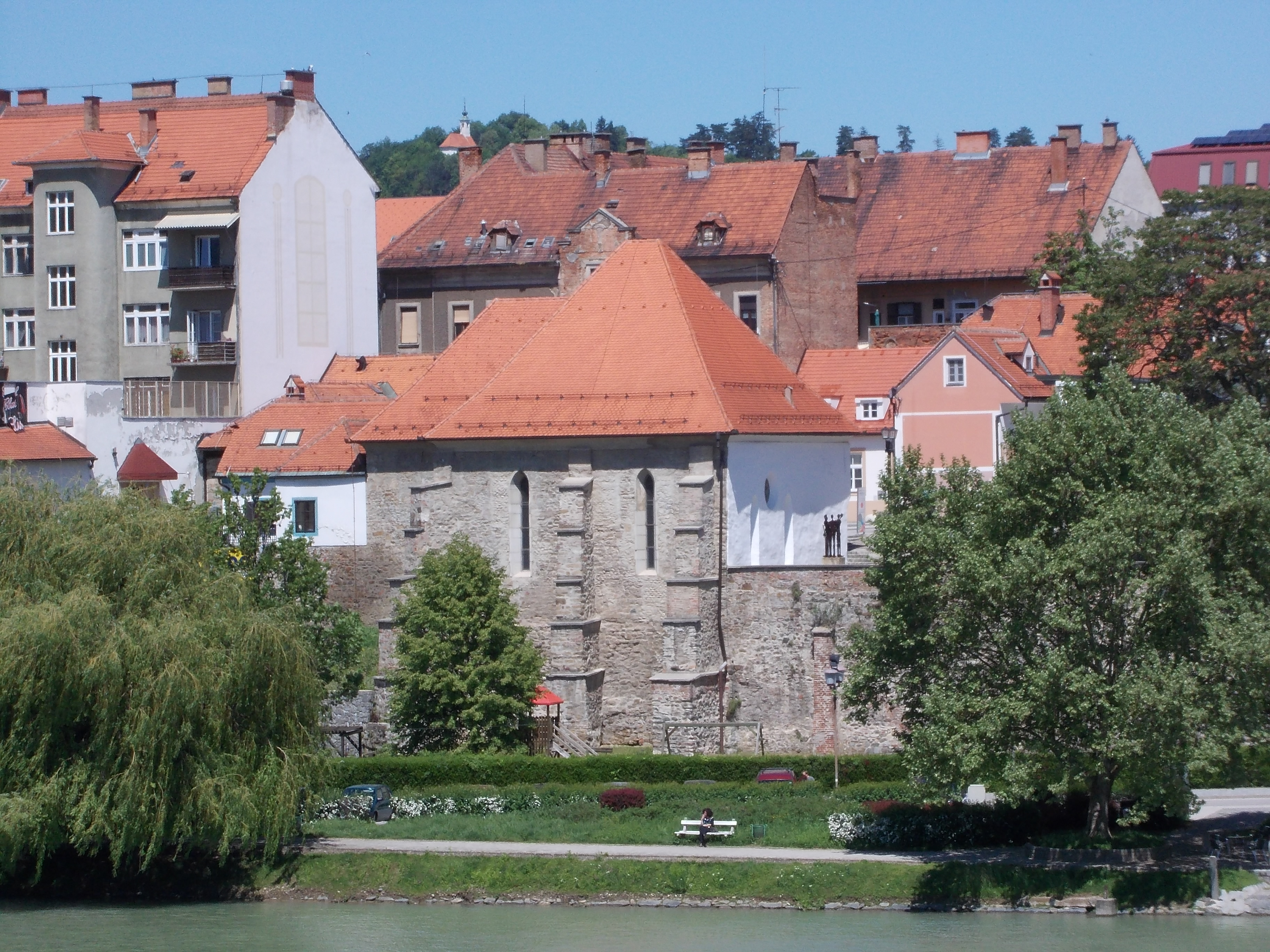
- The former synagogue in 2013

- Location of the former synagogue in Slovenia

Religion
- Affiliation: Orthodox Judaism (former)
- Rite: Nusach Ashkenaz
- Ecclesiastical or organizational status: Synagogue (c. 1350s–1497); Church (1501–1785); Jewish museum (since 2001)
- Status: Closed (as a synagogue); Repurposed

Location
- Location: Židovska ulica, Maribor
- Country: Slovenia
- Interactive map of Maribor Synagogue
- Coordinates: 46°33′24″N 15°38′52″E

Architecture
- Type: Synagogue architecture
- Style: Gothic (Medieval)
- Completed: c. 1350s

Website
- sinagogamaribor.si

Maribor Synagogue (Slovene: Sinagoga Maribor) is a former Orthodox Jewish congregation and synagogue, located in what was the center of the medieval Maribor ghetto Židovska ulica ("Jewish Street"), in the city of Maribor, Slovenia. The former congregation was established in the 14th century and worshiped in the Ashkenazi rite.

The synagogue building was completed in the late 14th century, the building served as a synagogue until 1497; as a church from 1501 until 1785; and as a Jewish history museum, called the Center of Jewish Cultural Heritage Synagogue Maribor, since 2001. It is one of the oldest preserved synagogues in Europe, and one of only two left in Slovenia; the other being the Lendava Synagogue. It once functioned as the centre of the medieval Jewish community in Maribor, among the most prominent in the Eastern Alps-area.

== History ==
First mentioned in 1354, the synagogue is thought to have been built sometime in the late 13th century. Located next to the city walls, it was part of a complex that included a Jewish cemetery, rabbinical residence, and Talmudic school. A fortified tower nearby - part of the walls themselves - was known as the Židovski stolp ("Jewish Tower"), while a building housing ritual baths stood outside the walls on the Drava riverbank.

At points throughout its history, the synagogue served as a temporary seat of the Supreme Rabbinate of Styria, Carinthia and Krain. Around 1450, rabbi Israel Isserlein, considered to be one of the most influential Ashkenazic Talmud authorities of his time in all of Central-East Europe, flourished in this city and this very synagogue.

In 1497, the Jews of Maribor were expelled, scattering all over Europe, especially Italy. After the expulsion, the synagogue was in 1501 turned into a Catholic church, the Church of All Saints (Slovene: Cerkev Vseh Svetnikov). The former rabbi's residence to the west of the main building became a curate office, while another, smaller building on the eastern side housed the sexton.

In 1785, during the anticlerical reforms of Joseph II, the church was confiscated, deconsecrated, and converted into a military warehouse. It served in this capacity until 1811, when it was sold to private owners for use as a merchant storage, a wine cellar, a brush factory, an art studio, and an apartment house, which it remained until the 1980s.

Following several years of renovations, taking place from 1992 until 2000, including a reconstruction of the late Gothic sanctuary, the building opened in 2001 as a museum and cultural-exhibition venue devoted to the history of the Jewish community of Maribor, and of Slovenia. The site was initially administered by the Regional Museum of Maribor. Since 2011 it is an independent public institution under the name of Center of Jewish Cultural Heritage Synagogue Maribor. The former synagogue was labeled a Cultural monument of State significance in Slovenia in 2015.

== See also ==
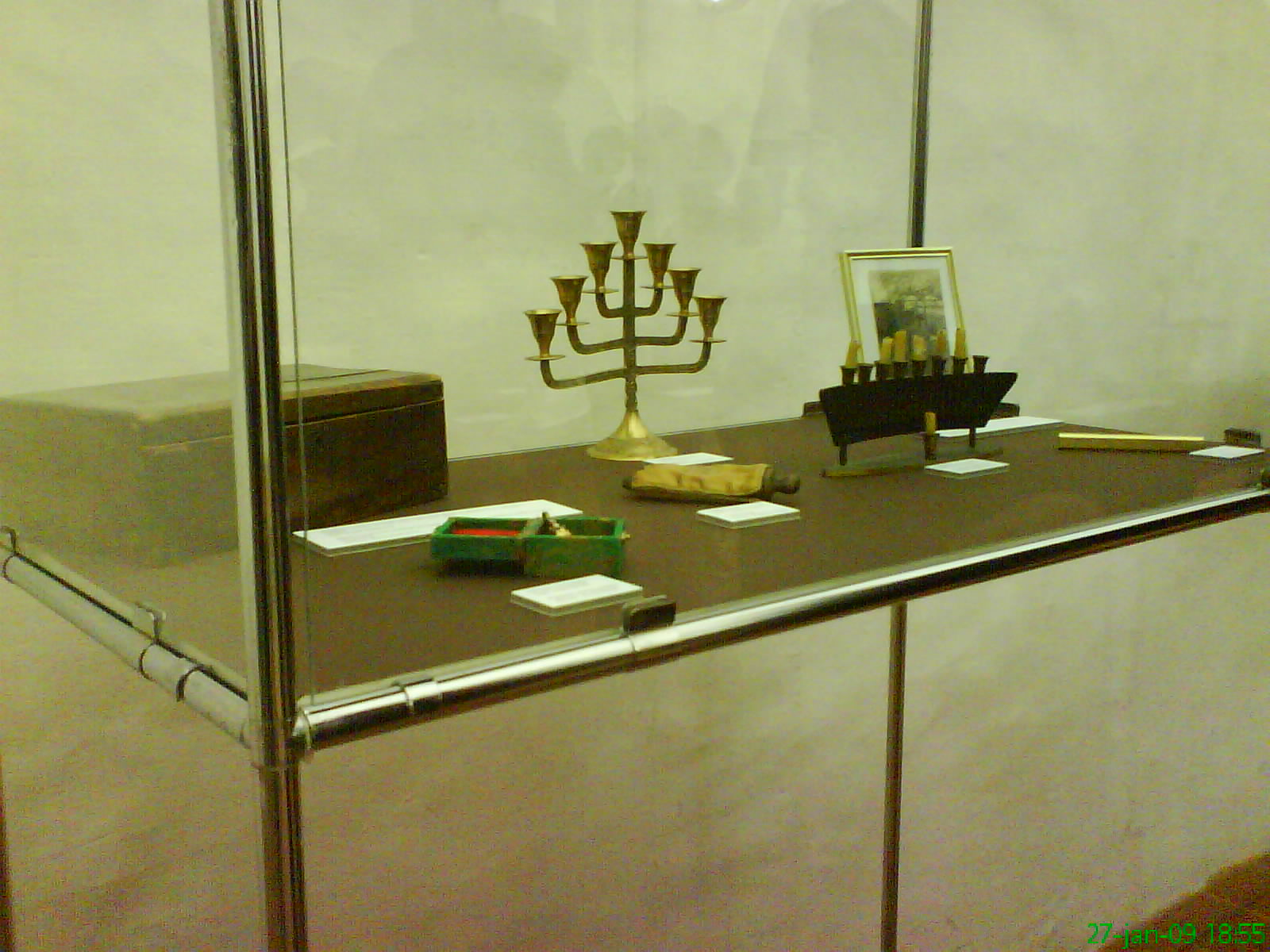
Exhibit case, interior of synagogue

- History of the Jews in Slovenia
