= History of the Jews in Slovenia =

The location of Slovenia (dark green) in Europe

The history of the Jews in Slovenia and areas connected with it goes back to the times of Ancient Rome. In 2011, the small Slovenian Jewish community (Slovene: Judovska skupnost Slovenije) was estimated at 100 to 130 members, of whom around 130 are officially registered, most of whom live in the capital, Ljubljana.

== History of the community ==
=== Ancient community ===
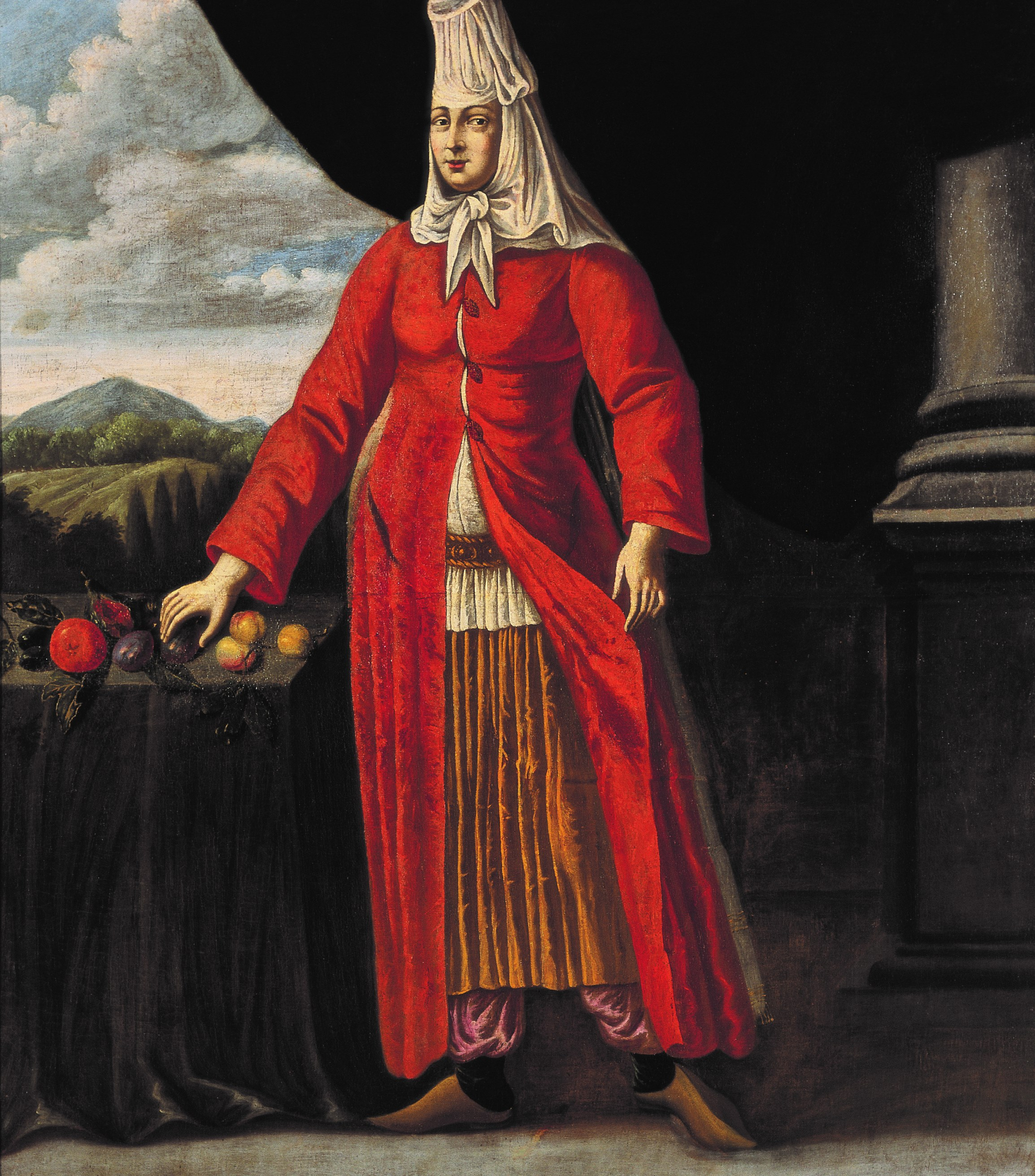
Painting of a Jewish woman, c. 1682. In the collection of the Ptuj Ormož Regional Museum

The ancient Jewish community of Slovenia predated the 6th-century Slavic settlement of the Eastern Alps, when the Slavic ancestors of the present-day Slovenes entered their current territory. The first Jews arrived in what is now Slovenia in Roman times, with archaeological evidence of Jews found in Maribor and in the village of Škocjan in Lower Carniola. In Škocjan, an engraved menorah dating from the 5th century AD was found in a graveyard.

In the 12th century, Jews arrived in the Slovene lands fleeing poverty in Italy and central Europe. Even though they were forced to live in ghettos, many Jews prospered. Relations between Jews and the local Christian population were generally peaceful. In Maribor, Jews were successful bankers, winegrowers, and millers. Several "Jewish courts" (Judenhof) existed in Styria, settling disputes between Jews and Christians. Israel Isserlein, who authored several essays on medieval Jewish life in Lower Styria, was the most important rabbi at the time, having lived in Maribor. In 1397, Jewish ghettos in Radgona and Ptuj were set ablaze by anonymous anti-Jewish assailants.

The first synagogue in Ljubljana was mentioned in 1213. Issued with a Privilegium, Jews were able to settle an area of Ljubljana located on the left bank of the Ljubljanica River. The streets Židovska ulica (Jewish Street) and Židovska steza (Jewish Lane), which now occupy the area, are still reminiscent of that period.

==== The expulsion of the Jews ====
The wealth of the Jews bred resentment among the Inner Austrian nobility and the burghers, with many refusing to repay Jewish money-lenders, and local merchants considered Jews to be competitors. The antisemitism of the Catholic Church also played an important role in creating animosity against the Jews, In 1494 and 1495 the assemblies of Styria and Carinthia offered Austrian Emperor Maximilian a bounty for the expulsion of the Jews from both provinces.

Maximilian granted their request, citing as reasons for the expulsion the Jewish pollution of the Christian sacrament, the ritual killings of Christian children, and the defrauding of debtors. The expulsions started immediately, with the last Jews expelled by 1718. The Jews were expelled from Maribor in 1496. Following separate demands by the citizens of Ljubljana for the expulsion of the Jews, Jews were expelled from Ljubljana in 1515. After the expulsion of the Jewish community, the Maribor Synagogue was turned into a church.

=== The modern era ===
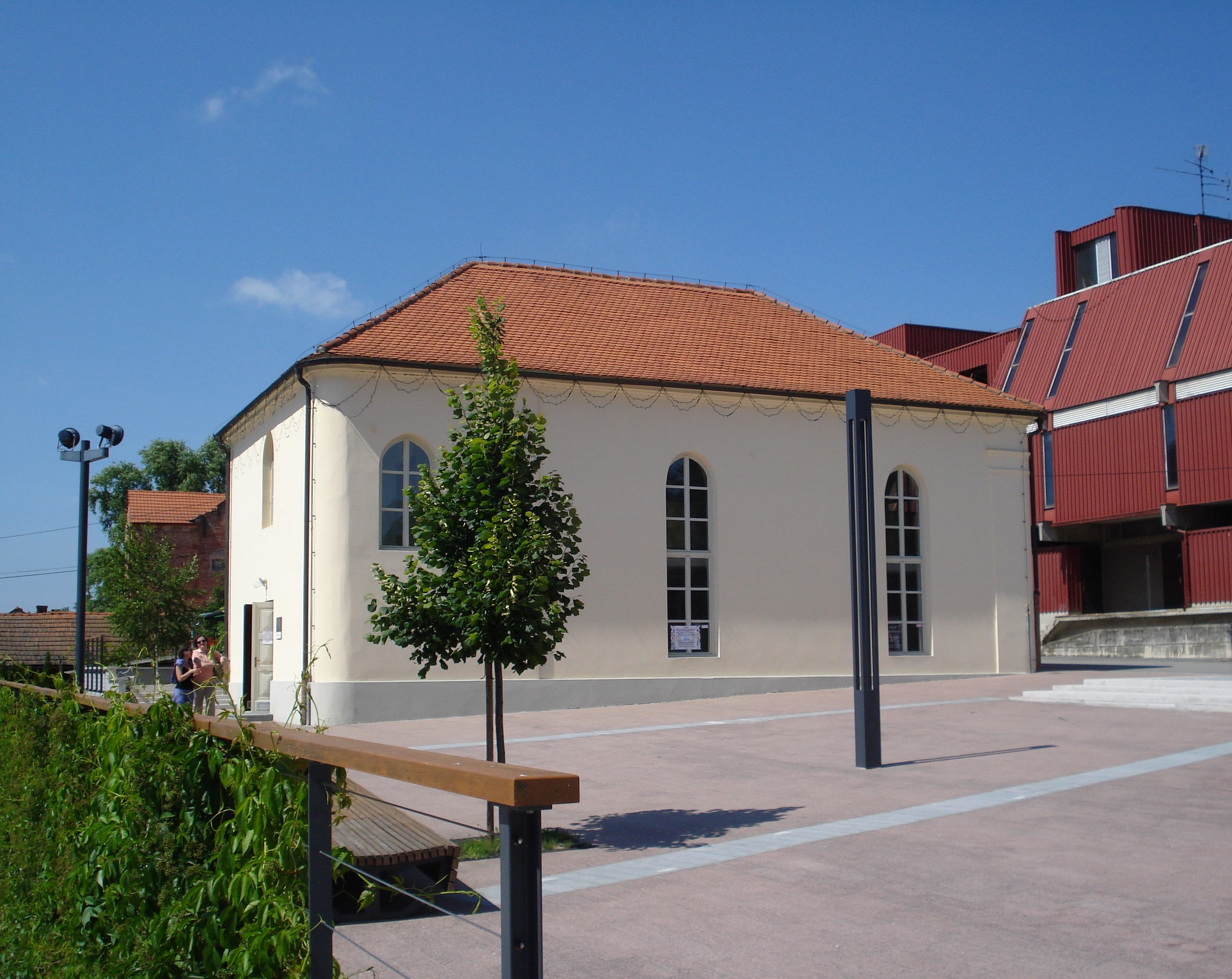
The building of the former Lendava Synagogue

In 1709, the Holy Roman Emperor Charles VI, ruler of the Habsburg monarchy, issued a decree allowing Jews to return to Inner Austria. Nevertheless, Jews in that time settled almost exclusively in the commercial city of Trieste and, to a much smaller extent, in the town of Gorizia (both now part of Italy). The decree was overturned in 1817 by Francis I, and Jews were granted full civil and political right only with the Austrian constitution of 1867. Nevertheless, the Slovene Lands remained virtually without a consistent Jewish population, with the exception of Gorizia, Trieste, the region of Prekmurje, and some smaller towns in the western part of the County of Gorizia and Gradisca (Gradisca, Cervignano), which were inhabited mostly by a Friulian-speaking population.

According to the census of 1910, only 146 Jews lived in the territory of present-day Slovenia, excluding the Prekmurje region. Yet despite this, as elsewhere in Austria-Hungary, antisemitism started to intensify also in Slovenia, from the mid-19th century onward. propagated by prominent Slovene Catholic leaders, such as Bishop Anton Mahnič and Janez Evangelist Krek. The former called for a war against Judaism and the latter sought to persuade believers that the Jews were transmitters of the most harmful influences.

In 1918, in the chaotic transition between Austria-Hungary and the new Kingdom of Serbs, Croats and Slovenes, riots broke out against Jews and Hungarians in many places in Prekmurje. Soldiers returning from the front and locals looted Jewish and Hungarian shops. On November 4, 1918, in Beltinci, locals looted Jewish homes and shops, tortured Jews, and set fire to the synagogue. After the pogrom, the once powerful Beltinci Orthodox Jewish community, numbering 150 in the mid-19th century, disappeared. In 1937 the local authorities demolished the Beltinci synagogue

Rampant anti-Semitism was among the reasons why few Jews decided to settle in the area, and the overall Jewish population remained at a very low level. In the 1920s, after the formation of the Kingdom of Serbs, Croats and Slovenes (Yugoslavia), the local Jewish community merged with the Jewish community of Zagreb, Croatia.

According to the 1931 census, there were about 900 Jews in the Drava Banovina, mostly concentrated in Prekmurje, which was part of the Kingdom of Hungary prior to 1919. This was the reason why in the mid-1930s Murska Sobota became the seat of the Jewish Community of Slovenia. During that period, the Jewish population was reinvigorated by many immigrants fleeing from neighbouring Austria and Nazi Germany to a more tolerant Kingdom of Yugoslavia.

Nevertheless, in the prewar period the Slovene Roman Catholic Church and its affiliated largest political party, the Slovenian People's Party, engaged in antisemitism, with Catholic papers writing about "Jews" as "a disaster for our countryside", "Jews" as "fraudsters" and "traitors to Christ", while the main Slovene Catholic daily, Slovenec, informed local Jews that their "road out of Yugoslavia ... was open". and that from Slovenia "we export such goods [I.e. Jews] without compensation". While interior minister in the Yugoslav government, the leading Slovene politician and former Catholic priest, Anton Korošec, declared "all Jews, Communists, and Freemasons as traitors, conspirators, and enemies of the State". Then in 1940 Korošec introduced two antisemitic laws in Yugoslavia, to ban Jews from the food industry and restrict the number of Jewish students in high schools and universities Slovene Jews were severely affected, as Sharika Horvat noted in her testimony for the Shoah Foundation, "everything fell apart .... under the Korošec government."

According to official Yugoslav data, the number of self-declared Jews (according to religion, not to ancestry) in Yugoslav Slovenia rose to 1,533 by 1939. In that year, there were 288 declared Jews in Maribor, 273 in Ljubljana, 270 in Murska Sobota, 210 in Lendava and 66 in Celje. The other 400 Jews lived scattered around the country, with a quarter of them living in the Prekmurje region. Prior to World War Two, there were two active synagogues in Slovenia, one in Murska Sobota and one in Lendava. The overall number of Jews prior to the Axis invasion of Yugoslavia in April 1941 is estimated to have been around 2,500, including baptised Jews and refugees from Austria and Germany.

=== The Holocaust ===
The Jewish community, very small even before World War II and the Shoah, was further reduced by the Nazis occupation between 1941 and 1945; the Jews in northern and eastern Slovenia (the Slovenian Styria, Upper Carniola, Slovenian Carinthia, and Posavje), which was annexed to the Third Reich, were deported to concentration camps as early as in the late spring of 1941. Very few survived. In Ljubljana and in Lower Carniola, which came under Italian occupation, the Jews were relatively safe until September 1943, when most of the zone was occupied by the Nazi German forces. In late 1943, most of them were deported to concentration camps, although some managed to escape, especially by fleeing to the zones freed by the partisan resistance.

In Ljubljana, 32 Jews were able to hide until September 1944, when they were betrayed and arrested in raids by the collaborationist Slovene Home Guard police and handed over to the Nazis, who then sent them to Auschwitz, where most were exterminated. The Slovene Home Guard greatly intensified the antisemitism already present in prewar Slovene Catholic circles, engaging in vicious antisemitic propaganda. Thus the Slovene Home Guard leader, Leon Rupnik, attacked Jews in virtually all his public speeches, In 1944, the Home Guard newspaper wrote: "Judaism wants to enslave the whole world. It can enslave it if it also economically destroys all the nations. That is why it drove nations into war to destroy themselves and thereby benefit the Jews. Communism is the most loyal executor of Jewish orders, along with liberal democracy. Both ideas were created by Jews for non-Jewish peoples. The Slovenian nation also wants to bring Judaism to its knees, along with its moral decay and impoverishment." The influential Catholic priest, Lambert Ehrlich, who advocated collaboration with the Italian Fascist authorities, campaigned against "Jewish Satanism," which he maintained was trying to get its hands on other peoples’ national treasures.

The Jews of Prekmurje, where the majority of Slovenian Jewry lived prior to World War Two, suffered the same fate as the Jews of Hungary. Following the German occupation of Hungary, almost the entire Jewish population of the Prekmurje region was deported to Auschwitz. Very few survived. All together it is estimated that of the 1,500 Jews in Slovenia in 1939, only 200 managed to survive, meaning 87% were exterminated by the Nazis, among the highest rates in Europe.

Some Slovene Jews managed to save themselves by joining the partisans. Unlike the Polish resistance, which did not allow Jews in their ranks, the Yugoslav partisans welcomed Jews. 3,254 Jews in former Yugoslavia survived by joining the partisans, more than one-fifth of all survivors. After the war 10 Jewish partisans were named Yugoslav national heroes. For assisting Jews during the Holocaust, 15 Slovenes have been named Righteous Among the Nations, by Yad Vashem.

=== Post-war community ===
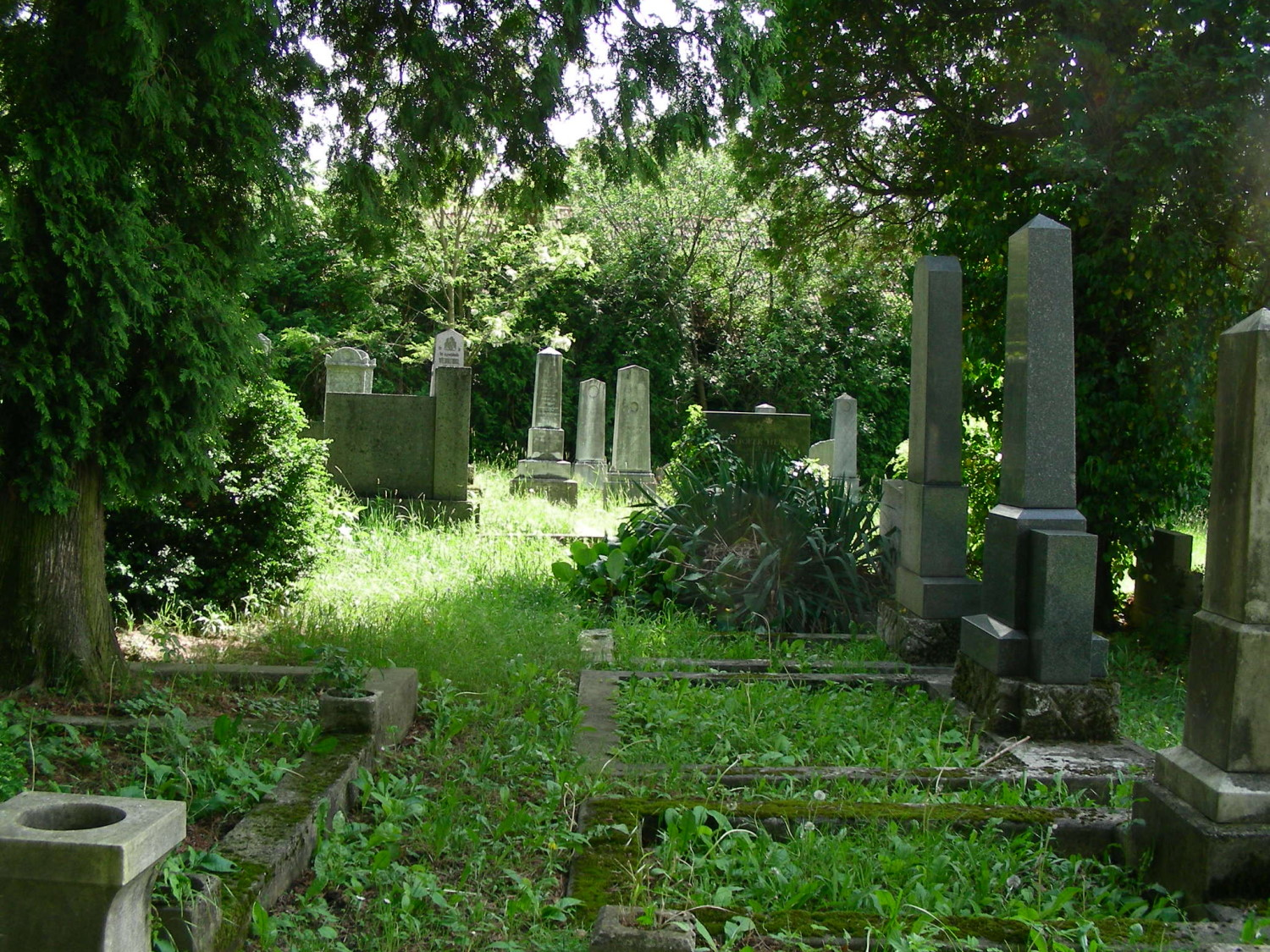
Jewish cemetery in Lendava, in the eastern Slovenian Prekmurje region

Under Communism in Yugoslavia, the Jewish community in Socialist Republic of Slovenia numbered fewer than 100 members. The Federation of Jewish Communities was reestablished and upon the establishment of the State of Israel (1948), the Federation sought and received permission from the Yugoslav authorities to organize Jewish emigration to Israel. 8,000 Yugoslav Jews, among them Slovene Jews, who were all allowed to take their property with them, left for Israel. In 1953, the synagogue of Murska Sobota, the only remaining after the Shoah, which the handful of Jewish survivors were unable to maintain and therefore sold in 1949 to the city, was demolished by the local Communist authorities to make way for new apartments. Many Jews were expelled from Yugoslavia as "ethnic Germans", and most of Jewish property was confiscated.

In Ljubljana, Jewish properties were confiscated as "enemy property" by the City Confiscation Committee (Slovene: Mestna zaplembena komisija) and turned over to the communist elite. These properties included the Ebenspanger Mansion (used by Boris Kidrič), the Mergenthaler Mansion (used by the OZNA, or secret police), and the Pollak mansion (used by Edvard Kocbek). In addition, the Moskovič mansion was sold under questionable circumstances and is now used by the Social Democrats, the successor of the Communist Party of Slovenia.

The Judovska občina v Ljubljani (Jewish Community of Ljubljana) was officially reformed following World War II. Its first president was Artur Kon, followed by Aleksandar Švarc, and by Roza Fertig-Švarc in 1988. In 1969, it numbered only 84 members and its membership was declining due to emigration and age.

In the 1960s and 1970s, there was a revival of Jewish themes in Slovenian literature, almost exclusively by women authors. Berta Bojetu was the most renowned Jewish author who wrote in Slovene. Others included Miriam Steiner and Zlata Medic-Vokač.

== After 1990 ==
In the last Yugoslav census in 1991, 199 Slovenes declared themselves of the Jewish religion, and in the 2011 census, the number was 99. The Jewish community today is estimated at only 100 members. The community consists of people of Ashkenazi and Sephardi descent. In 1999, the first Chief Rabbi for Slovenia was appointed since 1941. Before that, religious services were provided with help from the Jewish community of Zagreb. The present chief rabbi for Slovenia, Ariel Haddad, resides in Trieste and is a member of the Lubavitcher Hassidic school. The current president of the Jewish Community of Slovenia is Andrej Kožar Beck.

Since the year 2000, there has been a noticeable revival of Jewish culture in Slovenia. In 2003, a synagogue was opened in Ljubljana. In 2008, the Association Isserlein was founded to promote the legacy of Jewish culture in Slovenia. It has organized several public events that have received positive responses from the media, such as the public lighting of the hanukiah in Ljubljana in 2009. There has also been a growing public interest in the historical legacy of Jews of Slovenia. In 2008, the complex of the Jewish Cemetery in Rožna Dolina near Nova Gorica was restored due to the efforts of the local Social Democratic Party politicians, pressure from the neighboring Jewish Community of Gorizia, and the American Embassy in Slovenia. In January 2010, the first monument to the victims of the Shoah in Slovenia was unveiled in Murska Sobota.

Occasional antisemitic incidents still occur, such as Holocaust denial and antisemitic pronouncements by Slovene right-wingers. In April 2024, a World Jewish Congress delegation gathered in Slovenia in response to the Jewish community's call for governmental response to rising antisemitism. Following the delegation, WJC Executive Vice President Maram Stern issued an open letter to the Slovenian Minister of Foreign and European Affairs Tanja Fajon. The letter stated that "Invariably, tendentious attacks on Israel fan the flames of antisemitism… Ultimately, the people of Slovenia and the government will be most affected by the hatred that has been metastasizing throughout the country, and only you and your colleagues can administer the cure.”

The only functioning Synagogue in Slovenia has been in the Jewish Cultural Center at Križevniška 3 in Ljubljana since 2016, where the sefer torah of the Slovene Jewish community is located. Rituals are occasional for Sabbaths and for major Jewish holidays.

In 2021, a new Synagogue was opened in Ljubljana, which is also the first synagogue that is not managed by the municipality, but directly by the Jewish community.

== Notable Jews from Slovenia ==
- Israel Isserlin, Medieval rabbi from Maribor
- Kohn, President of Jewish community of Slovenia
- Dr Aleksandar Švarc (Solomon Schwarz), President of the Jewish community of Slovenia
- Dr Rosa Fertig-Švarc, President of the Jewish community of Slovenia
- Mladen A. Švarc, Official Secretary and President of the Jewish community of Slovenia
- Paul Parin, psychoanalyst

== See also ==
- Carlo Michelstaedter
- Graziadio Isaia Ascoli
- History of the Jews in Trieste
- Jewish Cultural Center (Ljubljana)
- Synagogue Ljubljana
- History of the Jews in Yugoslavia

== Notes and references ==
- Jewish Virtual Library – Slovenia, Stephanie Persin
- Jewish Monuments in Slovenia
- Excerpts from Jews in Yugoslavia – Part I
- Demographic Overview, Jewish Community of Slovenia
