= Joseph Colon Trabotto =

Italian rabbi

Joseph Colon ben Solomon Trabotto, also known as Maharik, (c. 1420 in Chambéry – 1480 in Pavia) was a 15th-century rabbi who is considered Italy's foremost Judaic scholar and Talmudist of his era.

== Early years ==
Colon (whose name is related to the French word colombe, or 'dove') was a scion of the Trabotto family, which traced its lineage to Rashi and was known for its large number of scholars. After the final expulsion of Jews from the French Kingdom in 1394, his family emigrated first to the Franche-Comté and subsequently settled in the city of Chambéry, the capital of the Duchy of Savoy, which was home to a significant population of rabbinic scholars. Among these were Yohanan Treves, the last chief rabbi of France and Yeshaya Astruc ben Abba Mari.

The exact year and place of Colon's birth cannot be determined, but is estimated to be at the beginning of the 1420s in Chambéry, a city whose Jewish population was overwhelmingly made up of individuals of French, rather than German, origin. It was within this ambience that the young Colon received his Talmudic education, which was heavily imbued with the style, traditions and Talmudic methodology of medieval French Jewry. Chiefly, he studied under the tutelage of his father, Solomon Trabotto, a noted Talmudist and Kabbalist, though he referred to others as his teachers, and recalled participating in learned discussion with other local scholars. Colon left Chambéry in the early 1450s and settled in the Italian Piedmont, which had become part of the Duchy of Savoy. This move was the result of a combination of new opportunities on the other side of the Alps, combined with increasing anti-Judaism in Trans-Alpine Savoy. It was not, however, as Grätz claims, a consequence of the expulsion of the Jews from Savoy, which only occurred in 1471. For a time he led a wandering life, and was forced to gain his living by teaching children.

== Travels and growing fame as scholar ==
About 1469 Colon officiated as rabbi in Piove di Sacco, in Venetian territory and continued on to Mestre, near Venice. Subsequently he was rabbi at Bologna and Mantua and, according to a report in Gedaliah Ibn Yahya's Shalshelet ha-Qabbalah, became embroiled in a quarrel with Rabbi Judah Messer Leon, both being banished by the authorities. Thereupon he relocated to Pavia. At the same time Colon's decisions in civil as well as religious questions were sought from far and wide—from German cities, such as Ulm and Nuremberg, as well as from Constantinople. He wrote a commentary on the Pentateuch, and novellæ on the Talmud and on the legal codex of Moses of Coucy, the Sefer Mitzvot Gadol. However, his major legacy was his responsa. These were collected after his death by his son-in-law Rabbi Gershon Treves, and by one of his pupils, Hiyya Meïr ben David and were published in Venice in 1519 by Daniel Bomberg. They were subsequently republished many times. In 1984, E. D. Pines published fifty new responsa from manuscript. Many more of his responsa remain unpublished.

== Responsa ==
Colon's responsa are among the classic productions in this field of rabbinic literature and exercised tremendous influence on the subsequent development of Jewish Law, or halakhah. His decisions had massive influence upon all subsequent legal development. His influence is particularly notable in the Ashkenazic orbit, as reflected in Moses Isserles' glosses on the Shulhan Arukh. Colon's responsa were the central pillar of later Italian halakhah, and there is scarcely an Italian rabbi of the 16th, 17th and 18th century who does not quote him. These responsa are distinguished by his encyclopedic knowledge and methodical analysis of sources. He attempts to identify the basic principles underlying his sources and to elucidate the conceptual framework within which he renders his rulings. His legal method also resembles the mode of analysis known as pilpul. Established custom (or minhag) played a unique place in his thinking and he defines its authority. In this context, he served as the defender of a uniquely French school of Ashkenazic law and lore. The Mishneh Torah of Maimonides enjoys a preeminent place in his writings. His extensive comments thereupon, scattered throughout his responsa and lecture notes, helped to set the agenda for later scholars. Colon's responsa are marked by tremendous deference to authorities of the past. Hesitating to decide between them, he resorted to methods of legal determination which removed or minimized this necessity (e.g., Halakha k’Bathra’i).

Colon reproved Rabbi Israel Bruna, the foremost German talmudist of his time, for overstepping the bounds of his authority. Responsum No. 4, addressed to the congregation of Regensburg, is highly important. A number of Jews of that community having been falsely accused, and a sum of money having to be raised for their ransom, the surrounding places and neighboring communities refused to contribute, at least insofar as it was a question of paying a fixed tax instead of making voluntary contributions. Colon decided that the communities in question could not refuse to pay their share, since the same false accusation might be made against them also, and if the accused in this case were proved innocent and ransomed, they would then be safe from danger.

== Dispute with Capsali ==
It was natural that a man of Colon's stamp should sometimes be carried too far in his zeal for truth and justice; and this happened in his dispute with Capsali, the ḥakham-bashi (Chief Rabbi) of Turkey. Having been falsely informed by an emissary ("meshullaḥ") on behalf of the people of Jerusalem, that Capsali was very lax in divorce decisions, and that he had declared that the betrothed of a man who had become converted to Christianity should be considered as single, and that he had declared an engagement void because it had not been entered into according to the laws of the community, Colon, in order to establish the sanctity and inviolability of marriage beyond the power of any individual rabbi, wrote three letters (Responsa Nos. 83, 84, 85) to the president and leaders of the community of Constantinople. The responsa threatened to place Capsali under the ban if he did not recall his decisions and do public penance; and at the same time making it understood that in no case would Capsali ever again be allowed to fill the office of rabbi (Responsum No. 83).

This decree of an Italian rabbi pronounced against a Turkish colleague was an unprecedented attack on the rights of the community, and provoked the righteous indignation of the Jewish social order in Constantinople—all the more as it proved to rest upon a groundless and vulgar calumny. Capsali, conscious of having been maligned, did not mince matters in answering Colon's letters; and a bitter discussion arose between the two men, in which the leading rabbis of Germany, Italy, and the Orient took part. It is characteristic of Colon that as soon as he became convinced that he had been the victim of an intrigue, and so had done injustice to the ḥakham bashi, he did not hesitate to make amends. On his deathbed, he commissioned his son Perez to go to Constantinople and ask, in his father's name, the forgiveness of Capsali.

Trabotto died in Pavia at the age of about sixty. Most references agree on his year of death, although one lists it as 1484, four years later than generally accepted.
