= Jacob Weil =

German rabbi

Jacob Ben Judah Weil also known as Jacob Halevi Weil, later known as Mahariv (Hebrew: יעקב בן יהודה ווייל) was a German rabbi and posek who as one of the Rishonim, was an active Talmudic authority during the first half of the fifteenth century.

== Early life ==
Weil's main teacher was Jacob Moelin (the Maharil), who ordained Weil into the rabbinate, and appointed him to the rabbinate in Nuremberg and to establish a yeshiva there. Weil, however, initially did not accept the position lest he offend an older scholar, Solomon Cohen (also rendered Zalman Katz), who had been appointed rabbi of that city long before. This despite the fact that Weil himself ruled that a rabbi had no lifetime tenure (Responsa, No. 151). However by 1422, Weil was serving in Nuremberg.

== Later life ==
Weil was later called to the rabbinate of Erfurt; and congregations far and near, recognizing him as an authority, addressed their problems to him. Among the rabbis who addressed questions to him are Rabbi Israel Isserlein (Maharya) and his student Rabbi Israel Bruna. Weil approved of the pilpulistic method only as an aid to study, but rendered legal decisions purely on the basis of logic (Responsa, No. 164). According to historian Heinrich Graetz, Weil died before 1456.

Weil was especially severe on contemporary rabbis who regarded themselves as having peculiar privileges transcending the rights of the laity, declaring in a responsum (No. 163) that no rabbis of his time had any such prerogatives, and that, moreover, no man could be regarded as a scholar (Talmid Ḥakam) in the Talmudic sense. Despite his humility and his belief in the value of peace, when he felt that the need arose Weil did not spare his pen. After his father in law refused to repay the debt of a man who paid the ransom of his mother in law, Weill ruled that "since I am close to the case, it is my responsibility to take action and to nullify his evil decree (not to repay the debt) so that a mishap does not occur in Israel and the door is not closed on those who perform good deeds and the name of heaven is not desecrated ... and if he does not obey this strict ruling he is to be cursed and excommunicated and separated from all that is holy" (Resp. No. 148).

Of Weil's works only a collection of opinions and decisions, "She'elot u-Teshubot" (Venice, 1549; republished in Hanau, 1610), has been preserved. To this work was added an appendix entitled "Sheḥiṭot u-Bediḳot," containing regulations for slaughtering and for the examination of slaughtered cattle. These rules have been regarded as authoritative by later rabbis, have run through seventy-one editions, and have been the subjects of various commentaries and additions.

== Personality ==
Weil's refusal to accept the chief rabbinate in Nuremberg illustrated two facets of Weil's personality: his deep humility and a desire to avoid unnecessary confrontation and conflict. He generally signed his responsa "the little one, Jacob Weil".
