= Leket Yosher =

Book on Jewish law

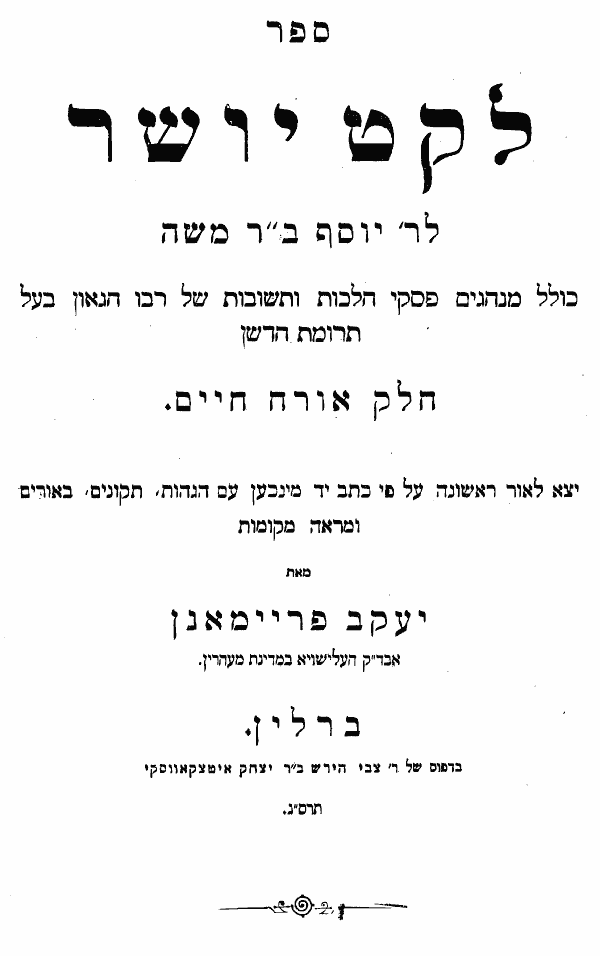
- Author: Rabbi Joseph (Joslein) ben Moses (c. 1420–1488)
- Language: Hebrew
- Genre: Jewish law
- Published: 1903
- Website: https://www.hebrewbooks.org/8859

Leḳeṭ Yosher (Hebrew: לקט יושר) is a book on Jewish law compiled by Rabbi Joseph (Joslein) ben Moses (c. 1420–1488).

Having studied for five years under Rabbi Israel Isserlein, Rabbi Joseph traveled to the Rhine provinces, but returned to his teacher, whose decisions, he committed to manuscript at the request of his fellow students, subject to Rabbi Isserlein's corrections. In 1463, three years after Rabbi Isserlein's death, Rabbi Joseph began to arrange the material for publication, continuing the task at Cremona (1474) and finishing it in 1488. It is arranged in the order of the Arba'ah Turim. The work, besides its halakhic value, contains many passages bearing on the lives of Rabbi Isserlein and his students and illustrating the manners and customs of rabbinical academies in that period. Also incorporated in the Leḳeṭ Yosher are the decisions of a pupil of Rabbi Shalom of Austria, for which he was praised by Rabbi Isserlein. He included also some of the collectanea of Judah Obernik.

== Manuscript ==
One copy of Leket Yosher is extant in manuscript (Munich MSS., Nos. 404, 405).
