= Jewish Cultural Center (Ljubljana) =

Jewish cultural center in Ljubljana, Slovenia

- Location of the cultural center in Slovenia
- Established: 2013
- Location: Križevniška 3, Ljubljana, Slovenia
- Coordinates: 46°02′48″N 14°30′15″E
- Founder: Robert Waltl
- Owner: Privately owned
- Website: www.jkc.si

The Jewish Cultural Center is a privately owned Jewish cultural center and museum of Jewish history, located in Ljubljana, Slovenia. Founded in 2013, the center's exhibitions blend topics of Judaism and history through art, innovation, and creativity. Usual activities of Jewish communities are expanded upon, to include more entertaining, and educational topics through theater and puppet performances, concerts, lectures, large events for Jewish holidays, and other social gatherings.

The Jewish Center is home to the first Jewish museum in Slovenia, as well as the first functioning synagogue since the Maribor Synagogue shut down. Ljubljana's Mini teater is the most important partner in the implementation of these programs. Its premises are intended for permanent public events and programs (puppet and theatre performances, concerts, literary evenings, exhibitions, lectures, Holocaust education programs, book promotions, Hebrew courses, meetings, socializing, film screenings, and discussions).

== History ==
Robert Waltl and a group of individuals in Ljubljana founded the Jewish Cultural Center. The aim was to promote and practice Jewish culture, establish a museum and a place for prayer, as well as to promote cultural cooperation between the Jews in Slovenia, the diaspora, and Israel. The Mini Theatre is the most important partner in the implementation of these programs. Its premises are intended for permanent public events and programs (puppet and theatre performances, concerts, literary evenings, exhibitions, lectures, Holocaust education programs, book promotions, Hebrew courses, meetings, socializing, film screenings, and discussions).

The most notable events are the annual House of Tolerance Festival, the public celebration of Hanukkah every year, commemorative events marking the World Holocaust Remembrance Day, where Robert Waltl reads all the names of Slovenian victims of the Holocaust, and the celebration of Jewish holidays. The center also serves as an educational institution, where educational mornings and lectures are held, for young people and adults teaching about Jewish culture and the Holocaust.

== Projects ==
=== Stolpersteine ===
On 22 September 2022, the final of 150 stolpersteine were laid in front of the cultural center in honor of predominately Jews from Croatia who escaped Croatia in 1941 and took refuge in Ljubljana, until the capitulation of Italy in September 1943. They subsequently perished during the Holocaust. The first stumbling block was laid in Ljubljana on 6 August 2018 on Cankar's Embankment. Over the ensuring four years, the remaining stolpersteine were progressingly laid.

=== The House of Tolerance Festival ===
The House of Tolerance Festival in Ljubljana is a public platform where participants remember the Holocaust and, since 2015, draw attention to modern forms of intolerance and hatred. The festival was founded under the leadership of the festival president, Branko Lustig, a two-time Academy Award-winner, and a Holocaust survivor. The festival is a regional franchise, being held every year in Zagreb, Rijeka, Maribor, Belgrade, Vienna, Sarajevo, Cetinje, and Ljubljana. The main topic of the programs is the Holocaust and various types of intolerance, draw attention on the need to fight antisemitism and other forms of discrimination.

== See also ==
- History of the Jews in Slovenia
