= Israel of Krems =

German Rishon, author of Hagahot Ashri commentary on the Rosh

Israel of Krems was an Austrian rabbi who flourished in the 14th and 15th centuries. He was the great-grandfather of Israel ben Petahiah Isserlein, who quotes him in his commentary on Rashi to the Pentateuch, section "Wayeḥi." Israel was the author of Haggahot Asheri, notes on Rabbeinu Asher's Talmudic compendium, printed with the text. Grätz identifies Israel of Krems with the Israel whom Emperor Rupert appointed, by a decree of May 3, 1407, chief rabbi of all the German communities ("Hochmeister über alle Rabbinen"), giving him a certificate declaring him to be a great Talmudic scholar and a good man.

But as Israel's functions included the civil control of the Jews, and especially the collection of the taxes, the German rabbis opposed his appointment. Some of them even threatened him with excommunication in case he did not resign. The emperor, upon hearing of this, confirmed Israel's appointment as chief rabbi by a second decree (November 23, 1407), imposing a fine of twenty gold marks on any one refusing to submit to him. But the edicts had little effect, and the office of the chief rabbi became obsolete soon after its creation. No further mention of Israel occurs until 1415, when he is mentioned in a document of Emperor Sigismund, appointing him to superintend the collection of the Jewish taxes, in which office he was the subordinate of the hereditary chamberlain Conrad of Weinsberg.

== Jewish Encyclopedia bibliography ==
- Grätz, Gesch. 3d ed., viii. 102–104;
- Stobbe, Die Juden in Deutschland, pp. 148, 259, Brunswick, 1866;
- Fuenn, Keneset Yisrael, pp. 702–703;
- Frankel-Grün, Gesch. der Juden in Kremsier, i.14, 15, Breslau, 1896.
