= Israel Bruna =

German rabbi

Rabbi Israel of Bruna (ישראל ברונא; 1480–1400) was a Moravian-German rabbi and Posek (decisor on Jewish Law). He is also known as Mahari Bruna, the Hebrew acronym for "Our Teacher, the Rabbi, Israel Bruna". Rabbi Bruna is best known as one of the primary Ashkenazi authorities quoted by Moses Isserles in the Shulkhan Arukh.

== Biography ==
Rabbi Bruna was born in Brno in the Bohemian Kingdom. He is often stated as "been born in Germany", probably because until 1806 the Kingdom of Bohemia was an Imperial Estate in the Holy Roman Empire. He studied under the leading Ashkenazi rabbis of his time: Jacob Weil and Israel Isserlin, who ordained him and spoke very highly of him. "He was a brilliant student, who devoted himself, body and soul, to the study of the Talmud." He was then elected rabbi of his hometown of Brno, known in Talmudic Hebrew literature as "Bruna". After the expulsion of the Jews from that city (1454) he settled at Ratisbon, Bavaria, where he opened a yeshivah.

His later life has been described as "eventful and troublesome".

- His position in Ratisbon caused some controversy, dividing the community. Rabbi Anschel Segal, who already was operating a yeshivah there, felt Rabbi Bruna should have opened his yeshivah elsewhere. Among Rabbi Anschel's followers there were some who resorted to painting the word "heretic" on Rabbi Bruna's seat in the synagogue, and when he preached, they would stage a walkout. Rabbi Bruna, however, bore the attacks and insults with humility, and on the death of Rabbi Segal, he was accepted by the whole community.
- In 1474, following a dispute between Frederick III, Holy Roman Emperor and Duke Ludwig of Landsberg over a tax placed on the Jewish community, Bruna was imprisoned by the Emperor to compel him to use his authority in the Emperor's favor; he was released after thirteen days in prison.
- Rabbi Bruna was later threatened with execution based on a charge of Blood libel, brought by a convert to Christianity, Hans Vagol. The community appealed to Frederick III, as well as to King Ladislav of Bohemia, both of whom declared Rabbi Bruna innocent.

== Works ==
Rabbi Bruna was one of the greatest Talmudic authorities of his time: rabbis and scholars from various cities and countries sent him their queries on all matters relating to Jewish law. These responsa, Teshuvot Mahari Bruna, are his best known work. Importantly, they served as a source of Halakha for Moses Isserles' HaMapah - the gloss on the Shulkhan Arukh describing differences between Ashkenazi and Sephardi practice. See also History of Responsa: Fifteenth century
