= Lendava Synagogue =

Former Orthodox synagogue in Lendava, Slovenia

- Slovene: Sinagoga Lendava; Hungarian: Lendvai Zsinagóga; German: Synagoge von Lindau
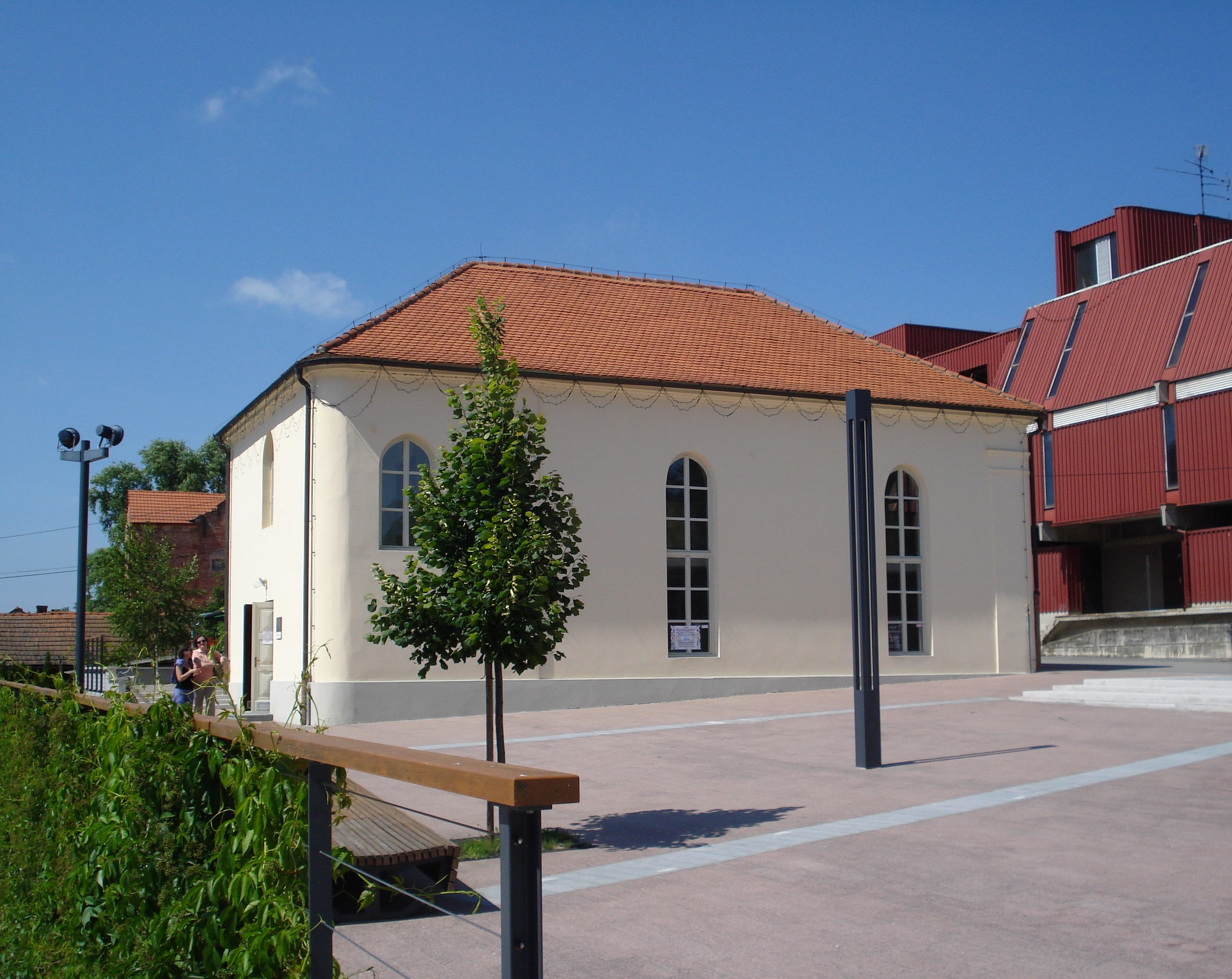
- Exterior of the former synagogue in 2010

- Location of the former synagogue in Slovenia

Religion
- Affiliation: Orthodox Judaism (former)
- Rite: Nusach Ashkenaz
- Ecclesiastical or organizational status: Synagogue (1866–1944); Jewish museum (since c. 1995)
- Status: Closed (as a synagogue); Repurposed

Location
- Location: 5 Spodnja Street, Lendava
- Country: Slovenia
- Interactive map of Lendava Synagogue
- Coordinates: 46°33′45″N 16°27′14″E

Architecture
- Type: Synagogue architecture
- Style: Classical Revival; Biedermeier
- Established: 1773 (as a congregation)
- Completed: 1866
- Materials: Brick

Website
- sinagoga.gml.si

The Lendava Synagogue (Slovene: Sinagoga Lendava, Hungarian: Lendvai Zsinagóga, German: Synagoge von Lindau) is a former Orthodox Jewish congregation and synagogue, located in the small town of Lendava, Slovenia, a town that is close to the Hungarian border. The former congregation was established in 1773 and worshiped in the Ashkenazi rite. The former synagogue was completed in 1866 and was used as a synagogue up until 1944, when the community perished in The Holocaust.

Left vacant for many years, the former synagogue was repurposed as a Jewish museum, called the Galerija-Muzej Lendava, in the mid-1990s. The museum has a permanent exhibition on local Jewish history.

== History ==
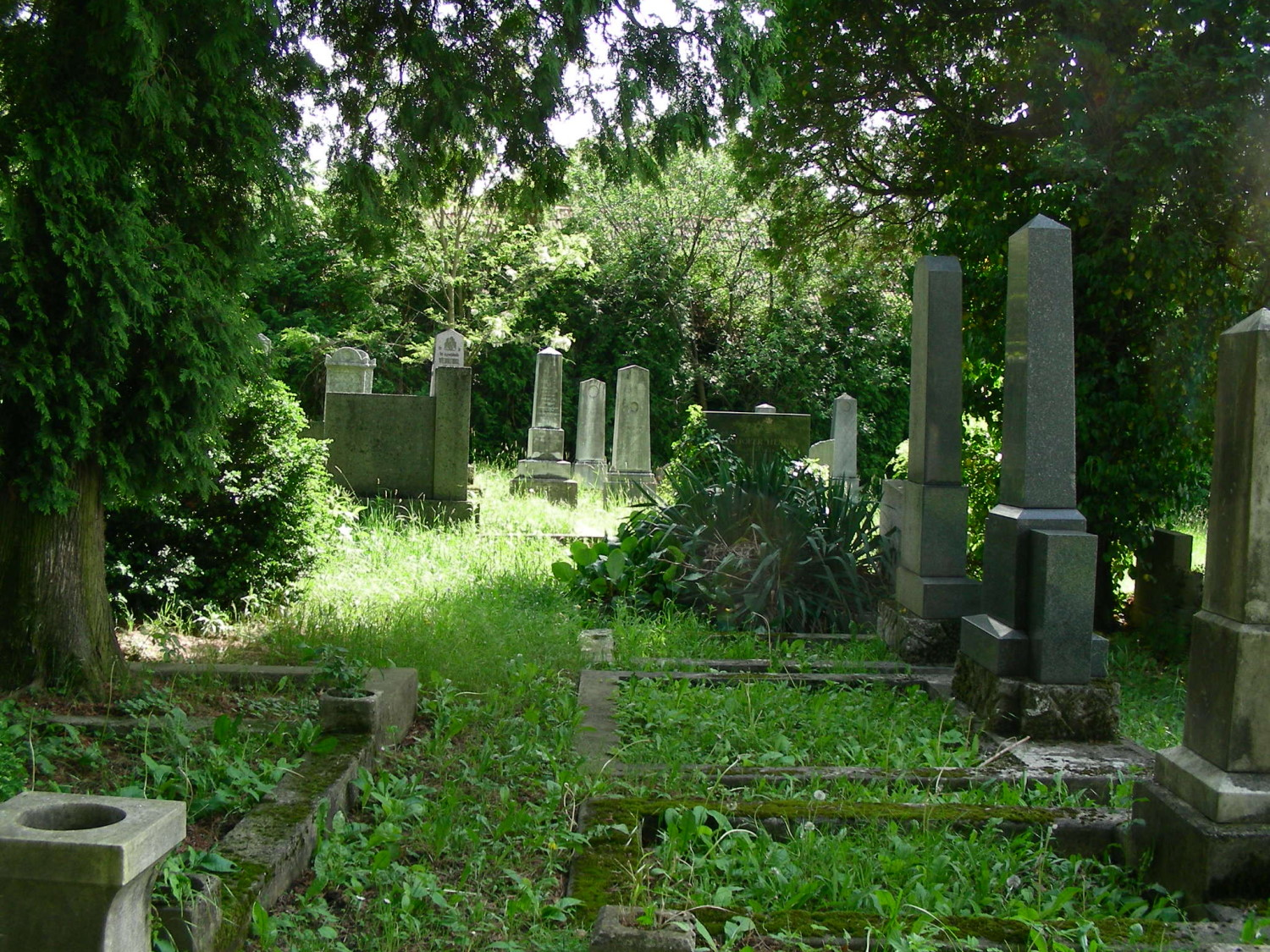
Cemetery

Jews from Hungary settled in Lendava in 1773. Local Jews at the end of the 18th century gathered to pray at the home of the innkeeper Bodog Weisz. In 1837, the community rented a house for use as a prayer hall, which had 50 seats. In 1843, the community rented and then purchased another building, which was the first synagogue owned by the community.

Construction on a new synagogue began in 1866, and this building still stands in the center of town at Spodnja ulica 5. It is a boxy, rectangular brick structure with a peaked roof, designed in the Classical Revival or Biedermeier style. The corners are decorated with slightly raised, flat false pilasters. Heavily damaged by the Germans, the building was sold to the town after the World War II by the Jewish Federation of Yugoslavia and was used as a warehouse.

Work began in 1994 to renovate the synagogue for use as a culture center which will also have an exhibition on local Jewish history in the women's gallery. The only original interior decorative elements remaining in the building are six fluted cast iron pillars supporting a rebuilt gallery, plus stairway railings and a small niche in the stairwell. The one-time circular (rose) window over the Ark has been changed into an arched window, and two of the arched side windows (which exist on the south side only) have been lengthened and enlarged. The third (left hand) window on the south side has been left at apparently its original shape and size. There is also an arched window over the door in the West side.

Near the former synagogue, was a Jewish school, that functioned from 1850 until the 1921 and was demolished in the end of the 1990s to allow the construction of a Hungarian cultural centre, and a cemetery with 176 tombstones, about 40 from the second half of the 19th century, most of the rest from the 20th century near the village of Dolga Vas, just outside town.

== See also ==
- History of the Jews in Slovenia
