= Capsali =

Caspali is a surname. Notable people with this surname include:

- Elijah Capsali (c. 1485 – after 1550), Ottoman rabbi and historian
- Floria Capsali (1900–1982), Ottoman-born Romanian ballerina, choreographer, and dance teacher
- Moses Capsali (1420–1495), Venetian-born Jewish rabbi in the Ottoman Empire
