= Israel Isserlein =

Austrian rabbi (1390–1460)

Israel Isserlin (Hebrew: :ישראל איסרלן בן פתחיה; Israel Isserlein ben Petachia; 1390 in Maribor, Duchy of Styria – 1460 in Wiener Neustadt, Lower Austria) was a Talmudist, and Halakhist, best known for his Terumat HaDeshen, which served as one source for HaMapah, the component of the Shulkhan Arukh by Moses Isserles. He is also known as Israel of Neustadt, Israel of Marpurk, and Maharai.

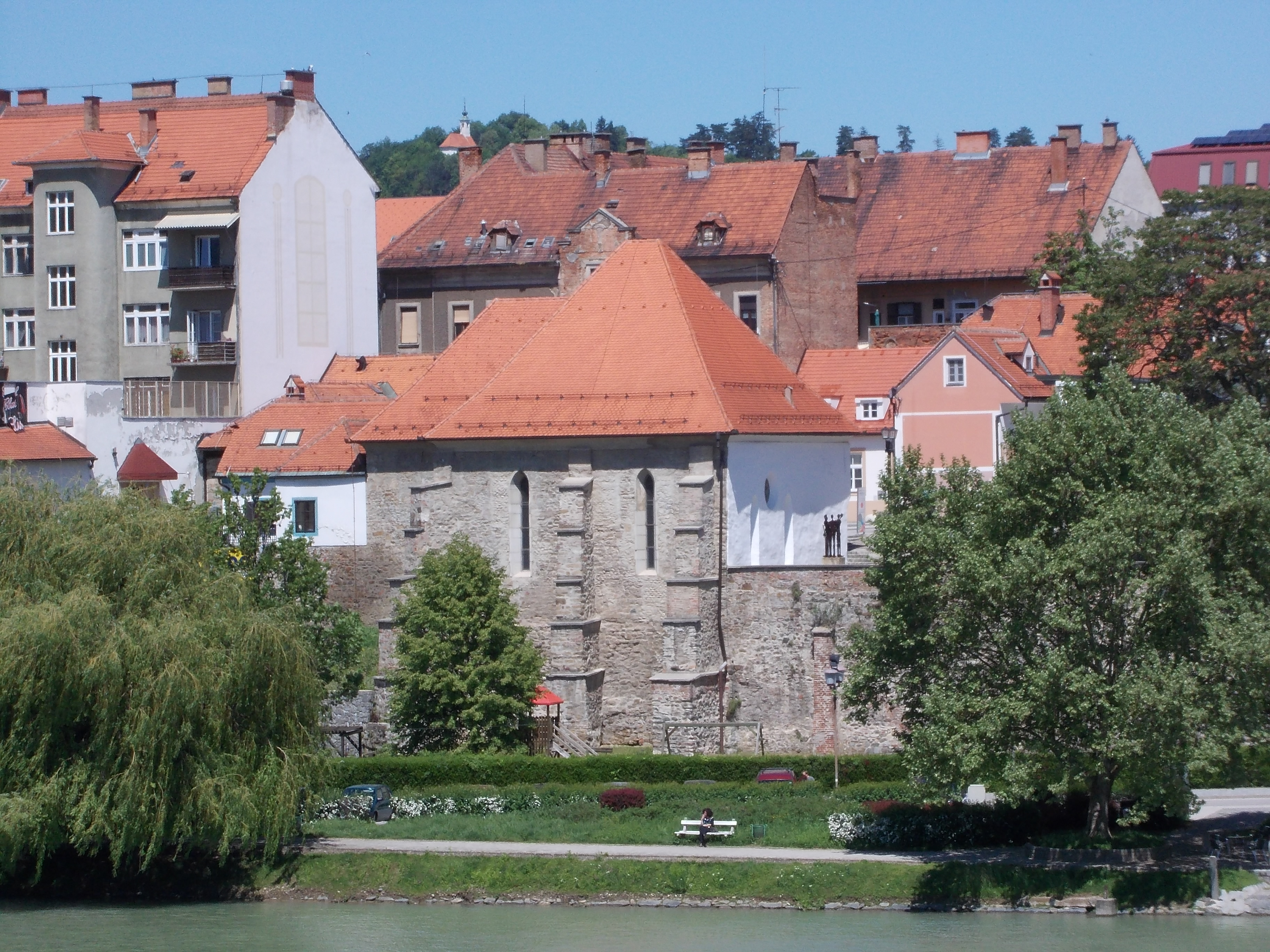
The Old Synagogue of Maribor, for many years home of the Maari.

== Personal life ==
Even though Regensburg in Bavaria is often quoted in literature as Isserlein's birthplace it is now clear that he was born in the Styrian Maribor present-day Slovenia, in the last decade of the 14th century. As a son of R. Petachia of Maribor he came from a well-known scholarly family. His grandfather Rabbi Chaim, named Henschel of Hainburg or Hetschlein of Herzogenburg was well-versed in Jewish learning, which held especially for Isserlein's great-grandfather R. Israel of Krems. R. Shalom of Neustadt was related to him.

He is considered to be the most influential rabbi of the Empire in the second third of the 15th century and the last great rabbi of medieval Austria. With his wife Schoendlein he had four sons named Petachia (Kachil, Khatschel), Abraham, Shalom, Aaron, and a daughter Muscat, who died in her childhood.

After the early death of his father, it appears, he and his mother moved to Krems, where his uncle R. Aron Bluemlein of Krems/Vienna was teaching, and was together with his mother a victim of the Vienna Gesera in 1421. He studied also in Vienna and in Eger (or Cheb) and probably also in Italy.

Soon after the Gzerah he returned to Maribor, where he started to serve as a rabbi; already in 1425 his correspondence and socializing with other scholars of his age is attested. Such a scholar was, for instance, Anshel of Maribor (Anshel Marpurk). His authority also included ordination of other rabbis. Responsa of rabbis Israel Bruna, Moses Mintz and Jacob Moelin or the Maharil of Mainz quotes Isserlein with great respect. For an unknown reason he moved to Neustadt, where he is attested in 1445, even though due to the fact that he frequently traveled between Maribor and Neustadt, we can assume that he actually took residence in Neustadt around 1450. He dealt with money-lending only marginally and with small sums of money. In Neustadt, as before in Maribor, he started to run a yeshiva until 1460, when he died. Because of his activities he is also named R. Israel Marpurk and R. Israel of Noyshtat. On many occasions he signed himself as 'The small one and the young one in Israel' (Ha-katan ve-ha-tzair she-be-Israel).

His pupils were coming from Austria, Bohemia, Moravia, Hungary, Silesia, Bavaria, and the Rhineland, among them Israel Bruna of Brno, Moses Mintz, and Joseph b. Moses. He is considered as an ideal type of medieval rabbi, who demanded from the community and its members a strict observance of ritual laws, social justice and fairness in business and commerce. He was prone to mysticism, studied kabbalistic works and accepted some kabbalistic customs as his own, even though he was also acquainted with the contemporary Christian scientific literature. He often served as an arbitrator between different communities and his decision was considered final. With the appearance of the press and the codification of halachah his responsa were included in numerous collections, the most prominent being the Shulchan Aruch. His works include: Trumat ha-Deshen, 354 responses, edited by himself, and Psakim u-Chtavim, 267 responses, edited by his pupils after his death (both printed in Venice already in 1519), Beurim, commentaries on Rashi's Commentary on Torah, 36 Shearim (36 Gates), laws on Kashrut, and Seder Gitin, a handbook for divorces.

His oldest son Petachia or R. Kachil studied at his father's yeshivah, where he served as his secretary. In his father's name he even answered a question of R. Abraham from Poland. He married in Maribor. On 3 June 1489 he was still involved in lending money. On 12 November 1489 and on 8 March 1493 he is mentioned in Graz, with Nassan (Natan), son of Khatschl of Maribor or R. Kachil or Petachia, son of R. Israel Isserlein.

His wife, Schoendlein, was also learned and wrote a full Teshuva in Yiddish on Hilchot Niddah in the name of her husband.

== Works ==
=== Terumat HaDeshen ===
Terumat HaDeshen is a work in two parts. The first part of is a collection of 354 responsa by R' Isserlein. The work is named for the practice in the Temple in Jerusalem of removing a part of the previous day's ashes from the furnace – 354 is the numerical value of Deshen (Hebrew: דשן). Terumat HaDeshen serves as an important source of the practices of the Ashkenazi Jews. The work was therefore used by R' Moses Isserles as one basis for HaMapah – the component of the Shulkhan Arukh which specifies divergences between Sephardi and Ashkenazi practice. The second part of Terumat haDeshen, entitled Pesakim u-ketavim, contains 267 decisions largely on points of the marriage law.

According to Shabbatai ha-Kohen (the "Shach"), it was "known" that Rabbi Isserlein was not answering questions posed to him in the Terumat HaDeshen, rather he actually wrote the questions and answers himself. Therefore (Shach concludes) unlike with other responsa, the parameters of the questions posed in the Terumat HaDeshen are themselves binding when alluded to in the answer. However, with the printing of the work Leket Yosher of Joseph (Joselein) ben Moses in 1903, it became apparent that the responsa were in fact based on actual questions, as the individuals who asked the questions are clearly identified there.
