= Palestinian rabbis =

The history of Palestinian rabbis encompasses the Israelites from the Anshi Knesses HaGedola period up until the modern era, but most significantly refers to the early Jewish sages who dwelled in the Holy Land and compiled the Mishna and its later commentary, the Jerusalem Talmud. During the Talmudic and later Geonim period, Palestinian rabbis exerted influence over Syria and Egypt, whilst the authorities in Babylonia had held sway over the Jews of Iraq and Iran. While the Jerusalem Talmud was not to become authoritative against the Babylonian Talmud, the liturgy developed by Palestinian rabbis was later destined to form the foundation of the minhag Ashkenaz that was used by nearly all Ashkenazi communities across Europe before Hasidic Judaism.

While the Palestinian Jewish population waned with the arrival of the Crusaders in the 11th century, by the 16th century, rabbis in Palestine had again made the Land of Israel a centre of Jewish learning. So significant had the Jewish population become, a novel plan to revive the ancient "ordination" was attempted. Seen by the Ottoman authorities as a precursor to Jewish self-rule, the scheme did not materialise. Nevertheless, the high calibre of rabbinical scholarship ensured that Judaism continued to flourish in the region.

== Early rabbis ==
The zugot and the tannaim, terms given to early rabbis, were active in Judea from around 150 BCE to 200 CE. After the destruction of the Temple in Jerusalem, scholars in Palestine came to accept the honorific "rabbi". During this period, they compiled the Mishna, which was later expounded upon and recorded in the Jerusalem Talmud.

Johanan bar Nappaha (c. 220–250 CE) was considered the greatest Palestinian amora of his time, and according to Adin Steinsaltz, "the most glorious epoch of Palestinian learning" ensued when he was appointed rector of the academy in Tiberias. The great sages in the Talmudic academies in Babylonia (Lower Mesopotamia) saw him as the spiritual leader of the generation and many of them moved to Tiberias to study under him; indeed, some of the greatest Palestinian sages were Babylonians who had migrated to Palestine to further their studies.

Johanan succeeded in turning the Tiberian Academy into the world's supreme centre for the study of the Oral Torah. It was common for disputes in the Babylonian academies to be settled with "a letter from Palestine." The works of the Palestinian rabbis became the foundation for all Babylonian literary activity, so much so, that Palestinian traditions and teachings are to be found on nearly every page of the Babylonian Talmud. This transmission was made possible by scholars who travelled back and forth between the two centres.

According to recent scholarship, any influence wielded by the Palestinian rabbis during the second century was not due to an established hierarchical position, as they lacked institutionalised power: no synagogues or other communal institutions were under their control. They were instead a "self-proclaimed elite" who achieved recognition based on their social position, which included wealth, learning, or charisma. While being approached for advice and guidance, most of the Palestinian rabbis never held any official authority and instead engaged in teaching a select group of students. This changed with the establishment of the Sanhedrin in the Galilee, called the "Great Patriarchate", towards the end of the second century, when some rabbis found employment at its various institutions.

From the third century, the circumstances of rabbis continued to change, with many taking on formal positions as communal preachers, scribes, or beth din judges. During this period, Palestinian rabbis were especially concentrated in Lydda, Sepphoris, Tiberias, and Caesarea Maritima.

From the mid-fourth century, Palestinian rabbis found themselves surrounded by an increasingly Christian-orientated environment. It is commonly acknowledged that the Palestinian rabbis were in dialogue with early Christians and other Hellenists. Most of the recorded instances of heretics (minim) using scripture to challenge rabbinic interpretations involve Palestinian rabbis.

It has been suggested that Palestinian rabbis interacted more with the common folk than their Babylonian counterparts, to the extent that several Palestinian sources depict them "dining and partying together"; they were also on more familiar terms, addressing their fellow Palestinians as "my son" or "my daughter". They tended not to highlight the significant distinction between the two groups.

A further indication of the Palestinian rabbis' effort to strengthen bonds with the commoners is revealed by their willingness to approach the wealthy among them for financial support. Other Palestinian rabbis were engaged in a range of livelihoods, including occupations as scribes, physicians, merchants, artisans, blacksmiths, builders and shoemakers. Many also knew foreign languages, a necessity for appointment to the Sanhedrin.

The decentralisation of the Palestinian rabbinate occurred towards the end of the tanna Judah ha-Nasi's lifetime when he allocated various roles to different rabbis. Soon after, rabbis began to dissociate themselves from the Gallilean Sanhedrin after its nasis or "patriarchs" (Hebrew: נְשִׂיאִים, romanized: nəśiʾim, lit. 'princes') attempted to replace rabbis and integrate wealthy individuals into positions of authority. During the office of Gamaliel III (ca. 225–235), many prominent scholars established their own academies.

In 351, in the middle of the Roman civil war of 350–353, the magister militum Ursicinus destroyed Jewish communities during the Jewish revolt against Constantius Gallus, including the academies. In around 425, the office of the nasi was abolished after a period of some 350 years.

== Palestinian Gaonim and Masoretes ==
From the middle of the ninth century onwards, the rabbis of Palestine had established a structured central legalistic body representing the Jewish community. Based first in Tiberias and then in Jerusalem, the Palestinian Gaonate functioned for around 200 years. The conquest of Fatimid Jerusalem in 1071 by the Seljuk dynasty led to the transfer of the Gaonate to Fatimid-controlled Tyre, Lebanon in 1071.

When the Gaonate was exiled to the region of Syria, the heads of the Fustat Gaonate regarded themselves as the heirs to Palestine and wished to inherit their rights. However, the exiled Gaonate still expected Egyptian and Palestinian Jews residing in Egypt to acknowledge their leadership.

During this period, the Masoretes were active in compiling a system of pronunciation and grammatical guides of Biblical Hebrew. They also fixed the division of the Hebrew Bible, called the Masoretic Text (abbreviated as 𝕸), still regarded as authoritative today. The centres of Masoretic activity in Palestine developed along the lines of the Western or Palestinian tradition, distinguishable from the textual and vocalization systems that evolved in Babylonia.

One of the most notable rabbis of Palestine during the 13th century was Isaac ben Samuel of Acre, a Palestinian kabbalist who had to flee to the Iberian Peninsula after the 1291 Siege of Acre. The names of some rabbis of the period have not been preserved, such as the anonymous Palestinian author of Sha'arei Tzedek (written c. 1290–1295).

== Attempt to revive ordination ==
"We want to make ourselves strong for our people and the cities of our God, and to raise the banner of Torah which had been thrown to the ground and trodden down. Behold, this people of God is a unique people, a kingdom of priests, and a holy nation. It has been consecrated since the very earliest days. Nations paid visits to it; Judges and elders ruled over it in splendor and glory. [...] Now we have prayed to the Lord that He may spare a remnant of us and revive us, that He may lead us from the grave of our dispersion and persecution, which weighs terribly upon us in the countries of the nations, that He may bring us to this place which He has chosen, and into the city upon which His name is called, and that He may procure for us a firm dwelling place on His sacred soil. We, the humble ones of the flock on the sacred soil, have therefore, far beyond the words of this letter, made up our minds to be zealous for the glory of the Lord. [...] We have, therefore, chosen R. Berab, the greatest sage among us to be ordained as the head of the School. He shall be entitled to co-ordain others from among us. [...] May He let His glory rest upon the work of our hands and fulfil the word of His servant: 'And I will restore thy judges as at the first, and thy counsellors as at the beginning: afterwards thou shalt be called the City of Righteousness, the faithful city."

— Kobler, Franz (1952). Letters of Jews Through the Ages: From Biblical Times to the Middle of the Eighteenth Century. Ararat Pub. Society.

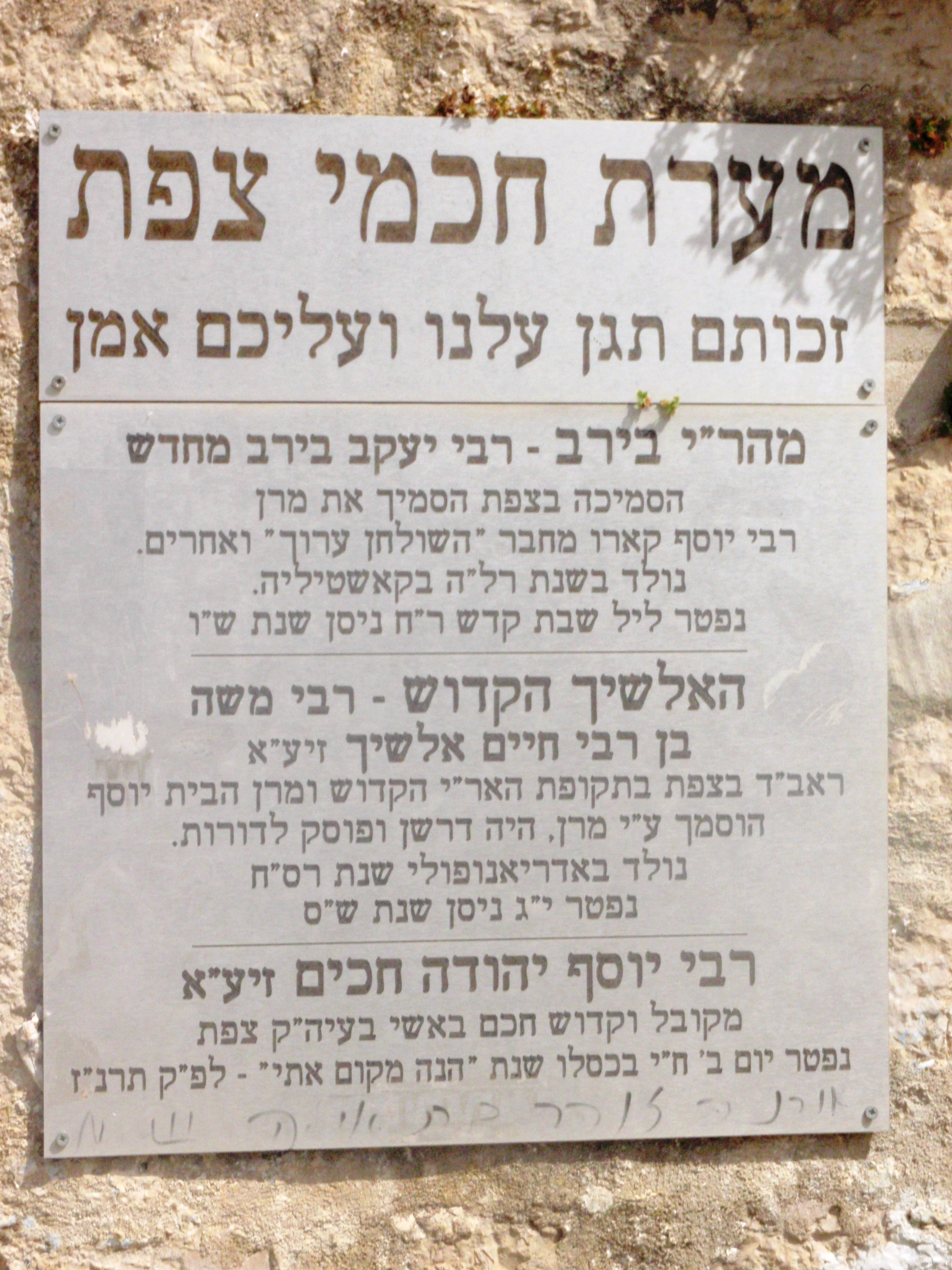
Plaque outside the burial cave of Jacob Berab (d. 1546), Safed

With the advent of the 16th century, hopes of the arrival of the Messiah intensified. A rabbi from Safed, Jacob Berab, believed the time was ripe to reintroduce the semikhah "ordination" tradition, which would create for the Jews a recognised central authority on subjects relating to the comprehension and interpretation of the Torah. Modelled on the Sanhedrin, the requirement for ordination was a necessity but proved an obstacle, as the procedure had fallen into disuse in the fourth century. With the backing of the scholars at Safed, Berab wished to rely on the opinion of Maimonides, that if all Palestinian rabbis agreed to ordain one of themselves, they could do so, and that the man of their choice could then ordain others, thereby recreating the chain of semikah transmission.

In 1538, Berab was ordained by an assembly of twenty-five rabbis meeting at Safed. This ordination conferred upon him the right to ordain others until they could form a Sanhedrin. Initially, there was little opposition when Berab argued that his ordination was legal from a Talmudic standpoint. However, circumstances changed when Berab ordained the chief rabbi at Jerusalem, Levi ben Jacob ibn Habib, who had for many years been his opponent. Ibn Habib considered it an insult to himself and Jerusalem that the scholars of Safed had undertaken to resume the practice of ordination without consulting with the scholars of Jerusalem. He wrote to the scholars of Safed, explaining his objections to their proceeding, which he considered illegal, and asserting that their action was a threat to rabbinical Judaism because a new Sanhedrin might use its authority to alter the calendar.

The conflict between the two rabbis was not beneficial to the success of the scheme. A more serious setback occurred when it became apparent that the Turkish authorities regarded the ordination of rabbis as the first step toward the restoration of the Jewish state. Berab was either deported or escaped to Egypt following threats to his life. He ordained four rabbis before his departure in the hope that they could continue to exercise the function of ordination during his absence. When Berab returned, ibn Habib's following had increased and Berab's ordination plan was doomed. The dispute among Palestinian scholars over ordination ended with Berab's death some years later.

The four men that Berab ordained included Joseph Karo, Moses ben Joseph di Trani, and possibly also Abraham Shalom and Israel ben Meir di Curiel. Karo used his status to ordain Moshe Alshich, who later ordained Hayyim ben Joseph Vital.

== Rabbinic scholarship flourishes ==
The 16th–17th centuries saw a resurgence of Jewish activity in Palestine. It is probable that Palestinian rabbis were involved in assisting Joseph Nasi with his plan of settling Jews in the Galilee in 1561. Palestinian rabbis were also instrumental producing a universally accepted manual of Jewish law and some of the most beautiful liturgical poems. They are also credited with developing a new method of understanding the kabbalah, especially that espoused by Palestinian mystic Isaac Luria. Palestinian scholars of this period whose Responsa merit mention are:

- Jacob Berab (1474–1546), Venice, 1663.
- Levi ibn Habib (1480?–1545), Venice, 1565; Lemberg, 1865.
- Moses di Trani (1505–85), Venice, 1629; Lemberg, 1861.
- Joseph di Trani, Constantinople, 1641; Venice, 1645; Lemberg, 1861.
- Joseph Karo (1488–1575), Lemberg, 1811 and another collection titled Abkath Rokhel, Salonica, 1791; Leipzig, 1859.
- Joseph ben David ibn Leb (16th century), vols. 1–3, Constantinople, 1560–73; vol. 4, Kure Tshesme, 1595, Furth, 1692; the complete work in 4 vols., Amsterdam, 1726.
- Moses Alshech (16th century), Venice, 1605, Slonek (Berlin), 1681? Lemberg, 1889.
- Yom-Tov ben Moses Zahalon (1557–1638?), Venice, 1694.

Joseph Karo's comprehensive guide to Jewish law, the Shulchan Aruch, was considered so authoritative that the variant customs of German-Polish Jewry were merely added as supplement glosses. Some of the most celebrated hymns were written in Safed by poets such as Israel Najara and Solomon Alkabetz. The town was also a centre of Jewish mysticism, notable kabbalists included Moses Cordovero and the German-born Naphtali Hertz ben Jacob Elhanan. During the 17th century, a messianic fervour developed and spread. Several scholars publicised a novel interpretation of a passage in the Zohar, an ancient mystical text, which predicted that the Messiah would arrive in 1648. A special prayer composed by Palestinian rabbis was sent to all Jewish communities worldwide to induce the Messianic advent. It asked for God to restore the Davidic monarchy and requested the "cultivation of peace and good will" among one another.

The writings of later Palestinian rabbis are still used by contemporary authorities. 20th-century Immanuel Jakobovits, Chief Rabbi of the United Hebrew Congregations of the Commonwealth, cites 17th-century Moses ibn Habib in his halachic work on medical ethics.

== Charitable activism ==
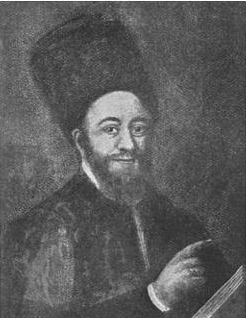
Raphael H. I. Carregal, 18th-century Palestinian emissary

Palestinian rabbis were actively involved in raising funds for their communities in the Holy Land. One of the earliest records of this is an 11th-century appeal made to the Jews of Fostat from the Gaon Solomon the Younger. It requested funds to help alleviate the heavy tax burden placed upon the Jews of Jerusalem. By the 17th century, the dispatchment of a meshulach had become a permanent feature of the yishuv. A prominent Palestinian rabbi of the 18th century was Raphael Hayyim Isaac Carigal (1733–1777) of Hebron. He travelled to many countries as an emissary of the Four Holy Cities. In 1755, Palestinian rabbi Chaim Joseph David Azulai visited London to collect funds for the Hebron yeshiva. The first Palestinian emissary to visit North America was Sephardi rabbi Moses Malki of Safed who arrived in 1759. In the early 1820s, Palestinian rabbis on missions to Amsterdam, London and New York established charitable societies that solicited funds for Jewish communities in the Holy Land. In 1846, Rabbi Yehiel Cohen of Jerusalem pleaded with the Jews of New York to send support the Jews of Hebron who were suffering from famine. In Morocco during the late 19th-century, legends evolved around tombs which supposedly belonged to Palestinian rabbis who had died there while on their fundraising missions. One such venerated Palestinian saint was 18th-century Rabbi Amram ben Diwan, whose tomb in Ouazzane is the site of annual pilgrimage. In 1839, Palestinian rabbis concerned with the economic problems of their communities, petitioned philanthropist Moses Montefiore for assistance in helping them develop the land for agricultural production. Yet charitable activity on the part of Palestinian rabbis was not limited to Palestine alone. In 1943, in conjunction with the American Vaad Hatzalah Rescue Committee, a committee of distinguished Palestinian rabbis and roshei yeshiva tried to send relief packages to Torah scholars in the Soviet Union.

== Land of Israel Rabbinate ==
A list of List of Sephardi chief rabbis of the Land of Israel exists from the mid-17th century onwards. They were known as the Rishon LeZion (lit. "First to Zion"), and Moshe ben Yonatan Galante, one of the leading Talmudic scholars in Jerusalem who died in 1689, was the first chief rabbi officially recognised by the Ottoman sultan.

In 1918, the chairman of the Zionist Commission, Chaim Weizmann, attempted to create a unified religious authority for the country. In April 1920, an assembly in Jerusalem of around 60 rabbis failed to agree on the matter. In 1920, Herbert Samuel, 1st Viscount Samuel, high commissioner of the British governance of Mandatory Palestine, again convened a committee to consider the creation of a united Chief Rabbinate. While Yosef Chaim Sonnenfeld opposed the idea because it included laymen and secularists, Abraham Isaac Kook responded with great enthusiasm. He saw it as an opportunity to introduce order and discipline into society and also viewed the establishment of the Palestinian Rabbinate as the fulfilment of the prophetic promise. In 1921, Kook was appointed the first Palestinian chief rabbi for the Ashkenazi community, a position which he held until he died in 1935. Yitzhak HaLevi Herzog succeeded him as Chief Rabbi of the Land of Israel, until the State of Israel was created in 1948.

== See also ==
- Ezras Torah Fund for Relief of European and Palestinian Rabbis
- Palestinian Jews

== Bibliography ==
- Steinsaltz, Adin (2006). The essential Talmud. Basic Books. ISBN 0-465-08273-4.
- Sharfman, I. Harold (1988). The first rabbi: origins of conflict between Orthodox & Reform : Jewish polemic warfare in pre-Civil War America : a biographical history. Pangloss Press. ISBN 0-934710-15-5.
- Gilis, Ya'akov. (1978). Encyclopedia le-Toldot Hachmei Eretz Yisrael (Encyclopedia of the sages of the Land of Israel). Mosad ha-Rav Kook.
- Catherine Hezser (1997). The social structure of the rabbinic movement in Roman Palestine. Mohr Siebeck. ISBN 9783161467974.
- Alex Carmel; Peter Schäfer; Yossi Ben-Artzi (1990). The Jewish settlement in Palestine, 634-1881. ISBN 9783882264791.
- Y. Barnay (1992). The Jews in Palestine in the eighteenth century: under the patronage of the Istanbul Committee of Officials for Palestine. University of Alabama Press. ISBN 9780817305727.
- Ben-Zion Rosenfeld (2009). Torah Centers and Rabbinic Activity in Palestine 70-400 C.E: History and Geographic Distribution. BRILL. ISBN 978-9004178380.
- Stuart S. Miller (2006). Sages and commoners in late antique ʼEreẓ Israel: a philological inquiry into local traditions in Talmud Yerushalmi. Mohr Siebeck. ISBN 9783161485671.
- Ephraim E. Urbach (1968). Class-Status and Leadership in the World of the Palestinian Sages. Proceedings of the Israel Academy of Sciences and Humanities 2.
