= Modern attempts to revive the Sanhedrin =

Modern attempts to revive the Sanhedrin refer to the efforts from 1538 to the present aimed at renewing the Sanhedrin, which was the high court and legislative authority for Jews before it was dissolved by Roman Emperor Constantius II in 358. Although 358 was the year of the proclamation, no documentation exists regarding when the Sanhedrin actually dissolved.

Modern attempts to revive the Sanhedrin rely on the opinion of Maimonides (1135–1204), who proposed a mechanism by which semikhah and the Sanhedrin could be reestablished. Several attempts have been made to implement Maimonides's recommendations. In 1538, Rabbi Jacob Berab of Safed attempted to restore the traditional form of semikhah and ordained several other rabbis, including Yosef Karo. However, this attempt was controversial, and the chain of ordination died out after several generations. Several later attempts have been made, including one attempt in 2004, which established a full Sanhedrin of over 70 members. However, its validity has not been widely accepted.

The relevance of the Sanhedrin in Jewish law cannot be minimized: it was the only judicial body in the Land of Israel putatively having the statutory and constitutional authority to render a verdict of capital punishment to would-be offenders, and it was solely authorized to send forth the Jewish people to a voluntary war.

== The dissolution of the classical Sanhedrin ==
By the end of the Second Temple period, the Sanhedrin achieved its quintessential position, legislating on all aspects of Jewish religious and political life within the parameters laid down by Biblical and Rabbinic tradition. After the destruction of the Second Temple in 70 CE, the Sanhedrin was re-established in Yavne. It later then moved to a succession of different locations, finally (in 220) to Tiberias. During the presidency of Gamaliel IV (270–290), due to Roman persecution, it dropped the name Sanhedrin; and its authoritative decisions were subsequently issued under the name of Beth HaMidrash.

In the year 363, the emperor Julian (r. 355–363 CE), an apostate from Christianity, ordered the Temple rebuilt. However, this attempt failed with Julian's death. As a reaction against Julian's pro-Jewish stance, the later emperor Theodosius I (r. 379–395 CE) forbade the Sanhedrin to assemble and declared ordination illegal. Capital punishment was prescribed for any Rabbi who received ordination, as well as complete destruction of the town where the ordination occurred. Gamaliel VI (400–425) was the Sanhedrin's last president. With the death of this patriarch, executed by Theodosius II for erecting new synagogues contrary to the imperial decree, use of the title Nasi, the last remains of the ancient Sanhedrin, became illegal after 425.

== Possible early attempts at revival ==
There are records of what may have been of attempts to reform the Sanhedrin in Arabia, in Jerusalem under the Caliph Umar ibn Khattab, and in Babylon (Iraq), but none of these attempts were given any attention by Rabbinic authorities and little information is available about them.

== Maimonides' semicha by consensus ==
Maimonides (1138–1204) was one of the greatest rabbis of the Middle Ages. Influenced by the rationalist school of thought and his general preference for a natural (as opposed to miraculous) redemption for the Jewish people, Maimonides wrote that in every generation the Jewish people are religiously required to set up a Sanhedrin and courts of law. Faced with the absence of classical semicha (Biblical ordination), which is a prerequisite for serving on the Sanhedrin, Maimonides tentatively proposed a rationalist method for reestablishing semichah:

It appears to me [Maimonides] that if all the sages of the Land of Israel consent to appoint dayanim (judges) and grant them semichah (ordination), they have the law of musmachim and they can judge penalty cases and are authorized to grant semichah to others [thus restoring Biblical ordination].

If so, why did the sages bemoan [the loss of] semichah? So that the judgment of penalty cases wouldn't disappear from among Israel because Jews are so spread out that it's not possible to get their consent [to authorize a dayan]. If someone were to receive semichah from someone who already has semichah, then he does not require their consent – he may judge penalty cases for everyone since he received semichah from beit din (rabbinical court). However, this matter requires a final decision.

The wording of this teaching is vague and tentative and leaves several points open. Firstly, it opens with "It appears to me" and ends with "this matter requires a final decision". Secondly, it is not specified what is meant by "consent". Thirdly, it leaves open as to who are "all the sages of the Land of Israel" and lastly—although not apparent here—how literally the word "all" must be taken. These questions led to significant debate within Rabbinic circles, from those who completely disregarded this teaching to others who differed on its meaning.

Maimonides' ruling was accepted as definitive Jewish law by Rabbi Yosef Karo (1488-1575), author of the Shulchan Aruch. Similarly, Rabbi Yisrael of Shklov (1770-1839), a leading disciple of the Vilna Gaon, wrote in the name of the Gaon that there is no need to wait for the messiah to come before forming a Sanhedrin.

However this conclusion has been disputed by other rabbis, including Nahmanides (Ramban, 1194–1270), Rabbi Levi Ibn Chaviv (the Ralbach, c. 1480 – c. 1545), Rabbi David ben Solomon ibn Abi Zimra (the Radvaz, 1479–1573), and Rabbi Avrohom Yeshaya Karelitz (the Chazon Ish, 1878-1953), who rejected the possibility of forming a Sanhedrin before the messiah comes.

A Transcription of Maimonides’ View on Reestablishing the Sanhedrin

Semīkhat zekeinīm [= the ordination of elders], this refers to the appointment of the judges, while the allusion to this is in what was said (Numbers 27:23), ‘and he laid his hands on him and commanded him.’ We, however, do not need the actual laying on of hands. Rather, the man who is worthy of being appointed [judge], the court who appoints him says to him: ‘You, rabbi so-and-so, lo! You are ordained, and you are permitted to judge cases of monetary laws.’ That man then becomes ordained, and he is [thereafter] called a judge, and may judge in all judiciary matters. This thing, however, has no legal basis except only in the Land of Israel, [for] they have said that there is no ordination (semikha) outside the Land of Israel (Talmud, Sanhedrin 14a), but both he that is appointed and those appointing him are required to be together in the Land of Israel. Whenever a man has received ordination in the Land of Israel, he is authorized to adjudicate in laws relating to [biblical] fines, even outside the Land of Israel, since there is a general rule with us that states that the [duties of the] Sanhedrin apply in the Land of Israel and outside the Land of Israel, as shall be explained in what follows. But as for whether the three judges who ordain are required themselves to have been previously ordained, and only afterwards is it possible for them to ordain another person, there is in this matter a doubt. However, it appears from the Talmud (Sanhedrin 14a) that the greatest among them needs to have been ordained, and that he is to be joined by another two [judges], while he appoints whoever he wishes. I am of the opinion, however, that if there is general consensus of all the students and rabbinic sages to appoint a man in the seat of learning, that is to say, to make him [their] head, and on condition that this is done in the Land of Israel, just as we have premised, behold, the seat of learning would be established unto that same man, and he will be ordained, and he can then ordain another person in this manner, whosoever he wishes. [Such is my view], since if you do not say so, the reality of a Great rabbinic court will never be realized, seeing that each of them requires to be ordained [from successive generations of ordained judges] without having befallen them a [single] doubtful case. Behold, God has already promised [to do these things] at their return [to the land], by saying (Isaiah 1:26), ‘And I will restore your judges as at the beginning.’ Now, unless you should say that the Messiah will appoint them, even though they are not ordained [from successive generations of ordained judges], lo! That [view] is rejected, since we have already explained in the beginning of this, our book, that the Messiah will not add [aught] to the Torah, nor will he detract from it, whether it is the Written law or the Oral law. I am of the opinion that the Sanhedrin will return before the advent of the Messiah, and this will be one of the signs, [for] he said (Isaiah 1:26), ‘And I will restore your judges as at the beginning and your counselors as at the start; Afterward you shall be called the city of righteousness.’ This will happen, without doubt, when God makes right the hearts of men and their benevolent deeds are multiplied and their desire for God and His law will increase, and their integrity will pervade [all places] before the coming of the Messiah, just as it has been explained in the scriptural verses.

== Rabbi Berab's attempt ==
In 1538 Rabbi Jacob Berab attempted to restore the traditional form of semikhah. His goal was to unify the scattered Jewish communities through the re-establishment of the Sanhedrin. Numerous scholars, including Professors Jacob Katz and Robert Cover, have authored articles that critically examine the efforts to renew ordination in Safed, analyzing them from both historical and legal-halachic perspectives.

Rabbi Yakov Berav was born in Spain. Evidence of the great respect is afforded by the following lines of Rabbi Abraham Gavison in Omer ha-Shikchah: "Say not that the lamp of the Law no longer burns in Israel! Jacob Berab has come back! once more he sojourns among us!" In 1533 he became Rabbi at Cairo; and several years after he seems to have finally settled in Safed, which then contained the largest and most learned Jewish community in the Land of Israel.

After the Spanish expulsion, many Jews remained in Spain, practicing their Judaism in secret, while publicly appearing to be Christians. Thousands of these Marrano Jews eventually escaped to areas where they could practice their religion with relative freedom, yet they were haunted by the sins they had committed in previous years. As chief Rabbi of Safed, Rabbi Jacob Berab proposed the creation of Jewish courts that would carry out the punishment of malqot, lashes, which releases someone from the punishment of kareth (Mishnah Makos 23a). But in order to create these Jewish courts, classical ordination had to be reinstituted.

=== Renewal of semicha ===
For a year, Rabbi Jacob Berab discussed the issues of re-establishment institution of semicha with the scholars of Safed. After much discussion the scholars at Safed came to the conclusion that Maimonides' view was correct, and that there was a pressing need to re-establish the Sanhedrin. In 1538 twenty-five Rabbis met in an assembly at Safed and ordained Rabbi Jacob Berab, giving him the right to ordain others who would then form a Sanhedrin. After sending a delegation to Jerusalem, Rabbi Jacob Berab expounded on Shabbat before all the scholars of Safed the halachic basis of the re-establishment of semicha and its implications, with an intent to dispel any remaining doubts. On hearing of this event, approximately two hundred scholars, most of the scholars in Land of Israel, also expressed their consent. To obtain the good-will of the scholars of Jerusalem, Rabbi Jacob Berab sent Rabbi Shelomo Hazzan to inform them of the reinstitution of semicha and to obtain their approval. He extended semicha to the chief Rabbi at Jerusalem, Levi ibn Habib, (Ralbach).

=== The dispute ===
The Ralbach however rejected the semicha. He considered it an insult to his dignity and to the dignity of Jerusalem that so important a change should be effected without consultation of the scholars of Jerusalem. Rabbi Moshe deCastro of Jerusalem also expressed doubts over the applicability of semicha. Because of this opposition some of the scholars of Safed also began to entertain doubts. Rabbi Jacob Berab again assembled the scholars of Safed, and reviewed the halachic basis for re-establishment of semicha. Rabbi Yosef Karo and others sent a treatise Maaseh Beit Din to the scholars of Jerusalem explaining the basis for semicha and protesting their opposition to its re-establishment. In the course of time, the Ralbach put his objections to Rabbi Jacob Berab's semicha in writing, involving additional scholars in the dispute. In response Rabbi Jacob Berab composed and distributed Iggeret Hasemicha to settle any halachic doubts. The dispute lasted for a year. In general the scholars outside of Land of Israel did not get involved at this stage in the dispute, with the exception of the Radbaz.

The Ralbach's objections centered around the following points:

1. The re-establishment of semicha would cause the speeding up of redemption, which is not permitted.
2. Maimonides closing words, "This matter requires a final decision" shows that he was not fully decided on this ruling. Since Maimonides was uncertain and Nahmanides was certain, the law follows Nahmanides.
3. The role of Sanhedrin had to be complete, meaning that the Hebrew calendar had to immediately change, which could cause division among the Jewish people
4. Even if Maimonides was correct, because the scholars of Jerusalem were not present the election was invalid.

Rabbi Jacob Berab countered with the following points:

1. Re-establishment semicha does not constitute interference with the process of redemption, rather it is simply the fulfillment of a positive mitzvah.
2. Maimonides' closing words refer to a different legal matter.
3. There was no problem leaving the Jewish calendar unchanged.
4. The most learned scholars lived in Safed and that was sufficient; in Jewish law the word "all" means the "main part". (The Ralbach did not differ with Rabbi Jacob Berab on this point, only he objected that "all" must include the scholars of Jerusalem. He did not claim that every scholar in all of Land of Israel should be present in the assembly).

In his treatise Maaseh Beit Din, Rabbi Yosef Karo explained Maimonides' principle of "all". There he writes that Maimonides meant that if one Rabbi is willing to defer to the knowledge and wisdom of another Rabbi - those lesser rabbis are already included to the greater rabbis and need not be included in the count of "all" (meaning that the scholars of Jerusalem did not need to be included in the election process). To further show that he held that this opinion, he accepted the Semikha of Rabbi Berab, and passed it on for several generations.

=== Conclusion ===
It is known that Rabbi Yosef Karo and Rabbi Moses of Trani were two of the four men ordained by Rabbi Yakov Beirav. The others are assumed to be Rabbi Abraham Shalom and Rabbi Israel de Curial and/or Rabbi Yoshiyahu Pinto. After weighing the objections of Ralbach, Rabbi Yosef Karo chose to be part of the Mahari Berab's attempt to reinstate the Sanhedrin in his time. This is the source for the acronym MaRaN, which stands for the words "ordained by two hundred Rabbis" (Mataim Rabanan Nismakh). Scholars never criticized Rabbi Yosef Karo for this decision. Though there were arguments over many years about the authority of the Shulchan Aruch until it became universally accepted, yet nowhere does one criticize Rabbi Yosef Karo for the fact that he received semicha from Rabbi Yakov Beirav and transmitted it onward. Rabbi Yosef Karo is known to have used his semicha to ordain Rabbi Moses Alsheich, who in turn, ordained Rabbi Hayyim Vital. Thus semicha can be traced for at least four generations. Rabbi Yosef Karo, in his commentary the Beit Yosef (Choshen Mishpat 295), answered the objections of the Ralbach by recording as definitive Jewish law the Maimonides' opinion that semicha can be renewed by consensus.

However this view is not shared by all modern rabbis, as Rabbi Yirmiyohu Kaganoff writes: Although Rav Yosef Karo had received this semicha and ordained Rav Moshe Alshich, it is not clear he utilized the semicha in any other way. Nowhere does he refer to a renewal of semicha, and furthermore, numerous places in Shulchan Aruch would be written differently if its author assumed that a beis din of semuchim existed today. In all these places, he assumes that no beis din today exists that is authorized to paskin on the laws of penalties and punishments... Although Rav Moshe Alshich ordained Rav Hayyim Vital (Birkei Yosef, Choshen Mishpat 1:7), who was renowned as the primary disciple of the Arizal, the semicha trail appears to end at this point. There is no indication of anyone continuing the semicha project after this time... according to Rabbi Kaganoff, "we can assume that the psak of the Ralbach and Radbaz was accepted that we should not introduce semicha on our own."

In 1541, Karo succeeded Berab and he perpetuated the tradition by ordaining Moshe Alshich, Elisha Gallico and Jacob Berab II. In the 1590s, Alshich ordained Hayyim Vital, and between the years 1594 and 1599, Jacob Berab II ordained seven more scholars: Moses Galante, Elazar Azikri, Moses Berab (Jacob's brother), Abraham Gabriel, Yom Tov Tzahalon, Hiyya Rofe and Jacob Abulafia.

Berab erred in not first obtaining the approval of the chief rabbis in Jerusalem, which led to an objection to having a Sanhedrin at that time. This was not an objection to the semikhah, but to reinstituting a Sanhedrin. Levi ibn Habib, the chief rabbi in Jerusalem, wrote that when the nascent Sanhedrin took the authority of a Sanhedrin upon itself, it had to fix the calendar immediately. However, by delaying in this matter, it invalidated itself. Rabbi David ben Solomon ibn Abi Zimra (Radbaz) of Egypt was consulted, but when Berab died in 1542 the renewed form of semikhah gradually ground to a halt.

== More recent attempts ==
=== Attempt by Rabbi Yisroel Shklover, 1830 ===
In the 1830s, Rav Yisroel of Shklov, one of the leading disciples of the Vilna Gaon who had settled in Jerusalem, made another attempt to restart semikhah. Rav Yisroel was interested in organizing a Sanhedrin, but he accepted the ruling of Levi ibn Habib and David ben Solomon ibn Abi Zimra that we cannot create semikhah by ourselves.

At the time the Turkish Empire was crumbling, and losing wars against Russia, Prussia, Austria and others. In attempt to modernize, the Turkish Empire opened itself up to more and more Western "advisors". For the first time the Arabian Peninsula and the Yemen was opened up to westerners. Scientists and Sociologists were convinced that in the Yemen lay communities that had been cut off and isolated from the western world for centuries. At the time, leading European scientific journals seriously considered that the remnants of the "Ten Tribes" would actually be found in the Yemen.

Rav Yisroel of Shklov, influenced both by this rush of scientific thought and interested in utilizing a suggestion of the Radbaz of receiving semikhah from one of the "Ten Tribes", specifically Reuben and Gad. Rav Yisroel charted out where he thought the Bnei Reuven were probably located, and sent an emissary, Rav Pinchas Baruch, to locate them. Unfortunately, Rav Baruch did not succeed in locating the shevet of Reuven and he was either killed or died while attending to the medical needs of poor Yemenite villagers.

In the end, no remnant was found, however the responses involved in this shed light on the Vilna Gaon's position that it was permissible to attempt to re-establish the Sanhedrin.

An interesting point of Jewish Law arises in that Rav Yisroel raised the question how could the Tribe of Reuben have kept the semikhah alive, since they were outside the Land of Israel and the semikhah can be granted only in the Land of Israel. He answered that since this tribe had been distant from the rest of the Jewish people before this ruling had been accepted, there is no reason to assume that they accepted this ruling, and there was a chance that they were still keeping the institution of semikhah alive.

=== Attempt by Rabbi Aharon Mendel haCohen, 1901 ===
Rabbi Mendel collected the approval of approximately 500 leading rabbis in favor of the renewal of semikhah according to the view of Maimonides. His involvement in the founding of Agudath Israel and the breakout of World War I distracted him from implementing this plan.

The new Sanhedrin bases its use of phones, fax and regular mail rather than physically assembling "all the scholars of the Land of Israel" on the rabbinical responsa surrounding this attempt.

=== Attempt by Rabbi Zvi Kovsker, 1940 ===
Rabbi Zvi Kovsker came to the Holy Land from Soviet Russia. Seeing the condition of Jews in the years leading up to World War II, he undertook an effort to contact and work with many rabbinic leaders in the Holy Land towards getting their approval for the renewal of semikhah, and the reestablishment of a Sanhedrin, as an authentic government for the Jewish people (this was before the establishment of the State of Israel).

His efforts to lobby the Rabbinic leaders were the model for twenty years of groundwork and discussions by the organizers of the new Sanhedrin.

=== Attempt by Rabbi Yehudah Leib Maimon, 1949 ===
In 1948, with the establishment of the modern State of Israel, the idea of restoring the traditional form of semikhah and reestablishing a new "Sanhedrin" became popular among some within the religious Zionist community. Rabbi Yehuda Leib Maimon, Israel's first minister of religious affairs, promoted this idea in a series of articles in the Religious Zionist periodicals "Sinai" and "Hatzofeh," later gathered together in monograph form as "Renewing the Sanhedrin in our New State." Rabbi Maimon proposed turning the Israeli Rabbinate into a Sanhedrin. A small number of religious Zionist rabbis of Modern Orthodox Judaism's Rabbinical Council of America voiced support for this idea; some rabbis within Conservative Judaism entertained the idea as a potentially positive development. However, most secular Jews, most Haredim, and most non-Orthodox Jews did not approve of this goal. The perceived subordinate position to the government of Israel was compared to Napoleon's Sanhedrin, and led to strong vocal opposition by most Haredi rabbis. Israel's Chief Ashkenazi rabbi at the time, Yitzhak HaLevi Herzog, was hesitant to support this goal, and the idea eventually died away.

=== Attempt in Israel in 2004 ===
The most recent attempt occurred in 2004, when a group of seventy-one rabbis claiming to represent varied communities in Israel undertook a ceremony in Tiberias, where the original Sanhedrin was disbanded. That group claimed to re-establish the body, based on the proposal of Maimonides and the Jewish legal rulings of Rabbi Yosef Karo. As of June 2023, that effort is officially ongoing, supported mainly by The Temple Institute, although practically defunct.

The current attempt to re-establish the Sanhedrin is the sixth in recent history.

== See also ==
- Sanhedrin
- Semicha
- List of national legal systems
