= Jewish textile industry in 16th-century Safed =

Jewish economic history

The textile industry became an important feature of 16th-century Safed, Ottoman Galilee (at the time within Damascus Eyalet of the Ottoman Empire), following an influx of Jewish immigration in late 15th and early 16th centuries. Run as a Jewish monopoly, textile manufacturing became the community's main source of income. The industry declined toward the end of the century.

== Jewish refugees settle in Safed ==
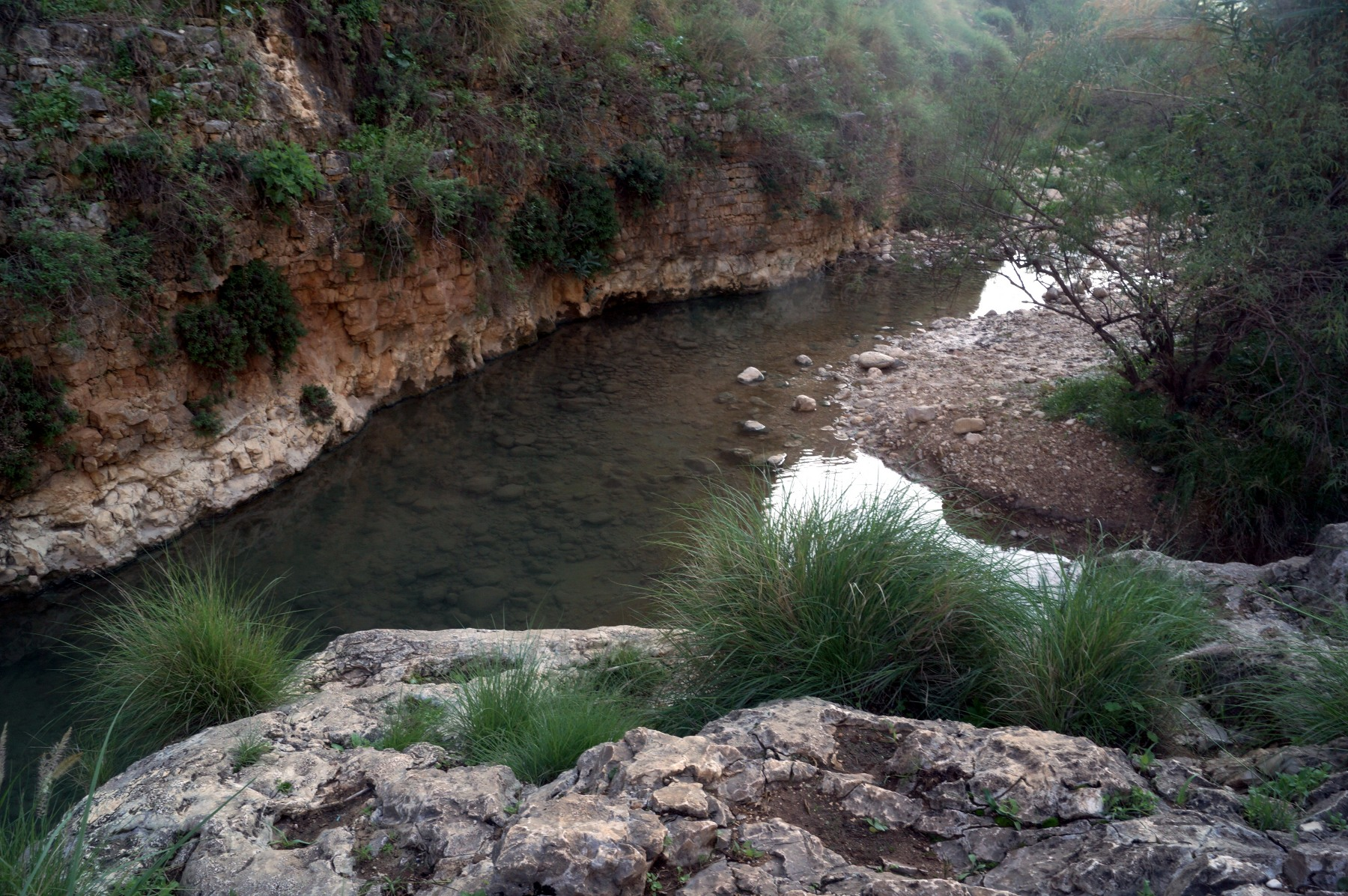
Nahal Amud

After the expulsion of the Jews from Spain in 1492, many sought refuge in Ottoman-controlled lands. They used the opportunity to introduce the production of high-quality wool which they had manufactured in Spain and soon Jewish merchants became significantly involved in the wool trade in nearly all parts of the Ottoman Empire. Many made their way to Safed, which with its numerous springs and nearby streams, had the perfect geological conditions for the manufacture of wool-cloth.

In 1522, Safed's Jewish population stood at three hundred families. The influx of Spanish refugees transformed the town into an international hub of fabric production and by the end of the century, the number of Jewish families in Safed had increased to at least 20,000.

== Processing ==
Foreign wool was imported through the ports of Sidon and Acre to be processed and the finished goods were exported abroad, including to Syria and Egypt. The 16th century saw textiles becoming the principal regional industry and in Safed it was the main source of income for the Jewish community who maintained a monopoly on the trade. David de-Rossi, an Italian Jewish merchant who visited in 1535, was amazed to witness the enormous growth of the tailoring trade and claimed that over 15,000 suits had been manufactured in Safed in that year alone.

The Jews were active in all the stages of production: dyeing, spinning and weaving. The women were involved in the spinning the raw, short-fibered wool at home while the weaving was performed in workshops. Scholars residing in Safed who were involved in the business included Rabbi Moses Galante who owned a factory and Rabbis Moses Berab, Menachem HaBavli and his brother Reuben who were wool dyers.

Buildings containing special mills were used to cleanse the cloth. By using water-powered mechanical technology in the fulling process, the Jews had introduced a modern and efficient manner of textile production in to the region.

Production was not limited to Safed and its environs; other centres existed in Nablus and Jerusalem. During the 1560s and 1570s Joseph Nasi initiated the cultivation of mulberry trees in Tiberias for the production of silk clothing "of the kind worn in Venice" and Merino sheep were to be raised for their wool.

== Economic and social consequences ==
Safed's economic growth during the period was chiefly due to the booming textile trade. The Jews, heavily involved in the various stages of manufacture and trade, were levied with substantial taxes which provided a significant boost to the country’s economy. When 1,000 of the most affluent Jews were faced with deportation to Cyprus in 1576, it was argued by the local revenue authorities that Safed would be "on the verge of ruin" and the "Treasury of Damascus will suffer a great loss" if, among other things, the "stamp duty on broadcloth, customs on felt and the tax farming of the dye-houses would be discontinued".

The success of the trade resulted in the growth of Safed's Jewish community and consequently had implications for the country's religious establishment. Levi ibn Habib, the Chief Rabbi of Jerusalem, felt it was Safed's material prosperity which had allowed Jacob Berab and his group of rabbis to feel they could challenge Jerusalem's historic supremacy and attempt to revive ordination in Safed. He wrote sarcastically: "Is it because of the great quantity of clothes that are manufactured in Safed that they presume to be the leaders of the Jewish people?"

Towards the end of the century the industry faced a sharp decline. Cheaper woollen goods from western Europe began to flood the markets. Safed's labourers could not withstand the competition and when the merchants relocated, Safed's Jewish community itself began to decline.

== Religious consequences ==
The economic and demographic peak of Jewish 16th-century Safed led to a renaissance of mystical Judaism and propulsed the city to its position as one of the Four Holy Cities of modern Judaism. The process was led by Moshe Cordovero, Joseph Karo and, to a large degree, by Isaac Luria, after which Lurianic Kabbalah is named.
