= Abraham Gabriel =

16th to 17th-century Palestinian rabbi

- אברהם גבריאל

Personal life
- Born: Italy (Probable)
- Notable work: Censura prefixed to various Hebrew works
- Known for: Disciple of Isaac Luria, leader of the Italian congregation in Safed
- Occupation: Rabbi, legal arbiter, emissary

Religious life
- Religion: Judaism
- Denomination: Kabbalist

Senior posting
- Teacher: Isaac Luria

Abraham Gabriel (Hebrew: אברהם גבריאל; 16th to 17th-century) was a Palestinian rabbi of probable Italian origin who lived at Safed. He was a disciple of the kabbalist Isaac Luria and is mentioned in Hayyim Vital's Book of Visions. Gabriel was ordained by Jacob Berab II in 1594 and served as a legal arbiter on the Safed beth din (law court). He also acted as leader of the Italian congregation of the city. In 1603 he travelled to Sidon as an emissary for Safed. His censura were prefixed to various Hebrew works published at that period, including in the She'elot ve-Teshuvot of Yom Tov Tzahalon (Venice 1694).
