= Solomon Alkabetz =

Sephardic Jewish poet, kabbalist and rabbi (1505–1584)

Solomon Alkabetz שלמה אלקבץ
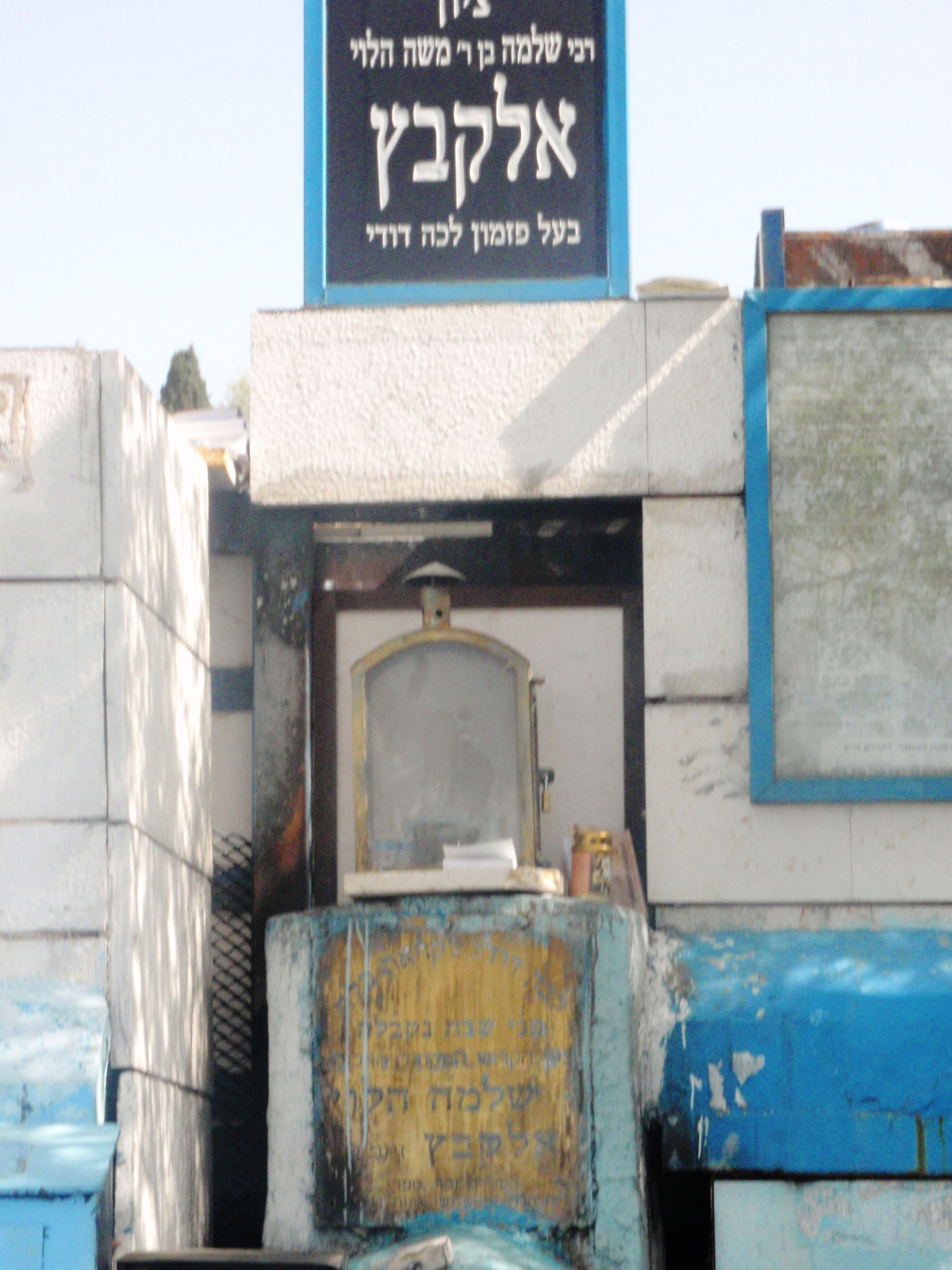
- Alkabetz's grave in Safed

Personal life
- Born: c. 1505 Salonica, Ottoman Empire
- Died: 1584 Safed, Ottoman Empire
- Buried: Safed Old Jewish Cemetery

Religious life
- Religion: Judaism

Solomon ha-Levi Alkabetz (Note: Also spelt Alqabitz, Alqabes) (Hebrew: שלמה הלוי אלקבץ, romanized: Shlomo ha-Levi Alkabetz; c. 1505 – 1584) was a rabbi, kabbalist and poet. He is perhaps best known for his composition of the song Lekha Dodi.

== Biography ==
Solomon Alkabetz was likely born around 1505 into a Sephardic family in the Ottoman city of Salonica. the son of Moses Alkabetz. He studied Torah under Joseph Taitazak. In 1529, he married the daughter of Yitzhak Cohen, a wealthy householder living in his hometown. Alkabetz gave his father-in-law a copy of his newly completed work Manot ha-Levi. He settled in Adrianúpolis, where he wrote Bet Hashem, Avotot Ahava, Ayelet Ahavim and Brit HaLevi. He dedicated this latter work to his admirers in Adrianople. His students included Samuel ben Isaac de Uçeda, author of the Midrash Shmuel on the Pirkei Avot, and Abraham ben Mordecai Galante, author of Yareach Yakar on the Zohar. His circle included Moshe Alshich and Joseph Karo, as well as his famous brother-in-law Moses ben Jacob Cordovero.

Following the practice described in the Zohar of reciting biblical passages known as the "Tikkun'" on the night of Shavuot, Rabbi Solomon and Rabbi Joseph Karo stayed awake all that night reading. During the recitation of the required texts, Rabbi Karo had a mystical experience: The Shekhinah appeared as a maggid, praising the circle and telling them to move to the Land of Israel. When they stayed up again on the second night of Shavuot, the Shekhinah was adamant about their moving to the Land of Israel. Alkabetz recorded the account. Before moving to the Land of Israel, he made a sermon passionately discussing the rebuilding of the Temple in Jerusalem with messianic enthusiasm.

He settled in Safed aged thirty, likely in 1535.

In Safed, he made significant contributions to the development of Kabbalah, serving as a mystical instructor to Moses Cordovero, who later became his brother-in-law and one of Safed’s most esteemed Kabbalists before the arrival of Isaac Luria. Alkabets was deeply involved in the spiritual life of the city, exemplified by his authorship of "Lekhah Dodi," a liturgical song sung during the Shabbat service. This influence persisted even as Lurianic Kabbalah, promoted by Haim Vital and Israel Sarug, eventually eclipsed Cordoverian Kabbalah in popularity and status among Kabbalists.

He is buried in the Old Safed Cemetery.

== Views and opinions ==
His works written in Adrianupolis center on the holiness of the people of Israel, the Land of Israel, and the specialness of the mitzvot. Alkabetz accepts the tradition that Esther was married to Mordecai before being taken to the king's palace and becoming queen and even continues her relationship with Mordechai after taking up her royal post. The view of midrash articulated by Alkabetz and other members of the school of Joseph Taitatsak represents an extension of the view of the authority of the oral law and midrash halakha to aggadah and thus leads to the sanctification and near canonization of aggadic expansions of biblical narrative.

== Published works ==
=== In print ===
- Ayalet Ahavim (completed 1532, published 1552) on Song of Songs.
- Brit HaLevi (1563), a kabbalistic commentary on the Haggadah.
- Lekha Dodi (1579), a mystical hymn to inaugurate the Shabbat.
- Manot HaLevi (completed 1529, published 1585) on the Book of Esther.
- Or Tzadikim, a book of sermons.
- Shoresh Yishai (completed 1552, published 1561) on the Book of Ruth.

=== Manuscripts ===
- Apiryon Shlomo, Beit Hashem, Beit Tefilla, interpretations of the prayers.
- Divrei Shlomo, on the section of Scripture known as Writings.
- Lechem Shlomo, on the guidelines for the sanctification of meals, according to Kabbalah.
- Mittato shel Shlomo, on the mystical significance of sexual union.
- Naim Zemirot, on Psalms.
- Pitzei Ohev, on the Book of Job.
- Shomer Emunim, on the fundamental principles of faith.
- Sukkat Shalom, Avotot Ahavah, on the Torah.
