= Maharitz =

The following rabbis were/are known as the Maharitz:

- Yom Tov Tzahalon
- Yosef Tzvi Dushinsky (first Dushinsky rebbe)
- Yihhyah Salahh, an 18th-century Yemenite rabbi, writer of the current Baladi rite prayer book
