= Etz Chaim (book) =

1573 summary of the teachings of Isaac Luria

Etz Chaim (Hebrew: עץ חיים, "Tree of Life") is a literary work that deals with the Kabbalah. Written in 1573, the book summarises the teachings of Isaac Luria—the Arizal (1534–1572)—a rabbi and kabbalist who led a study group on Kabbalah in the city of Safed, in Ottoman Palestine.

Luria did not publish any works of his own. Etz Chaim was compiled by his student and disciple, Chaim Vital, who wrote down the lessons taught by Luria to his study group on Kabbalah.

The book talks about the divine order and the existence of things, and deals with revelation and the perception of reality by human beings. The book is named after the author, Chaim vital, and because the Tree of Life in the Book of Genesis kabbalisticaly symbolizes the secrets of the Torah, as opposed to the tree of knowledge which symbolizes the revealed parts of the Torah.

The book marks the beginning of the school of thought known as the Lurianic Kabbalah. Before Luria, Kabbalists revealed the development of reality from its origin to our world (from the understandable light). According to Rabbi Chaim Vital, Luria discovered a method to better understand this reality.

== Contents ==
Vital split the book into 8 sections ("Gates"):

1. The Writings of My Teacher (luria)
2. Introductions
3. Passages
4. Verses
5. Prayer
6. Commandments
7. Ruach Hakodesh
8. Reincarnation

This version was printed for the first time in the 2010 by Machon Ahavas Shalom. Most references to Etz Chaim refer to a different work originally called Derech Etz Chaim written later by Rabbi Meir Poppers, or to the revision of vital's work compiled by his son Rabbi Shmuel Vital. The latter incorporated the first gate into the other 7 gates, and split the 3rd gate into 2 (Passages of Shimon Bar Yochai and Passages of The Sages) to maintain the number 8. This work was printed in the 1780s and came to be known as Shmone Shearim, meaning 8 gates.

== English translations ==
The following translations are of Meir Poppers' Etz Chaim, which is a later collection from the works of Chaim Vital.

- The Tree of Life: Chayyim Vital's Introduction to the Kabbalah of Isaac Luria - The Palace of Adam Kadmon (1999, Jason Aronson) Translated by Donald Wilder Menzi and Zwe Padeh ISBN 9780765760111
  - 2nd Edition (2008, Arizal Publications) ISBN 9780979597107

This is a translation of the first volume of Etz Chaim.

- The Tree of Life (CreateSpace Independent Publishing Platform) Translated by E. Colle and H. Colle
  - Volume One: The Palace of Adam Kadmon (2015) ISBN 9781512065855
  - Volume Two: The Palace of Points (2016) ISBN 9781535259224
  - Volume Three: The Palace of Crowns and The Palace of Abba and Imma (2017) ISBN 9781979572071
  - Volume Four: The Palace of Zeir Anpin - Part One (2020) ISBN 9798606851645
- Etz Chayim: The Tree of Life (2016, David Smith) Translated by Baal Even
  - Tome 1 of 12 ISBN 9781988631035
  - Tome 2 of 12 ISBN 9781988631042
  - Tome 3 of 12 ISBN 9781988631059
  - Tome 4 of 12 ISBN 9781988631066
  - Tome 5 of 12 ISBN 9781988631073
  - Tome 6 of 12 ISBN 9781988631080
  - Tome 7 of 12 ISBN 9781988631097
  - Tome 8 of 12 ISBN 9781988631103
  - Tome 9 of 12 ISBN 9781988631110
  - Tome 10 of 12 ISBN 9781988631127
  - Tome 11 of 12 ISBN 9781988631134
  - Tome 12 of 12 ISBN 9781988631141
