= Moses Alkabetz =

16th century rabbi

Moses ha-Levi Alkabetz (Hebrew: משה הלוי אלקבץ) was a prominent rabbi of the first half of the sixteenth century. In around 1530 he officiated as dayan at Safed. He seems also to have studied the Kabbalah, since Isaac ibn Shoshan of Safed wrote a kabbalistic work for him. His son was Solomon Alkabetz of Safed.

== Sources ==
Its bibliography:

- Zunz, Z. G. p. 439
- Conforte, Ḳore ha-Dorot, p. 34a.E.
