= Samuel ben Isaac de Uçeda =

Jewish commentator and preacher

Rabbi Samuel ben Isaac de Uçeda or Shmuel de Uzeda (Hebrew: שמואל אוזידא; 1545 – 1604) was a Jewish commentator and preacher. Born in Safed, his name, Uçeda, originally was derived from the town Uceda in the archbishopric of Toledo. He was a pupil of Isaac Luria and Hayyim Vital, with whom he studied kabbalah and a friend of Rabbi Moshe Cordoviro. He became rabbi and preacher in Safed and, later, in Constantinople.

== Works ==
Samuel was the author of the following works:

- Iggeret Shemu'el (Iggeret Shmuel), a commentary and supercommentary on the Book of Ruth (published in 1557; together with the text and the commentary of Rashi, Kuru Chesme, 1597; Amsterdam, 1712; Zolkiev, 1800);
- Leḥem Dim'ah (Lekhem Dim'ah), a commentary on Lamentations, with the text and the commentary of Rashi (Venice, 1600; Amsterdam, 1710, 1715);
- Midrash Shemu'el (Midrash Shmuel), a detailed commentary on Pirkei Avot, (Venice, 1579, 1585, 1597; Cracow, 1594; Frankfort-on-the-Main, 1713). This work was his chief one, and included references to the commentaries (at that time in manuscript) of Jonah Gerondi, Meïr Abulafia, Samuel ben Meïr, Menahem Me'iri, Samuel ibn Sid, Joseph ibn Nahmias, Baruch ibn Melek, Joseph ibn Susan, Moses Almosnino, and others, most of which have since been printed.
- Midrash Shmuel on the Torah, a commentary on the Torah. This was compiled from manuscripts written by Rabbi Samuel. (New York, 2015)
- Commentaries on the Book of Esther, Isaiah, Job, and Daniel.
