= Ari Ashkenazi Synagogue =

Orthodox synagogue in Safed, Israel

Ashkenazi Ari Synagogue
- Hebrew: בית הכנסת האר"י האשכנזי
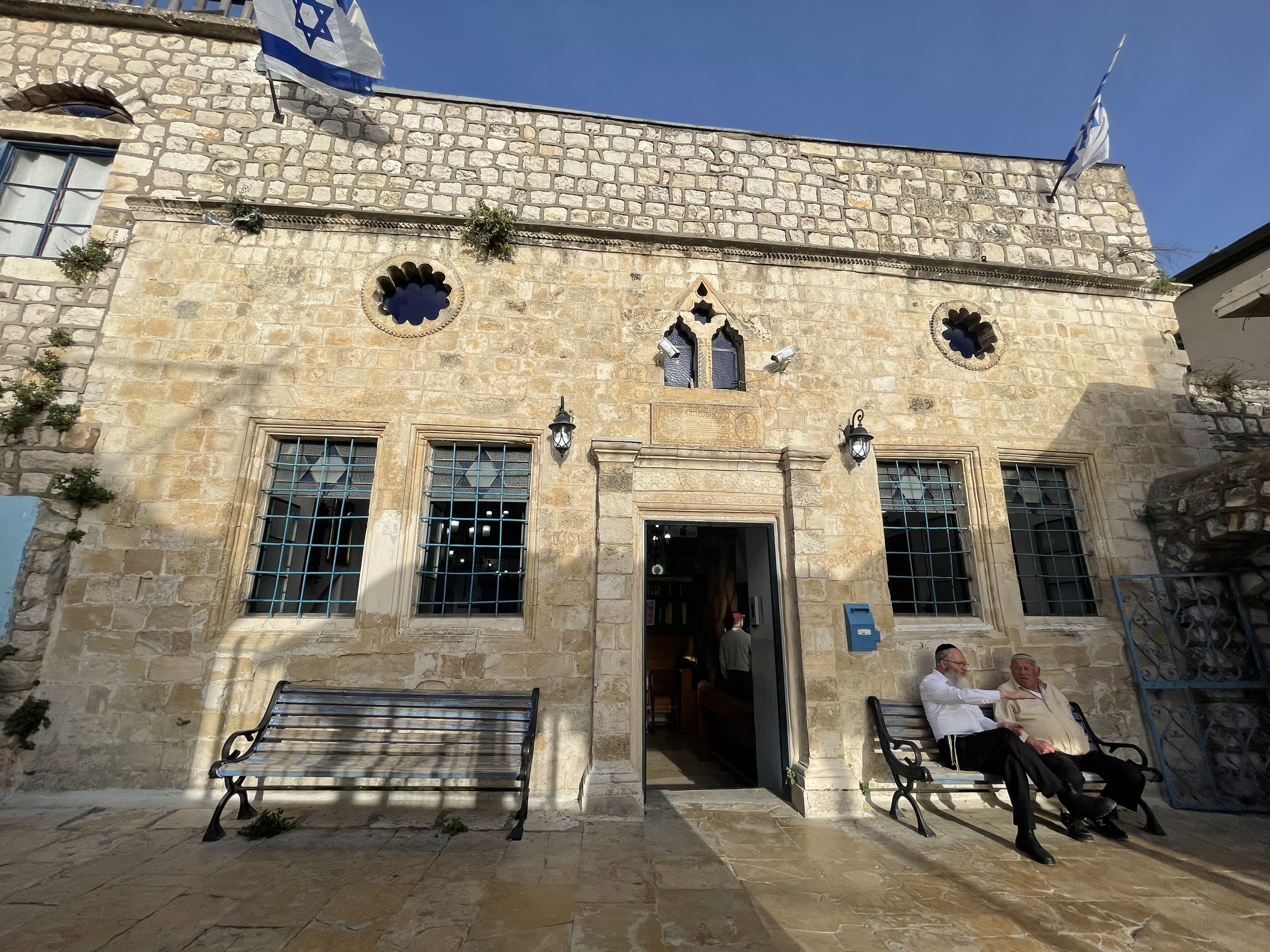
- The synagogue, in 2020

- Location of the synagogue in the northeast of the Northern District

Religion
- Affiliation: Orthodox Judaism
- Rite: Kabbalah; Nusach Ashkenaz
- Status: Active

Location
- Location: Israel Najara Street, Safed, Northern District
- Country: Israel
- Interactive map of Ashkenazi Ari Synagogue
- Coordinates: 32°58′07″N 35°29′12″E

Architecture
- Type: Synagogue architecture
- Completed: 16th century
- Materials: Stone

The Ashkenazi Ari Synagogue (Hebrew: בית הכנסת האר"י האשכנזי, romanized: Beit haKnesset haAri haAshkenazi) is an Orthodox Jewish congregation and synagogue, located on Israel Najara Street, in Safed, in the Northern District of Israel.

Dedicated in memory of Rabbi Isaac Luria, a kabbalist who was known by the Hebrew acronym "the ARI", the synagogue was completed in the late 16th-century, several years after his death in 1572. It may be the oldest synagogue in Israel that is still in use. The synagogue is known for its colorful and ornate Holy Ark.

Though the synagogue is associated by name with the Ashkenazi community, today it serves as a place of worship for both Hasidic and Sephardic Jews and remains popular among worshippers of different affiliations.

Another old Safed synagogue dedicated to Rabbi Isaac Luria is known as the Sephardic Ari Synagogue.

== History ==
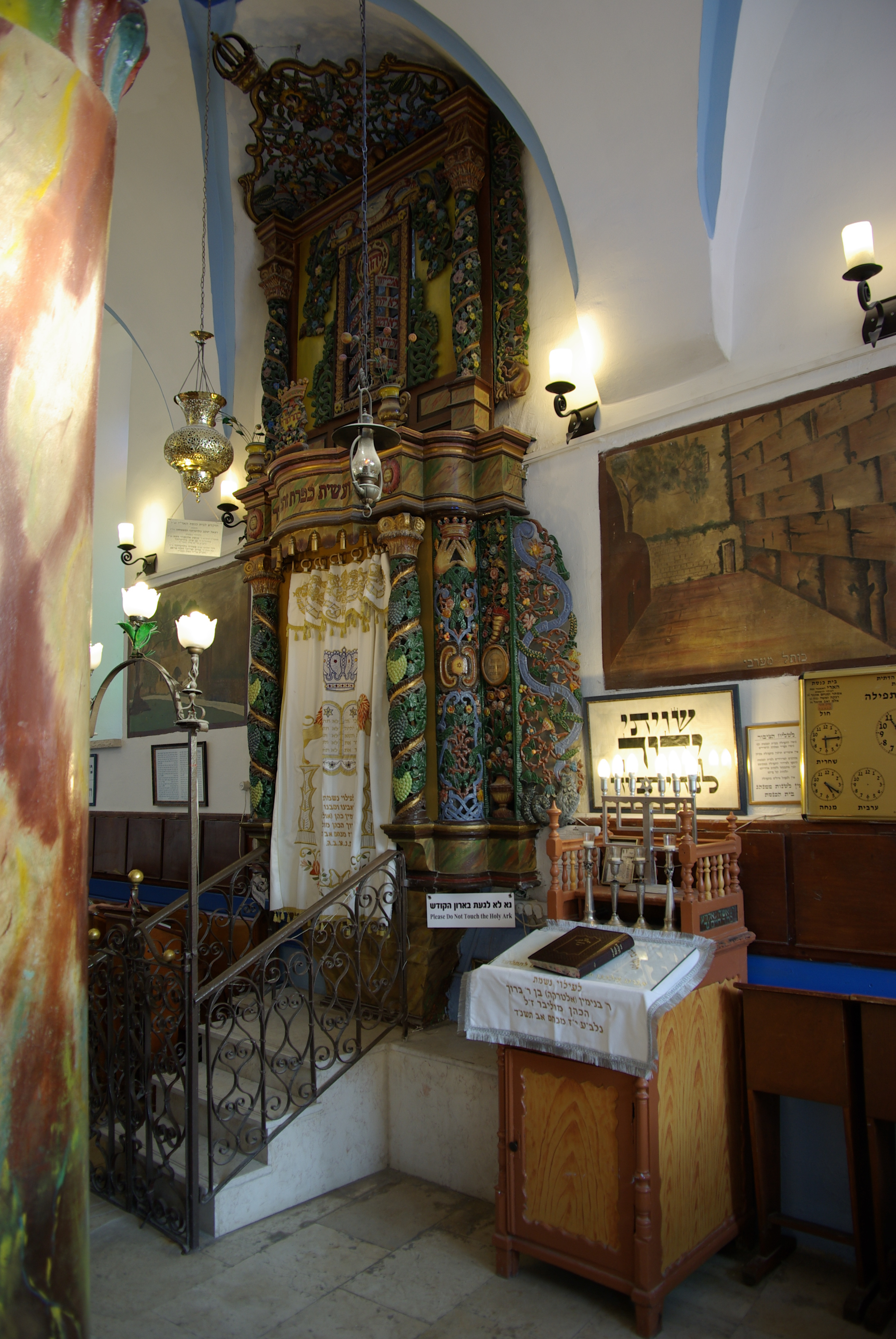
The Torah Ark in the synagogue

The synagogue was established by Sephardic immigrants from Greece who arrived in Safed during the sixteenth century. When Rabbi Isaac Luria arrived in 1570, he prayed in this synagogue on the eve of the Shabbat. During the service, he was accustomed to leave the synagogue with his disciples and walk to a nearby field to welcome the Sabbath. Alternatively, this was at the time a forested area at the margin of Safed, and the ARI used to welcome the Sabbath in these forests. The Ari's tradition of welcoming the Sabbath during Kabbalat Shabbat is still echoed in Jewish communities around the world during the singing of Lecha Dodi, when worshippers turn toward the entrance of the synagogue to "greet" the sabbath.

In the eighteenth century, with the arrival of the Hasidim from Eastern Europe, the synagogue came to serve the Ashkenazi community.

The synagogue was destroyed in the Galilee earthquake of 1837, and was rebuilt 20 years later.

During the 1948 Arab-Israeli War a bomb is said to have fallen in the courtyard. Shrapnel flew into the synagogue while it was packed with people seeking shelter, yet miraculously no one was hurt. This event is one of many miracles said to have taken place in Safed.

== Description ==
A Hebrew inscription above the entrance lintel reads: "How awe-inspiring is this place, the synagogue of the Ari of blessed memory."

The Holy Ark was carved from olive wood by a craftsman from Galicia in the style of the synagogues of Eastern Europe. It includes an anthropomorphic image of a lion, alluding to Rabbi Luria's acronym Ari, which means lion.

== See also ==
- History of the Jews in Israel
- List of synagogues in Israel
