= Moses ben Jacob Cordovero =

Rabbi and Kabbalist figure in Ottoman Syria (1522–1570)

- משה קורדובירו
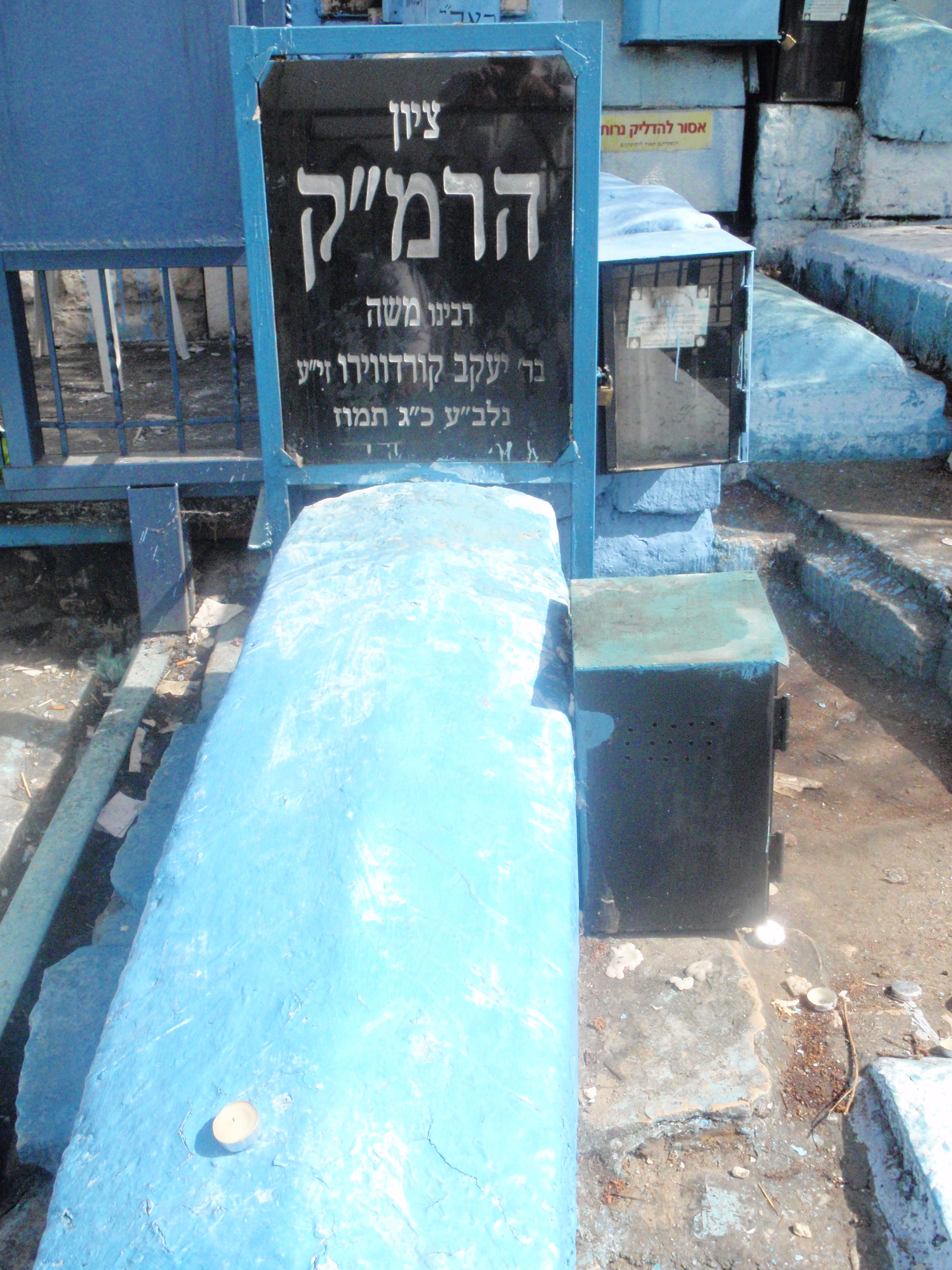
- Cordovero's grave in Safed

Personal life
- Born: 1522
- Died: 1570 (aged 47–48) Safed, Damascus Eyalet, Ottoman Empire
- Spouse: Sister of Solomon Alkabetz
- Children: Gedaliah
- Notable works: Pardes Rimonim; Or Yāqār; Tomer Devorah; Ohr Neerav; Elimah Rabbati; Sefer Gerushin
- Occupation: Rabbi, Kabbalist

Religious life
- Religion: Judaism

Moses ben Jacob Cordovero (Hebrew: משה קורדובירו Moshe Kordovero; 1522–1570) was a central figure in the historical development of Kabbalah, leader of a mystical school in the Ottoman Empire in 16th-century Safed, located in the modern State of Israel. He is known by the acronym Ramak (רמ״ק).

After the medieval flourishing of Kabbalah, centered on the Zohar, attempts were made to give a complete intellectual system to its theology, such as by Meir ben Ezekiel ibn Gabbai. Influenced by the earlier success of Jewish philosophy in articulating a rational study of Jewish thought, Cordovero produced the first full integration of the previous differing schools in Kabbalistic interpretation. While he was a mystic inspired by the opaque imagery of the Zohar, Cordoverian Kabbalah utilised the conceptual framework of emanating cause and effect from the Infinite to the Finite in systemising Kabbalah, the method of philosophical style discourse he held most effective in describing a process that reflects sequential logic and coherence. His encyclopedic works became a central stage in the development of Kabbalah.

Immediately after him in Safed, Isaac Luria articulated a subsequent system of Kabbalistic theology, with new supra-rational doctrines recasting previous Kabbalistic thought. While Lurianism displaced the Cordoverian scheme and became predominant in Judaism, its followers read Cordoverian works in harmony with their teachings. Where, to them, Lurianism described the "World" of Rectification, Cordovero described the pre-Rectification World. Both articulations of the 16th-century mystical Renaissance in Safed gave Kabbalah an intellectual prominence to rival medieval Jewish rationalism, whose social influence on Judaism had waned after the expulsion of Jews from Spain.

== Biography ==
=== Early life ===
The name Cordovero indicates that his family originated in Córdoba, Spain, and perhaps fled from there during the expulsion of 1492 ensuing from the Spanish Inquisition. His Hebrew signature, however (Cordoeiro), strongly suggests a long-lasting residence in Portugal.

Moses was either born in or moved to Safed in the Land of Israel, the city that was soon to become famed as a center of Kabbalah and mystical creativity. Although not involved in mystical studies until his twentieth year, he soon gained a reputation as an extraordinary genius and a prolific writer. Besides his knowledge in Kabbalah, he was a Talmudic scholar and a man of commanding mastery in Jewish philosophy who was respected in these fields. Contrary to popular belief, however, he was not one of the rabbis who received the special semikhah ('ordination') from Jacob Berab in 1538, alongside Joseph Karo, Cordovero's teacher of Halakha, Moses ben Joseph di Trani, Yosef Sagis, and Moshe Alshich. As a whole, Cordovero's contributions to posterity were in speculative and performative Kabbalah; however, during his lifetime, he was the renowned head of the yeshiva for Portuguese immigrants in Safed.

=== Scholarship ===
Page from a 1632 edition of Pardes Rimonim printed in Kraków

According to his testimony in the introduction to Pardes Rimonim (Orchard of Pomegranates), in 1542, at the age of twenty, Moses heard a "heavenly voice" urging him to study Kabbalah with his brother-in-law, Shlomo Alkabetz, composer of the mystical song "Lecha Dodi". He was thus initiated into the mysteries of the Zohar. The young Moses not only mastered the text but also decided to organize the kabbalistic themes leading to his day and present them in an organized fashion. This led to the composition of his first book, Pardes Rimonim, which was completed in 1548 and secured his reputation as a brilliant kabbalist and a lucid thinker. The Pardes, as it is known, was a systematization of kabbalistic thought up to that time and featured the author's attempt at reconciling early schools with the conceptual teachings of the Zohar to demonstrate an essential unity and self-consistent philosophical basis of Kabbalah.

His second work, a magnum opus entitled Precious Light (אור יקר, Or Yāqār), was a 16-volume commentary on the Zoharic literature in its entirety and a work to which the Ramak had devoted most of his life. Some other books for which he is known are the Tomer Devorah (Palm Tree of Deborah), in which he utilizes the kabbalistic concepts of the sefirot to illuminate a system of morals and ethics; Ohr Neerav, a justification of and insistence upon the importance of Kabbalah study and an introduction to the methods explicated in Pardes Rimonim; Elimah Rabbati, a highly abstract treatise on kabbalistic concerns revolving around the Godhead and its relationship to the sefirot; and the Sefer Gerushin, a short and intimate composition which features the highly devotional slant of Cordovero, as well as his asceticism and religious piety. Certain parts of Cordovero's works are still manuscripts, whereas his existing writings suggest that he had many other compositions that he either intended to write or had written, but which were lost.

=== Disciples ===
Around 1550, he founded a Kabbalah academy in Safed in the Damascus Eyalet of Ottoman Palestine, which he led for approximately twenty years until his death. He is buried in the Old Cemetery of Safed. His disciples included Eliyahu de Vidas, author of the Reshit Chochmah (Beginning of Wisdom), and Chaim Vital, who later became the official recorder and disseminator of the teachings of Isaac Luria.

Cordovero was survived by a wife, the sister of Solomon Alkabetz, whose name remains unknown, and by his son Gedaliah (1562–1625). Gedaliah was the impetus behind the publication of some of Cordovero's books in Venice between 1584 and 1587. Gedaliah was buried in Jerusalem in the Damascus Eyalet, where he had spent most of his adult life after returning from Venice.

== Succession of Kabbalistic interpretation after the Ramak ==
According to tradition, Isaac Luria (known by the acronym "Ari" or "Arizal") arrived in Safed on the exact day of the funeral of Moshe Cordovero in 1570. When he joined in the funeral procession, he realised that only he saw a pillar of fire following the Ramak's presence. The Zohar describes this spiritual revelation as a sign to the individual who sees it, that he is meant to inherit the succession of leadership from the departed person. However, as Luria had been instructed to find his chosen disciple in Safed, Haim Vital, to reveal his new teachings to, he avoided accepting Kabbalistic leadership until six months later, when Rabbi Haim Vital approached him. The Ari only lived for two years after this, until 1572, but in those few months he revolutionised the conceptual system of Kabbalah, with his new doctrines and philosophical system.

The two schools of Cordoveran and Lurianic Kabbalah give two alternative accounts and synthesis of the complete theology of Kabbalah until then, based on their interpretation of the Zohar. After the public dissemination of the Zohar in medieval times, various attempts were made to give a complete intellectual system of theology to its different schools and interpretations. Influenced by the earlier rational success of Jewish philosophy, especially the work of Maimonides, in producing a systematic intellectual articulation of Judaism, the Ramak achieved the first accepted systemisation of Kabbalah, based on its rational categorisation and study. Subsequent followers of the Ari saw their teachings as harmonious with, and a deeper interpretation of the Zohar and the Ramak's system, but the new system of Isaac Luria revealed completely new doctrines, as well as new descriptions of the earlier ideas of Kabbalah. In time, Lurianic Kabbalah emerged as the dominant system; however, the works of the Ramak are still highly esteemed and widely studied, as well.

== Among the Ramak's most visible books ==
1. Pardes Rimonim ("An Orchard of Pomegranates") — Ramak's first book, an encyclopedic synthesis of the main trends of kabbalistic thought with numerous diagrams, which secured his reputation as a mystical genius.
2. Ohr Yakar ("A Precious Light") — a magnum opus of some 16 volumes in its extant manuscript form, which had occupied Ramak throughout his adult life - a classic commentary on the Zohar, Sefer Yetzirah and the Zoharic literary offshoots. Its publication ended around 2005 in Jerusalem (some 22 volumes). Certain parts, such as Tefilah le-Moshe and Shiur Qomah, were previously published as separate works.
3. Tomer Devorah ("The Palm Tree of Deborah") — a popular work of Musar literature based on kabbalistic principles. It has been translated into English by Louis Jacobs (1960) and by Rabbi Moshe Miller (1993). The first chapter was translated with an extensive commentary by Henry Abramson (2014).
4. Eilima Rabbati — of which two-thirds is still unpublished.
5. Or Ne'erav ("A Pleasant Light," or perhaps "A Mixed Light" or "A Darkened Light") — An annotated English edition was produced by Ira Robinson (1994).
6. Sefer Gerushin ("The Book of Banishments") — A disclosure of Ramak's fellowship and their devotional piety in the Galilean outskirts of Safed. A highly informative text concerning Ramak's devotional piety and the use of landscape as the negotiator between heaven and earth.
