= Joseph ben Isaac Sambari =

Egyptian Jewish historian (1640–1703)

Joseph ben Isaac Sambari (Hebrew: יוסף בן יצחק סמברי; c. 1640 – 1703) also known as Qātāya (Arabic: قاطية) was a 17th century Egyptian Jewish historian and chronicler whose works provide important details about the affairs and conditions of 17th century Egyptian and Levantine Jewry.

== Biography ==
Born around 1640 in Cairo, Egypt, very little is known about his family or his personal life, and that which is known solely derives from details he gives about himself in his works. In his early years he studied under Rav Hananiah Barhun, a student of the historian Abraham Iskandari. According to Sambari's own testimony, Iskandari's rich library aroused in him an intense curiosity in history, and later on he made extensive use of it in writing his works. Around 1660 he worked as a scribe for the minister of finance, and became a follower of Sabbatai Zevi. After the collapse of Sabbateanism, Sambari became extremely disillusioned and decided to begin chronicling the events around him. He knew Arabic, Hebrew, and Spanish, yet his Hebrew orthography and grammar are very faulty. Sambari's main sources for his works were "Yuḥasin" by Abraham Zacuto, "Shevet Yehudah" by Solomon Ibn Virga, "Divrei ha-Yamim" by Joseph ha-Kohen, "Shalshelet ha-Kabbalah" by Gedaliah Ibn Yahya, "Kore ha-Dorot" by David Conforte, and "Seder Eliyahu Zuta" by Elijah Capsali. He also used some of the Responsa of Maimonides and David Ibn Abi Zimra. In his later life, Sambari became very interested in Kabbalah, which led him to write a hagiography of Isaac Luria. The circulation of Sambari's works was very limited in the 17th to 19th centuries, and only small sections dealing with the Ottoman sultans, messianic figures and kabbalists were published in other works. It would not be until the modern era that Sambari's works became of great interest. Sambari died in Cairo in 1703. The Qatawi family of Cairo claim Sambari as the family's patriarch.

== Works ==
=== Sefer Divrei Hakhamim ===
Sambari's first work Divrei Hakhamim ("ספר דברי חכמים", The Book Containing the Sayings of the Sages) is no longer extant, and is only known of because of a passing comment in his other works. The work was apparently a historical account from Adam to the Savoraim.

=== Porat Yosef ===
Another obscure work of Sambari, Porat Yosef (פורת יוסף) is only extant in a unique manuscript in the Alliance Israélite Universelle library. The work deals exclusively with the topics of Massorah and biblical cantillation.

=== Sefer Divrei Yosef ===
Considered to be Sambari's magnum opus, his work Divrei Yosef ("ספר דברי יוסף", The Book of Joseph’s Sayings) was completed on January 23, 1673. Sambari began this historical work with the emergence of Islam, presenting the figure of Muhammad, as seen through Jewish eyes. He then goes on to discuss the histories of the Islamic dynasties, from the Umayyads to the Ottomans. Sambari then goes on to describe the history of the Jews written against this Islamic backdrop, describing the life-stories and activities of Jewish leaders and sages, who lived around the Mediterranean from the 4th to 17th centuries. He goes into the niche details of the goings-on of Cairo's Jewry, and the relationship between Jews and Muslims. He also discusses important topographical and demographic data of certain Egyptian Jewish communities. Sambari spends 52 out of 228 chapters discussing the lives of all the Ottoman sultans and their relationship with the Ottoman Jewish communities; he also discusses acts of conquest or critical political change. Of particular interest, Sambari provides important accounts of the military conquests of Mehmed II, Selim I and Suleyman I, and their role in the campaigns against the Safavids and Mamluks. Sambari praises the Ottoman rulers calling them the "Kings who loved the Jews".

The work is written in Hebrew, but draws on the Arabic chronicle of his contemporary Aḥmad b. Zunbul, though not on Turkish chronicles, and contains a translation of part of al-Māwardī's treatise on Islamic law. It is a satirical work that employs biblical illusions and midrashim to critique Islam and Sabbateanism, and construct a Jewish ethnoreligious identity. Sambari was a former Sabbatean and had become disillusioned with that movement.
