= Moses ben Joseph di Trani =

Ottoman rabbi (1500–1580)

Rabbi Moses ben Joseph di Trani משה מטראני
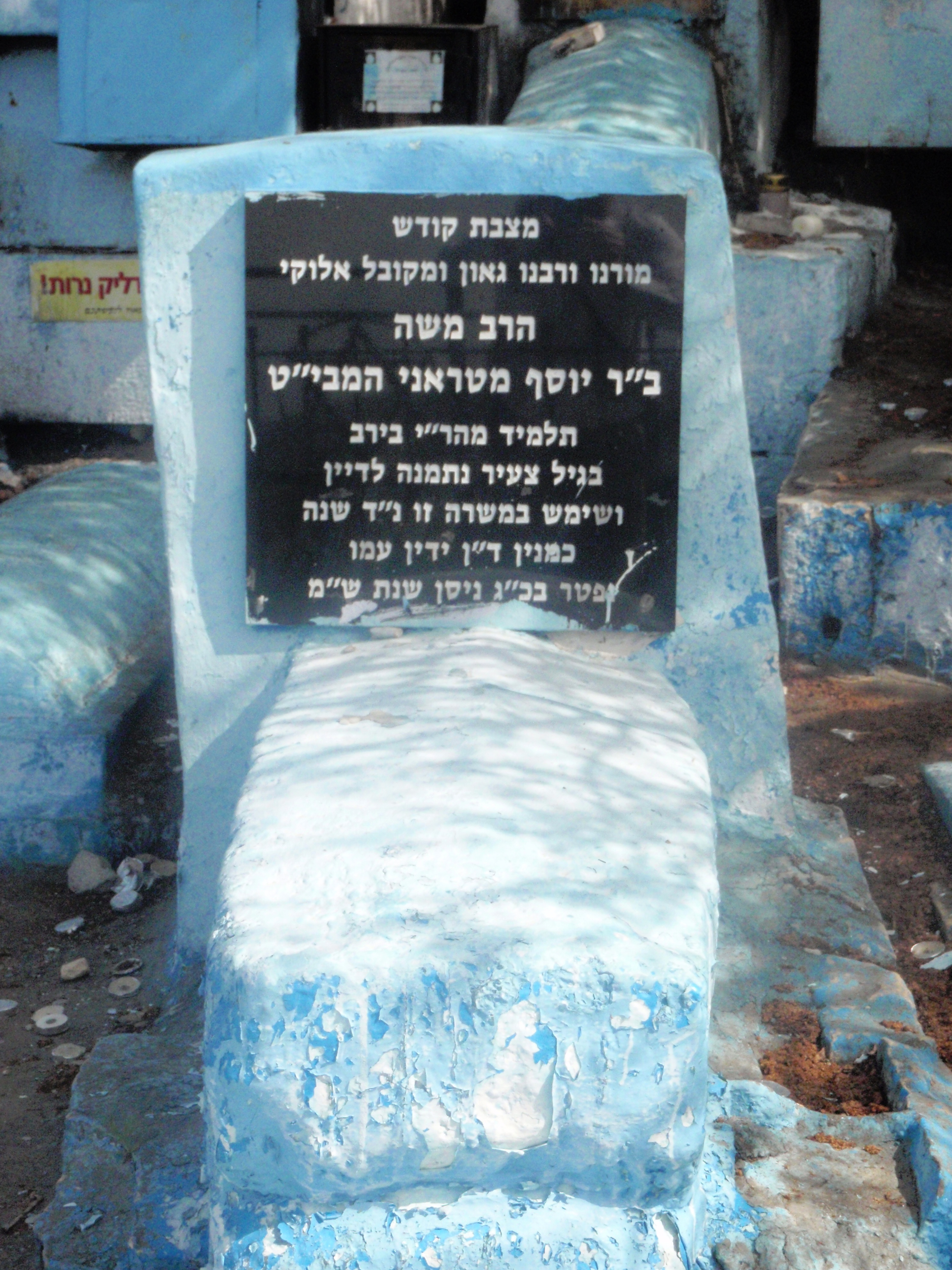
- di Trani's grave in Safed Old Jewish Cemetery

Personal life
- Born: Moses ben Joseph di Trani; 1500 Salonica, Greece
- Died: 1580 (aged 79–80) Safed, Ottoman Empire
- Buried: Safed Old Jewish Cemetery

Religious life
- Religion: Judaism

Moses ben Joseph di Trani (Hebrew: משה מטראני) the Elder, known by his acronym Mabit (Salonica, Rumelia Eyalet in Ottoman Greece 1500 – Jerusalem, Ottoman Empire 1580) was a 16th-century rabbi in Safed.

His father had fled to Salonica from Apulia three years prior to his birth. While still a boy Moses was sent to Adrianople to pursue the study of the Talmud under the supervision of his uncle Aaron. At the age of sixteen he went to Safed and completed his studies under Jacob Berab. In 1525 he was appointed rabbi of Safed; he held this office for some fifty-five years, when he eventually moved to Jerusalem.

According to a 16th-century Jewish traveler who visited Safed in 1567, Rabbi Moses di Trani was still living in Safed:

...When God caused me to wander from my father's house, and the fire of this exile burned within me, whether it was in the land of India, and Basra and Babylonia, till mine own mind had almost been confounded; along with Erech and Accad, and Calneh and Nisibis, the place of the reciter of oral traditions, Rabbi Judah ben Bathyra, a man endowed with understanding; and Hamath and Damascus and Syria, and Safed and Tiberias. There, those who are destined for the world to come are to be found, those who fear God and whose conversation is daily based aright in what concerns men of conviction. The head of them all is the wise man, Rabbi Joseph Karo, and the wise man, Rabbi Moses di Trani, and Rabbi Moses Cordovero, the kabbalist, who spreads out his roots by the river; while in Tiberius was the wise man, (Rabbi Eleazar b. Simeon) ben Yochai, in whose generation he was of singular character.

== Works ==
Moses di Trani was the author of:

- Bet Elohim (Venice, 1576), a moral and philosophical work on prayer, atonement, and the fundamental principles of faith
- Kiryat Sefer (Venice, 1551), a commentary on the Bible, the Talmud, and difficult passages in the commentaries of Maimonides
- Sefer ha-Tehiyyah weha-Pedut (Mantua, 1556; Wilna, 1799; Sudzilkov, 1834; Warsaw, 1841), a commentary and notes on ch. vii and viii of Saadia Gaon's Emunot we-Deot
- She'elot u-Teshubot (vol. i, ib. 1629; vol. ii, ib. 1630), a collection of 841 responsa, with an index
