= Moshe Alshich =

Moshe Alshich משה אלשיך
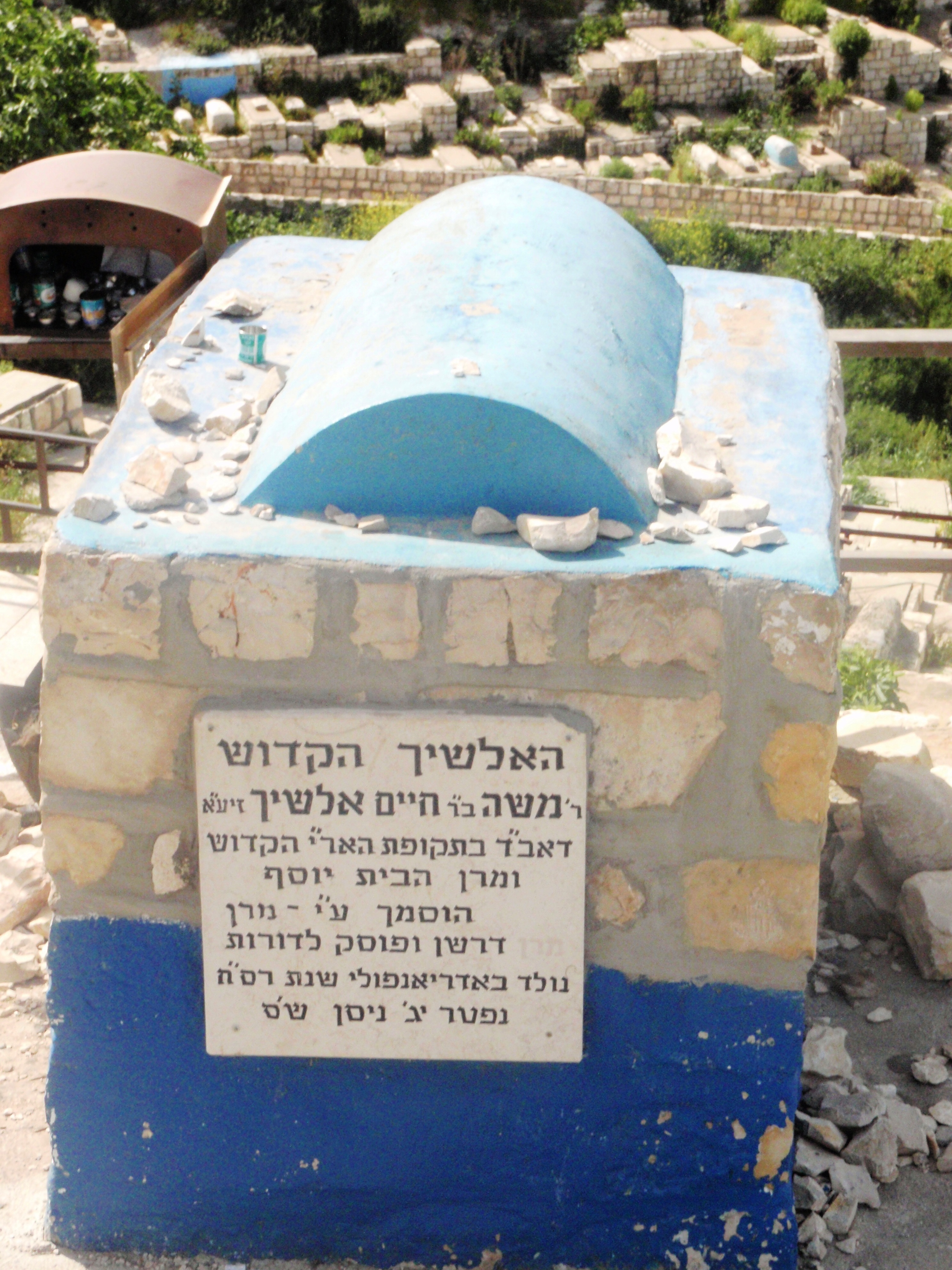
- Alshich's grave in Safed

Personal life
- Born: 1508 Adrianople, Ottoman Empire
- Died: 1593 (aged 84–85) Safed, Ottoman Empire
- Buried: Safed Old Jewish Cemetery

Religious life
- Religion: Judaism

Moshe Alshich, Hebrew: משה אלשיך, also spelled Alshech or Alsheikh, (1508–1593), known as the Alshich Hakadosh (the Holy), was a prominent rabbi, preacher, and biblical commentator in the latter part of the sixteenth century.

== Life ==
The Alshich was born in 1508 in the Ottoman city of Adrianople, and was the son of Hayyim Alshich. He studied in Saloniki under the exiled hakhamim Joseph Taitatzak and Joseph Karo, author of the "Shulchan Aruch".

Alshich followed Karo to Safed, in modern-day Israel, where he taught notable students including Rabbi Hayim Vital and Rabbi Yom Tov Tzahalon. Although the Alshich belonged to the circle of the Kabbalists who lived at the city, his works rarely betray any traces of the Kabbalah. He is celebrated as a teacher, preacher, and casuist.

Little is known of his life. In his works he avoids mention of himself, telling only of his course of study; thus in the preface to his commentary on the Pentateuch he says:

I never aimed at things too high or beyond me. From my earliest days the study of the Talmud was my chief occupation, and I assiduously attended the yeshivah where I made myself familiar with the discussions of Abaye and Rava. The night I devoted to research and the day to Halakha. In the morning I read the Talmud and in the afternoon the Posekim (Rabbinic legal decisions). Only on Fridays could I find time for the reading of Scripture and Midrash in preparation for my lectures on the Sidra of the week and similar topics, which I delivered every Sabbath before large audiences, eager to listen to my instruction.

Alshich travelled through Syria, Turkey, and Persia. Legend has it that his son was taken as a child and became a Muslim, and the Arizal authored a special prayer for the son's return.

He died in Safed in 1593.

== Significance ==
Only a few rabbis were granted the title "Hakadosh" throughout Jewish history. Alongside the Alshich were the Shelah HaKadosh, the Ari HaKadosh and the Ohr HaChaim HaKadosh, all of them distinctive personalities in their times. Various reasons have been suggested as to why the Alshich received the "HaKadosh" ("Holy") title.

His homiletical commentaries on the Torah and the Prophets enjoy much popularity and are still studied today, largely because of their powerful influence as practical exhortations to virtuous life.

== Works ==
These lectures were afterward published as "Commentaries" (perushim) on the books of the Holy Scriptures, and Alshich gives a remarkable reason for their publication: "Many of those who had listened to my lectures repeated them partly or wholly in their own names. These offenses will be prevented by the publication of my own work". These lectures, though somewhat lengthy, were not tedious to his audience. The author repeatedly declares that in their printed form (as "Commentaries") he greatly curtailed them by omitting everything which was not absolutely necessary, or which he had already mentioned in another place.

Like Abravanel and some other commentators, Alshich headed each section of his comments with a number of questions which he anticipated on the part of the reader; he then proceeded to give a summary of his view, and concluded with answering all the questions seriatim. His Commentaries abound in references to Talmud, Midrash and Zohar, but contain scant references to other commentaries, such as the works of Abravanel, Gersonides or Maimonides. His explanations are all of a homiletical character; his sole object being to find in each sentence or in each word of the Scriptures a moral lesson, a support for trust in God, encouragement to patient endurance, and a proof of the vanity of all earthly goods as compared with the everlasting bliss to be acquired in the future life. He frequently and earnestly appeals to his brethren, exhorting them to repent, and to abandon, or at least restrict, the pursuit of all worldly pleasures, and thus accelerate the approach of the Messianic era. Alshich possessed an easy and fluent style; his expositions are mostly of an allegorical character, but very rarely approach mysticism. In his commentary on the Song of Solomon, he calls peshaִt (literal explanation) and sod (mystical interpretation) the two opposite extremes, while he declares his own method of introducing allegorical exposition to be the safe mean between these extremes. Alshich wrote the following commentaries, most of which have appeared in several editions:

1. "Torat Mosheh" (Commentary on the Pentateuch), first ed. Belvedere near Constantinople, about 1593. Complete, with Indexes, Venice, 1601.
2. An abstract of this commentary was prepared by Jos. b. Aryeh Loeb, and has appeared in various forms (entitled: "Qitsur Alshich 'al ha-Torah"), Amsterdam, 1748.
3. "Marot ha-Tsobeot" (Collected Visions), on the prophets and their prophecies, Venice, 1803–7.
4. Extracts from this commentary are included in "Minhah Qe'tannah," a commentary on the earlier prophets; published in the Biblia Rabbinica (Qohelet Mosheh), Amsterdam, 1724.
5. "Romemot El" (Praises of God), on the book of Psalms, Venice, 1605.
6. "Rab Peninim" (Multitude of Pearls), on Proverbs, Venice, 1601.
7. "Helqat Mehoqeq" (The Lawgiver's Portion), on Job, Venice, 1603.
8. "Shoshanat ha-'Amaqim" (Lily of the Valleys), on the Song of Solomon. This commentary was the first to appear in print, and was edited by Alshich himself in 1591. According to this commentary, the Song is an allegory, and represents a dialogue between God and exiled Israel on the latter's mission.
9. "'Ene Mosheh" (Eyes of Moses), on Ruth. Alshich says of the book of Ruth, "Surely from it we might take a lesson how to serve God"; and illustrates this statement throughout his commentary, Venice, 1601.
10. "Devarim Nihumim" (Comforting Words), on the "Lamentations of Jeremiah". The title is not merely a euphemism for Lamentations; the author repeatedly attempts to show that there is no cause for despair, God being with Israel, and though the Temple is destroyed the Shekinah has not departed from the Western Wall, Venice, 1601.
11. "Devarim Tovim" (Good Words), on Ecclesiastes. Alshich calls Ecclesiastes, on account of its deep thoughts, "Waters without end" (oceans). He endeavors in the commentary to illustrate, as the central idea of the book, the dictum, "All is vain, except the fear of the Lord, which is the essential condition of man's real existence," Venice, 1601.
12. "Massat Mosheh" (Moses' Gift), on the book of Esther, presented by the author to his brethren as a Purim gift, Venice, 1601.
13. The commentaries of Alshich on these last-named five books ("megillot", "scrolls") appeared in an abridged form, edited by Eleazer b. Hananiah Tarnigrad, Amsterdam, 1697.
14. "Habatselet ha-Sharon" (The Rose of Sharon), on the book of Daniel, Safed, 1563, and Venice, 1592.
15. A commentary on the "Hafִtarot" called "Liqqute Man" (Gatherings of Manna), was compiled chiefly from "Marot ha-Tsobeot," by E. M. Markbreit, Amsterdam, 1704.
16. "Yarim Mosheh" is the title of a commentary on Abot, gathered from the works of Alshich by Joseph B. M. Schlenker, Fürth, 1764.
17. A commentary of Alshich on the Haggadah appears in the edition of the Haggadah called "Beit Horim" (House of Free Men). The commentary is full of interesting remarks and earnest exhortations (Metz, 1767). Even in the introduction the laws for Passover and the order for the evening are treated allegorically, and made the vehicle for religious meditation. It is, however, not likely that Alshich wrote these notes for the Haggadah. They were probably gathered from his works long after his death, as otherwise the Haggadah would have been published with his commentary much earlier.
18. "Responsa"; as a casuist he was frequently consulted by other rabbis, and his decisions were collected in a volume of responsa (Venice, 1605; Berlin, 1766). His contemporaries frequently quote his opinions. During his lifetime Azariah dei Rossi produced his "Meor Einayim" (Light for the Eyes), in which the author rejected some beliefs generally received as traditional; Alshich, at the request of his teacher, R. Joseph Caro, wrote a declaration against the "Meor Einayim" as being contrary and dangerous to the Jewish religion (Kerem Chemed, v. 141).
19. Alshich wrote also a poem, "Dirge on the Exile of Israel," in a very simple style in ten rhyming verses. It has been introduced into various earlier morning rituals, such as "Ayelet ha-Shachar" (The Morning Dawn). It is also contained in the collection of prayers and hymns called "Sha'are Zion" (The Gates of Zion).

== Burial place ==
He is buried in Old Cemetery of Safed (Tzfat).

Other notable rabbis also buried in Old Cemetery of Safed:

- Ari HaKadosh
- Shlomo Halevi Alkabetz
- Moses ben Jacob Cordovero
- Joseph Karo
