= Jacob Berab =

Sephardic rabbi and talmudist (1474–1546)

Rabbi Jacob Berab
- יעקב בירב
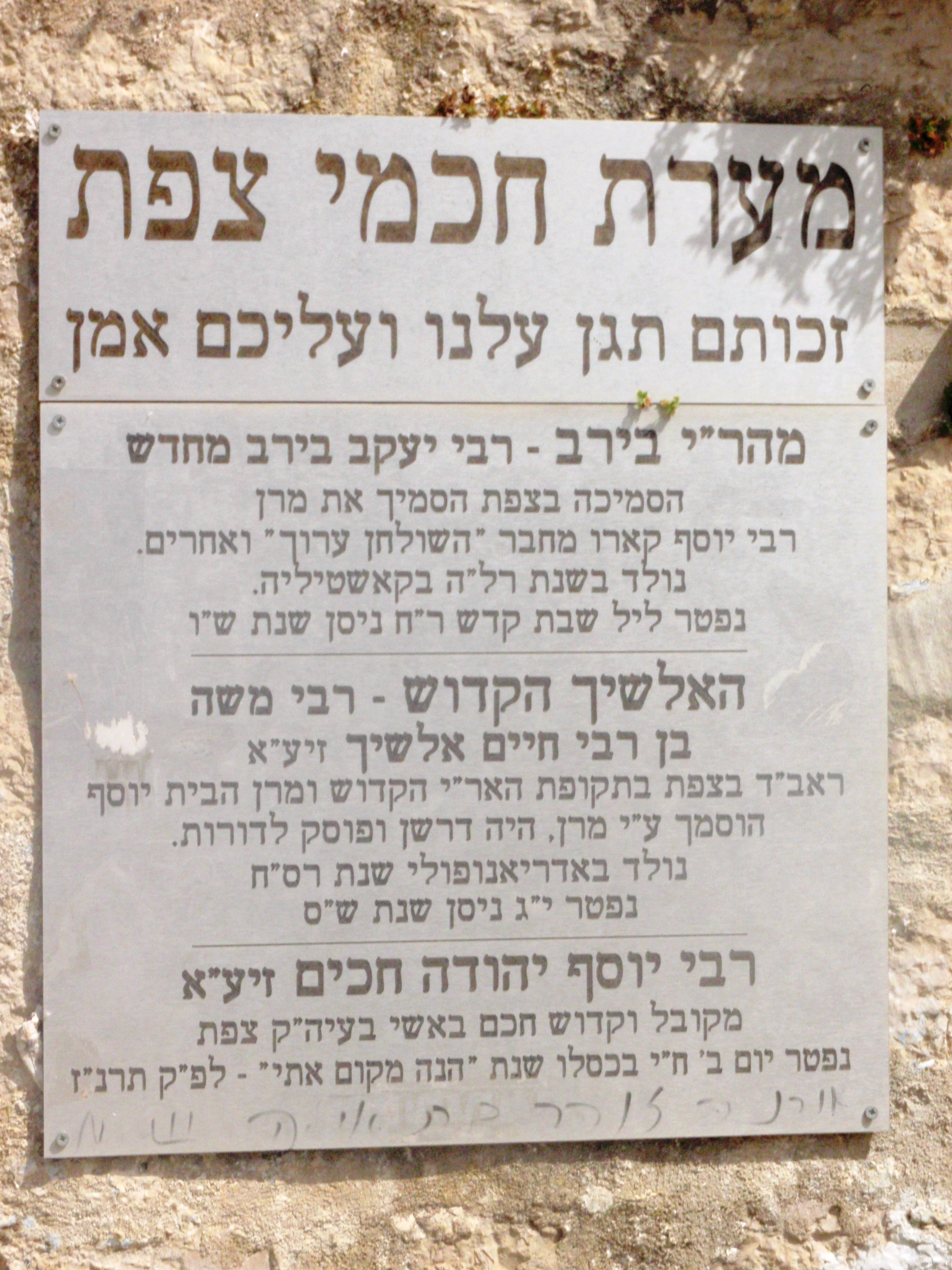
- Plaque outside the burial cave of Jacob Berab, Safed, Israel

Personal life
- Born: 1474 Maqueda, Castile
- Died: April 3, 1546 (aged 71–72) Safed, Ottoman Syria
- Buried: Safed Old Jewish Cemetery

Religious life
- Religion: Judaism

Jacob Berab (Hebrew: יעקב בירב), also spelled Berav or Bei-Rav, known as Mahari Beirav (1474 – April 3, 1546), was an influential rabbi and talmudist best known for his attempt to reintroduce classical semikhah (ordination) and the Sanhedrin.

== Biography ==
Berab was born at Maqueda near Toledo, Castilian Spain in 1474. He later became a pupil of Isaac Aboab. After the expulsion of Jews from Spain, he fled to Fez in Wattasid-ruled Morocco. The Fez Jewish community, consisting of 5000 families, chose him for their rabbi, though he was but a youth of eighteen. From there he went to Tlemçen, then the chief town of the Barbary states. There, the Jewish community consisting of 5000 families, chose him for their rabbi, though he was but a youth of eighteen. Evidence of the great respect there paid him is afforded by the following lines of Abraham Gavison quoted by Isaiah Berlin's Omer ha-Shikḥah: "Say not that the lamp of the Law no longer in Israel burneth! Jacob Berab hath come back—once more among us he sojourneth!"

It is not known how long Berab remained in Algeria; but before 1522 he was in Jerusalem. There, however, the social and economic conditions were so oppressive that he did not stay long, but went with his pupils to Egypt. Several years later (1527) Berab, now fairly well-to-do, resided in Damascus; in 1533 he became rabbi at Cairo; and several years after he seems to have finally settled in Safed, which then contained the largest Jewish community in Ottoman Syria. It was there that Berab conceived the bold idea which made him famous, that of establishing a central spiritual Jewish power.

== Plan for ordination ==
Berab had a plan for the reintroduction of the old semikhah "rabbinic ordination". It is likely that his further plans included the reestablishment of the Sanhedrin. Berab's model was the Sanhedrin of tannaitic times, which consisted of men who could trace their ordination back to Moses; yet for more than a thousand years no such men had existed, and the semikhah was lost.

According to Louis Ginzberg, Berab's undertaking was part of a larger Messianic vision. In this period, Ginsburg says,

the imaginative and sentimental persons thought that the promised Messianic time was approaching; they regarded their great sufferings as the process of purgation, as the חבלי משיח, the eschatologic "birth-throes," of the Messianic era". These hopes "afforded the right person an excellent opportunity to create for the Jews a recognized central authority, spiritual—and perhaps, in time, political—in character. There is no doubt that the man for the purpose was Berab; he was the most important and honored Talmudist in the Orient, and was endowed with perseverance amounting to obstinacy.

According to others, the purpose of Berab's plan was a resolution of certain halachic difficulties. In particular, there was a problem of Marranos returning to the Jewish faith, and in order to free them from divine punishment some rabbis of the Land of Israel considered applying to them the punishment of makkot, which can only be assigned by Sanhedrin. Jacob Berab writes about this problem in his Responsa.

Maimonides taught that if the sages in the Land of Israel would agree to ordain one of themselves, they could do so, and that the man of their choice could then ordain others. Although Maimonides' opinion had been opposed by Nahmanides and others, the scholars at Safed had confidence in Berab, and had no doubt that, from a rabbinical standpoint, no objection to his plan could be raised.

== Ordination of 1538 ==
In 1538, twenty-five rabbis met in assembly at Safed and ordained Berab, giving him the right to ordain any number of others, who would then form a Sanhedrin. In a discourse in the synagogue at Safed, Berab defended the legality of his ordination from a Talmudic standpoint, and showed the nature of the rights conferred upon him. On hearing of this event most of the other Jewish scholars expressed their agreement, and the few who discountenanced the innovation lacked the courage to oppose Berab and his following.

Berab then ordained a few other rabbis, including the Chief Rabbi of Jerusalem Levi ibn Habib, Rabbi Joseph Caro, Moses ben Joseph di Trani, and Yosef Sagis. Joseph Caro later ordained Rabbi Moshe Alshich, and Alshich ordained Hayyim ben Joseph Vital around 1590.

== Dispute with ibn Habib ==
To obtain the goodwill of the Jews of Jerusalem, the first use Berab made of his new authority was to ordain the chief rabbi of Jerusalem, Levi ibn Habib. Although the latter had long been a personal opponent of Berab, and the two had frequently disputed rabbinical decisions and approbations, Berab's ordination of ibn Habib demonstrated that he placed communal interests above personal differences. Moreover, the terms in which Berab officially announced ibn Habib's ordination were cordial. But Ibn Habib did not react kindly to his ordination. He considered it an insult to his dignity and that of Jerusalem that such an important change should be made without consulting Jerusalem's scholars. He did not content himself with an oral protest but sent a communication to the scholars of Safed, in which he challenged the legality of their proceedings and declared that the innovation posed a risk to rabbinical Judaism, since the Sanhedrin might use its sovereign authority to tamper with the calendar.

Although Levi ibn Habib's tone was moderate, all could infer that he opposed the Berab as a person in addition to his work. An illustration of this is afforded by the remarks made by ibn Habib when he maintained at length that the scholars of Safed were not qualified to ordain, since they were not unprejudiced in the matter, and when he hinted that Berab was not worthy to transmit ordination. Berab was surprised by the peril in which his undertaking was now placed; and, embittered by ibn Habib's personal attacks, he could not adhere to a merely objective refutation, but indulged in personalities. In answer to ibn Habib's observation, that a sacred ordination must not proceed from learning alone, but from holiness also, Berab replied: "I never changed my name: in the midst of want and despair I went in God's way"; thereby alluding to the fact that, when a youth, ibn Habib had lived for a year in Portugal as a Christian under an assumed name.

The strife between Berab and ibn Habib now became wholly personal, and this had a bad effect on the plan; for Berab had many admirers but few friends. Moreover, Berab's life was endangered. The ordination had been represented to the Ottoman authorities as the first step toward the restoration of the Jewish state, and, since Berab was rich, the Ottoman officials would have shown him scant mercy in order to lay hands on his wealth. Berab was forced to go to Egypt for a while, but though each moment's delay might have cost him his life, he tarried long enough to ordain four rabbis, so that during his absence they might continue to exercise the function of ordination. In the meantime ibn Habib's following increased; and when Berab returned, he found his plan to be hopeless. His death some years later put an end to the dispute which had gradually arrayed most of the Jewish scholars in hostile lines on the question of ordination.

It is known positively that Joseph Caro and Moses ben Joseph di Trani were two of the four men ordained by Berab. If the other two were Abraham Shalom and Israel ben Meir di Curiel, then Caro was the only one who used his privilege to ordain another, Moses Alshich, who, in turn, ordained Hayim Vital. Thus ordination might be traced for four generations.

With the exception of some short contributions to the works of others, the only one of Berab's numerous works ever published was his responsa Sheëlot u-Teshubot (Questions and Answers) in Venice, 1663; but the Amsterdam edition of the rabbinical Tanakh (1724–28) contains notes by Berab on the Book of Isaiah and the Book of Jeremiah.

== Rulings ==
- Berab viewed Portuguese conversos—Jews who were forcibly converted to Christianity—as remaining Jewish despite their conversion and subsequent generations.
- In an inheritance dispute, Berab ruled that only the children born to one converso's Jewish wife were entitled to inherit. The daughters of his Flemish concubine, who had remained Christian and did not convert to Judaism, were deemed of gentile status and thus were not eligible for inheritance.
