= Levi ibn Habib =

Ottoman Chief Rabbi of Jerusalem (c. 1480 – c. 1545)

- לוי בן חביב

Personal life
- Born: c. 1480
- Died: c. 1545 Jerusalem, Ottoman Empire
- Notable works: She'elot u-Teshubot; Kontres ha-Semikah; Perush Kiddush HaChodesh
- Other name: HaRaLBaCh
- Occupation: Chief Rabbi of Jerusalem

Religious life
- Religion: Judaism

Levi ibn Habib (Hebrew: לוי בן חביב; c. 1480 – c. 1545), also known by the acronym HaRaLBaCh, was Chief Rabbi of Jerusalem from 1525 until his death.

Under King Manuel of Portugal, and when about seventeen, he was compelled to submit to baptism, but at the first opportunity fled to Salonica, where he could follow the dictates of his conscience in safety. In 1523 he went to Jerusalem, but in a short time returned to Salonica. In 1525 he settled permanently in Jerusalem, where his learning won him the position of chief rabbi. There he met Jacob Berab, with whom he often came into conflict on questions of rabbinical law. A serious quarrel broke out between these two rabbis when Berab, becoming chief rabbi of Safed, reintroduced the ancient practice of the semikhah (rabbinical ordination). They carried on a bitter and envenomed controversy for some time, in the course of which Berab referred to Ibn Habib's adoption of Christianity. The latter frankly admitted the fact, but pointed out that at the time he was a mere youth, that his involuntary profession of Christianity lasted hardly a year, and that he took the first opportunity to escape and rejoin the religion of his father. This controversy was chiefly responsible for the fact that the practice of ordination ceased again soon after Berab's death.

== Writings ==
He was knowledgeable in mathematics and astronomy. In his youth he edited his father's book Ein Yaakov (Constantinople, 1516; by Jacob ibn Habib). He wrote: She'elot u-Teshubot, a collection of 147 responsa; Kontres ha-Semikah, a treatise on ordination; Perush Kiddush HaChodesh, a commentary on Hilchot Kiddush HaChodesh (rules governing the construction of the Hebrew calendar in Maimonides' code of law). All these works were published together in Venice (1565); the last-named work was also published separately (ib. 1574–76).

Jewish titles
New title	Chief Rabbi of Jerusalem; 1525–1540	Succeeded by David ben Solomon ibn Abi Zimra
