= Yom Tov Tzahalon =

Jewish rabbi and author (c. 1559 – 1638)

Yom Tov ben Moshe Tzahalon
- יום טוב בן משה צהלון

Personal life
- Born: c. 1559
- Died: 1638 Safed, Eyalet of Sidon
- Notable works: Lekach Tov; Responsa and novellæ; Magen Avot
- Occupation: Rabbi, author

Religious life
- Religion: Judaism

Jewish leader
- Teacher: Moses di Trani, Moshe Alshich
- Influenced by: Joseph Caro

Yom Tov ben Moshe Tzahalon (Hebrew: יום טוב בן משה צהלון; c. 1559 – 1638), also known as the Maharitz, was a student of Moses di Trani and Moshe Alshich, and published a collection of responsa.

Aged twenty-five, Tzahalon was requested by Rabbi Samuel Yafeh of Constantinople to decide a difficult and complicated problem which had been referred to himself and he corresponded with most of the authorities of his time, one of his chief antagonists being Moses Galante (the Elder). Although a Sephardi, Tzahalon rendered a decision in favour of an Ashkenazic congregation in a controversy which arose between the Sephardim and Ashkenazim at Jerusalem, and in his love of truth he did not spare even his teacher, Joseph Caro, declaring that the Shulchan Aruch was written for children and laymen. Tzahalon was the author of a commentary on the Book of Esther, entitled Lekach Tov (Safed, 1577). He was the author of responsa and novellæ which were published with a preface by his grandson Yom-Tov (Venice, 1694), and he mentions also a second part, of which nothing more is known (Machon Yerushalayim has published more of his responsa in 1979). He likewise wrote a commentary on the Abot de-Rabbi Natan, entitled Magen Avot, which is still extant in manuscript. In his preface to this latter work Tzahalon terms himself Yom-Tov ben Moses ha-Sefardi, whence it is clear that the family came originally from Spain, although it is not known when it emigrated or where Tzahalon was born.

== Jewish Encyclopedia bibliography ==
- Giovanni Bernardo De Rossi, Dizionario, s.v.;
- Graziadio Nepi, Mordecai Ghirondi, Toledot Gedole Yisrael, p. 206;
- Dukes, in Orient, Lit. ix. 346;
- Moritz Steinschneider, Cat. Bodl. col. 1414.
