= Hayyim ben Joseph Vital =

Rabbi and foremost disciple of Isaac Luria (1542–1620)

Hayyim ben Joseph Vital Calabrese/Calabris
- חַיִּים בֶּן יוֹסֵף וִיטָאל

Personal life
- Born: 11 October 1542 Safed, Ottoman Palestine
- Died: 23 April 1620 (aged 77) Damascus, Ottoman Syria
- Notable works: Etz Chaim (book); Shaar HaGilgulim; Shemonah She'arim
- Occupation: Rabbi, kabbalist

Religious life
- Religion: Judaism

Jewish leader
- Teacher: Isaac Luria, Moses ben Jacob Cordovero, Moshe Alshich
- Influenced by: Joseph Karo

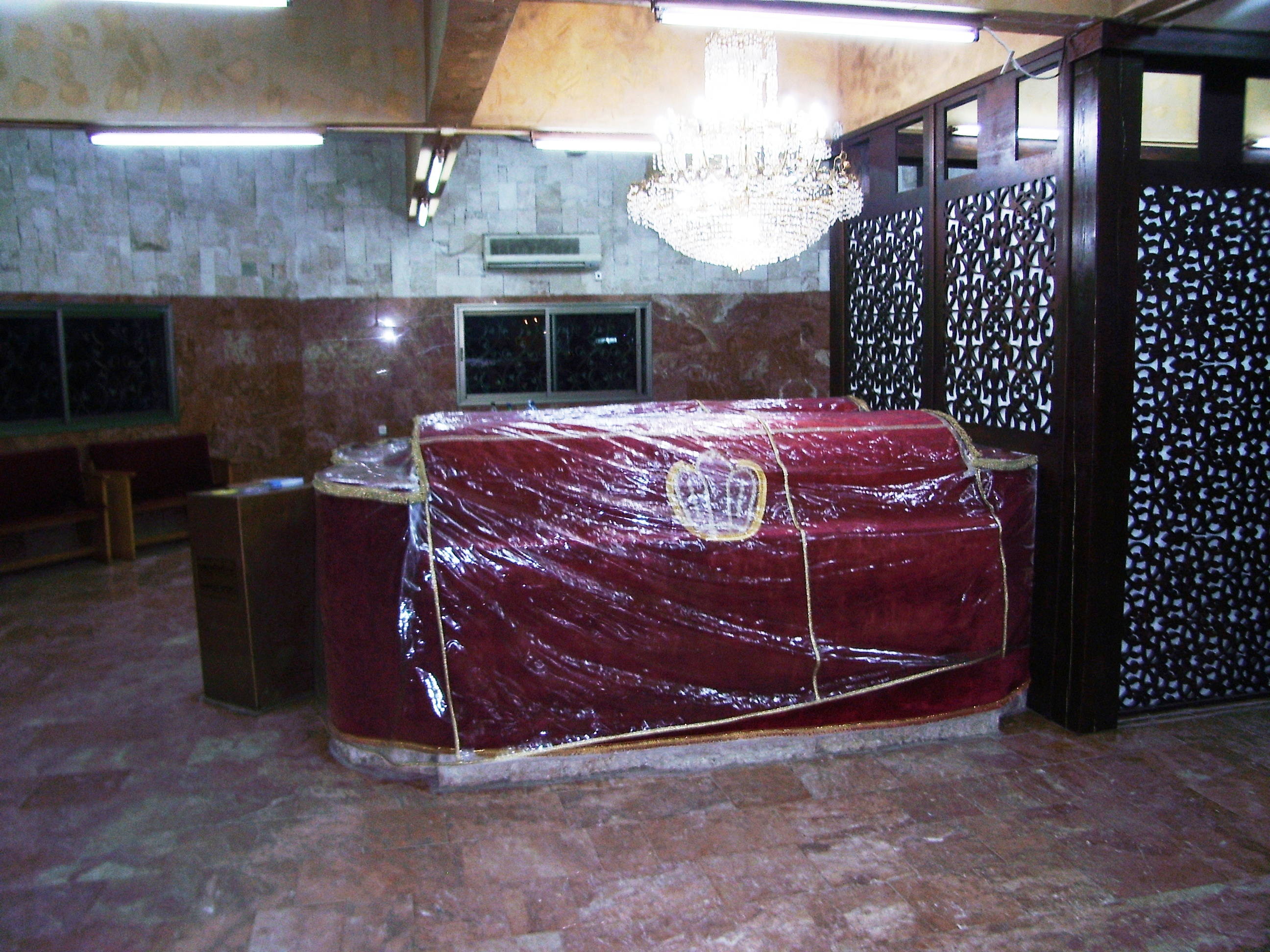
Tomb in Kiryat Malachi

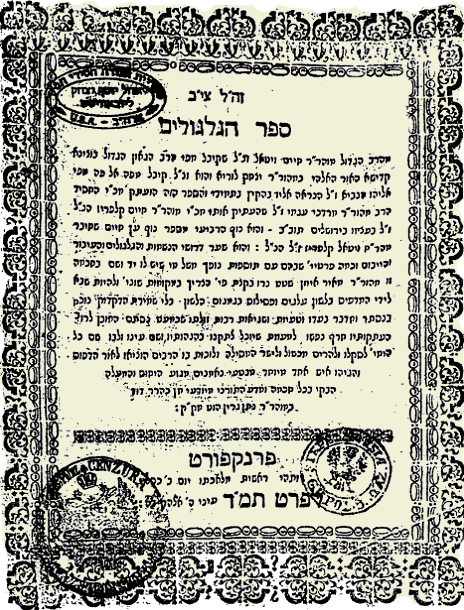
Sefer HaGilgulim, Frankfurt

Hayyim ben Joseph Vital (Hebrew: חַיִּים בֶּן יוֹסֵף וִיטָאל; Safed, October 23, 1542 (Julian calendar) / October 11, 1542 (Gregorian Calendar) – Damascus, 23 April 1620) was a rabbi in Safed and the foremost disciple of Isaac Luria. He recorded much of his master's teachings. After Vital's death, his writings began to spread and led to a "powerful impact on various circles throughout the Jewish world."

== Early life ==
Born in Safed, as a young boy Hayyim Vital was educated by the scholar Moshe Alshich. Joseph Karo is said to have paid special attention to Vital's early talents and in 1557 requested that Alshich take special care in his education as he was destined to succeed his teacher in the world of Torah study. That same year, Vital first became acquainted with the kabbalist Isaac Luria, who would have a lasting influence on him.

Vital apparently married at a young age. It was an unhappy marriage, and when he left his wife, it is said the prophet Elijah appeared to him in a dream and led him to a beautiful garden, where he saw the pious of all ages, in the form of birds, flying through the garden and studying the Mishnah. In the center of the garden was God seated on a throne that was surrounded by the pious, resting on elaborate tapestries. Convinced by this vision that he was destined to become a kabbalist, Vital devoted the following two and a half years to the study of alchemy. Upon completing his studies, Elijah appeared to him again in a vision and told him that he would succeed in his efforts and write a commentary on the Zohar.

== Study with Cordovero ==
When Luria arrived in Safed, Moses ben Jacob Cordovero had been the principal figure in the kabbalistic community for numerous years. "Cordovero was the teacher of what appears to have been a relatively loose-knit circle of disciples. The most important were Eliyahu de Vidas, Abraham ben Mordecai Galante, Moses Galante, Hayyim Vital, Abraham ben Eliezer Halevi, Elazar ben Moshe Azikri, Samuel Gallico, and an important kabbalist who studied with Cordovero for a short while in the 1560s, Mordechai Dato."

Evidence suggests that Isaac Luria also regarded Moses Cordovero as his teacher. Joseph ben Isaac Sambari (1640-1703), an Egyptian chronicler, testified that Cordovero was "the Ari's teacher for a very short time." Luria probably arrived in early 1570, and Cordovero died on June 27 that year (the 23d day of Tammuz). Bereft of their most prominent authority and teacher, the kabbalists looked for new guidance, and Isaac Luria helped fill the vacuum left by Cordovero's passing.

== Student of Isaac Luria ==
In 1570, Vital became a student of Isaac Luria, the foremost kabbalist of the day. In a study of Lurianic mysticism, Lawrence Fine writes:

Vital provides us with the names of 38 individuals who according to him, made up Luria's discipleship... According to him, the fellowship was divided into four hierarchically ordered groups. The first and most important, was composed of 11 men, listed in this order: Hayyim Vital, Jonathan Sagis, Joseph Arzin, Isaac Kohen, Gedaliah ha-Levi, Samuel Uceda, Judah Mishan, Abraham Gavriel, Shabbatai Menashe, Joseph ibn Tabul, and Elijah Falko (or Falkon).

It is broadly accepted that Hayyim Vital emerged as the leading student within a year, so when Luria died in 1572 at the age of 38, Vital succeeded him. Since Luria had left almost none of his teachings in writing, Vital began to write down everything he had learned from his master.

== Exile and return ==
Hayyim Vital arrived in Egypt in 1577 but soon returned to Ottoman Palestine, visiting the village of Ein al-Zeitun before moving to Jerusalem later that year. There, he headed a yeshiva for nearly a decade, but refrained from publicly teaching kabbalah. In 1586, he returned to Safed, where he lived until 1592. His former teacher, Moshe Alshich, ordained him there in 1590. While in Safed, he also fell sick and was bedridden for an entire year. From 1594 to 1597, he was again in Jerusalem. In 1597, he moved from Jerusalem to Damascus, where he likely remained for the rest of his life.

His first book consisted mostly of an exposition on the conjuring of clouds and a discourse on the classical planets, the seven heavens, and their corresponding metals.

He also authored Shaar HaGilgulim, a kabbalistic work on reincarnation, which became one of the Shemonah She'arim "Eight Gates."

== Etz Hayyim ==
During this illness Joshua Ben-Nun, his closest follower, who had accompanied Vital on nearly every journey, managed to bribe Vital's younger brother, Moshe, with 50 gold coins to lend him Vital's writings, which were kept locked in a box. Moshe accordingly brought Joshua a large part of the manuscripts, and 100 copyists were immediately engaged and given 6 pages each: in just three days, they reproduced 600 pages. Although according to some reports Vital, upon learning of this, claimed that the papers which has been copied were not his writings, they were rapidly disseminated. The writings in question purported to contain the teachings of Luria rather than Vital's independent work.

The first printed edition was in eight volumes, known as the Shemonah She'arim, and some Kabbalists still use this version in the Sephardi world. The best-known recension was published later under the title Etz Hayyim ("Tree of Life"), in which the topics were arranged in a more systematic order, and the parts on ritual (the Peri Etz Hayyim) were kept separate from the parts on the underlying theology. In addition to a tribute to Luria, the work contains the assertion that it is one of God's greatest pleasures to witness the promotion of the teaching of the Kabbalah since this alone can assure the coming of the Messiah.

However, Vital still highly esteemed the teachings of his former teacher, kabbalist Moses Cordovero. He maintained that Cordovero often appeared to him in dreams.

One of Vital's most prominent opponents was Menahem Lonzano, who publicly denounced him in his work Imrei Emet.

== Later life and death ==
On 20 Elul 1590, Vital received rabbinical ordination from his teacher Moshe Alshich. Four years later, in 1594, he settled permanently in Damascus, where he lectured every evening on the kabbalah. In 1604 Vital's sight began to fail; in 1620 he died while preparing to return to Safed. He was 77 years old when he died and was buried in the Jewish cemetery in Damascus.

On April 26, 2025, Vital's grave was dug up and desecrated by vandals.
