= Isaac Luria =

Rabbi and Kabbalist (c.1534–1572)

Rabbi Isaac Luria
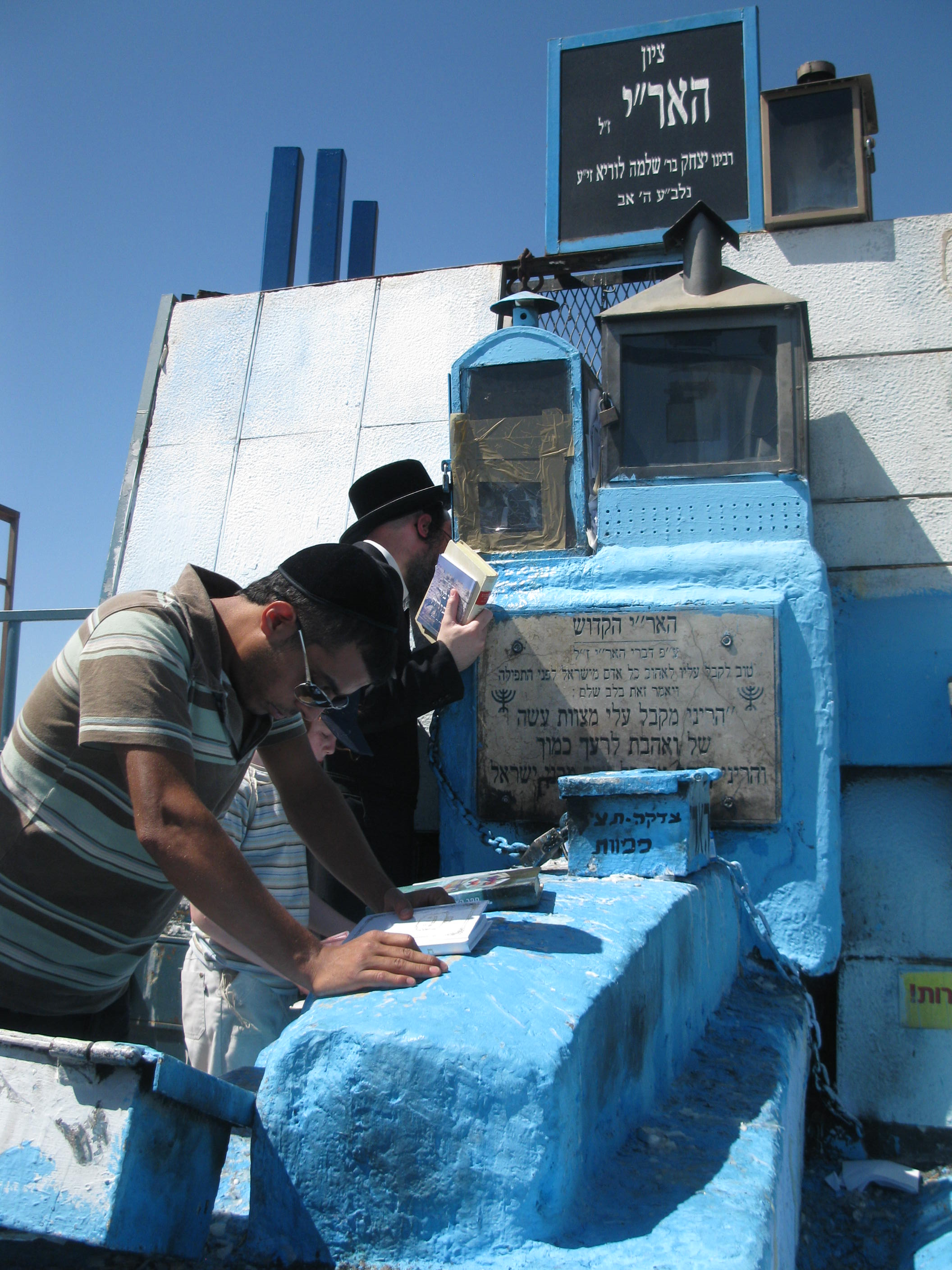
- The grave of Isaac Luria in Safed
- Title: Ha'ari; Ha'ari Hakadosh; Arizal

Personal life
- Born: 1534 Jerusalem, Damascus Eyalet, Ottoman Syria, Ottoman Empire
- Died: July 25, 1572 (aged 37–38) (5 Av 5332 AM) Safed, Damascus Eyalet, Ottoman Syria, Ottoman Empire
- Buried: Old Cemetery of Safed

Religious life
- Religion: Judaism

Isaac ben Solomon Ashkenazi Luria (Hebrew: יִצְחָק בן שלמה אשכנזי לוּרְיָא; born 5294 c. 1534 – died 5332, c. July 25, 1572), commonly known in Jewish religious circles as Ha'ari, (Note: Hebrew: האר״י, meaning "the Lion"; derived from the acronym for "Elohi Rabbi Itzhak" (the Godly Rabbi Isaac) or "Adoneinu Rabbeinu Isaac" (our master, our rabbi, Isaac). Sometimes known as the Ari in English.) Ha'ari Hakadosh (Note: Hebrew: האר״י הקדוש, meaning "the Holy Lion") or Arizal, (Note: Hebrew: אר״י ז״ל, meaning "the Lion of Blessed Memory") was a leading rabbi and Jewish mystic in the community of Safed in the Galilee region of Ottoman Palestine, now Israel. He is considered the father of contemporary Kabbalah. His teachings are referred to as Lurianic Kabbalah.

His direct literary contribution to the Kabbalistic school of Safed was extremely minute (he wrote only a few poems), however his spiritual fame led to their veneration and the acceptance of his authority. Luria's disciples compiled his oral teachings into their writings, and every custom of Luria was scrutinized; many were accepted, even against previous practice.

Luria died at Safed on July 25, 1572, and is buried at the Safed Old Jewish Cemetery. The Ari Ashkenazi Synagogue, also located in Safed, was built in memory of Luria during the late 16th century.

== Early life ==
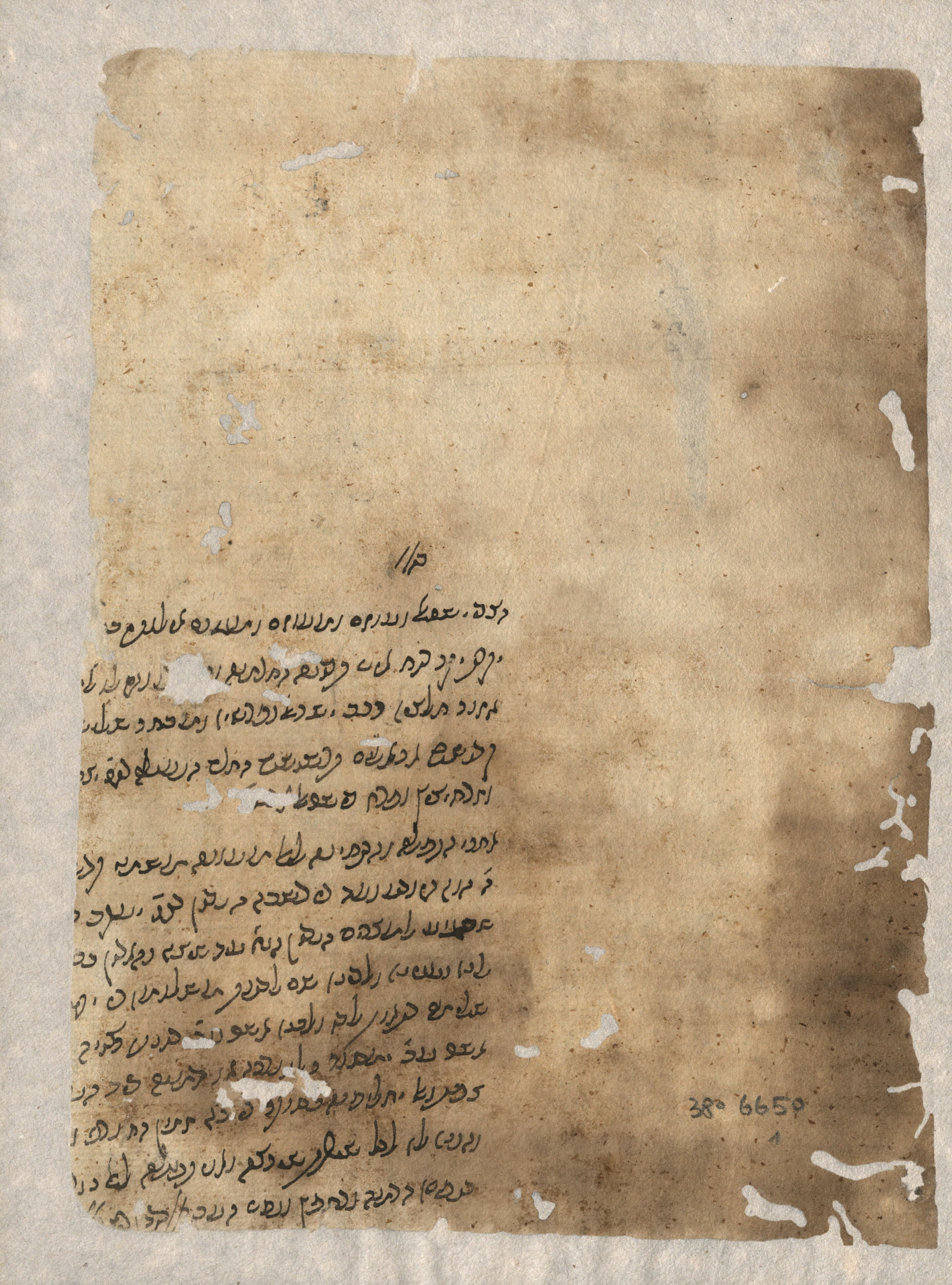
A letter sent to Luria while he lived in Egypt

Luria was born in 1534 in Jerusalem in what is now the Old Yishuv Courtyard to an Ashkenazi father, Solomon, and a Sephardic mother.

While still a child, Luria lost his father and was raised by his rich maternal uncle Mordechai Frances, a mültazim (tax farmer) from Cairo in Ottoman Egypt. His uncle placed him under the best Jewish teachers, including the leading rabbinic scholar David ben Solomon ibn Abi Zimra. Luria showed himself a diligent student of rabbinical literature and under the guidance of another uncle, Bezalel Ashkenazi, best known as the author of the Gathered Method (Hebrew: שיטה מקובצת), he became proficient in that branch of Jewish learning.

As a young man, he became engrossed in the study of the Zohar, a significant work of Kabbalah. Retreating to the banks of the Nile for years, he secluded himself in an isolated cottage, giving himself up entirely to meditation. He visited his family only on Shabbat. But even at home, he would not utter a word, even to his wife.

== Teachings ==
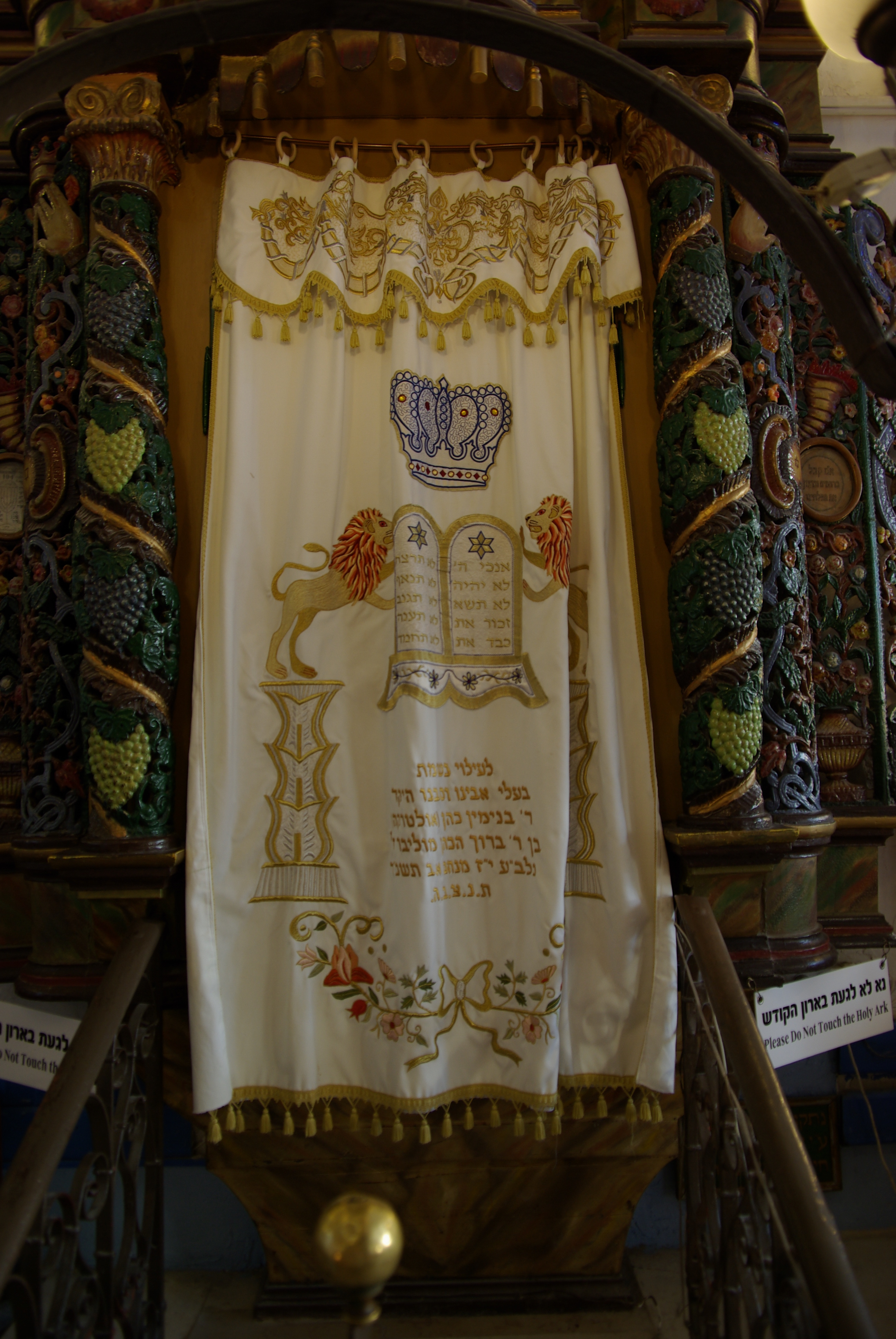
Ark in the Ari Ashkenazi Synagogue. Luria was called Ha'ari, "the Lion".

In 1569, Luria moved back to the Jerusalem Sanjak, and after a short sojourn there, where his new kabbalistic system seemed to have met with little success, he settled in the Safed Sanjak. Safed in the Galilee had become a center for kabbalistic studies over the previous decades, led by Moses ben Jacob Cordovero. There is evidence that Luria also regarded Cordovero as his teacher: Joseph Sambari (1640–1703), an Egyptian chronicler, testified that Cordovero was "the Ari's teacher for a very short time". Luria probably arrived in early 1570, and Cordovero died on June 27 that year (the 23d day of Tammuz). Bereft of their most prominent authority and teacher, the community looked for new guidance, and Luria helped fill Cordovero's former role.

Soon Luria had two classes of disciples: novices, to whom he expounded elementary kabbalah, and initiates, who became the repositories of his secret teachings and the formulas and intentions of prayer. The most renowned of the initiates was Hayyim ben Joseph Vital, who, according to his master, possessed a soul that Adam's sin had not soiled.

Many Jews who had been exiled from Spain following the Expulsion of Jews from Spain believed they were in the time of trial that would precede the appearance of the Messiah in Galilee. Those who moved to Damascus Eyalet in anticipation of this event found a great deal of comfort in Luria's teachings due to his theme of exile. Although he did not write down his teachings, they were published by his followers and by 1650 his ideas were known by Jews throughout Europe.

Luria delivered his lectures spontaneously, without ever writing down his ideas (with a few exceptions, including kabbalistic poems in rabbinical Aramaic for the Shabbat table). The foremost advocate of his kabbalistic system was Vital, who collected all the disciples' lecture notes. Numerous works were produced from these notes, the most important of which was the Etz Chaim, "Tree of Life", in eight volumes (see below). Originally, it circulated only in manuscript copies. Each of Luria's disciples had to pledge—under pain of excommunication—not to allow any copy be made for a foreign country, so that for a time all the manuscripts remained in Ottoman Syria. Eventually, one was brought to Europe and was published at Zolkiev in 1772 by Isaac Satanow. In this work, both the theoretical and the devotional-meditative teachings of Lurianic Kabbalah, based on the Zohar, are elaborated upon.

Tzimtzum was one of Luria's most important ideas that he stressed in his lectures.

== Disciples ==
- Hayyim ben Joseph Vital
- Israel Sarug
- Samuel ben Isaac de Uçeda

== Sources ==
- Fine, Lawrence (2003). Physician of the Soul, Healer of the Cosmos: Isaac Luria and His Kabbalistic Fellowship. Stanford, CA: Stanford University Press. ISBN 0-8047-4826-8.
- Matt, Daniel (2022). Becoming Elijah. Yale UP.
- Joseph ben Isaac Sambari (1994) [1-23-1673]. Sefer Divrei Yosef. Jerusalem: Ben Zvi Institute.
