= Tree of life (disambiguation) =

The tree of life a fundamental archetype in many of the world's mythological, religious, and philosophical traditions.

Tree of life may also refer to:

== Arts and entertainment ==
=== Film ===
- t.o.L ("trees of Life"), the collective pseudonym of the authors of the film Tamala 2010: A Punk Cat in Space
- The Tree of Life (film), a 2011 American film
- A Tree of Life: The Pittsburgh Synagogue Shooting, a 2022 American documentary film
- Charles Darwin and the Tree of Life, a British documentary television film
- Geedka nolosha, also known as The Tree of Life, a 1988 Somali short film

=== Literature ===
- Tree-of-Life, a fictional shrub in the Known Space universe
- Tree of Life (novel), 1992 novel by Maryse Condé
- The Tree of Life, a 1932 book by Israel Regardie
- The Tree of Life, a 1972 novel by Chava Rosenfarb
- The Tree of Life, a 1985 novel by Hugh Nissenson
- The Tree of Life, a 2005 novel by Mark Michalowski

=== Music ===
- Tree of Life (album), a 2013 album by Audiomachine
- The Tree of Life (Cecil Taylor album), 1998
- The Tree of Life (soundtrack), the soundtrack for the 2011 film The Tree of Life
- Tree of Life, a 2000 album by Lila Downs
- Jesus Christ the Apple Tree, also known as "The Tree of Life My Soul Hath Seen", an 18th-century poem and carol

=== Sculpture ===
- Tree of Life (Mexican pottery), a type of Mexican pottery sculpture
- Tree of Life (Kester), a 2005 sculpture by Kester, Hilario Nhatugueja, Fiel dos Santos, and Adelino Serafim Maté
- Tree of Life (sculpture), a 1964 sculpture by Lee Kelly and Bonnie Bronson
- The Tree of Life (sculpture), a 2012 sculpture by Josef Tabachnyk
- Tree of Life (Disney), a 1998 sculpture at Disney's Animal Kingdom theme park
- Tree of Life (White), a 2002 sculpture by Nancy Metz White
- Metaphor: The Tree of Utah, also known as Tree of Life, a 1986 sculpture by Karl Momen
- Trees of Life, 2013 sculptures in Managua, Nicaragua

=== Other uses in arts and entertainment ===
- The Tree of Life (module), a 1986 module for the Dungeons & Dragons role-playing game
- The Tree of Life (TV series), a Bulgarian television series
- The Tree of Life, Stoclet Frieze, a 1909 painting by Gustav Klimt
- Tree of Life mural (Manav Gupta), 2010
- A fictional tree in the 2008 video game Prince of Persia

== Biology ==
- Darwin Tree of Life, a project to sequence the genomes of eukaryotes in UK and Ireland
- Tree of Life (Bahrain), a tree in Bahrain
- Tree of life (biology), a metaphor, conceptual model, and research tool used to explore the evolution of life and describe the relationships between organisms
  - Phylogenetic tree, a graphical representation which shows the evolutionary history between a set of species or taxa during a specific time
- Tree of Life (Louisiana), a tree in New Orleans, Louisiana
- Tree of Life Web Project, an Internet project providing information about the diversity and phylogeny of life on Earth
- Arbor vitae (anatomy) (Latin for "tree of life"), the cerebellar white matter, so called for its branched, tree-like appearance
- Arborvitae (Latin for "tree of life"), a genus of coniferous trees or shrubs
- Adansonia, also known as a "tree of life", a genus of deciduous trees
- Árbol del Tule, also known as the "Tree of Life", a tree in Santa María del Tule, Oaxaca

== Religion and mythology ==
- Etz Chaim, a Hebrew term for "Tree of Life"
  - Tree of life (biblical), a tree at the center of the Garden of Eden
  - Etz Chaim (book), a 1573 book by Hayyim Vital
  - Tree of life (Kabbalah), a diagram used in Kabbalah
- Iso tammi, the world tree in the Kalevala
- Mesoamerican world tree, a motif in Mesoamerican religions and mythologies
  - Izapa Stela 5, also known as the "Tree of Life" stone
- Tree of life (Quran), the tree of life motif as it appears in the Quran
- Tree of Life Christian Schools, a Christian school in Columbus, Ohio
- Tree of Life Foundation and Rejuvenation Center, an American Jewish organization founded by Gabriel Cousens
- Tree of Life – Or L'Simcha Congregation, a Conservative Jewish synagogue in Pittsburgh, Pennsylvania
- Tree of life vision, a vision by Lehi and Nephi in the Book of Mormon
- Yggdrasil, the world tree in Norse religion and mythology

== See also ==
- Arbor vitae (disambiguation)
- Tree of death (disambiguation)
