= List of phrases containing the word vitae =

Vitae is a Latin word, meaning or pertaining to life.

- Aqua vitae, archaic name for a concentrated aqueous solution of ethanol, distilled spirits
- Arbor vitae (disambiguation), "tree of life"
- De Brevitate Vitae, work of Roman philosopher Seneca
- Curriculum vitae or CV, summary of education and job experience, résumé
- Deus Vitae, manga series created by Takuya Fujima
- Evangelium Vitae, encyclical by Pope John Paul II
- Humanae vitae, encyclical by Pope Paul VI
- Liber Vitae, medieval confraternity book
- Lignum vitae, species of plant in the creosote bush family
- Magistra vitae, Latin expression from Cicero's De Oratore, "history is life's teacher"
- Non scholae, sed vitae discimus, Latin phrase, "We do not learn for the school, but for life."
- Sodalitium Christianae Vitae, society of apostolic life founded by Luis Fernando Figari
- Speculum Vitae, Middle English poem possibly by William of Nassyngton
- Vitae duorum Offarum, literary history written in the mid-thirteenth century
