= Mythili Prakash =

American Bharatanatyam dancer

- Born: July 6, 1982 (age 44); Los Angeles, California, U.S
- Occupations: Choreographer, Bharatanatyam Dancer
- Years active: 2004-Present
- Dancing career
- Current group: Mythili Prakash Dance Ensemble
- Website: www.mythiliprakash.com

Mythili Prakash is an American dancer and choreographer specializing in Bharatanatyam, a classical dance form originating in Southern India. Recognized as one of the world’s leading young exponents of Bharatanatyam, her classical, yet inventive approach revitalizes the physicality, musicality and expressive theatricality of the dance to create an exceptional style that is distinct and meaningful to audiences across the world. In Life of Pi, she made a cameo appearance at the film's conclusion as the titular character's wife and mother of their children.

== Early life and education ==
Hailed a child prodigy, Mythili began her career as a Bharatanatyam performer at the age of 8 and has toured throughout the world, performing in prestigious venues and festivals. Mythili was trained by her mother, Bharatanatyam exponent Viji Prakash, and also had the opportunity to study with several legendary stalwarts from India. She is now under the mentorship of acclaimed danseuse Malavika Sarukkai. Mythili Prakash graduated from UC Berkeley with a bachelor's degree in Mass Communication but committed to Bharatanatyam full-time in 2004.”

== Career in Bharatanatyam dancing ==
Mythili, divides her time between Los Angeles and Chennai. A regular performer during the Madras Music Season, Mythili has performed as a soloist for many respected institutions of dance in India including The Music Academy, Krishna Gana Sabha, Narada Gana Sabha, Kalakshetra (Chennai), Sri Shanmukhananda Sabha (Mumbai), India International Centre (Delhi)and Chowdiah Memorial Hall (Bangalore). Critics describe her as “Suave and Contemporary… a happy blend of Western Stagecraft and Indian Aesthetics. Mythili has toured the United Kingdom, France, and Singapore, and has performed at prestigious arts venues such as The Lowry, Manchester; and Musée Guimet, Paris, and Esplanade Theatres on the Bay, Singapore. She has also performed as a lead dancer of Shakti Dance Company, Los Angeles at venues such as the Lincoln Center, New York; Wortham Centre, Houston and New Jersey Performing Arts Centre, New Jersey.

== Awards and accolades ==
- In January 2009, she was featured on NBC's Superstars of Dance
- as a Bharatanatyam soloist, introducing her art form to mainstream audiences all over the world.
- Mythili has received much critical acclaim for both her solo and group choreography.
- She received the Creation to Performance Grant from the Irvine Dance Foundation for her highly acclaimed work Stree Katha, the tragic heroines of the epic Ramayana, which has toured the United States, Canada, Europe, India, and Singapore.
- She is also a recipient of the Artistic Innovation Grant from the Center for Cultural Innovation for her work, Shakti- the Sacred Force.
- Mythili, is the recipient of the “Devdasi National Award” (Bhubaneswar 2011), “Nadanamaamani Award” from Karthik Fine Arts (Chennai 2009), “Yuva Kala Bharati” from Bharat Kalachar (Chennai 2007), the “Sanskriti Nrithya Puraskar” of Sanatan Sangeet Sanskriti (Delhi 2007), and the Chandrasekharan Endowment Concert at Music Academy (Chennai 2007), to name a few.
