= Forked cross =

Y-shaped cross

Forked cross

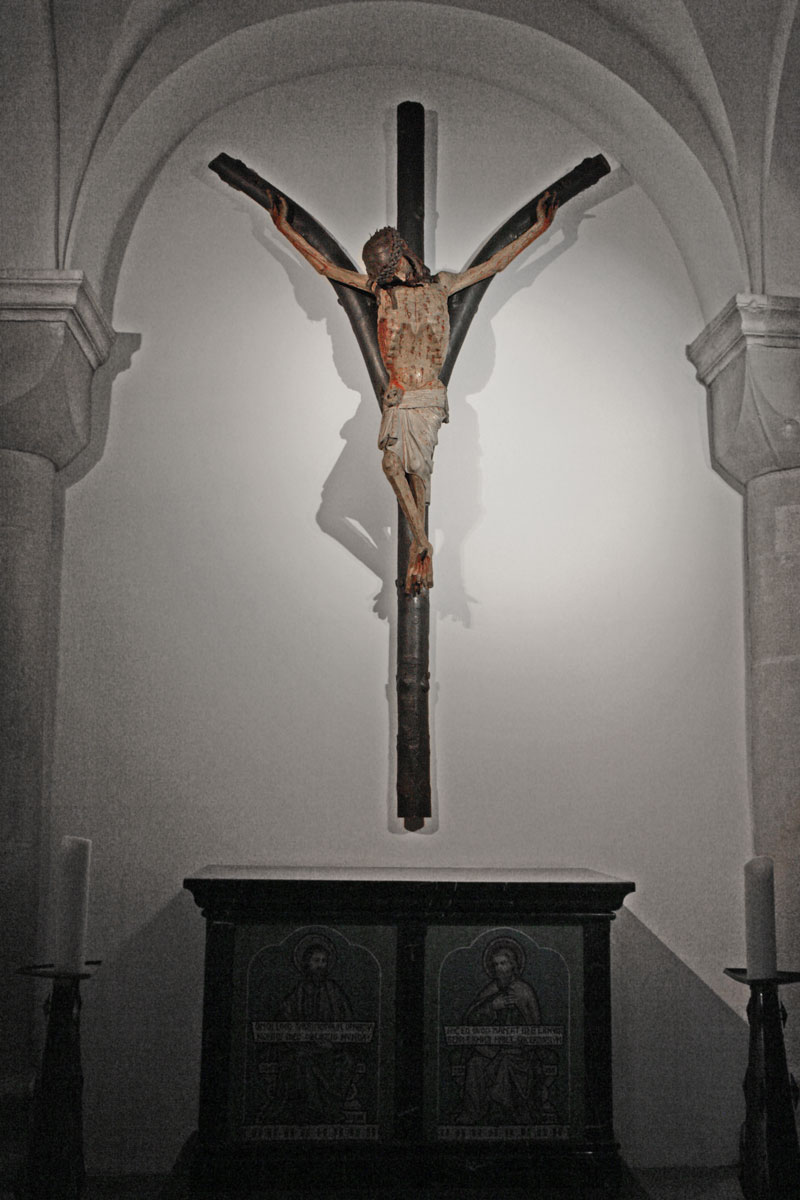
Forked cross in St. Mary's in the Capitol, Cologne

A forked cross, is a Gothic cross in the form of the letter Y that is also known as a crucifixus dolorosus, furca, ypsilon cross, Y-cross, robber's cross or thief's cross.

According to recent research, the forked cross emerged under the influence of the mystics in the late 13th or early 14th century and is especially common in the German Rhineland, where it is also called a Gabelkreuz ("fork cross"), Mystikerkruzifix ("mystic's cross"), Gabelkruzifix ("fork crucifix"), Schächerkreuz ("robber's cross"), or Pestkreuz ("plague cross").

== Description ==
It is believed that the forked cross represents a tree, or more precisely, the Tree of Knowledge, which brought sin into the world. However sin was defeated by the suffering of Jesus on the cross at Calvary.

Typical of the mystic crucifixes is the body of Christ hanging on a Y-shaped tree fork with his head falling low over his chest, his mouth contorted with pain and his eyes full of tears. His narrow, sinewy arms stretch more upward than sideways, his thin body is strongly bent and deeply sunken below the breastbone, with prominently protruding ribs and a gaping wound in his side. Fingers and toes are spread apart and spasmodically bent. The overall impression of the painted figure was intended to be so horrific that believers would be in fear and terror. It is recorded that in 1306 the Bishop of London removed a mystic crucifix for this reason.

== Emergence ==
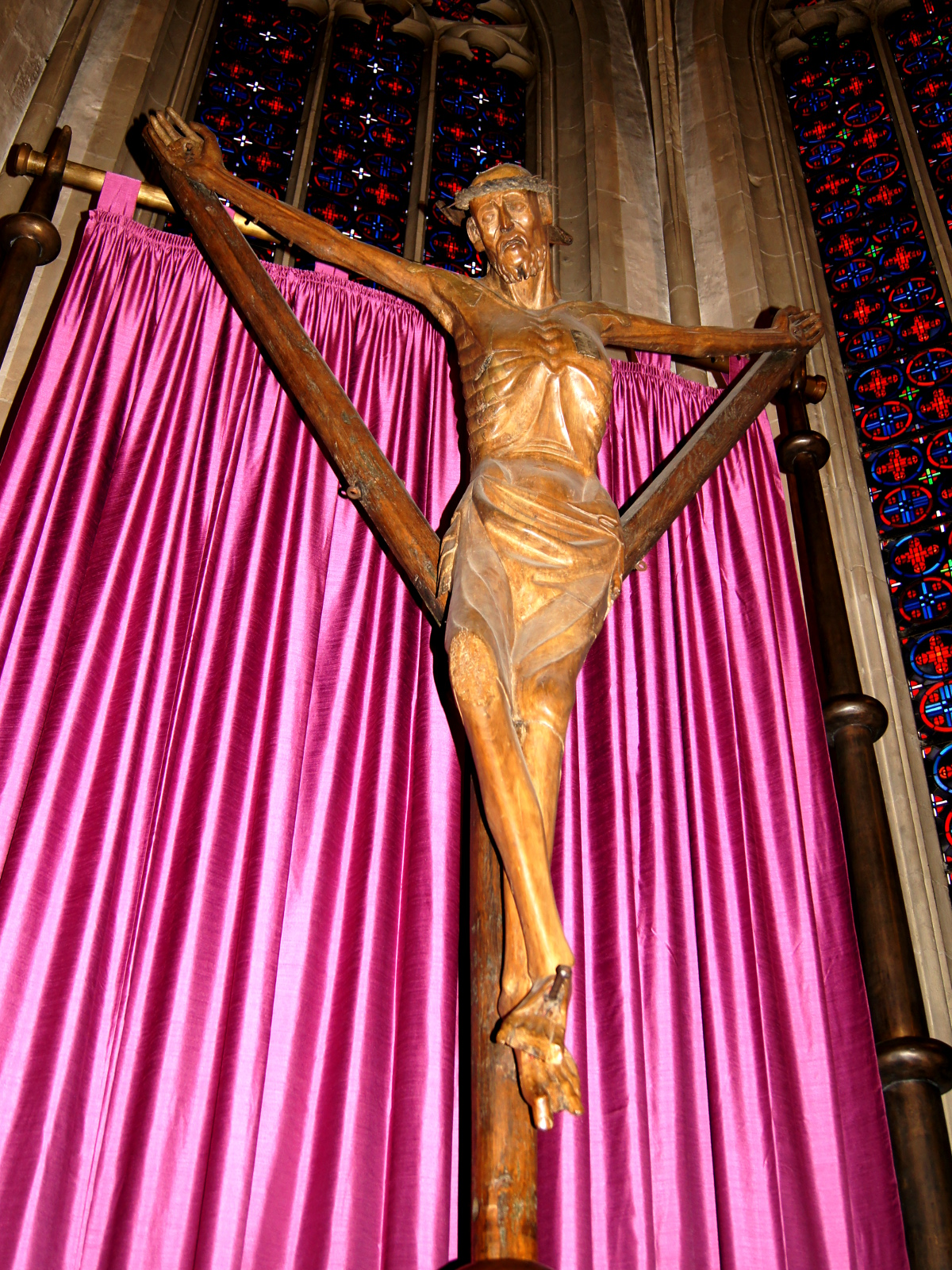
The Coesfeld Cross

Religious currents of the 13-14th century developed, under the influence of mysticism, a piety centred on Christ's Passion, which expressed itself in this image form that portrayed Jesus' suffering in a particularly graphic way. In art history, the technical term crucifixus dolorosus has come to be used, a term introduced by Geza de Francovich. Gothic passion crucifixes often use forked crosses, but not in all cases. Quite a few hang on Latin crosses. But they are almost always in the form of branches that recall the Tree of Life. The aforementioned term "plague cross" (Pestkreuz) is misleading, since crucifixi dolorosi appeared soon after 1300, i.e. before the outbreak of the great plague in Western Europe. Little is known about their original function. What is certain is that the Coesfeld Cross had already been carried through the town during processions from the beginning. Many forked crosses are found in places run by the Dominican and Franciscan orders, especially in Italy.

Not until the Counter-Reformation did people begin to honour the crosses in many places with a special procession. Often the two thieves will appear on a forked cross, while Jesus is depicted hanging on a straight beam. Hence the alternative name of "robber's cross" or "thief's cross" (Schächerkreuz).

== Distribution ==
The forked cross in the church of St. Mary's in the Capitol in Cologne was thought for a long time to be the oldest forked crucifix. Restoration work revealed, however, that it was not the original prototype for all forked crosses, but that this crucifix may have been the catalyst for the popularization of this type of cross in the Rhineland.

The cross at St. Mary's in the Capitol was carved in the 14th century (before 1312). Restoration work in recent years revealed much of the late medieval, second painting (Zweitfassung). Small sections of the exposed, first painting revealed astonishing similarities with the original coat of paint of the Bocholt Cross, once again visible since 1967, which used the Cologne Cross as a prototype, even though different sculptors were employed.

The crucifixus dolorosus from St. Mary's in the Capitol bears very little similarity with the style of the Rhenish and Cologne sculptors of its time; it appears to be a singular work of outstanding quality. It is therefore questionable whether this forked cross was created by a Cologne wood carver. Even the other sculptures of this type in Germany appear to be by "foreign" craftsmen when compared with the local art of their particular region. They only had a limited, local following. On the other hand, artistic links to crosses in other countries can be recognised. Especially clear is an Italian influence. Thus it is possible that the original forked crosses are imported pieces, or that they were carved by itinerant craftsmen, which may explain why local walnut wood was used for the crucifix of St. Mary's in the Capitol.

Another early example of these mystic crucifixes, besides the one in St. Mary's in the Capitol, is that in St. Severin's Church in Cologne. Other, later crosses exist in Haltern, Bocholt, Borken and in St. Lambert's, Coesfeld. The crucifixes in St. Simon and St. Jude's in Thorr (Bergheim county), St. John's in Lage/Rieste (Lower Saxony), the cross in St. Peter's Church, Merzig and the crucifix in the Roman Catholic parish church of St. John the Baptist in Kendenich (Hürth) also belong to this group.

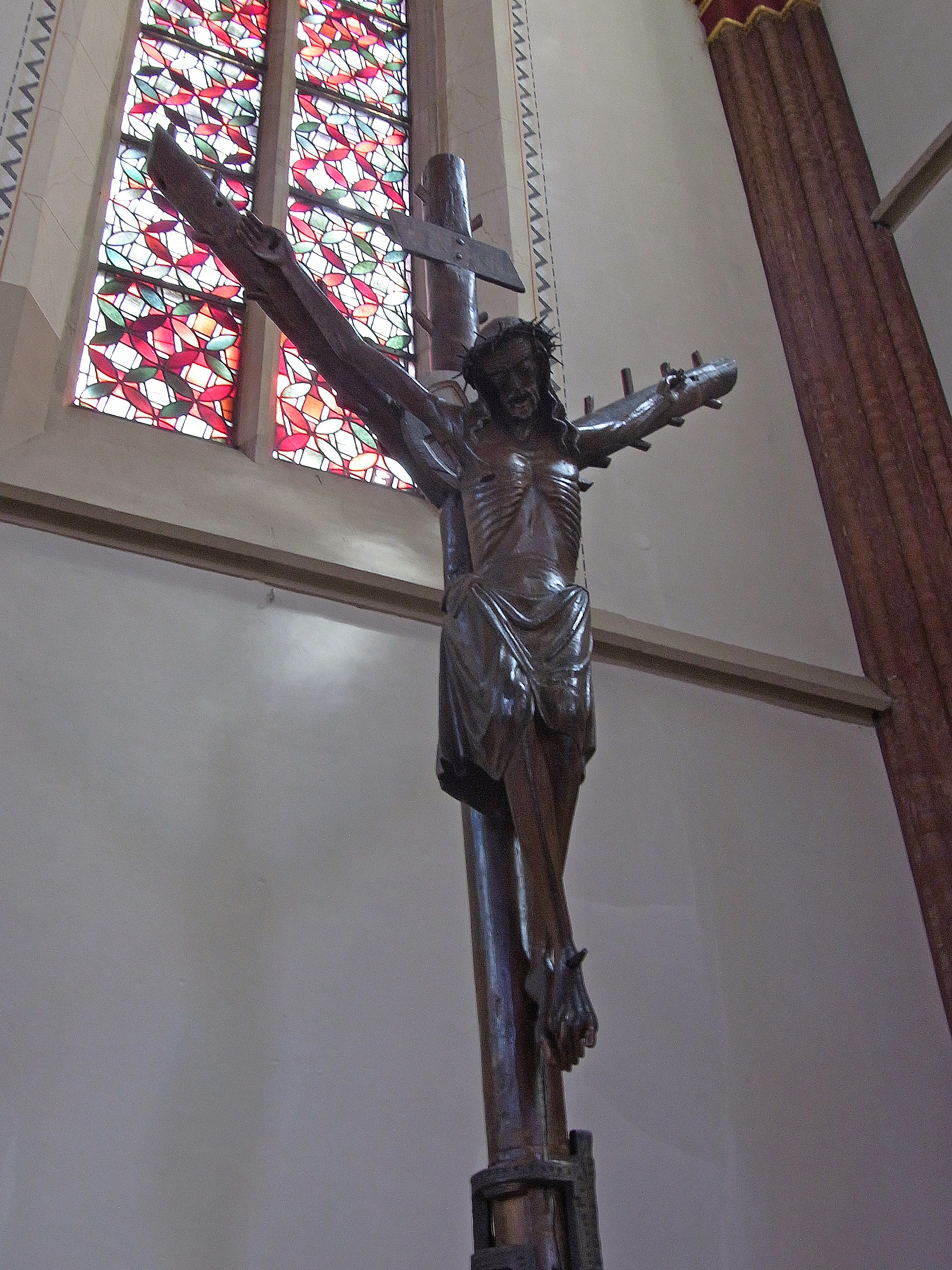
The Haltern Cross

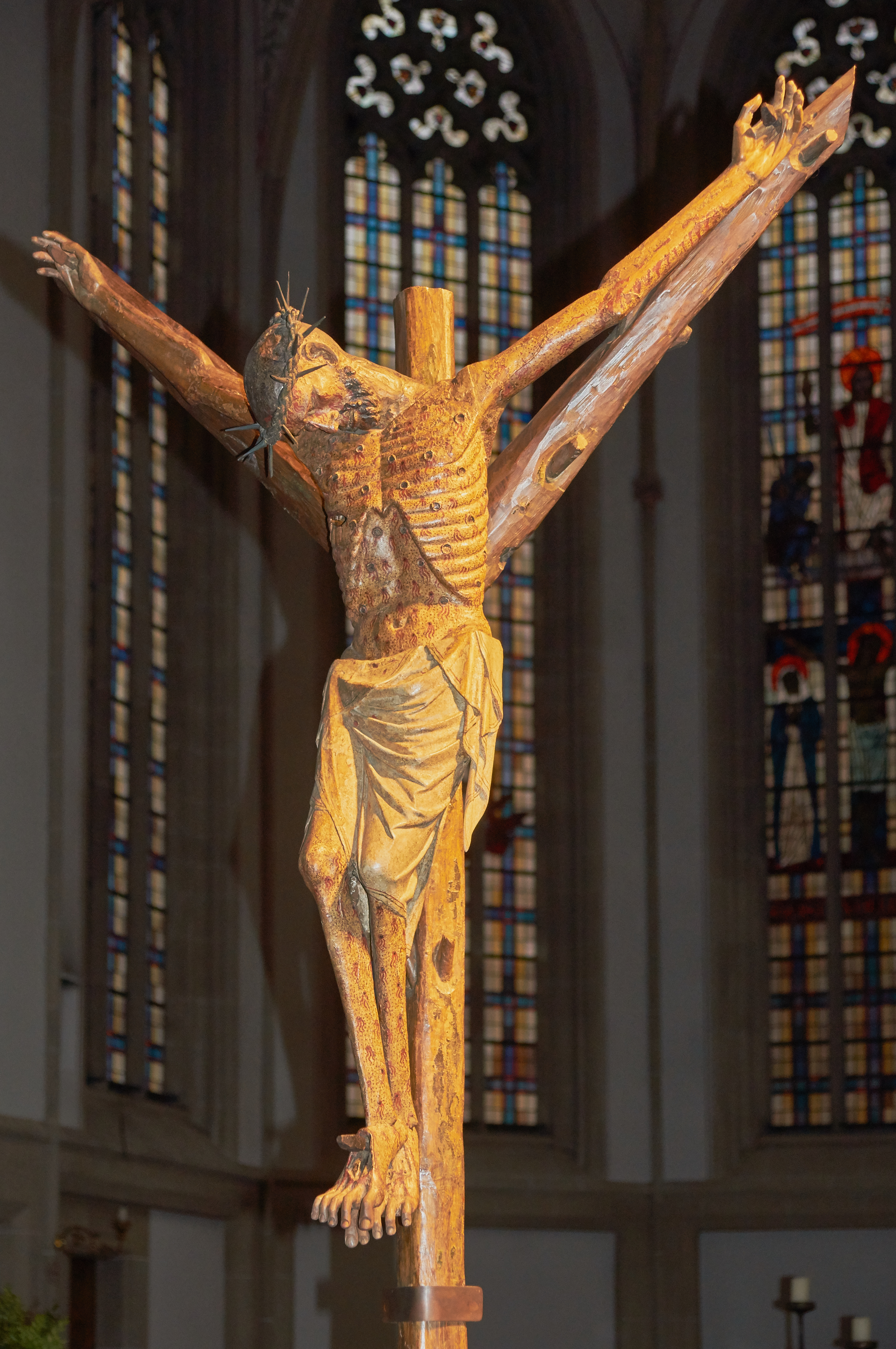
The Bocholt Cross.

These sorts of crucifix are also found, albeit in much smaller numbers, in other European countries, not just in Italy, but also in Switzerland and in Upper Austria and in Spain.

== Heraldry ==
The "pall"

In heraldry, the pall is a charge that resembles a forked cross. Its diminutive is known as a shakefork. However, the pall is thought to derive from an ecclesiastical vestment, the pallium.

== Literature ==
- Monika von Alemann-Schwartz: Crucifixus dolorosus. Beiträge zur Polychromie und Ikonographie der rheinischen Gabelkruzifixe. Bonn, 1976 (Bonn, Univ., Diss.).
- Géza de Francovich: L'origine e la diffusione dell crocifisso gotico doloroso. In: Kunstgeschichtliches Jahrbuch der Bibliotheca Hertziana. 2, 1938, ISSN 0258-557X, pp. 143–265.
- Godehard Hoffmann: Das Gabelkreuz in St. Maria im Kapitol zu Köln und das Phänomen der Crucifixi dolorosi in Europa. Werner, Worms 2006, ISBN 3-88462-240-4 (Arbeitsheft der rheinischen Denkmalpflege 69 = Studien zu Kunstdenkmälern im Erzbistum Köln 2).
- Felix Liebermann: Ein deutscher Bildhauer in London 1306. In: Repertorium für Kunstwissenschaft. 33, 1910, ISSN 0259-7063, p. 550.
- Fried Mühlberg: Crucifixus Dolorosus. Über Bedeutung und Herkunft des gotischen Gabelkruzifixes. In: Wallraf-Richartz-Jahrbuch. 22, 1960, ISSN 0083-7105, pp. 69–86.
- Max Strucken: Literarische und künstlerische Quellen des Gabel-Kruzifixus. Strucken, Düsseldorf, 1928 (Cologne, Univ., Diss., 1928).
