= Bocholt Cross =

14th-century crucifix in Germany

Coordinates: 51.838182°N 6.61416°E

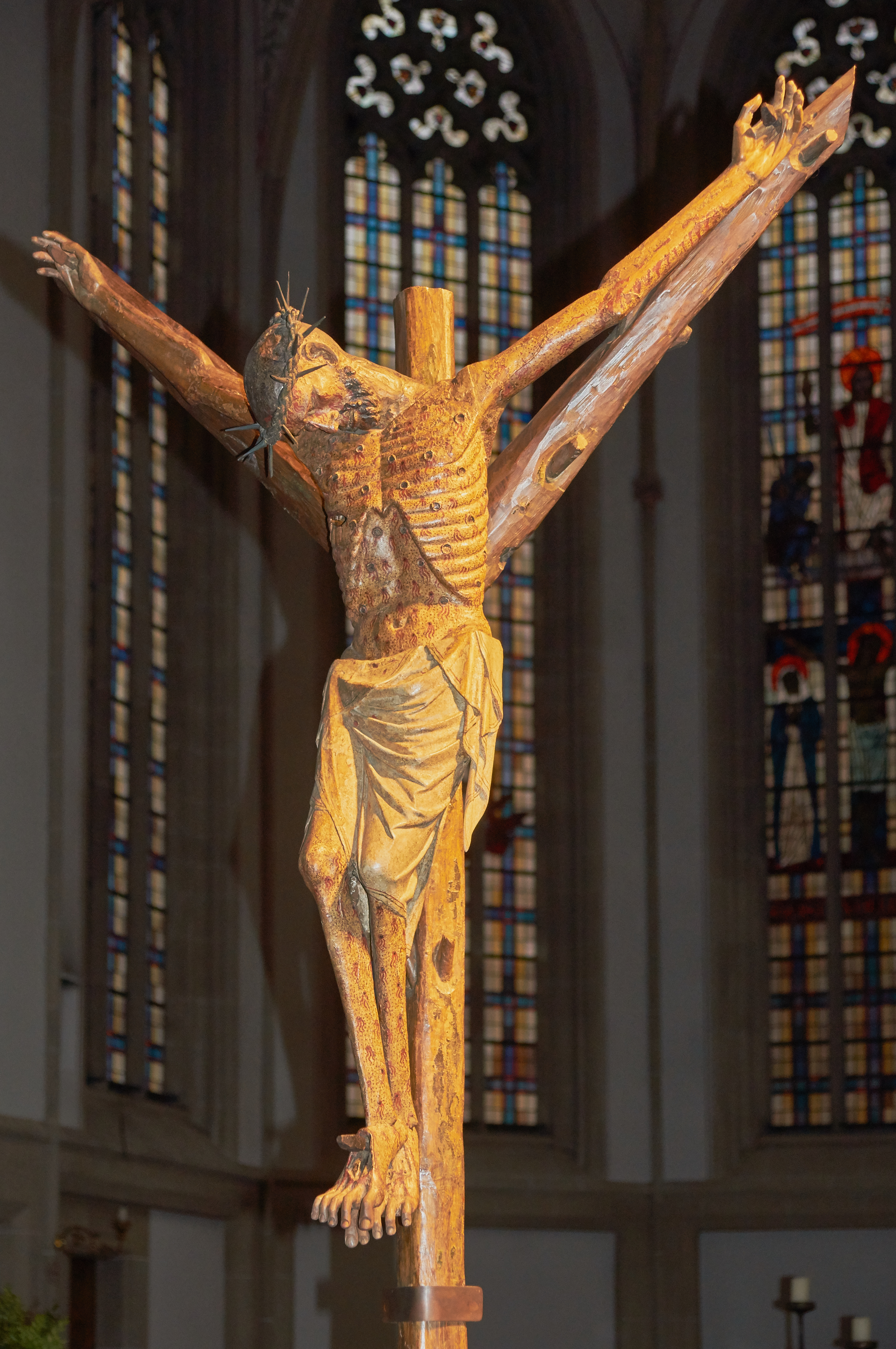
The Bocholt Cross

The Bocholt Cross (German: Bocholter Kreuz) is a forked crucifix in St. George's Church in Bocholt, in the German state of North Rhine-Westphalia and dates to the early 14th century. It is the oldest and most significant ornament of this church and the focal point of a regional pilgrimage today.

== Description ==
The design of the crucifix was based on the forked cross at St. Maria im Kapitol in Cologne. The depiction of the body, that is the way in which the wounds caused by the scourge are portrayed, is almost identical. It is carved out of fir wood and measures 153 cm (60") in height, the arms of the cross extending higher than the vertical post of the cross. The upright is only a little higher than the head of Christ and there is therefore no titulus. The body is made of walnut and is 102 cm (40") high, the arm span is 97 cm (38"). The arms and head have been separately attached. The smooth 'skullcap' suggests that, originally, there was a wig of hair on the head. As a base for the artwork, the cross (i.e. the body of Christ) is covered with linen and has been hollowed out. In the interior are four relics, the origin of which is either totally unknown or can only be loosely estimated: a bone wrapped with silk which cannot therefore be identified, two human ribs and a light brown stone, probably from the Holy Land (the hill of Golgotha?) The relic compartment has not been re-opened since the cross was made. The post of the cross was originally painted green, this alluded to the Biblical tree of life symbolism. As a repository of relics the cross was referred to over the centuries as an altar of the Holy Cross. During the Neo-Gothic restoration in 1860 the Bocholt Cross, as part of a mercy seat was integrated into the high altar. Today it stands near the communion altar in a pedestal.

== See also ==
- Forked cross
- Coesfeld Cross

== Literature ==
- Hans-Rudolf Gehrmann: 700 Jahre Bocholter Kreuz. Faltblatt. Bocholt, 2015 (pdf; 294 kB).
- Pfarrei St. Georg Bocholt: Die Geschichte des Bocholter Kreuzes. Andachtszettel zum Bocholter Kreuz (online).
