= Coesfeld Cross =

14th-century crucifix in Germany

Coordinates: 51.94595791°N 7.16874003°E

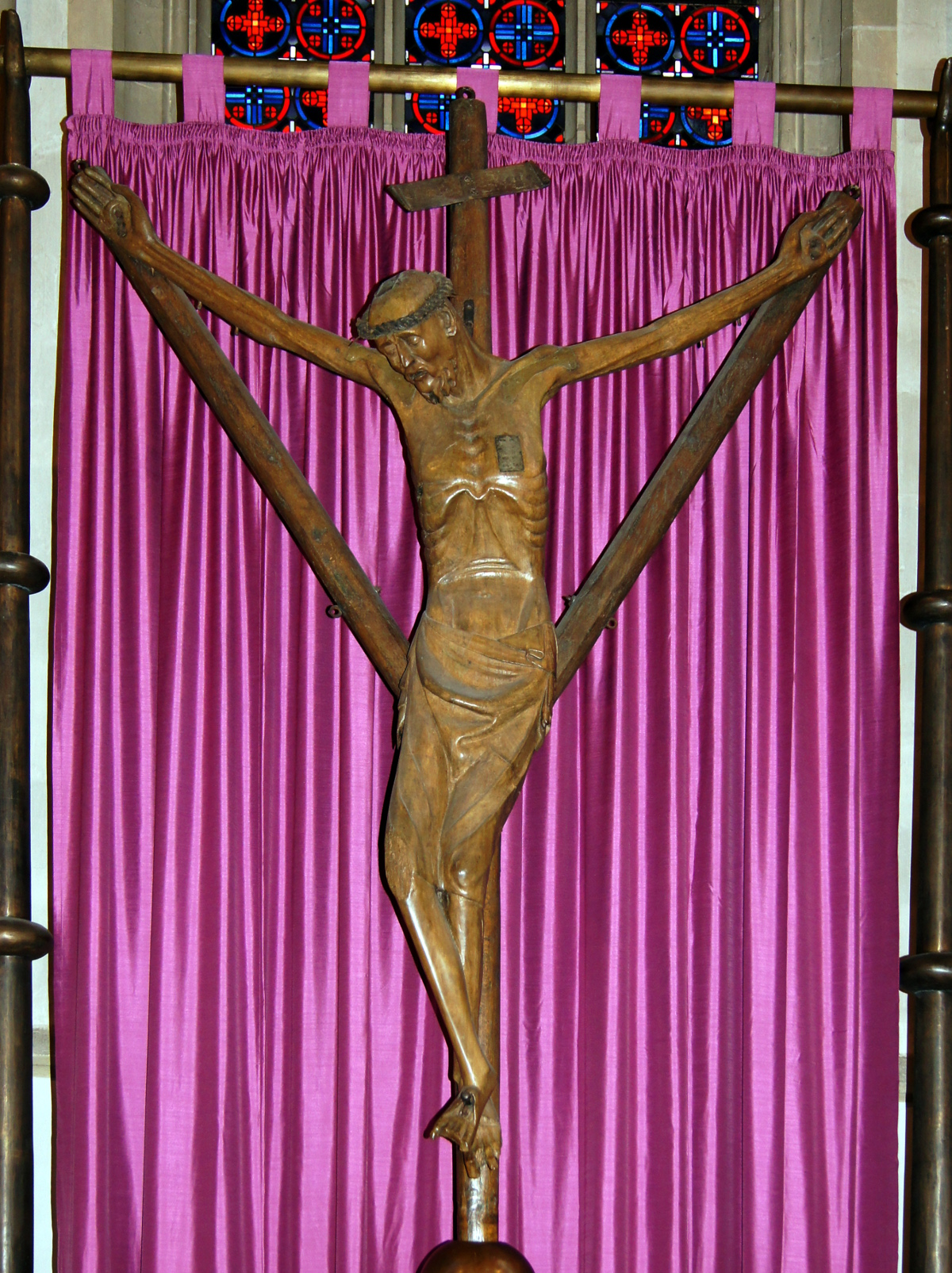
The Coesfeld Cross

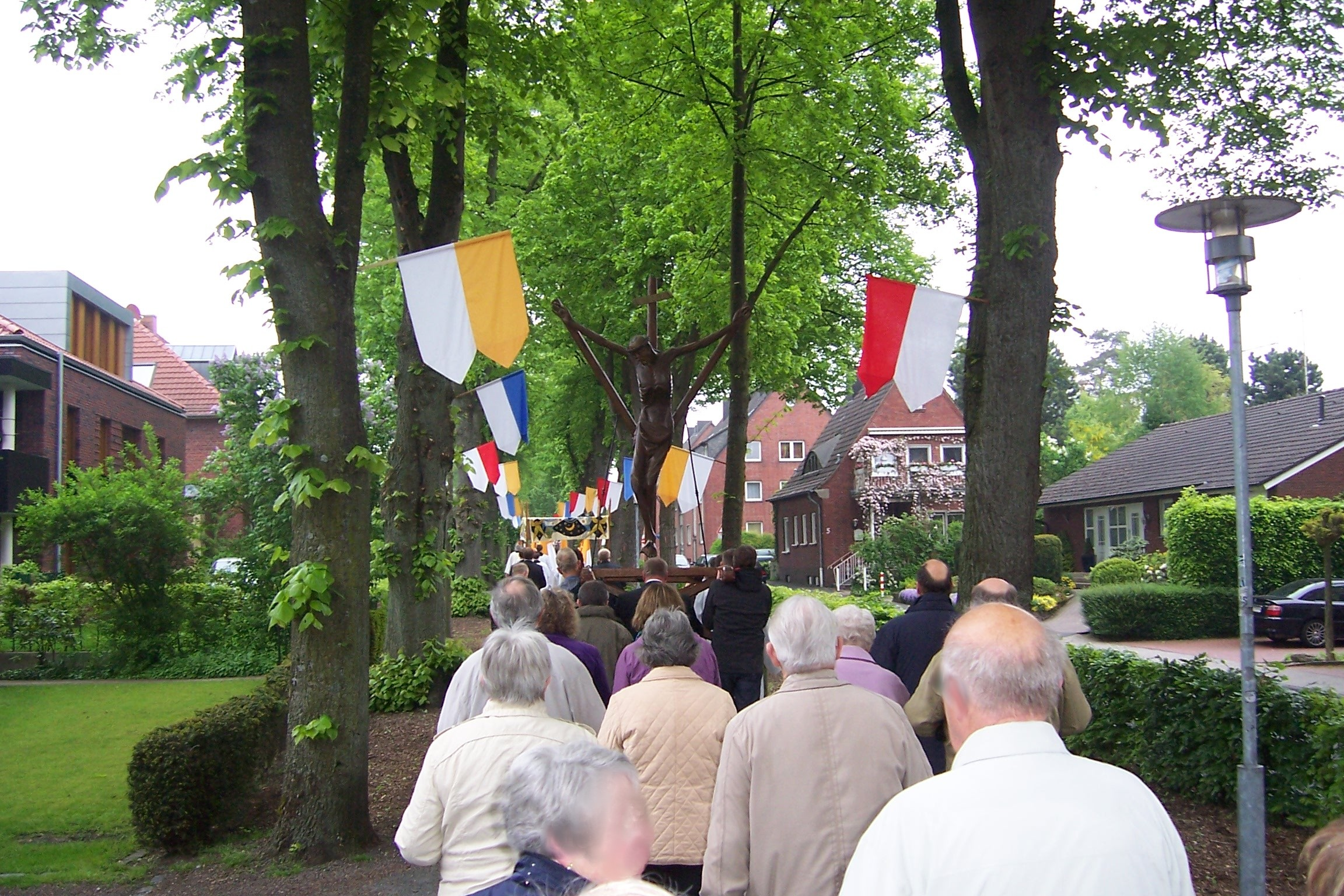
The Coesfeld Cross on a banner-lined path.

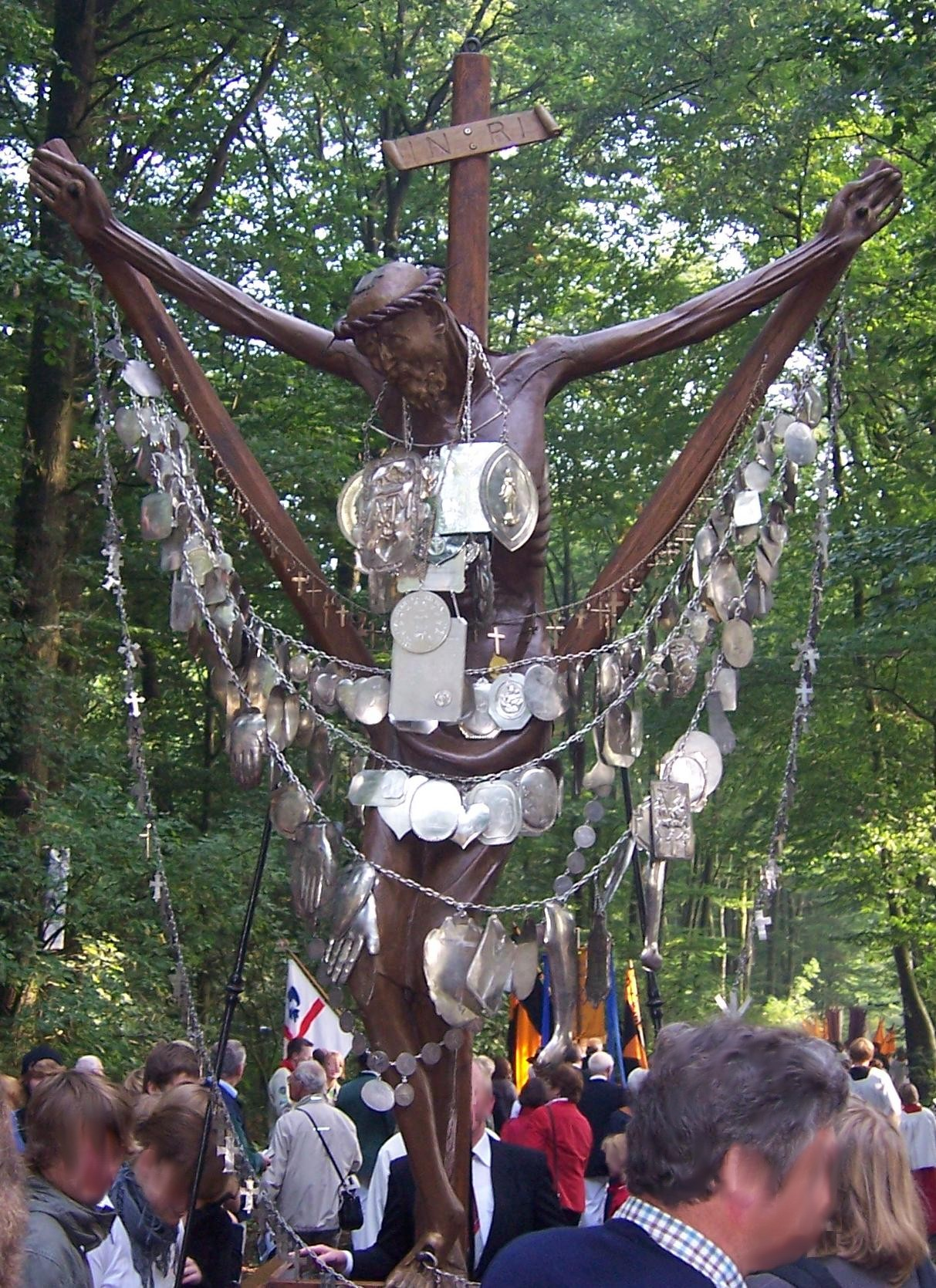
Replica of the Coesfeld Cross with votive offerings

The Coesfeld Cross is a forked crucifix located in the Church of Saint Lambert in Coesfeld.

It is the largest of its type in Germany and is especially noted for its graphically clear portrayal of Christ's suffering. The cross is 3.24 metres high and 1.94 metres wide; the figure of Christ is 2.09 metres tall and has an arm span of 2.09 metres. The torso, which was made in the 14th century, was carved by an unknown artist from walnut wood; from a single trunk of at least 48 centimetres in diameter. The sculptor used oak wood for the arms, and the two beams of the cross. The present smooth surface was originally embellished with wounds and veins made of filler and had a more sculpted appearance as well as being painted. The head appears rather small in proportion today, because it no longer has any of the original hair, which was made of tow and glue. Holes have been bored in the left breast and head in order to attach various relics, including a True Cross relic. Hence, from quite early on, the Coesfeld Cross was believed to possess miraculous properties and was the destination of many pilgrimages. A cross is still at the heart of the tradition today. For the various festivals known as Kreuztrachten, streets and houses along the route of the procession are decorated with flags and pennants, not dissimilar to the custom in other Roman Catholic regions.

== Historic development of the Coesfeld Cross rituals ==
An early testimony to the veneration of the cross in Coesfeld is a letter of indulgence dated 1 July 1312, in which participants in the cross festival were to be granted a special indulgence. As a result, the pilgrimage experienced a significant increase in popularity, and donations and offerings for the holy cross grew. In 1359, a fund paying an annual sum of two shillings was established in order to finance the votive candles burnt in honour of the Coesfeld Cross, and, from 1425, a Confraternity of the Holy Cross is recorded. Even in the religious turmoil of the 16th century reform-minded pastors were unable to prevent ordinary folk from continuing to venerate the cross. The initial decline in its ritual worship began with the attacks of Spanish and Dutch mercenaries on the western Münsterland during the time of the Eighty Years' War and consequent plundering and impoverishment of the population. A low point was the siege of Coesfeld by (Protestant) Hessians in 1633 which brought the cult of the cross and pilgrimages to a halt. On 25 February 1634, Hessian (Calvinist) soldiers took possession of the Coesfeld Cross and "made fun of it in order to please their officers". Only a year later, it was returned into the hands of the townsfolk of the Coesfeld who thenceforth hid the cross in the attic of a house on the market square. Hessians continued to occupy the town until four years after the end of the Thirty Years' War when, in 1652, Prince-Bishop Christoph Bernhard von Galen secured their withdrawal for a large sum of money.

The prince-bishop promoted the pilgrimage financially and morally, by personally participating in the cross festivals and initiating a great, annual, celebratory thanksgiving procession, called Hessenutjacht, that made its way around the ramparts of the town of Coesfeld at Pentecost. He also donated a new altar of the Holy Cross in the Church of Saint Lambert and had the so-called "Great Way of the Cross" (Großer Kreuzweg) laid out. After the death of Galen, veneration of the cross declined again, fires left the townsfolk impoverished, so that it is unlikely that any more processions were held during this period and, although on 23 June 1727 Pope Benedict XIII granted all the worshippers of the Coesfeld Cross a plenary indulgence, it was little visited as a pilgrimage destination. It took the cross anniversary in 1756 before its popularity resurged. Subsequent anniversaries in 1806, 1850 (!) and especially in 1902, following the political oppression of the Roman Catholic Church during the Kulturkampf, saw the number of outside pilgrims rise sharply again. Even the Nazis could not initially suppress participation in the cross festivals and processions until 12 May 1940 when all processions were prohibited for "air defence reasons". The first cross celebrations after the war took place at Pentecost 1945, but due to the destruction of Coesfeld in March 1945, there was no festival; this did not take place again until 1946. Its next anniversary in 1950 was celebrated again without interference, but since then the Coesfeld Cross has not been the destination of outside processions. Since 1982, the Coesfeld Cross has remained for conservation reasons in St. Lambert's Church and a replica was made for the procession. The last cross anniversary took place in 2000 in the light of changed social relations as well as ecumenical progress.

== Gallery ==
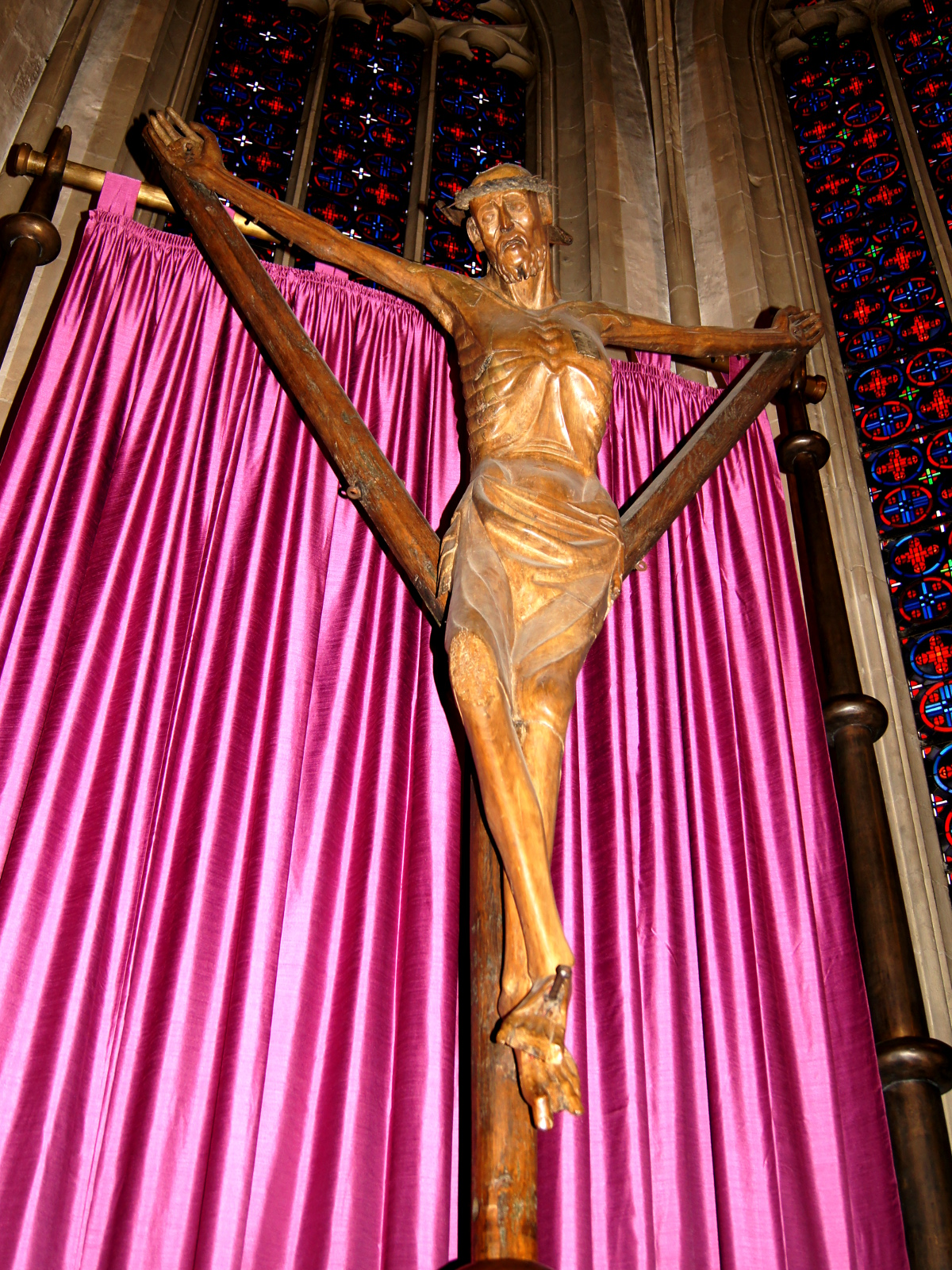
Looking up at the cross.

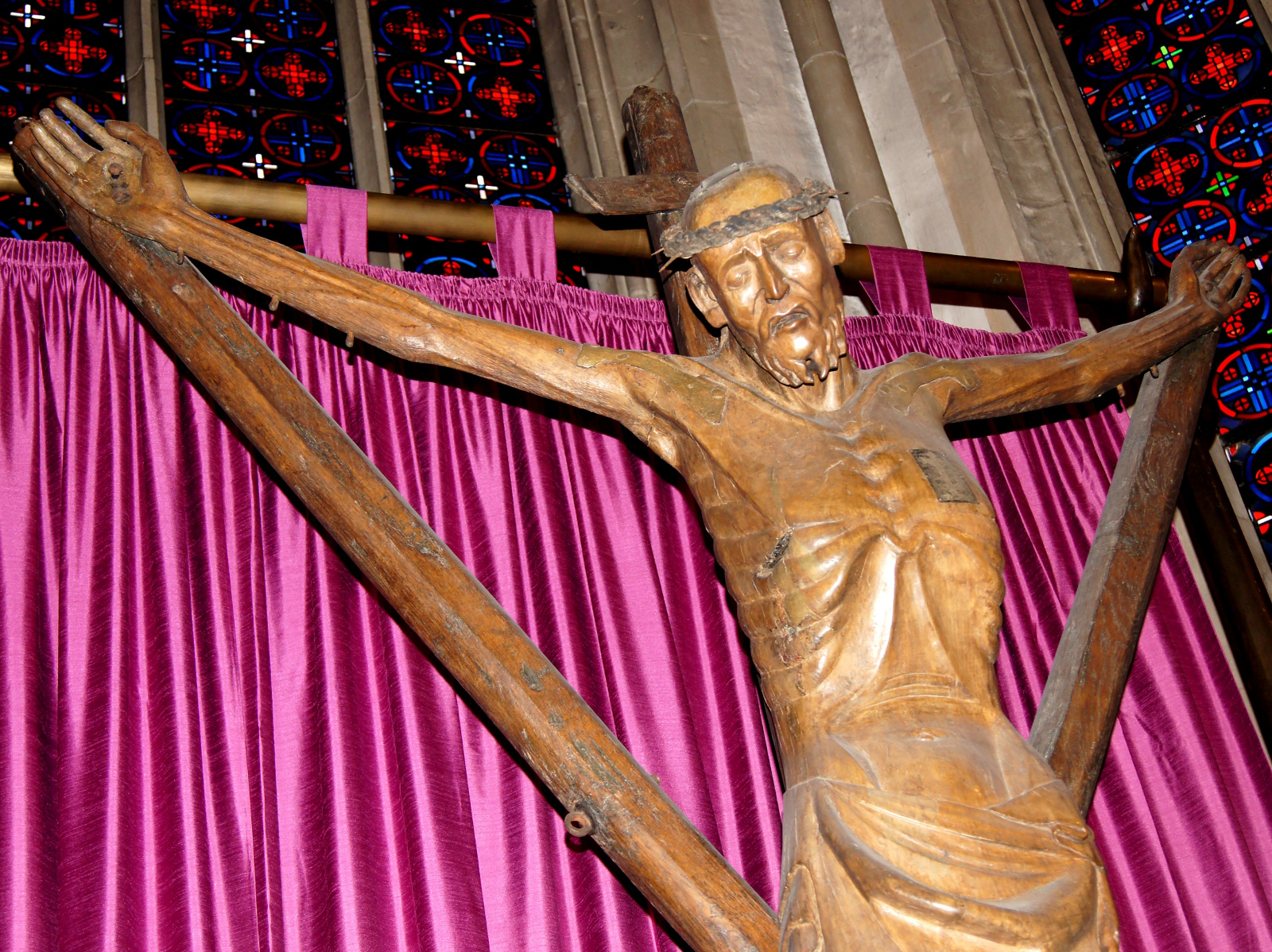
Close-up showing relic compartment in the breast.

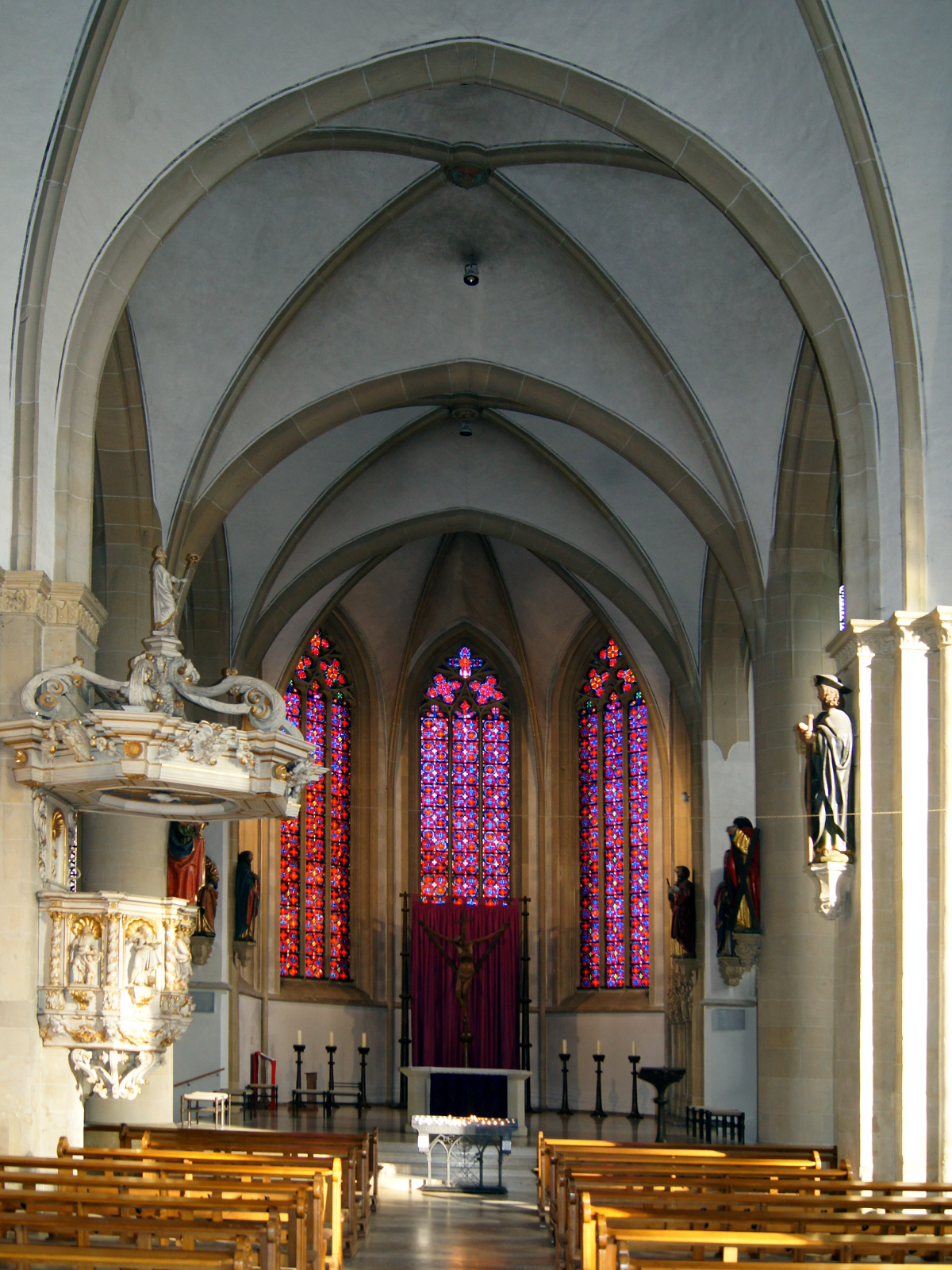
St. Lambert with the Coesfeld Cross in the choir.

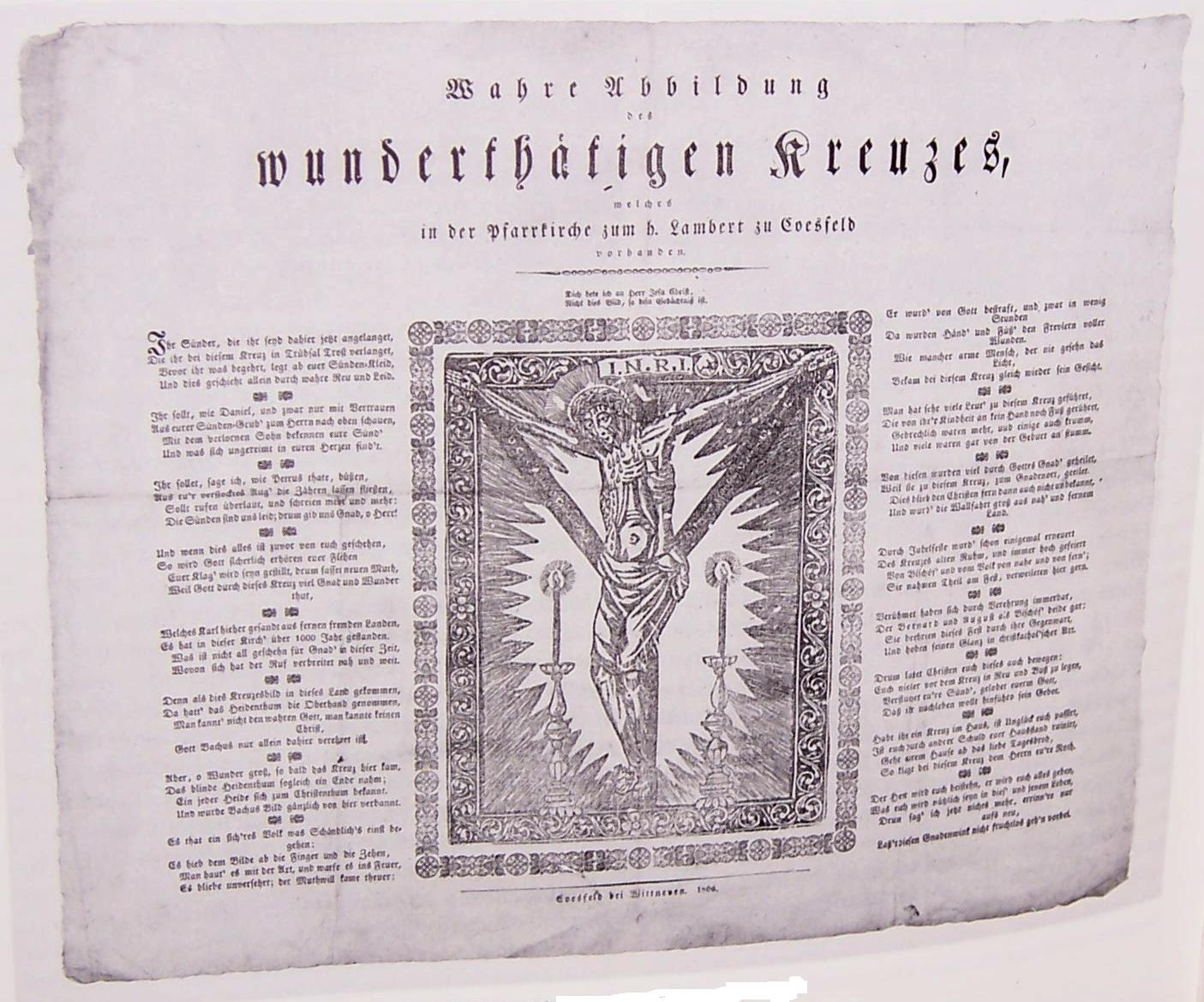
Prayer sheet from the 1806 anniversary.

== See also ==
- Forked cross
- Bocholt Cross

== Literature and sources ==
- Daniel Hörnemann (2000), Das Coesfelder Kreuz (in German), Münster: Dialogverlag, ISBN 3933144299
- Hüsing, Pfarrer (1950), Das Heilige Kreuz in der St.-Lamberti-Kirche (in German) (7. ed.), Coesfeld: J. Fleißig
