= Manav Gupta =

Indian artist

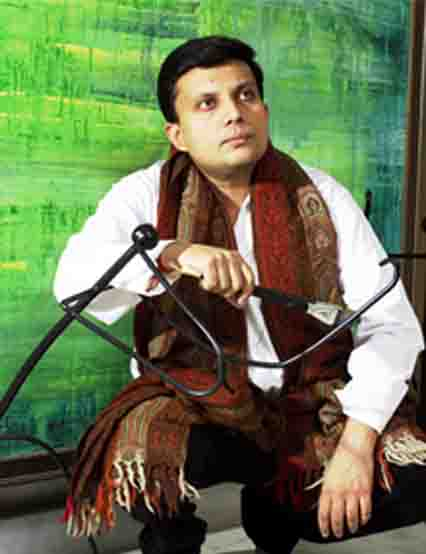
- Born: 29 December 1967 (age 58); Kolkata, India
- Education: Academy of Fine Arts; Presidency College
- Known for: Conceptual Art, Installation Art, Public Art, Sculptures, Paintings, Murals, Performance Art, Films, Poetry
- Notable work: Tree of Life; Rainforests; River; Rain; Beehives; Hourglass - Time Machine; Bed of Life; Noah's Ark; Environmental Films; Water-the New Gold
- Movement: Avante Garde, Conceptual Art, Contemporary Art, Public Art
- Awards: First Artist to receive the Sanatan Kalakriti Puraskar, by the French Ambassador (2006); Senior Fellowship, Ministry of Culture, Government of India (2019)
- Website: manavgupta.in

Manav Gupta (born 29 December 1967) is an Indian contemporary artist known for paintings, installations and large-scale public art projects on environment consciousness and sustainable development. He has reinvented the identity of rural Indian clay pottery and redeployed various other material like construction scrap to create site specific, contemporary art and environmental installations and sculptures. He has been acknowledged as one of the most versatile and erudite contemporary artists to come from India and is widely cited as a 'maverick genius' and a 'visionary'.

Gupta has developed multiple layers of interdisciplinary public-engagement programmes alongside his installations and exhibitions, with other art forms, and outreach programmes with students, educational institutes, the general public as all stakeholders of society, to raise awareness through his 'arth – art for earth' programmes on sustainable living with the message of "respecting the true wealth of life on earth", with recurring episodes of 'Dialogues at the waterfront' at his various public art projects.

For the period of 2010–2019 Gupta worked independently via invitations by institutions who hosted his work. He created the following consecutive solo public art projects that were critically acclaimed: 'unsung hymns of clay – shrinking river bed on museum floor'(2013), National Ditsong Museum, Pretoria, South Africa; "Rain the Ganga Waterfront along Time Machine"(2015), India Habitat Centre, New Delhi, India;, "Excavated Museum in a Mall" (2017), DLF Mall of India, India, 'arth – art for earth, travelling excavated museum'(2018) IGNCA, Ministry of Culture, Govt. of India 'Public art museum on Water, Water- the New Gold, City in a city'(2019) Rasulgarh, Bhubaneswar. The decade ended with Gupta being credited with having created some of the most iconic and revolutionary public art projects in India.

Gupta has used his paintings, poetry, music and sound to produce one-minute films on climate change, sustainable development, ecosystems and alternate energy for public service messages commissioned by the Ministry of Environment & Forests, Government of India (2005–2006, 2011).

Critical writing about Gupta has consistently emphasised the environmental focus of his practice and his use of vernacular pottery. The Patriot, in a 2025 World Environment Day feature, described him as 'a pioneer of environmental public art in India' who has been 'often hailed as the father of repurposing ceramics into large-scale environmental sculptures'.

He has also been a pioneer in co-creation with his "Jugalbandis" (Collaborations) with musicians, poets and dancers across the world, where he translates a performing artist's oeuvre live on stage on his canvas (2003–2011).

He has co authored a book of poems and paintings with former President of India Dr A.P.J. Abdul Kalam, published by Penguin India.(2002–2005).

Gupta has created single edition sculptures and public-art installations with varied media including iron, steel, wood, discarded roots of trees, glass, recycled scrap metal, ceramics and clay (terracotta).

Gupta trained at the Academy of Fine Arts, Kolkata, under Rathin Maitra and Vasant Pandit, and is based in New Delhi.

== Life and career ==
=== Childhood and early life ===
Gupta was born in Calcutta, in a middle-class family and raised by his mother since around the age of six. His mother was a professor in a college while his father was the deputy director of the National Library of Kolkata. From the age of thirteen he gave tuition to younger children to support his mother and continued doing so through his time at Presidency College. Gupta's family resided in the staff quarters of the National Library Campus where he would spend his early childhood and formative years in the horticulture gardens. He found solace in Nature, which played a pivotal role in shaping his expression of art. He was gifted his first box of colours at the age of 1, where he started expressing himself in the form of poetry and paintings; by sketching and painting precise elements of nature by age 5: namely branches of trees and tree trunks.

Gupta's talent was noted early. He received several awards and certificates in the field of painting from educational and cultural institutions from the period of 1977 to 1989. While exhibiting his artworks in four group exhibitions at the Academy of Fine Arts in the same period. Gupta gained attention for his poetry and art as he started getting published in newspapers and journals from the period of 1986 to 1991. Gupta's poem "Echoing Parables" was selected and published in the journal of the London Book Fair entry from India in the year 1988. In 1991, Gupta's poem was published in the Calcutta observer. Gupta graduated from Presidency College and worked in private corporate organisations to support his family before formally beginning his full-time art career in 1996.

=== 1996–2002 ===
In 1996, Gupta held his first solo exhibition at the Birla Academy of Art and Culture, Kolkata. While all the conventional halls were booked, Gupta chose to exhibit his paintings in the lawns of the academy. The location was unconventional because at the time, the idea of watercolours on paper being hosted outdoors was not heavily practiced. In the evening when the lights were lit, Gupta's artworks stood out, attracting visitors in hundreds. This also ended with his first solo being his first 'sold-out' exhibition. Amongst the attendees were B. K. Birla and Sarala Birla who purchased two of his artworks which later went to the permanent collection of the academy. In 1997, at his second solo, 15 to 17 August, The Taj Bengal, Kolkata hosted his exhibition "freedom to be different". It was his public dissemination of environment consciousness through art. A theme and project close to him as it had a vital effect on his childhood. The exhibit consisted of single edition sculptures and installations created out of discarded roots and tree trunks that were showcased alongside a series of Gupta's miniature artworks called the "earth series." He received critical acclaim from art critics and Indian media houses.

Gupta moved to New Delhi in 1998, where his breakthrough in the Indian contemporary art market occurred at the Capital, in the year 1999, when he had a sold-out solo exhibition called "India awaiting – Timeless Metaphors of Dreams" hosted by The Taj Palace, New Delhi. His works were subsequently exhibited at premises of the Dep. of Culture, H.R.D Ministry, Govt. of India. He was nominated on the Expert Committee, National Republic Day celebrations, Ministry of Defence, Govt of India, as a member to be a part of the committee. Gupta's works were exhibited at The Roosevelt House, U.S. Ambassador's residence in New Delhi in 2001. In the same year, he was invited on the formative advisory panel of the Museum of Natural History, Government of India.

Gupta pioneered live performance art in India, as "Jugalbandis" where he translated the musician's performance live on stage from a blank to a finished canvas syncing his brush strokes to the performing artist's recital/instrument. One such collaboration with Shubha Mudgal resulted in a painting auctioned to raise funds for the NGO Amitasha. He was commissioned by The Times of India and the Amity Foundation to produce works on leadership presented as awards to Kumar Mangalam Birla and K.V. Kamath Gupta's 2002 exhibition at the Leela Palace, Bangalore, was inaugurated by Ram Jethmalani, Shatrughan Sinha and Ramakrishna Hegde.

"Sparks", a book of Shiela Gujral's haiku poems and the artist's paintings, whose design was conceptualised by Gupta as a work of art, was published during the same time.

His association with former President of India, Dr A.P.J. Abdul Kalam in 2002 began when he was invited to translate the poem "A National Prayer" on his canvas. On seeing the completed work, Kalam placed the painting at his office, all through his tenure, with a miniature model of the 'charkha' in front. The painting went on to become the cover of the book, "The Life Tree", published by Penguin. The book marks an extensive collaboration between Kalam and Gupta with a series of paintings that the artist created interpreting Kalam's poems. Gupta became the first artist in residence at the Rashtrapati Bhawan as he was invited to stay in the Family Wing for a week to paint the Mughal Gardens and work on the project. At the President of India's inaugural address at the Golden Jubilee celebrations of the National Gallery of Modern Art, Kalam shared his experience, praising the artist extensively.

=== 2003–2009 ===
In 2003 Gupta established his commitment to sustainable development and climate change by starting his movement on environment consciousness on World Environment Day. He raised awareness on the same by co-opting public participation in his art at his exhibition hosted by the Park Hotel, New Delhi. He pioneered an outreach programme as a call to all stake holders of society to "plant a sampling on my canvas". Beginning with the President of India to the Former Prime Minister of India, Dr I K Gujral and the then Chief Minister of Delhi, he mobilised a large section of society from the government, corporate industries, art and culture, to educational institutions and children from NGO's to co create art with him as a metaphor of accepting responsibility as consumers of Earth's resources. In 2004, his works were displayed at Victoria Jones, London for which he created a dedicated series 'from beyond'.

Continuing his outreach series at his exhibition 'stop a while' 'from beyond' in 2005, at the Lalit Kala Academy, New Delhi, he invited several children and head of educational institutions from different schools of Delhi to take his movement further. He extended the outreach to his works hosted by Rahstrapati Bhawan in the same year. He became the only artist to have been commissioned for one-minute films as public service messages on environment by the Ministry of Environment & Forests, Government of India where he deployed his paintings, poetry, music and voice over to conceptualise and create one minute and thirty second films for television on climate change, sustainable development, ecosystems and alternate energy.

Gupta was awarded the Sanatan Kalakriti Puraskar presented to him by Dominique Girard, French Ambassador to India in 2006. In the same ceremony, he carried out a performance art concert with Dr. L Subramanium. Christie's auctioned his work "Umbilical Cords of Earth" in New Delhi in the month of December of that year.

In 2007, Gupta had his first edition of his 'travelling trilogy' in Muscat, Oman consisting of his paintings, environmental film screenings and his performance art. His concert series included 'jugalbandi's' with Anup Jalota, a contemporary dance troupe and musicians with special needs, and with Rahul Sharma, Rakesh Chaurasia and Vijay Ghate, as three separate performances respectively, to raise funds for the Gonu victims of Oman. Gupta received critical acclaim for his exhibition and projects in Oman. Select works from that exhibition are also in the Permanent Collection of the Royal Family of Oman. His Highness Shihab bin Tariq al-Said quoted the following excerpt at Gupta's exhibition hosted by the Omani Society of Fine Arts: "I was very delighted to have had this moment to view Manav Gupta's work at the Oman Fine Art society exhibition. This is great work of a famous Artist from India which for us Omanis is an addition to our cultural knowledge. I wish Manav a successful tour of Oman and we look forward to seeing more of his very fine work." The exhibition at OSFA was inaugurated by Darwish bin Ismail bin Ali Al Balushi, Secretary General, Minister of Finance, Abdul Razak Ali Issa, CEO of Bank Muscat & Anil Wadhwa, Indian Ambassador to Oman. Gupta also gave lectures and talks on Art and Sustainability one of which was hosted by Bank Muscat. Earlier that year, his work "Non Limiting Horizons" was auctioned by Bonhams, London. Later that year he was commissioned by Hitachi, Singapore for a Limited Edition Copyright of his works for their plasma screens.

During the 2009 United Nations Climate Change Conference, Copenhagen Summit , CNN-IBN broadcast a serialised documentation of Gupta's work in progress on the painting ‘Copenhagen Wall of Hope’ ., framed as a response to [[climate change]]. Towards the end of 2009, the Indian Council for Cultural Relations hosted a solo exhibition in New Delhi as the opening of its newly renovated gallery, marking the curtain-raiser for a tour of his second ‘trilogy’ exhibition series to US and Europe, ‘On My Eyot – Rainforests and the Timeless Metaphors of Dreams.’ The Pioneer, along with Hindustan Times and Delhi Times covered an exclusive feature on Gupta and the exhibition acknowledging Gupta's work on the environment and climate change movement. An excerpt from Pioneer: The climate change summit at Copenhagen might have ended but the issue continues to exist in the works of artist Manav Gupta whose paintings displayed at an exhibition talk about climate change at large, our association with our roots and also with Mother Nature and the earth. Gupta said "The whole idea is to depict climate change that goes much beyond the political affairs, nationalities and other issues. It concerns the whole human race."

=== 2010–2019 ===
5000sq ft, six-floor high mega mural conceptualised and created by Manav Gupta at Bharti Airtel Ltd

In the first half of 2010, Gupta was commissioned by Bharti Airtel, where he created "The Tree of Life", which went on to become the tallest and largest indoor staircase mural in India. It was inaugurated by Sunil Bharti Mittal. After his three-month project at the Bharti Airtel Headquarters in Gurgaon, the artist carried the second edition of his traveling trilogy: "on my eyot – rainforests & the timeless metaphors of dreams" His works, extending to paintings and installations, films and performance art along with public collaborations on his canvases, were exhibited in New York, Des Moines, Amherst, San Francisco, Berlin, and London. While on tour he was invited for talks and lecture demonstrations by the San Jose State University, the Cultural Diplomacy Institute, Berlin and other local venues like the Des Moines Social club.

In 2011 he was commissioned by the Ministry of External Affairs, Govt of India to conceptualise an Indo Bhutan friendship mural as the Indian Government's contribution to the BIFA Museum in Pheuntshilling, Bhutan. He delineated Bhutan–India relations as an archival documentation after exhaustive research. The work consists of a suite of eighteen feet and twelve feet high canvases mapping the political, socio-cultural, spiritual and natural geography of commonalities between the two countries. The is now in the permanent collection of the BIFA building in Pheuntsholing, Bhutan. Post the installation of the work he was invited by His Highness to the Palace where the King shared moments of the royal Couple with the artist. Inspired by their story, Gupta created Her Highness's portrait with idioms from life instances of the Royal couple. The painting is now a part of the permanent collection of the Royal Household of Bhutan.

Gupta's coined his movement on environment consciousness, 'arth – art for earth' in 1996. His movement consisting of paintings, short films and sculptures; now took shape as contemporary clay installations in 2013, where he redeployed everyday pottery objects of terracotta clay into installations. He created the 'shrinking river' doing a 'Duchamp' on them, inverting 'earthen lamps' in his 'unsung hymns of clay' series at his exhibition 'rainforests and the circle of life' hosted by the Indian High Commission and Incredible India in Ditsong National Museum of Natural History, South Africa. He was invited for lectures at UNISA & Pretoria University. The exhibition was extended as a BRICS Summit outreach and travelled to Cape Town and Grahams Town. Later in the same year, Limca Book of Records released four records in their 2013 edition for the artist.

In 2014, the artist created an hour glass using earthen cups – the 'Time Machine' along with 20 ft High Canvases from his 'Umbilical Cords' series at Aerocity, New Delhi for their permanent collection. In the latter half of 2015, Gupta researched further for 3 months at Minneapolis, Des Moines, New York, Washington DC and Miami on his installation series where he redeployed clay pottery to take note on audience reactions at different venues gathering and drawing similarities between the important socio-cultural connects of people and practices with their respective rivers- 'how Indians pay homage to their rivers with earthen lamps and how people deposit tobacco as a form of an offering to Mississippi.' He gave a talk at Minneapolis College of Art and Design as part of the President's Lecture Series and Forecast Public Art. Earlier in 2015, he created his first 'River' at his exhibition titled "Rain, the Ganga Waterfront along Time Machine" where he made a 75 ft length x 60 ft width x 45 ft height of diyas (Earthen Lamps), Kulhads (Earthen cups) and Chillams (Indian rural cigar) to depict the river Ganga at the Plaza steps, for a 3-month exhibition at the India Habitat Centre in New Delhi. It was this Site-Specific, Avant-garde installation and his unique engagement with space and architecture that revived Gupta's critical acclaim and recognition in the Contemporary Art Market. Viewership had a record hundred-thousand 'footfalls' for Gupta's public art. The installation proved to be a game changer for Gupta, as he was credited as a 'thinker and visionary', and as 'one of India's most erudite and versatile contemporary artists' by international institutions, daily newspapers and magazines and national newspapers in India. Outlook (Indian magazine) cited him in their article as "pipped to be the next big thing in art". Ministry of External Affairs (India), took to twitter to write about Gupta as India's Soft Power, later talking about Gupta's art in the Magazine Issue. Gupta's career long process of engaging with all stakeholders of society to have meaningful conversations through engagement with his art that brings awareness about climate change, environment consciousness and sustainable development was launched by him in the form of his "Dialogues at the Waterfront" series. This was an event and workshop encompassing lectures, talks, panel discussions, poetry recitation, meditation and his "jugalbandi" now taking form as his self composed poetry recitation on environment consciousness to the beats of a contemporary or Indian classical dancer performing, at the forefront of his installations. His Waterfront included several stakeholders of society invited by Gupta. Inaugurated by the Union Minister for Water and Sanitation, Govt of India, the exhibition also witnessed and was critiqued by Richard R. Verma, Sakti Burman, Maite Delteil, Kiran Karnik, Meghnad Desai, Baron Desai, Kamal Meattle, Kiran Nadar, B. N. Goswamy, Yogendra Narain, along with several other Individuals.

In 2017, Gupta exhibited his beehive garden project along with 4 other installations— Noah's Ark, The Bed of Love, Time Machine and the river waterfront in his "Museum in a Mall" experience at DLF Mall of India, that later went on to be critiqued as a "solo biennale" by art critics and media houses. The exhibition's timeline was extended by public demand. Gupta invited several stakeholders of society for his dialogues at the waterfront series to discuss issues on climate change and sustainable development for a panel discussion at the backdrop of his waterfront. In the same year Gupta donated a painting that was auctioned for raising funds for Water Health Charity, USA.

In the latter half of 2017 Gupta was hosted by one his collectors in their home in Amrita Shergill Marg, New Delhi. Gupta created his first private prototype museum in their gardens and embracing trees and architecture. Gupta created Rain, that he had first conceptualised and created at his studio in 2012. Gupta strongly believed that activism need not be loud. And he therefore committed to his movement on climate change, sustainability and environment consciousness by inviting influential stakeholders of society to his studio and holding meaningful conversations to take his movement on environment consciousness and climate change forward. He invited Max Rodenbeck, Ashok Chauhan, Mahesh Sharma, Hari Bhartia and Kavita Bhartia, Uma Sharma, Anita Meattle, along with several ambassadors to India, namely Sir Dominic Asquith, British High Commissioner to India, Nadir Patel, Canadian High Commissioner to India, Mr Jose Ramón Barañano Fernández, Spanish High Commissioner to India, Ms Mariela Cruz Alvarez, Costa Rica High Commissioner to India and Dnyaneshwar Mulay, Former Consul General of India, New York.

In January 2018, Gupta unveiled Rain, that he first created in the latter half of 2017, at his studio in Amrita Shergill Marg. His traveling Museum was hosted by Indira Gandhi National Centre for the Arts and Ministry of Culture, Govt of India and was launched on World Environment Day and Inaugurated on 5 July by Dr Mahesh Sharma, Cabinet Minister, Ministry of Culture. The exhibition consisted of Rain, the Beehive Garden Project, Noah's Ark, three Time Machine's, the Bed of Life, and the River Waterfront. It was extended by public demand till 25 November 2018. Here, Gupta revisited the "Chipko movement" to embrace Neem and Arjuna trees, with half an acre of 'rain' and embraced space and architecture to deploy his river waterfront as an ode to Matighar, at IGNCA. He created 3 Time Machine's as in idiom to depict the sound of aum (OM) and created Noah's Ark on the fountain, in front of their Mansingh Lawns. Honeycombs or beehives of his 'Beehive Garden Project' were put up on the trees along with his rain. Gupta launched his campaign for the city with his environmental art installations as— "the city needs the river, we need our trees." With New Delhi's Air Quality Index being at its worse, in the history of the city, the artist's message highlighted and emphasised on the importance of trees being the lungs of the city and how 'rain' nurtures them, for which the 'river' needs to be clean. He continued his "Dialogues at the Waterfront" series which was a unique call to all stakeholders of society for a discourse to find transforming solutions for sustainable living. The exhibition was visited and critiqued by Vandana Shiva, Pheroza Godrej, Shyam Benegal, Lokesh Chandra, Amitabh Kant, Yogendra Narain, Anjolie Ela Menon, along with several others.

In 2019, Gupta was commissioned by the National Highway Authority of India (NHAI) to create an installation under the Rasulgarh Flyover in Bhubaneswar, Odisha, India. Gupta created half an acre of a "city in a city-sustainable city" dubbed "Water-the new gold, which had a 20 ft Tall Tube Well, installations and murals constructed with discarded concrete blocks and highway construction scrap materials. This project marked Gupta being credited with creating six iconic and revolutionary art projects in India for the decade of 2010–2019 by Indian Media Houses. Later that year, Gupta was awarded with the senior fellowship from the ministry of culture, govt of India as Outstanding Persons in the Field of Culture, for the field of Visual Arts.

== Select works and projects ==
=== Sculptures and installations ===
==== River ====
Gupta started exploring issues of environment consciousness using the earthen lamp (diya) as a sculptural motif (metaphor) in 2012–13. In an interview in Sculpture, the magazine of the International Sculpture Center, Gupta spoke about his first museum exhibition: 'I did a Duchamp on an earthen lamp—inverting it to transform it into a droplet of water—then laid it out as the shrinking river and the Zen - 'Earth' globe of clay on the floor of the National Museum in Pretoria in 2013.' His research explored how the earthen lamp is woven into the cultural-religious fabric of India since its inception as a nation and before (Indus Valley Civilisation). According to the artist, this small clay bowl has a nondescript existence, and only during its momentary use turns into a medium of spiritual significance. Sculpture magazine wrote that Gupta 'affirms the age-old sanctity of earth and clay, assembling everyday objects made by potters from across India to create large-scale installations that convey hope, passion, and the journey and transience of life'.

The work was first presented as The Shrinking River at the 2013 Pretoria exhibition, hosted by the Indian High Commission and Incredible India in the Ditsong National Museum of Natural History, South Africa. Gupta's tagline to the work — Maano toh mai Ganga Maa hoon, na maano toh behta paani ("if you consider me sacred I'm pure, else mere water that flows") — symbolised the journey of the earthen lamp from the roadside potter's heap to the domestic altar and back to the river. Reviewing the work for The Times of India, critic Uma Nair described the piece as drawing a 'cross-spectrum reference' between contemporary treatment of women and treatment of the planet Earth and the environment, with Ganges as the central idiom.

After creating The Shrinking River in 2013, Gupta created the River Waterfront at India Habitat Centre, New Delhi in 2015. A site-specific installation of 45 ft length × 60 ft width × 45 ft height at the plaza steps, thousands of earthen lamps were placed inverted, along several rows while chillums hung from the wall down the columns, to create an illusion of the flow of water. Reviewing the exhibition for Blouin Artinfo, Hemani Bhandari wrote that the installation created 'an optical illusion of an actual river flowing' and that its 'architectural engagement of the pottery with the walls transformed the regular venue into a riparian landscape'. "The architectural engagement of art with space and construction is something which is a matter of concern for me and is very important for art to belong there," Gupta stated. Not only do the lamps and chillums feed the need of metaphors but also provide the surface needed to portray a river without a shore, especially when placed inverted. "It's a poor potter's produce which is quintessentially Indian and in terms of micro-finance situation, I am trying to rehabilitate them as I buy diyas in huge numbers. It's deeply satisfying." Ripples and waves are discernible even in the installation as the pottery has been placed densely at certain places to give the right effect. This laying of the river is also the artist's bedrock of activity for dialogues across different stakeholders of society and cross-cultural worlds.

==== Rain ====
Gupta created his first iteration of Rain on the terrace of his studio in 2012. He formally presented a global premiere at his studio in Amrita Shergill Marg, New Delhi in the latter half of 2017. Gupta described the working method to Sculpture magazine: 'I use one element, clay, to depict another element, water... these installations are site-specific with a local context, embracing sylvan or architectural space with countless units of pottery woven patiently together as droplets of water in large-format perspectives.' The installation strings clay chillums on fine wires beneath tree branches to suggest falling rain, with diyas (traditional oil lamps) arranged on the wires adding geometric playfulness to the composition. The true experience of the work is best encountered by standing within it, which produces an effect akin to an object placed between parallel mirrors.

Gupta revised Rain to create "rain, rainforest and the beehive garden" — half an acre of rain at the Man Singh Lawns at the Indira Gandhi National Centre of Arts and Culture, hosted by the Ministry of Culture, Government of India, in 2018. In an interview with Sculpture magazine, Gupta said the work 'embraces trees—the lungs of the city', noting that the 2018 iteration used 'nearly half a million units of pottery and covered over one acre'. Photographs of the installation were documented by photographer Deidi von Schaewen.

==== The Beehive Garden Project ====
Beehives were first created by Gupta in 2013 in two iterations: a singular beehive made from chillums and deployed indoors, and an installation of multiple single-edition beehives alongside a larger version made from kulhads (earthen cups), exhibited in 2017. Gupta later deployed these beehives outdoors, embracing trees across half an acre, as part of his Rain, Rainforest and the Beehive Garden at IGNCA in 2018. Sculpture magazine published an installation view of The Beehive Garden at the sculpture garden at Amrita Shergill Marg, New Delhi, captioned as part of Gupta's Travelling Museum, 2018.

Gupta has described his Excavations in Hymns of Clay series — of which the beehives form one strand — as 'the natural offshoot of a 23-year journey beginning after my first solo show in 1996'. The Patriot has described his practice as one that 'creates immersive narratives around climate change, sustainable development, and the human connection with nature' through 'humble, everyday objects—such as earthen lamps (diyas), conical smoking pipes (chillums), and clay cups (kullads)', with bees — 'often overlooked but significant in the chain of evolution' — serving as the central symbol of this work. The art project suggests that these beehives, made with unconventional materials, can find a place in every garden and home, acting as a constant reminder to contribute to the preservation of bees and biodiversity.

==== Time Machine ====
Time Machine (2014) is an hourglass - shaped sculpture built from stacked earthen cups, first installed at Aerocity, New Delhi. Three further iterations were shown at the IGNCA exhibition in 2018, including Time Machine — the Sound of Aum. Gupta told Sculpture magazine that the work uses 'disposable clay cups to reinforce the message that we are all fragile and transient', adding: 'we do not live even a micro or nano existence along the timeline of the universe, and yet we use the earth's resources irresponsibly'. He described the 2018 triptych as an attempt to 'translate the sound of "aum," considered the sound of creation, with three syllables of "a," "u," and "m" — the middle one being the largest'. According to Gupta, clay, symbolizing the raw essence of existence and sustainability, is used metaphorically to represent the limited nature of Time, inviting us to reflect on our role in the utilization of earth's resources. Gupta introduces light within the installation to symbolise the awakening of human consciousness and its potential for hope. The Times of India described the work as maintaining 'an understated elegance' and as 'gracefully inviting public engagement with art, showcasing the artist's innovative use of pottery as a mass-consumed artistic medium'.

==== Noah's Ark ====
Gupta incorporates the symbolism of Noah's Ark to emphasize the importance of environmental preservation. Acting as a metaphor for earth and humanity in its cycle of creation, destruction, and rebirth, he explores the pivotal role played by the ark. In his interpretation, Noah's Ark represents an ancient civilization in which Noah and his vessel achieved historical significance by saving life on Earth from impending catastrophe. Gupta's artistic vision delves into the concept of an imagined buried museum, where the Noah's Ark and other creations, such as the Time Machine, are discovered. These artifacts symbolize the secrets of sustainable living and serve as a reminder of the collective responsibility mankind has in safeguarding nature from its own interference. The artwork encourages its viewers to reflect on their role as individuals in protecting not only themselves but also future generations and other species. It emphasizes the notion that humans are interconnected and malleable like clay, capable of assuming the role of Noah by pausing and adopting sustainable practices.

==== Bed of Life ====
Gupta produced two versions of the work — Meet Me by the Riverside, the Bed of Love (2017) and the Bed of Life (2018) — both an iteration of his 2012 prototype from his studio. The installation created with ceramics: earthen lamps and earthen cups, depict a man-made bed as a metaphor for riverbed. The riverbed evokes a symbolic representation of history, love, and hope, with the tagline Meet me by the riverside suggesting a connection to nature and a deeper understanding of the environment.

=== Paintings ===
Gupta's paintings are known for their contemplative and spiritual nature that explore the connection between the inner sanctums of the soul and the natural world. His work encompasses a wide range of mediums, including watercolours, acrylics, oils, sculptures, and multimedia. "Environment consciousness", "light" and "hope" are the central themes of his works. Some of his notable series on paintings are titled Intimate Whispers, Rainforests, Non-Limiting Horizons, Lyrics of Light, Shoonya – from Beyond and Umbilical Cords of Earth, Air, Water, Fire & Space.

Art critic Keshav Malik has written of Gupta's Rainforests and Umbilical Cords series that the works reflect 'a contemplation of the spiritual and the natural communion' in which 'images act as a vehicle of a visionary world that is itself the instrument of self-transcendence', and that the artist has 'come to understand light as that from which the objects we see are made', with the umbilical cord–rainforest imagery representing 'an epiphany of the universe continually opening up from sacred source, the centre of the birth of life'.

In an interview in Classic Feel, Gupta stated: 'For me it has always been a quest for light. I seek light — in gaps, in crevices and ventricles of the rainforests. For me light is hope.' His paintings have been described as capturing fleeting moments and emotions, serving as a diary of his innermost thoughts though not autobiographical in nature. His brushwork exhibits a sense of ease and relaxation, and his use of colours — blues, umbers, greens, oranges, reds, and indigos — creates a captivating interplay of shades and forms.

One notable aspect of Gupta's works is the use of titles in the form of haiku-style poems, which not only explain his thoughts but also contribute to the overall aesthetic of the paintings. Gupta's love for nature is deeply rooted, stemming from his childhood experiences and close connection to earth and nature. The Earth series draws attention to the beauty of nature and reflects his love for music and poetry; each artwork in the series is accompanied by a poem. Gupta's style combines his skills as a poet and an artist, and it is sometimes unclear whether the poetry or the painting comes first in his creative process.

Gupta has also used his paintings along with his poetry to create one-minute and thirty-second films as public service messages commissioned by the Ministry of Environment and Forests, Government of India, for television on climate change, sustainable development, ecosystems and alternate energy. Gupta has also used his paintings for creating dual and triple channel video installations in South Africa in 2013 and prototype 'digital viewing rooms' from the period of 2009–2012.

His works are held in the permanent collections of the Rashtrapati Bhawan, the Parliament of India, the Ministry of Culture (India), the BIFA Museum in Bhutan, and Worldmark at the T3 International Airport, Aerocity, New Delhi, as well as in private and royal collections including those of the Royal Family of Oman and Royal Family of Bhutan

=== Murals ===
==== Tree of Life ====
He has won international acclaim for his first of its kind six floor high 5000 sq ft in facade and 10000 sq ft of total painted surface, commissioned mega mural at the headquarters of a leading telecom corporate giant in Gurgaon near Delhi, India in 2010, where he painted Live for three months while involving thousands of employees' brush strokes in his creation "The Tree of Life". The Tree of Life is the tallest and largest three-dimensional indoor staircase mural by artist Manav Gupta. It covers approximately 5,000 sq ft of visible frontage through a glass façade and 10,000 sq ft of total painted surface. Its significance lies in the methodology of creation as a work of contemporary art, with the first of its kind simultaneous use of four different art practices in conceptual, site specific, collaborative and performance art.

When commissioned by Bharti Airtel Ltd to create a "staircase artwork" at their headquarters, the artist introduced a unique sustainable development process in corporate entity, by establishing that art can contribute to the business environment as well, by refreshing the intangible quality of its soft power among employees. Adding a collaborative dimension, he conceptualised the mural as a public art project by allowing thousands of employees the experience of putting brush strokes. In the process, a series of role plays of teaching and motivating employees took effect as performance art. In the second half of the project, a three dimensional site specific composition took shape. With Gupta working solo all through the day, live in front of 3500 employees and almost as many visitors at the corporate campus site, the mural took three months to complete as an evolving storyline of five elements in Nature. Keeping in mind the visibility of the staircase all over the campus through a 60 ft high glass facade, the site specific intervention amalgamated the background wall and the front face of the staircase perspectives of five floors into a single canvas merging surrounding sides and roof within one composition.
