= Viji Prakash =

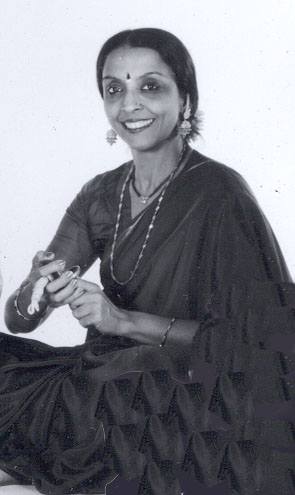
- Born: Vijaya Lakshmi; India
- Occupation: Bharata Natyam dancer
- Spouse: Prakash (death)
- Children: Mythili Prakash
- Awards: Devdasi National Award (2014), Kerala Sangeeta Nataka Academy Award (2013)
- Website: Shakti Bharatnatyam official website

Vijaya Lakshmi Prakash, popularly known as Viji Prakash, is an Indian Bharata Natyam dancer, instructor, choreographer, and founder of the Shakti Dance Company and Shakti School of Bharata Natyam. She has worked in the USA since 1976.

== Personal life ==
Viji was married to Prakash, and their daughter Mythili Prakash is also a dancer and choreographer specializing in Bharatanatyam.
