= Tree of death =

Tree of death may refer to:

- Manchineel tree, also known as the "tree of death" because of its poisonous sap, a species of flowering plant in the spurge family
- Qlippoth, the representation of evil or impure spiritual forces in Kabbalah
- Zaqqum, a cursed tree that is rooted in the center of Jahannam
- The Tree of Death: Yomotsuhegui, a Japanese manga series

== See also ==
- Tree of life (disambiguation)
