= Etz Chaim =

Tree of Life in Hebrew

And out of the ground made the LORD God to grow every tree that is pleasant to the sight, and good for food; the tree of life also in the midst of the garden, and the tree of the knowledge of good and evil.

— Bereshit, Genesis 2:9 1917 Jewish Publication Society translation

Etz Hayim, also transliterated as Eitz Chaim (עץ חיים ‘Ēṣ Ḥayyīm, meaning "Tree of Life"), is a common term used in Judaism. The expression can be found in Genesis 2:9, referring to the Tree of Life in the Garden of Eden. It is also found in the Book of Proverbs, where it is figuratively applied to "wisdom" Proverbs 3:18, "the fruit of a righteous man" Proverbs 11:30, "a desire fulfilled" Proverbs 13:12, and "healing tongue" Proverbs 15:4.

== Usage in Hebrew ==
My son, forget not My instruction, and may your heart keep My commandments; [...] It is a tree of life for those who grasp it, and those who draw near it are fortunate.

— Mishlei, Proverbs 3:1,18

- Etz Chaim is a common name for yeshivas and synagogues as well as for works of rabbinic literature.
- The term Etz Chaim (plural: עצי חיים Atzei Chaim) is also used to describe each of the wooden poles to which the parchment of a Sefer Torah is attached. A hymn including the aforementioned verse Proverbs 3:18 (Etz ḥayim hi lamaḥaziqim bah, v'tomkheiha m'ushar) is sung in all Ashkenazi rites as the Torah is returned to the ark.
- In Kabbalah, the Etz Ḥayim symbol (Etz Ha-Hayim, The Tree of Life") is a mystical symbol used to understand the nature of God and the manner in which he created the world. The term Etz Ḥayim is also the title of one of the most important works in Jewish mysticism, written by Ḥayim Vital in the course of twenty years following the death of his master, Isaac Luria, in 1572, presenting and explicating Luria's systematic reconceptualization and expansion of the insights of the Zohar and other earlier mystical sources. Vital's Etz Chaim is the foundational work for the later Lurianic Kabbalah, which soon became the mainstream form of Kabbalah amongst both Sephardi and Ashkenazi Jewry up to the modern period. This massive multi-volumed work circulated only in manuscript form among mystics for over 100 years, and was first published in 1782.
- A widely used modern melody for the hymn was composed by Tanchum Gershon Portnoy in the early 1970s and released on his 1975 album Tanchumim. It spread through congregational use as the Torah scroll is returned to the ark and was sometimes subsequently labeled “traditional” after its authorship became less widely known.

== Educational institutions ==
- Etz Chaim Yeshiva, Jerusalem
- Congregation Etz Chaim (Lombard, Illinois)
- Congregation Etz Chayim (Palo Alto, California)
- Congregation Etz Chayim (Toledo, Ohio)
- Congregation Etz Chaim of Ramona (Ramona, California)
- Eitz Chaim Schools (Toronto, Ontario)

== English publications ==
- First volume of Hayim Vital's Kabbalistic text Etz Hayim has been translated in The Tree of Life: Chayyim Vital's Introduction to the Kabbalah of Isaac Luria – The Palace of Adam Kadmon, Donald Wilder Menzi and Zwe Padeh, Jason Aronson 1999. Introduction gives overview of Lurianic system
- Etz Hayim Humash: a Hebrew-English Torah commentary with haftarot, created by the Conservative movement of Judaism, with commentary by Chaim Potok.

== See also ==
- Tree of life (disambiguation)
- Pittsburgh synagogue shooting
