= Sanatan Sangeet Sanskriti =

- Awarded for: Outstanding achievements in classical music
- Country: India
- Presented by: Ram Krishan & Sons Charitable Trust
- First award: 1993
- Website: http://www.rkkr.org/sanatan_sangeet_sanskriti.htm

Sanatan Sangeet Sanskriti was established in 1993 by Ram Krishan & Sons Charitable Trust to recognize services rendered in music and dance.

In 1993, the Sanatan Sangeet Sanskriti started presenting two National Awards every year to honour contributions in the field of music and dance. These awards are called "Sanatan Sangeet Samman" and "Sanatan Sangeet Puraskar".

== Objective ==
"Sanatan" in Sanskrit means "eternal" or "timeless". The coming into existence of Sanatan Sangeet Sanskriti is the result of the efforts of a group of lovers of music and dance to find a promoting-forum-cum-research-institute for music, dance and other Indian arts.

In India, it is believed that the divine principle which was all pervading, before becoming and evolving into the material worlds viz., the Earth, the Planets, the Sun & the Stars which are numberless, was in the form of sound – Nadha Brahman – which is symbolized by the mystic word "OM".

Music, dance and art have unifying effect. They transcend religion, language and other seemingly dividing factors. These three are also one. While dance is music in action, art is a kind of frozen music. It is necessary to promote and encourage music, dance and other arts for the sake of harmony, unity and world peace. Music, dance and art will enable man to understand himself better and to realize his true nature.

The Sanatan Sangeet Sanskriti has been established with the above objectives in view and proposes to engage in the following activities:

- To shape the talents and to enable others to learn and appreciate the art.
- To provide teaching facilities for teaching music – classical and light, antique and modern, carnatic and Hindustani and dance – particularly Bharatanatyam, Odissi, Kathak, Kathakali and Mohiniyattam.
- Providing facilities for research in music, dance and other Indian arts.
- Conducting competitions for young artists in music, dance and to award prizes to encourage them to develop further.
- Awards to outstanding artists to honour them.
- Holding seminars, conferences, meetings and exhibitions.
- Publishing of books, souvenirs, periodicals etc. in connection with and in furtherance of the objectives of the Sanskriti.

== Sanatan Sangeet Sanskriti Awards ==
Sanatan Sangeet Samman is to honour a senior artist for his / her excellence and outstanding contributions to the Indian Classical Music / Dance. The Sanatan Sangeet Puraskar is to honour a talented artist in recognition of his / her talent and potential for excellence.

=== Awardees ===
==== Sanatan Sangeet Samman ====
Dr L Subramaniam, Pandit Bhimsen Joshi, Lalgudi Jayaraman, Sonal Mansingh, Kishori Amonkar,

==== Sanatan Sangeet Puraskar ====
Arushi Bhargava Narain, Lalgudi Vijayalakshmi, Kavita Dwibedi, A R Rahman, Arushi Mudgal Mandolin Srinivas

==== Sanatan Kalakriti Puraskar ====
The Sanskriti also instituted the Sanatan Kalakriti Puraskar to a selected artist in recognition of his / her contribution in the field of painting / sculpture.

The first recipient of this award was Shri Manav Gupta in 2006.

==== Sanatan Nritya Puraskar ====
Sanatan Nritya Puraskar given to a distinguished young artist in recognition of his / her talents, achievements & potential

Navia Natarajan (2010).

The Sanskriti has constituted National Awards to be presented annually to artists in different categories. The awards for 2007 were as follows:

Sanatan Sangeet Samman to honour a senior artist for his / her personal excellence and outstanding contributions to the Indian classical music / dance, awarded to Ustad Amjad Ali Khan.

Sanatan Kalakriti Puraskar given to a distinguished artist in the area of Painting and sculpture category in recognition of his / her achievements and potential, to Shri Subrata Kundu.

Sanatan Nritya Puraskar given to a distinguished young artist in recognition of his / her talents, achievements & potential, awarded to Kumari Mythili Prakash.
