= Arbor vitae =

Arbor vitae /ˌɑːrbɔːr ˈvaɪtiː/ may refer to:

== Anatomy ==
- Arbor vitae (anatomy), the white cerebellar matter
- Arbor vitae uteri, a part of the cervical canal

== Places ==
- Arbor Vitae, Wisconsin, a town in the United States
- Arbor Vitae (community), Wisconsin, an unincorporated community in the United States

== Other uses ==
- Arborvitae, a genus of coniferous trees or shrubs in the cypress family
- Arbor Vitae, a 1995 album by J Church

== See also ==
- Tree of life (disambiguation)
