= Tree of Life mural (Manav Gupta) =

Mural by Manav Gupta in Gurgaon, India

Tree of Life
- Artist: Manav Gupta
- Year: 2010
- Type: Mural
- Location: Bharti Airtel center; Gurgaon
- Owner: Bharti Airtel

The Tree of Life is a large three-dimensional mural by artist Manav Gupta, located across the interior staircase of the Bharti Airtel office building in Gurgaon, India. Covering approximately 5,000 sq ft of facade space and 10,000 sq ft of total painted surface, it is the tallest and largest indoor staircase mural. While deploying site specific collaborative art practice of allowing more than 1000 employees of the office building, to participate in the experience of painting in the initial phase, the artist conceptualised the creation as a public art project.

== Innovation of methodology ==
The methodology of creation was the first-of-its-kind simultaneous use of four different art practices engaging in conceptual, site specific, collaborative, and performance art. Gupta allowed the 3500 employees at the site, the experience of putting their brush strokes, while on their job, in the initial half of the project. As a part of his performance art, he executed a series of roles while teaching and motivating employees. At the same time, the artist engaged the employees in his practice of team-building exercise through art while creating a five floor high artwork.

In the second half of the project, the colours and strokes were taken as raw stock for creating the composition. He proceeded with the three-month performance art alone; live in front of 3500 employees and almost as many visitors at the site (the campus) to evolve a storyline. Keeping in mind the visibility of the staircase all over the campus through a 60 ft high glass facade, the site specific intervention amalgamated the background wall and the front face of the staircase perspectives of five floors into a single canvas merging surrounding sides and roof within one composition.

== The evolving storyline ==
A philosophical perspective was highlighted in the artist's statement while addressing the translation of his sustainable development ideology in his site specific intervention.

As an artist my endeavor was to bring in the spirituality of higher consciousness within a business environment. Hence the burgeoning Tree of Life spreads growth and vibrancy in the ever evolving five elements of nature. Each element depicted on respective floor beginning from earth to water to air, space and fire mingle with one another to create symbolism of an ever growing state of energy in the universe.

The compositions on each floor symbolize the evolving human needs that bind and grow into the next higher stage of consciousness. Beginning with sustenance and fun depicted on the second floor, to love and bonding, celebration and procreation on the third floor represented by the Adam and Eve formed out of the intertwined branches, the peacock and the non limiting horizon of the sea behind. It then grows to higher needs as the floors progress upwards into the signature umbilical cords of human existence on the fourth floor from where it rises to the “gaze” a reflection of one‘s introspection on the fifth level - the window to the soul and only then the larger cosmic “glow” emanating from the sixth floor sinks in to drive home the awareness that one begins to have with the experience of life itself. I see the organization as a symbolism of the above. Hence the creation shaped from an ever evolving stage where I let the employees experience color and form and learn the joy of creation while I absorbed what the organization stood for through its employees by letting them paint and pour on my canvas.

I then transformed all multifarious hues, shapes, colors and idioms into a composite mega canvas that spoke one language as a work of art for me to create the above story-line.
