= Tree of life (biblical) =

Tree in the Garden of Eden

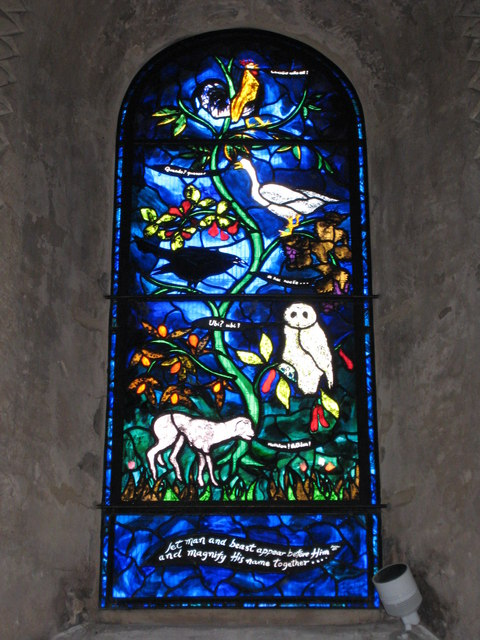
Stained glass window in St Mary the Virgin parish church, Iffley, Oxfordshire, made in 1995

In Judaism and Christianity, the tree of life (Hebrew: עֵץ הַחַיִּים, romanized: ‘ēṣ haḥayyīm; Latin: Lignum vitae) is first described in chapter 2, verse 9 of the Book of Genesis as being "in the midst of the Garden of Eden" with the tree of the knowledge of good and evil (עֵץ הַדַּעַת טוֹב וָרָע; Lignum scientiae boni et mali). After the fall of man, "lest he put forth his hand, and take also of the tree of life, and eat, and live for ever", cherubim and a flaming sword are placed at the east end of the Garden to guard the way to the tree of life. The tree of life has become the subject of some debate as to whether or not it and the tree of the knowledge of good and evil is the same tree.

In the Bible outside of Genesis, the term "tree of life" appears in Proverbs (3:18; 11:30; 13:12; 15:4) and Revelation (2:7; 22:2,14,19). It also appears in 2 Esdras (2:12; 8:52) and 4 Maccabees (18:16), which are included among the Jewish apocrypha.

According to the Greek Apocalypse of Moses, the tree of life is also called the Tree of Mercy. Adam believed the oil of the tree of life would relieve him of his ailments and sent Seth and Eve to the doors of the Garden to beg for some oil of the tree of life.

== Number of trees ==
Karl Budde, in his critical study of 1883, proposed that there was only one tree in the body of the Genesis narrative, and that it had been portrayed in two ways: one as the tree in the middle of the Garden, and two as the forbidden tree. Claus Westermann gave recognition to Budde's theory in 1976.

Howard N. Wallace also believes that the Eden account originally only contained a single tree, with the other added later possibly from two different sources.

Ellen van Wolde noted that among Bible scholars "the trees are almost always dealt with separately and not related to each other" and that "attention is almost exclusively directed to the tree of knowledge of good and evil, whereas the tree of life is paid hardly any attention."

== Religious views ==
=== Christianity ===
==== Catholic Church ====
In the Catholic Church the Tree of Life in Book of Revelation verse 2:7 is the Eucharist.

==== Eastern Christianity ====
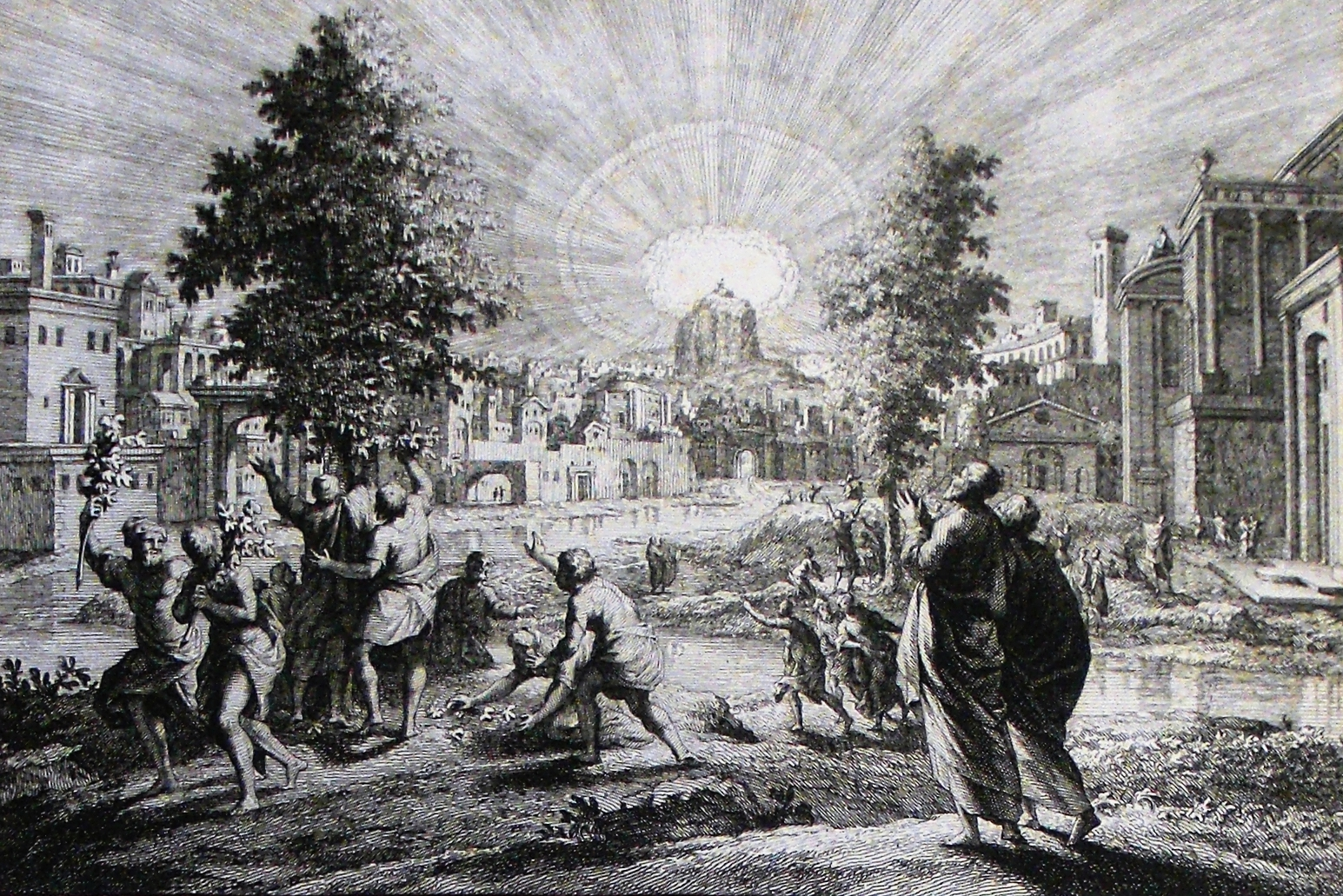
The tree of life, a print from the Phillip Medhurst Collection of Bible illustrations in the possession of the Rev. Philip De Vere at St. George's Court, Kidderminster, England

The Eastern Orthodox Church has traditionally understood the tree of life in Genesis as a prefiguration of the Cross, which humanity could not partake of until after the incarnation, death and resurrection of Jesus.

==== Western Christianity ====
In The City of God (xiii.20–21), Augustine of Hippo offers great allowance for "spiritual" interpretations of the events in the garden, so long as such allegories do not rob the narrative of its historical reality. Enlightenment theologians (culminating perhaps in Brunner and Niebuhr in the twentieth century) sought for figurative interpretations because they had already dismissed the historical possibility of the story.

Others sought very pragmatic understandings of the tree. In the Summa Theologica (Q97), Thomas Aquinas argued that the tree served to maintain Adam's biological processes for an extended earthly animal life. It did not provide immortality as such, for the tree, being finite, could not grant infinite life. Hence after a period of time, the man and woman would need to eat again from the tree or else be "transported to the spiritual life." The common fruit trees of the garden were given to offset the effects of "loss of moisture" (note the doctrine of the humors at work), while the tree of life was intended to offset the inefficiencies of the body. Following Augustine in the City of God (xiv.26), "man was furnished with food against hunger, with drink against thirst, and with the tree of life against the ravages of old age."

John Calvin (Commentary on Genesis 2:8), following a different thread in Augustine (City of God, xiii.20), understood the tree in sacramental language. Given that humanity cannot exist except within a covenantal relationship with God, and all covenants use symbols to give us "the attestation of his grace", he gives the tree, "not because it could confer on man that life with which he had been previously endued, but in order that it might be a symbol and memorial of the life which he had received from God." God often uses symbols; he doesn't transfer his power into these outward signs, but "by them He stretches out His hand to us, because, without assistance, we cannot ascend to Him." Thus he intends man, as often as he eats the fruit, to remember the source of his life, and acknowledge that he lives not by his own power, but by God's kindness. Calvin denies (contra Aquinas and without mentioning his name) that the tree served as a biological defense against physical aging. This is the standing interpretation in modern Reformed theology as well.

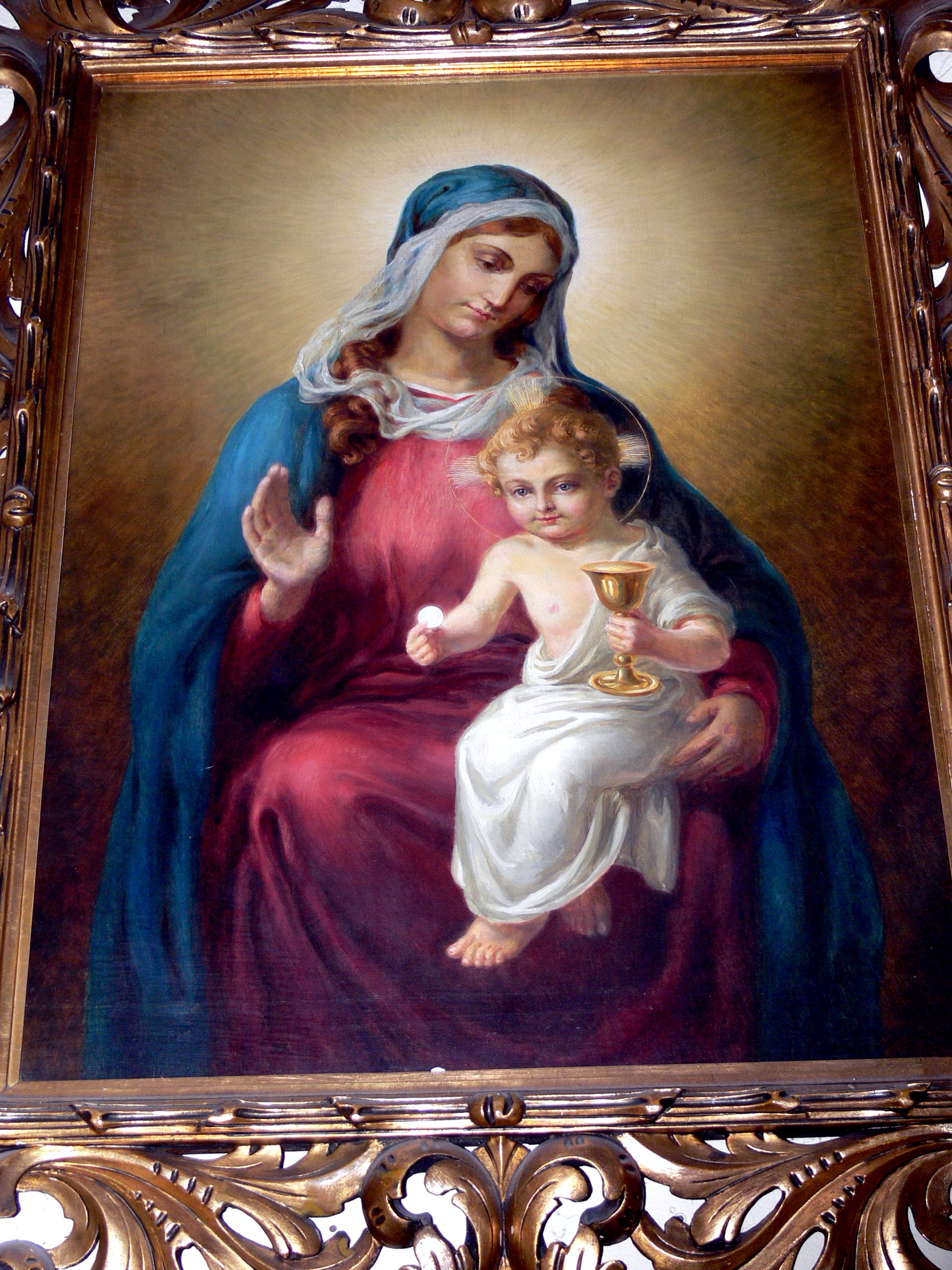
Mary Assumption parish church in Pühret (Neustift i.M., Upper Austria): Altar of Virgin Mary: Image of Madonna with Child (1900).

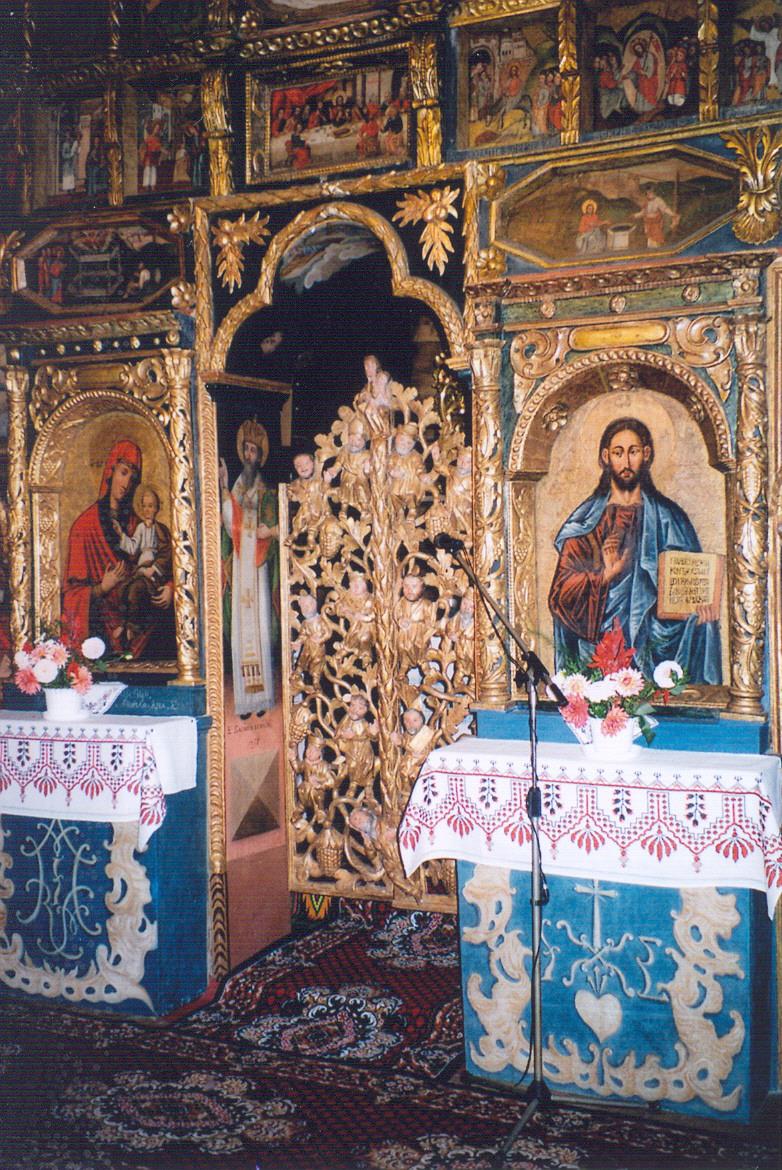
Gilded royal doors carved to represent the tree of life (old wooden church in Chotyniec, Poland)

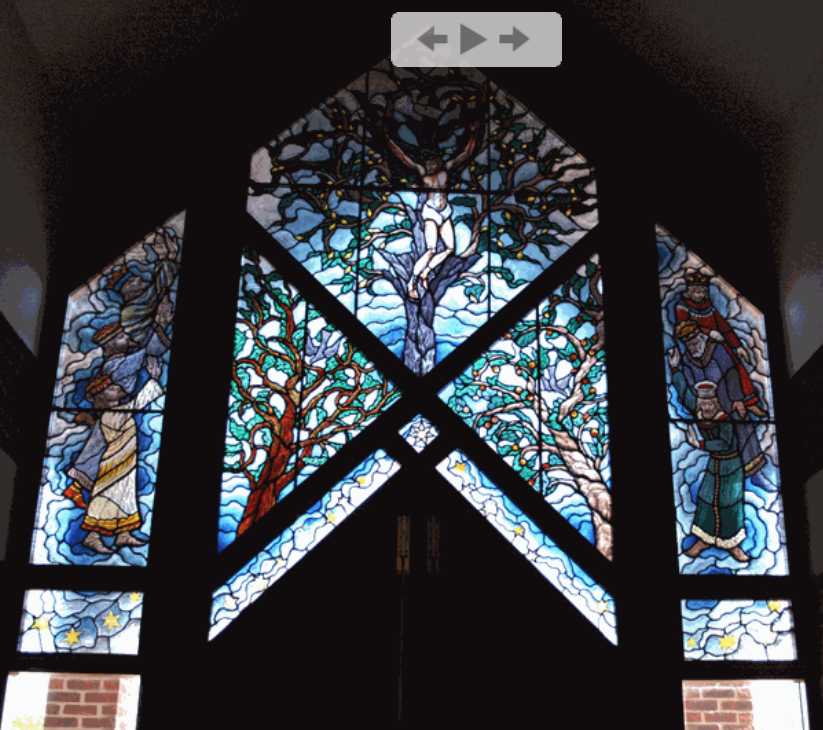
Tree of Life at St. Teresa's Catholic Church, Beaconsfield, UK

=== Judaism ===
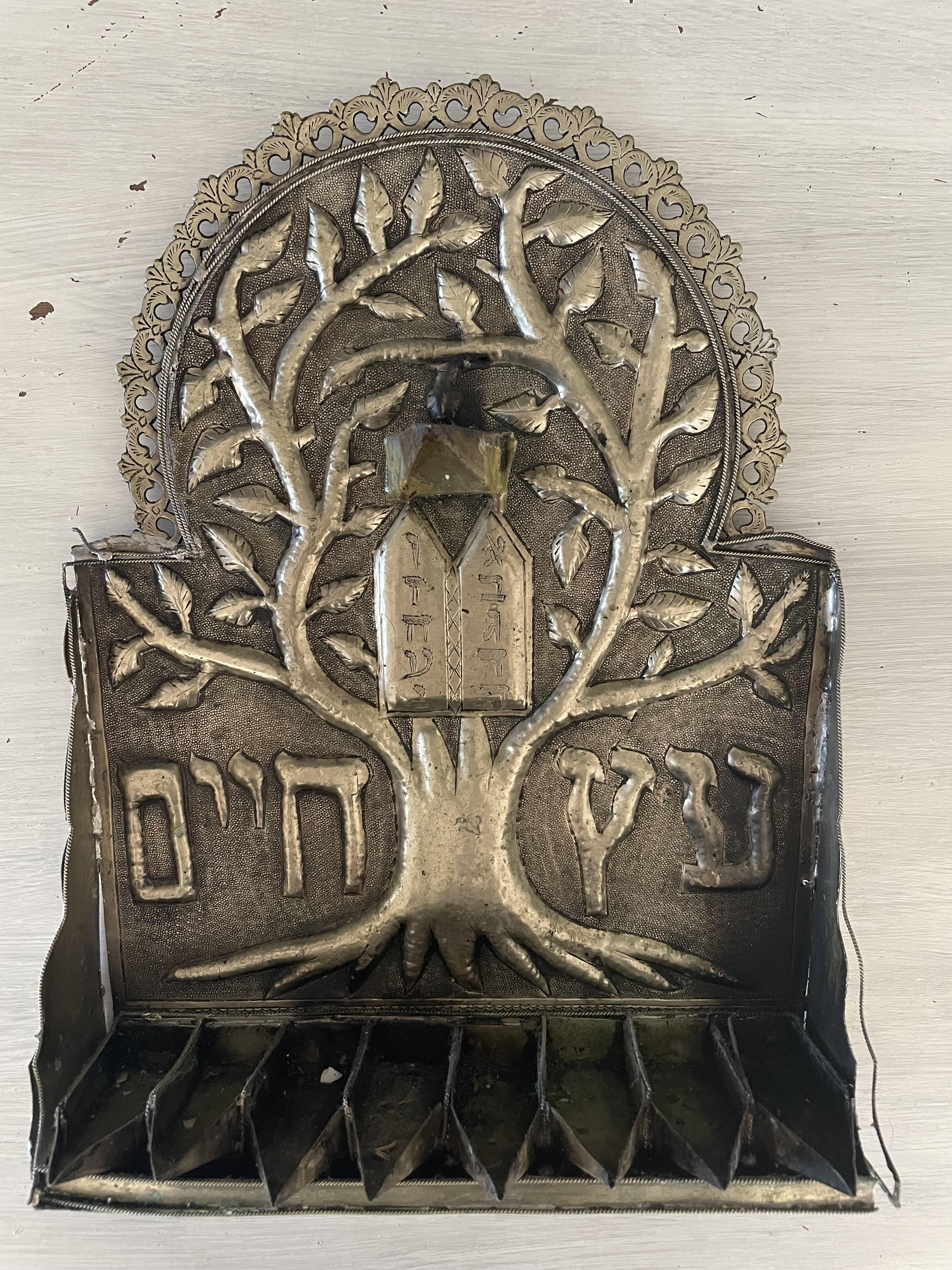
Moroccan hanukkiah with Tree of Life (Etz Chaim) motif

According to Jewish mythology, in the Garden of Eden there is a tree of life or the "tree of souls" that blossoms and produces new souls, which fall into the Guf, the Treasury of Souls. The Angel Gabriel reaches into the treasury and takes out the first soul that comes into his hand. Lailah, the Angel of Conception, watches over the embryo until it is born.

==== Jewish mythology ====
The tree of life appears in Judahite pillar figurines of Asherah iconography, particularly on the Lachish ewer and Pithos A from Kuntillet Ajrud, where it is flanked by ibexes. The tree's design, with buds, flowers, and possibly almond drupes, resembles the menorah, which is thought to represent a stylized almond tree in Exodus 25:31-36 This suggests a continuation of Asherah's cultic representation in the temple. Scholars have explored these connections, noting parallels between sacred trees, Asherah, and the menorah.

==== Kabbalah ====
The tree of life is represented in several examples of sacred geometry and is central in particular to the Kabbalah, where it is represented as a diagram of ten nodes called sefirot (singular sefirah), or the ten emanations or attributes of God. It portrays how God, the Creator, demonstrates his creative energy throughout the universe, via angels and then to humans. Each of the tree's branches (sefirot) represents a different category of creative force that is overseen by a different Archangel. Believers claim that by focusing on the various energies one by one, people can develop a closer spiritual union with God. Kabbalah is an esoteric method, discipline and school of thought in Jewish mysticism.

== In popular culture ==
The tree of life is mentioned explicitly in the 2006 film The Fountain; it is discussed in connection with the Hebrew Genesis book.

In the 1995 anime Neon Genesis Evangelion, the Angels possess the "fruit of life", which provides them with infinite energy, enabling regeneration and shapeshifting, among other abilities.

== See also ==
- Adam and Eve
- al-Qurnah
- The Fountain
- Lote tree
- Sephirot
- Sidrat al-Muntaha
- Tree of Jesse
- Tree of life
- Tree of life vision
- Trees in mythology
- Yggdrasil
