= Elijah Spira =

Son of Benjamin Wolf Spira, brother-in-law of Rabbi Yaakov Reischer

- אליהו שפירא
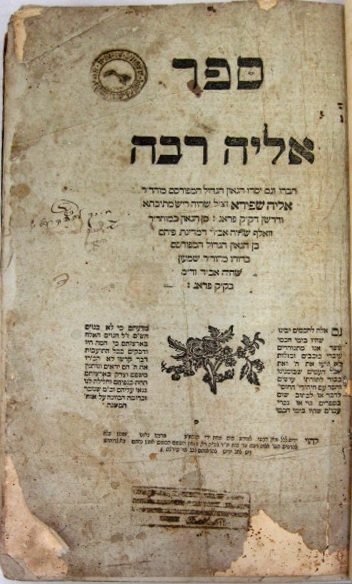
- Eliyahu Rabbah, by Elijah Spira.
- Born: 1660; Prague, Kingdom of Bohemia
- Died: April 14, 1712 (aged 51–52); Prague, Kingdom of Bohemia
- Resting place: Old Jewish Cemetery, Prague
- Known for: Rabbi; darshan; posek
- Notable work: Eliyahu Zutta; Eliyahu Rabbah

Elijah Spira (alternatively, Shapira or Shapiro, Hebrew: אליהו שפירא; 1660–1712) was a Jewish legal and religious scholar, rabbi and author, born in Prague. He was rabbi at Tiktin (then in the Polish–Lithuanian Commonwealth), and afterward maggid (preacher) and director of a large yeshiva (Talmudic academy) in his hometown of Prague. He died at Prague on April 14, 1712.

Spira came from a family of rabbis and scholars. He was the son of Benjamin Wolf Spira (1640‍–‍1715), later the chief rabbi of Bohemia, whom he pre-deceased. He was a brother-in-law of the prominent rabbis Yaakov Reischer, and David Oppenheim, and a student of Rabbi Avraham Gombiner.

His works include Eliyahu Zutta, a commentary on that part of Mordecai Yoffe's Levush relating to the Shulchan Arukh, Orach Chaim (Prague, 1689, 1701). His best-known work was Eliyahu Rabbah (Sulzbach, 1757), containing discussions on Orach Chaim. It was posthumously published by his son, whose name is not given. Originally intended as a commentary on the Levush (like Eliyahu Zutta), it was printed as commentary on the Shulchan Aruch and became known as such. Shishah Shittot, containing novellæ on six Talmudic tractates, was published by his grandson Elijah ben Wolf Spira (Fürth, 1768).

His manuscript works, including commentaries on the Bible and Talmud, as well as sermons, responsa, etc., were destroyed by fire in 1754.
