= Baruch Gazahay =

Rabbi Baruch Gazahay ברוך גזהיי
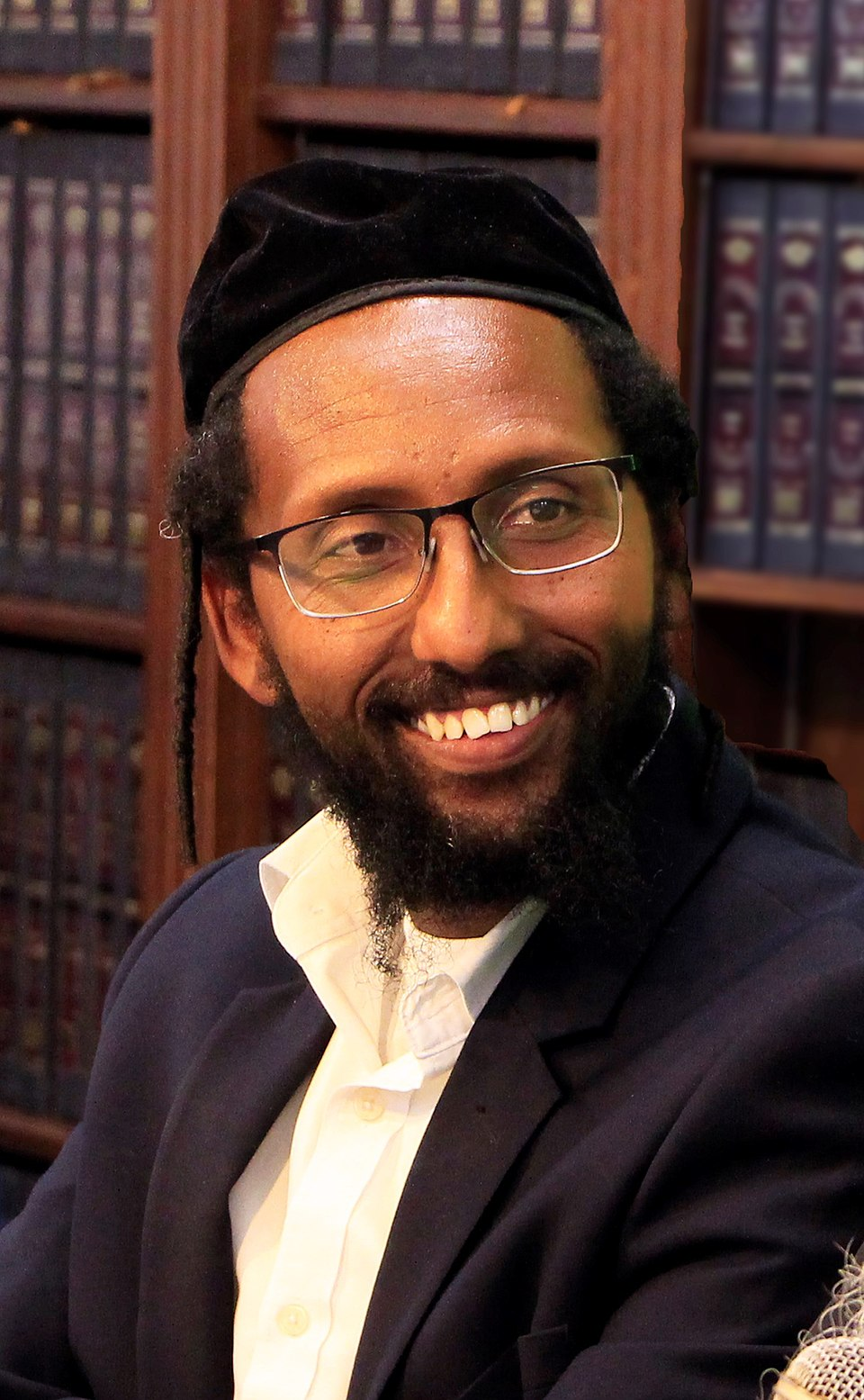
- Gazahay in 2019

Personal life
- Born: 1981 (age 44–45) Ethiopia

Religious life
- Religion: Judaism

Jewish leader
- Position: Rosh Yeshiva
- Yeshiva: Od Yosef Chai
- Residence: Beersheva

Baruch Gazahay (Hebrew: ברוך גזהיי) is a Haredi Israeli Rabbi and a founder of the Od Yosef Chai institution. He is best known for his involvement in Orthodox Judaism outreach (kiruv) and founded Od Yosef Chai institution which engages in Torah dissemination and religious outreach.

== Personal life ==
Gazahay was born in Ethiopia and immigrated to Israel at the age of 2 with his family. They lived at the Shaul HaMelech in Beersheba. He studied at the Rabbi Yosef Karo elementary school in Beersheba. In 1999, he was drafted into the Israel Defense Forces and served as a combat soldier and Squad commander in the Duvdevan Unit, including participation in Operation Defensive Shield.

After completing his military service, he worked as a security guard for the Ministry of Defense. In 2003, alongside his employment, he began studying Law at Ono Academic College and lived in Ganei Tikva. During his studies, Gazhai was exposed to a book, Ein Yaakov and to an audio lecture dealing with faith and trust in God by a rabbi active in religious outreach. Following this exposure, he and his family became religious. In 2004, he began studying at the yeshiva of Rabbi Yaron Hajjabi in Beersheba and began delivering Torah lectures himself.

== Career ==
Gazahay was giving classes on morals and halacha in a Synagogue near his home. Where he gained a following. In 2008, he opened the Od Yosef Chai institution which includes a synagogue and a Beit midrash which supports more than 300 families. Gazahay, emphasized on the importance of good manners and halacha. Since 2016, he has been giving lectures across Israel and attracting more people from traditional backgrounds into repentance (Baal teshuva). Gazahay has accumulated thousands of hours in which he has given lessons all over the country. His lectures have gained more than 2,500,000 views on YouTube.

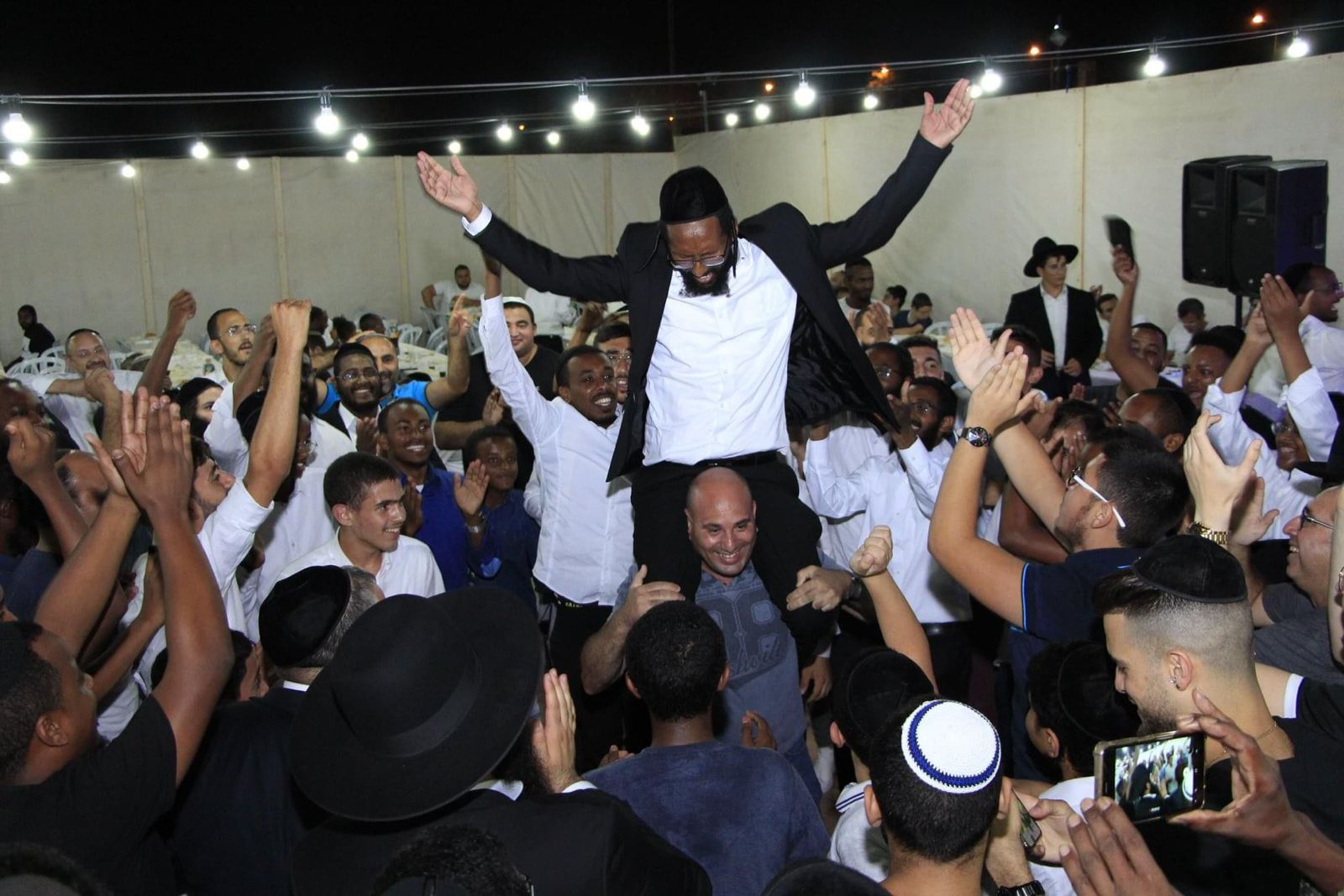
Gahazay and his followers celebrating the writing of a new Torah scroll

He follows the teachings of Rabbi Ovadia Yosef and the Ben Ish Chai, and the Yeshiva studies their books regularly. The yeshiva is named in their honor.

In 2018, he supported the Shas party in the municipal elections. In 2019, ahead of the 2019 Israeli legislative election, he was appointed head of Shas's youth campaign headquarters. Prior to the 2019 Israeli legislative election, he was placed 11th on the Shas party list in which he gained a seat in the Knesset.

After entering Israeli politics, Gazahay faced criticism from many commentators, particularly from left-leaning media outlets and politicians, who cited controversial remarks from his early lectures. According to In a 2016 lecture on modesty titled “Modesty is King”, he reportedly stated that, according to Kabbalistic texts, a woman who regularly exposes her upper body would “usually be reincarnated as a cow, whose upper parts are exposed.”

In another clip, Gazahay advised that a man should not engage in conversation with a woman he does not know. Using the example of a supermarket cashier, he said: “You bought something? Shut up and say ‘Miss, this is what I bought.’” He further suggested that if a woman attempts to speak to the man, he should inform her he will call the police. He concluded that “a woman must be covered."

When these past statements resurfaced, Aryeh Deri, leader of the Shas party, reported that Gazahay's remarks had been taken out of context from a two-hour lecture recorded four years earlier. Several members of Shas and figures from religious communities defended Gazahay, describing the criticism as part of a smear campaign aimed at damaging his reputation.

After widespread criticism over controversial remarks he made in past lectures, including statements about women that many found offensive, he withdrew his candidacy and resigned his place on the Shas list and did not join the Knesset.
