= Anan (amora) =

3rd-century Babylonian rabbi and amora

Rav Anan (Jewish Babylonian Aramaic: רב ענן) was a Babylonian rabbi of the third century (second generation of amoraim).

== Biography ==
He was a student of Samuel of Nehardea, and contemporary of Rav Huna and Mar Ukba II.

The book Tanna Devei Eliyahu is said to have been composed during visitations Anan received from the prophet Elijah. Anan was also very careful not judge any case where he might show the slightest favoritism to one side; it is said that once this conscientiousness inadvertently lead to a miscarriage of justice, and as a result Elijah ceased to visit Anan, until Anan fasted and begged for Eliyah to return.

Anan was prominent as a teacher of civil law and of ritual; and though Rav Nachman once criticized one of his arguments — remarking, "While attending Mar Samuel, you must have spent your time in playing at checkers" (or "chess," Iskundré) — he highly respected him, and addressed him with the title of Mar ("Master"). Rav Huna, for his part, did not consider Anan his equal; and when the latter once addressed to him a message, headed, "To Huna, our colleague, greetings," he felt himself depreciated and replied in a manner that embarrassed Anan.

Anan rarely appears in the field of aggadah, and then only as the transmitter of teachings of his predecessors. But many of his teachings were probably incorporated with those of the students of the school that bore his name, Debei Rav Anan. In addition to the above, he is mentioned in many other places.
