= Ein Yaakov =

Book by Yaʿaḳov Ben-Shelomoh Ibn-Ḥaviv

Ein Yaakov (Hebrew: עין יעקב, "Jacob's Well") is a 16th-century compilation of all the Aggadic material in the Talmud together with commentaries. Its introduction contains an account of the history of Talmudic censorship and the term Gemara. It was compiled by Jacob ibn Habib and (after his death) by his son Levi ibn Habib.

Although ibn Habib intended his work for a wide audience, including the rabbinic elite, Ein Yaakov was "especially treasured by laborers and others" who lacked the schooling to learn the more difficult parts of the Talmud. Some synagogues hold daily Ein Yaakov classes.

== Commentaries ==
Dozens of commentaries on the Ein Yaakov have been composed, and some editions contain 20 or more. These are some of the most notable commentaries:

- HaKotev (before 1516): Ibn Habib's own commentary. In the edition princeps his comments are marked by א"ה, "so says the author," and later editions call it HaKotev, "the author".
- Hiddushei Aggadot (before 1631): A work by Samuel Eidels which is often treated as a commentary to the Talmud, but Eidels writes in the introduction that his aim is "to compose a commentary to all the tales in the Ein Yaakov".
- Beit Yehuda (1634-6): Leon da Modena's commentary, which appeared in all editions between 1684 and 1916. Later editions call it HaBoneh. This is one of his most mature works, according to Ellis Rivkin. Da Modena also compiled an index to the Ein Yaakov, titled Beit Lehem Yehuda.
- Meor Einayim (1643): Josiah Pinto's commentary.
- (Before 1655): Commentary by Hayyim ben Abraham ha-Kohen, of which only the opening two folios survive, in a possible holograph manuscript. Published in Kovetz beit aharon veyisrael. 1993. 8 (1): 5-15.
- (Before 1667): Commentary of Nathan Shapira of Jerusalem, preserved MS Columbia X 893 L 973 and BL Add. MS 27020.
- Asaf HaMazkir (before 1672): A bibliographic work by Zechariah ben Ephraim Porto of Urbino. Included in back of Amsterdam, 1724.
- Kotnot Or (1683): Commentary of Isaac Meir Teomim-Frankel.
- Iyyun Yaakov (1729): Jacob Reischer's.
- Yashresh Yaakov (1729): Hayyim Abulafia's.
- Shevut Yaakov (1734): An expanded commentary by Hayyim Abulafia.
- (before 1746): Moshe Chaim Luzzatto supposedly composed a commentary, now lost.
- Petah Einayim (1790): Chaim Yosef David Azulai's.
- Ein Avraham (1848): Abraham ben Aryeh Loeb Schick's.
- Yad Yosef, Etz Yosef, Anaf Yosef (before 1867): Enoch Zundel ben Joseph's three commentaries.
- Or haChayyim (1883): Commentary by Mordecai Jaffe of Plungė (1814-1883) to the Yerushalmi sections, compiled largely from the Korban Ha-Edah and the Pnei Moshe. First printed in Vilna, 1883.
- Ein Ayyah (1883-1935): A lengthy commentary by Abraham Isaac Kook, published in 4 volumes.

== Translations ==
=== Yiddish ===
- Mayse-bukh (1602): The Ein Yaakov served as a source for this Yiddish collection.
- Drashot uFerushim al Ein Yaakov (18th century): Jonah Wehle of Prague, a Frankist, composed a Yiddish commentary which is still in manuscript.
- HaMeturgeman (1883): Much of the more obscure vocabulary was translated into Yiddish by Mordecai Jaffe of Plungė (1814-1883), printed as a running commentary to Vilna, 1883.
- Ein Yaakov . . . Perush Ivri Deutsch: A Yiddish translation by Yosef Meir Yaavetz first printed in Warsaw, 1886.

=== German ===
- Der babylonische Talmud in seinen haggadischen Bestandtheilen (1886-1888): An abridged translation by August Wünsche in two volumes.

=== English ===
- En Jacob: Agada of the Babylonian Talmud (1916-1921): A slightly abridged bilingual edition in 5 volumes (I, II, III, IV, V) edited and translated by Samuel Hirsch Glick (c. 1884-8 September 1929). It does not include any of the classic commentaries, relying instead on Glick's translation and footnotes.
- Ein Yaakov: The Ethical and Inspirational Teachings of the Talmud (1999): A one-volume English translation by Avraham Yaakov Finkel.
- The Schottenstein Edition Ein Yaakov (2019-): A bilingual edition published by ArtScroll, of which 16 volumes have so far been released. A Tisha B'Av miscellany was also released in 2022.

=== French ===
- Aggadoth du Talmud de Babylone (1982): Translation by Arlette Elkaïm-Sartre, introduced by Marc-Alain Ouaknin. Based largely on Glick's English, with some content restored from the original.

=== Russian ===
- Rohr Family Edition Ein Yaakov: A six-volume Russian translation by Boruch Gorin was completed in 2016 and published by LeChaim.
