= Ein Ayah =

Commentary on Ein Yaakov - a compilation of all the Aggadic material in the Talmud

Ein Ayah (Hebrew: עין איה) is a commentary on Ein Yaakov - a compilation of all the Aggadic material in the Talmud - by Rabbi Abraham Isaac Kook, the first Ashkenazi chief rabbi of British Mandatory Palestine and founder of Yeshiva Mercaz HaRav Kook.

The source of the name Ein Ayah ("Eye of Ayah") is found in the verse in the Book of Job (28:7): "Nativ did not know an eagle and did not pin an eye on Ayah." Ayah is a bird with a sharp vision. The name implies that the author is paving a new way to study a legend. The name also hints at the name of the author (Ayah evokes HaRaAYaH, the acronym for the rabbi's Hebrew name) and the name of Ein Ya'akov.

In his introduction, Rav Kook writes that he came to write it because of the scarcity (in quality and quantity) of "easy to read" Jewish books in his time. The commentary is presented in numbered paragraphs corresponding to the Talmudic text, and it expands upon many diverse subjects in an allegorical style. The book's introduction is considered significant in its own right. Among other things, Rav Kook presents a historical and philosophical view of the Second Temple period, during which rabbis and Talmudic scholars faced significant persecution from Roman authorities.

Rav Kook began writing the book at the age of 18. It appears that his original intention was to write a comprehensive commentary on all the legends of the Talmud. Completion of the book was delayed for many reasons over the years, however, and as a result, there are significant differences in the style and character of writing throughout it. Much of the book was written during Rav Kook's rabbinical period in Latvia, and the minority after his immigration to the Land of Israel. The print edition of the book comprises four volumes, which speaks to the large amount of content in Ein Yaakov. The manuscript of the book was edited multiple times for publication: once in Eastern Europe and the other in Jaffa (the Jaffa edition was published in full by the Hartzia Institute). At the end of his life, Rav Kook began to write another edition of the book, which included an interpretation of three pages of the Gemara. This last addition is presented in the new prints at the end of the first and fourth volumes.

Rav Kook's writings are extensive, and he is considered one of the most celebrated and influential rabbis of the 20th century. Some rabbis recommend that students of his begin studying his writings with Ein Ayah.
