= Jacob ibn Habib =

Jacob ben Solomon ibn Habib (Hebrew: יעקב בן שלמה אבן חביב) (alternative transliteration: Yaakov ben Shlomo ibn Habib) (c. 1460 – 1516) was a rabbi and talmudist, best known as the author of Ein Yaakov, a compilation of all the Aggadic material in the Talmud together with commentaries.

== Biography ==
Jacob Ibn Habib was born at Zamora, Spain. In his youth he studied the Talmud under Rabbi Samuel Valensi.

In 1492, when the Jews were expelled from Spain, he settled at Salonica, where he wrote his Ein Yaakov in the house of Don Judah Benveniste, grandson of Don Abraham Benveniste, who placed his rich library at his disposal. Ibn Ḥabib also availed himself of the library of Don Shemuel Benveniste the brother of Judah, which contained, among other great works, a large collection of novellæ on the Talmud by many distinguished commentators. By the aid of the works from these two libraries Ibn Ḥabib collected all the aggadic passages from the Babylonian Talmud, and many from the Jerusalem Talmud.

The publication of this work began in 1516 in the printing establishment of Judah Gedaliah, the author himself carefully reading the proof-sheets; but he died at Salonica just as the first two orders (Zeraim and Moed) came from the press. His son Levi completed the labors of his father, but the work appeared before the public without the notes of the author to the last four orders (sedarim), and without the index, which the author originally intended to cover the entire work. The aggadot of the Jerusalem Talmud are also lacking.

== Works ==
The Ein Yaakov is the only work Ibn Ḥabib left. The object of the author was to familiarize the public with the ethical spirit of Talmudic literature, and to propagate a more rationalistic view of the Talmudic Aggadah. At the same time his notes were intended to refute the charges brought against the Talmud by the numerous Spanish converts. The book, which thus appealed to the mass of the unlearned, became very popular.

Ein Yaakov was often edited and annotated, and served as a text-book of religious instruction. There are over thirty editions known; the 1906 edition (Vilna, 1883; Elijah Schik) contains twenty commentaries, among them one which consists of selections from more than one hundred homiletic works. Of the additions, the most important one is that of Leone di Modena, under the title Ha-Boneh, which has appeared in all editions since 1684. In some editions the title of the whole work is Ein Yisrael.
