= Enoch Zundel ben Joseph =

Polish Rabbi

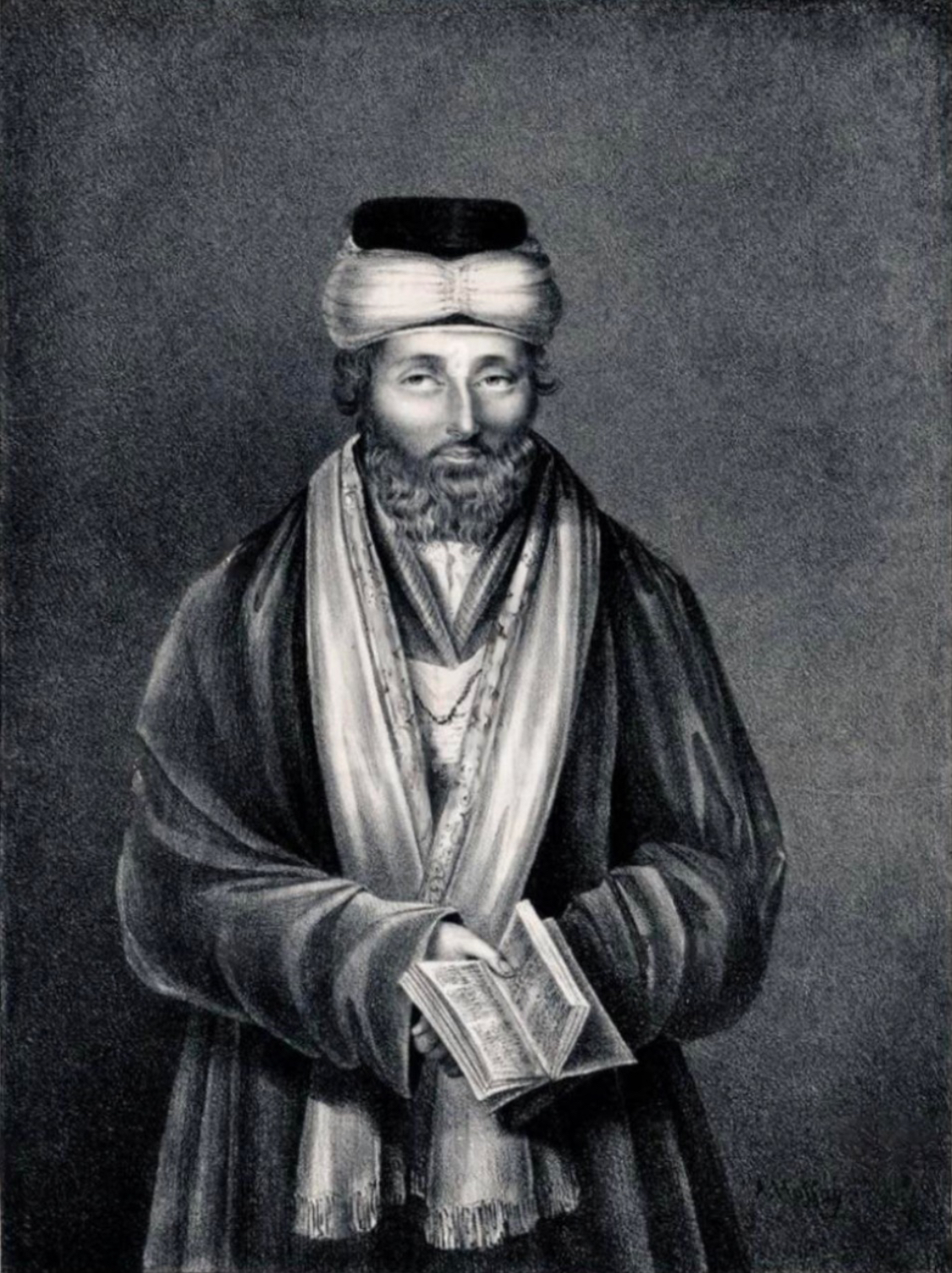

Enoch Zundel ben Joseph (Hebrew: חנוך זונדל בן יוסף; died 1867) was a Polish Talmudist best known as author of three commentaries on Ein Yaakov, He authored the books "Etz Yosef" (Joseph's Tree), "Anaf Yosef" (Joseph's Branch), and "Yad Yosef" (Joseph's Hand). He also wrote commentaries on Midrash Rabbah, Midrash Tanchuma and others. He spent his life in Białystok, Poland; he was a maggid there and gave shiurim on Midrash.

== Biography ==
He was born to Rabbi Yosef and Leah. He resided in Bialystok, where he served as a preacher and also delivered lessons in "Chevrat Midrash" on the Midrashim of the Sages. Not much is known about him, but in a Bialystok notebook, Abraham Shmuel Hirschberg writes about him, stating that the elders of Bialystok considered him a righteous individual and "a person of standing."

Rabbi Zundel composed commentaries on various Midrashic works such as Midrash Rabbah, Midrash Tanchuma, Aggadat Bereshit, Ein Yaakov, and Seder Olam. His commentaries were divided into two: a concise explanation called "Etz Yosef" and an expanded commentary with innovations called "Anaf Yosef." He named his commentaries after his father, Rabbi Yosef. His books consist of a compilation of previous commentaries (such as "Yafeh Toar" by Rabbi Shmuel Yafeh Ashkenazi or commentaries on the Nevi'im and Ketuvim by early commentators) as well as his own original insights.

In addition, he authored commentaries of a similar nature on the prayer liturgy. These commentaries were included in the book "Otzar HaTefilot" (Treasury of Prayers).

His books received recommendations from Rabbi Yosef Shaul Nathanson, Rabbi Shmuel Avigdor Tosafot, Rabbi Aryeh Leib Katzenellenbogen, and others.

== Publications ==
He is author of the following works:

- A threefold commentary on Midrash Rabbah of the Pentateuch and five Megillot, in two parts (Wilna and Grodno, 1829–34; 2d ed., Wilna, 1845). It is composed of Etz Yosef ("Tree of Joseph"), which explains it according to the simple explanation of its meaning; Anaf Yosef ("Branch of Joseph"), which explains it homiletically; and Yad Yosef, which cross-references it to other midrashim. He writes in his introduction to the work that he named the work after his father. His commentary received approbations from numerous rabbis, among them Rabbi Yaakov Tzvi Mecklenburg, author of HaKetav VeHaKabbalah.
- A twofold commentary on Midrash Tanchuma (ib. 1833)
- A threefold commentary on Seder 'Olam (ib. 1845)
- Commentary on Midrash Samuel (Stettin, 1860)
- Mibḥar Mi-Peninim, a commentary on the Midrash Rabbah of the Pentateuch (Warsaw, 1870)
- Novellæ on the Haggadah of the Talmud (Wilna, 1883)—these commentaries are, in fact, compilations from other commentaries, especially those of Samuel Jafe Ashkenazi, Hellin, and Bärman Ashkenazi, to which Enoch added novellæ of his own
- Olat ha-Ḥodesh, prayers for the new moon, with treatises on fast-days, philanthropy, etc. (ib. 1859)
- A commentary on Pesikta Rabbati
- Hoi Ariel, a funeral sermon on the death of R. Löb Katzenellenbogen of Brest (ib. 1838), a reference to Isaiah 29:1
- Avel Kaved, a eulogy for Rabbi Yitzchak Isaac Tiktin
- A Twofold commentary on the siddur [Jewish Prayer Book]

== Jewish Encyclopedia bibliography ==
- Fürst, Bibl. Jud. ii. 107-108, iii. 396;
- Fuenn, Keneset Yisrael, p. 312;
- Eliezer Kohn, Ḳin'at Soferim, p. 107.
