= Josiah ben Joseph Pinto =

Rabbi in the Ottoman Empire (1565–1648)

Josiah ben Joseph Pinto (c. 1565 - c. 1648) (Hebrew: יאשיהו בן יוסף פינטו) was a Syrian rabbi and preacher born in Damascus. His father, Joseph Pinto, was one of the rich and charitable men of that city. Josiah was a pupil of various rabbis in Talmud and Kabala, and later, after his father's death, he studied Talmud under Jacob Abulafia, who ordained him as rabbi. Pinto's permanent residence was in Damascus, where later he officiated as rabbi until his death in Feb. or March 1648. He went twice to Aleppo, and in 1625 he moved to Safed with the intention of settling there, but the death of his young son, Joseph, which occurred a year later, induced him to return to Damascus.

== Works ==
Pinto was the author of the following works:

- Kesef Nibḥar (Damascus, 1616), a collection of homilies and comments on Genesis and Exodus
- Kesef Mezuḳḳaḳ (finished 1625, and published at Venice, 1628), a homiletic commentary on the Pentateuch, followed by a pamphlet entitled Kesef To'afot, glosses on the Pentateuch
- Me'or 'Enayim, commentary on Jacob ibn Ḥabib's En Ya'aḳob, which is a collection of the haggadot of the Babylonian Talmud (part i, with the text, Venice, 1643; part ii, with other commentaries and the text, Amsterdam, 1754)
- Kesef Ẓaruf (ib. 1714), commentary on Proverbs
- Nibḥar mi-Kesef (Aleppo, 1869).

Some of his responsa are to be found in the collection of Yom-Ṭob Ẓahalon and in Aaron Alfandari's Yad Aharon. His unpublished works are: Kesef Nim'as, a commentary on Lamentations, Ḳebuẓẓat Kesef, a collection of civil laws and of laws concerning women, and a collection of responsa.
