= Leone Modena =

Venetian Jewish scholar (1571–1648)

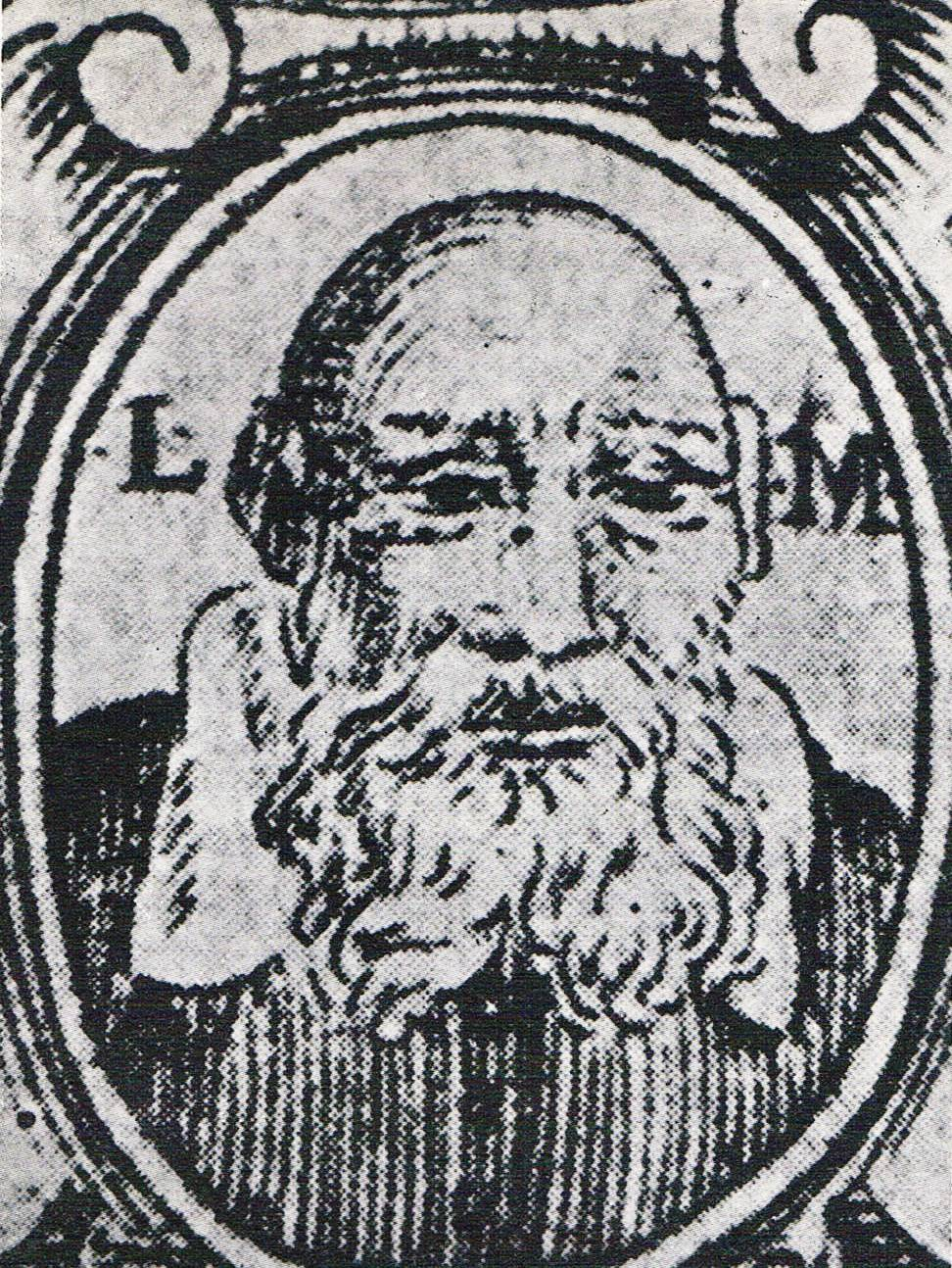
Leon of Modena

Leone Modena (Leon of Modena, da Venezia; Hebrew: יְהוּדָה אַרְיֵה מִמּוֹדִינָא, romanized: Yəhud̲ā Aryē miModenā), (1571–1648) was a Jewish scholar born in Venice to a family whose ancestors migrated to Italy after an expulsion of Jews from France.

== Life ==
Leon Modena was born in Venice, of a notable French family which had migrated to Italy after the expulsion of the Jews from France. He was an intelligent child and a respected rabbi in Venice. However, his reputation within traditional Judaism suffered for several reasons, including an unyielding criticism of emerging sects within Judaism, an addiction to gambling, and a lack of stable character. As Heinrich Graetz points out, this last factor prevented his gifts from maturing: "He pursued all sorts of occupations to support himself, viz. those of preacher, teacher of Jews and Christians, reader of prayers, interpreter, writer, proof-reader, bookseller, broker, merchant, rabbi, musician, matchmaker and manufacturer of amulets." One of his students was Azaria Piccio, "one of the last great talmudists produced by Italian Jewry", with whom he would later be intellectually close.

Leon of Modena earned a place in Jewish history in part by his criticism of the mystical approach to Judaism. One of his most effective works was his attack on Kabbalah, the Ari Nohem, first published in 1840. In it, he attempted to demonstrate that the "Bible of the Kabbalists" (the Zohar) was a modern composition. He also wrote that the name "Ḥokhmat HaQabbalah" (the wisdom of Kabbalah) is misleading since it is neither "wisdom" nor a Kabbalah (a tradition going back to Moses) but a mere fabrication. He became best known, however, as the interpreter of Judaism to the Christian world. He was also the author of anti-Catholic apologia.

He wrote an autobiography entitled "Ḥayye Yehuda" "Life of Judah". In this highly candid and sometimes emotional work, he admitted to being a compulsive gambler. He mourned his children, two of whom died in his lifetime - one died early from exposure to fumes from his lab experiments with alchemy; a second son Zvulun, he of the angelic voice, was murdered in front of his father in a criminal gang killing; a third son was a ne'er-do-well who traveled to the Empire of Brazil and returned to Venice only after his father's death.

Leon's 1626 book Tzori la-nefesh u-marpeh la-etsem (Balm for the Soul and Cure for the Bone), written for Venice's Ashkenazi burial society, was one of the first such texts written for laypeople who cared for the sick and dying. He wrote that he intended to set out a Jewish method for ritualizing death so that the Jewish community would not "do less than the people around us [i.e., Christians] by not taking care that when someone is on his deathbed he should meet his Maker in a state of supplication and confession of his sins and transgressions."

Rabbi Modena attracted many upper-crust Venetians to the synagogue in the Venetian Ghetto who wanted to hear his sermons. He had many connections with Englishmen including the ambassador of King James I to Venice, Sir Henry Wotton and his chaplain, William Bedell. Rabbi Modena taught Hebrew to Bedell, who in turn introduced Rabbi Modena to Christian interpretations of the Bible. At the behest of Wotton Rabbi Modena prepared a comprehensive guide to Judaism for Christian readers, Historia de gli riti Hebraici (Paris, 1637). This book was the first Jewish text addressed to non-Jewish readers since the days of Josephus and Philo.

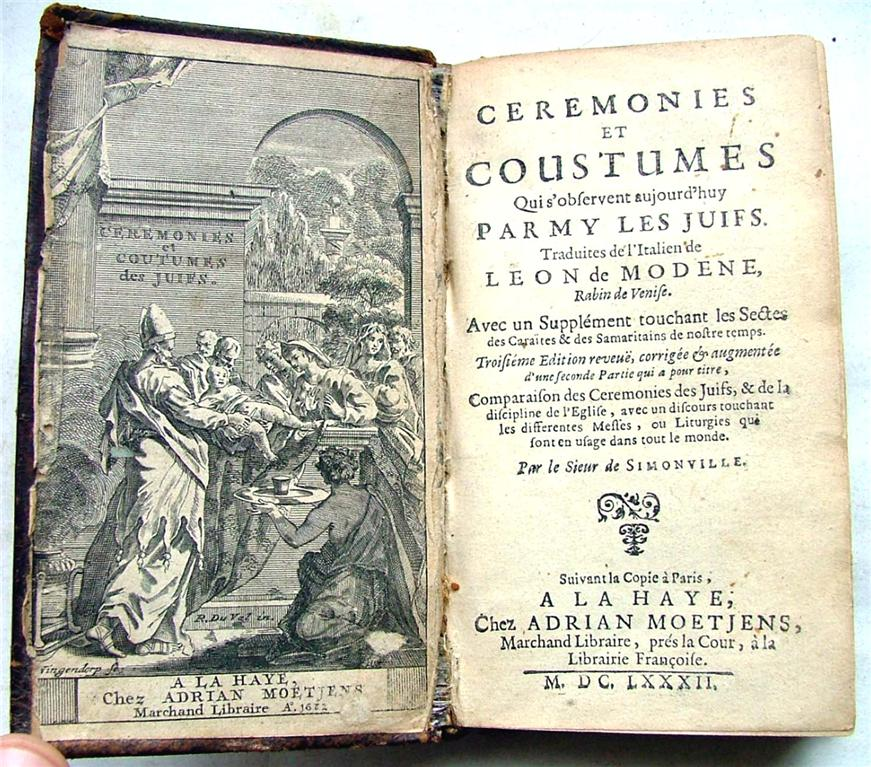
Cérémonies et coutumes parmi les Juifs by Leon of Modena, translated by French biblical scholar Richard Simon.

The innovative work, which was originally commissioned for presentation to King James I, arose out of Modena’s intense participation in the culture of international diplomacy in Venice. The text was translated by Christians into Dutch, English (three separate versions), French, German, and Latin in addition to being re-printed in the original Italian some eight times. It became the foundation of a hybrid Christian–Jewish discourse of Judaism and religious tolerance. French priest Richard Simon translated it into French from the original Italian for presentation to Boussuet and the Port-Royal. In 1650 it was translated into English by Edmund Chilmead: The history of the rites, customes, and manner of life, of the present Jews, throughout the world. At the time the Jewish question, the issue of whether Jews should be permitted to resettle in Britain, was coming to the fore in London, and Leon of Modena’s book did much to stimulate popular interest.

Among his deepest interests was music. He served as cantor at the synagogue in the Venetian Ghetto for more than forty years. Earlier, he is believed to have introduced some polyphony in the synagogue at Ferrara, and wrote two essays on music justifying polyphonic practice in services and celebrations. Modena was certainly a musician and a friend of Salamone Rossi; it is not clear whether he was also a composer.

He called for religious reform in the Beit Yehuda and other works. According to some 19th-century scholars, he attacked traditional Judaism in a pseudonymous work entitled Qol Sakal; however, this book was not his.

== Writings ==
Magen VaHerev (מגן וחרב "Shield and Sword") is a polemic attack upon Christian dogmas. In Magen VaHerev, Leon Modena takes Christians to task for their interpretations of Hebrew scriptures and refutes the claims of Jesus.

His written works include:

- She'elot uTeshuvot Ziqnei Yehudah (Collected Responsa, Mossad HaRav Kook ed. Shelomo Simonson, 1956 )
- Beit Lechem Yehudah (Anthology of statements of Hazal) organized by topic, Venice, 1625 and Prague, 1705
- Diwan (Collected Poems, JTS Publications, ed. Shimon Bernstein, 1932
- Ari Nohem (See above)
- Kitvei Y. A. Modena (Letters and musings, ed. Yehuda Blau, Budapest, 1906)
- Magen VeTzinah (Responsa, ed. A. Geiger, Breslau, 1857)
- Tzemach Tzadiq (A Righteous Sprout: An ethical treatise inspired by Fiore di virtù) Translated into English by Ralph Anzarouth
- Lev HaAryeh (Monograph on Memory improvement and Mnemonics, in which he greatly extols the use of the method of loci )
- Sur MeRa (A philosophical dialogue on gambling, written at the age of 13, Amsterdam 1692 , Vilna 1896
- Historia de' riti hebraici (See above, translated into Hebrew by Shelomo Rabin, Vienna, 1867 )
- Pi HaAryeh (Italian-Hebrew dictionary of all difficult words in the Hebrew Bible), Venice 1640
- HaBoneh, commentary on Ein Yaakov; pub. Venice 1635, and reprinted with Ein Yaakov itself since 1684.
- Chaye Yehudah (See above)
- Tzori la-nefesh u-marpeh la-etsem (Balm for the Soul and Cure for the Bone), Venice, 1626

== Appearances in popular culture ==
Leon of Modena is the basis of the character Judah Aryeh in the novel People of the Book by Geraldine Brooks.

Leon of Modena is depicted in a children’s book called The Painter and the Rabbi, it depicts an alleged relationship Leon had with the noted painter Tintoretto. The book is based on stories told by docents at Jewish Museum of Venice, although there is no proof of said relationship, there is certainly mythology about it. Published by Kalaniot Books, 2021, written by Shoshana Weiss and illustrated by Jennifer Kirkham.
