= Aggadah =

Non-legalistic exegetical texts in the classical rabbinic literature

Aggadah (Hebrew: אַגָּדָה, romanized: Aggāḏā, or הַגָּדָה Haggāḏā; Jewish Babylonian Aramaic: אֲגַדְתָּא, romanized: Ăg̱aḏtā; 'tales', 'legend', 'lore') is the non-legalistic exegesis which appears in the classical rabbinic literature of Judaism, particularly the Talmud and Midrash. In general, Aggadah is a compendium of rabbinic texts that incorporates folklore, historical anecdotes, moral exhortations, and practical advice in various spheres, from business to medicine. The predominant rabbinic holding is that Aggadah is meant to impart moral or theological truths through the form of allegory in order to be accessible, and it does not have to be taken literally.

== Etymology ==
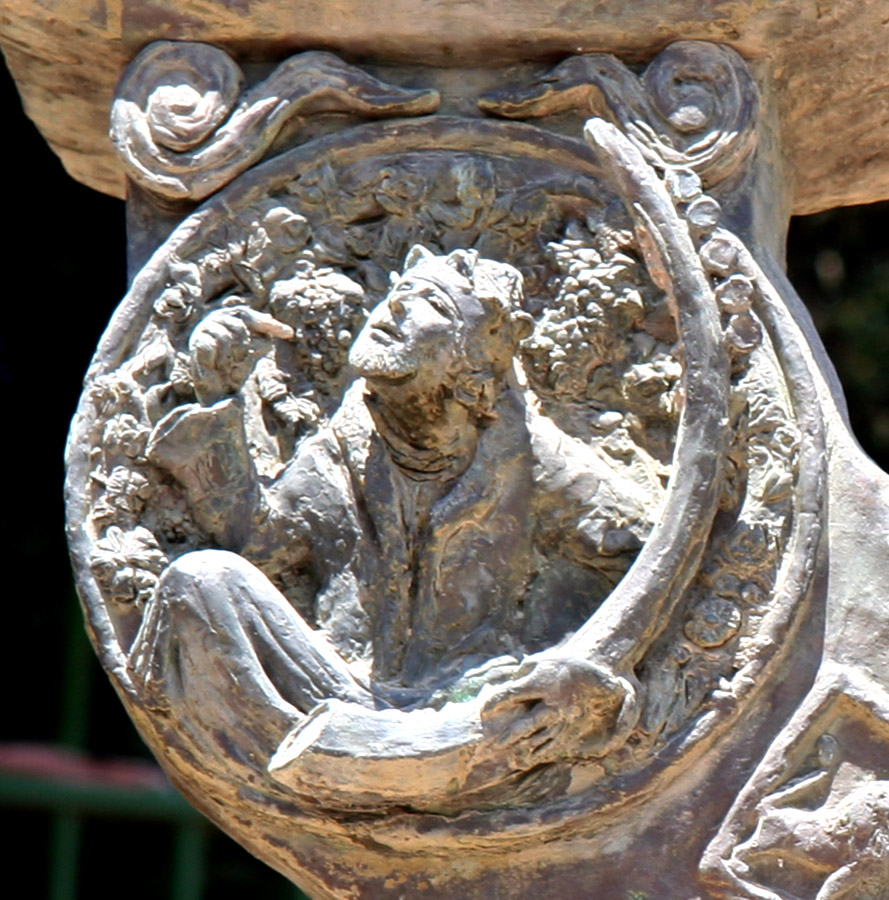
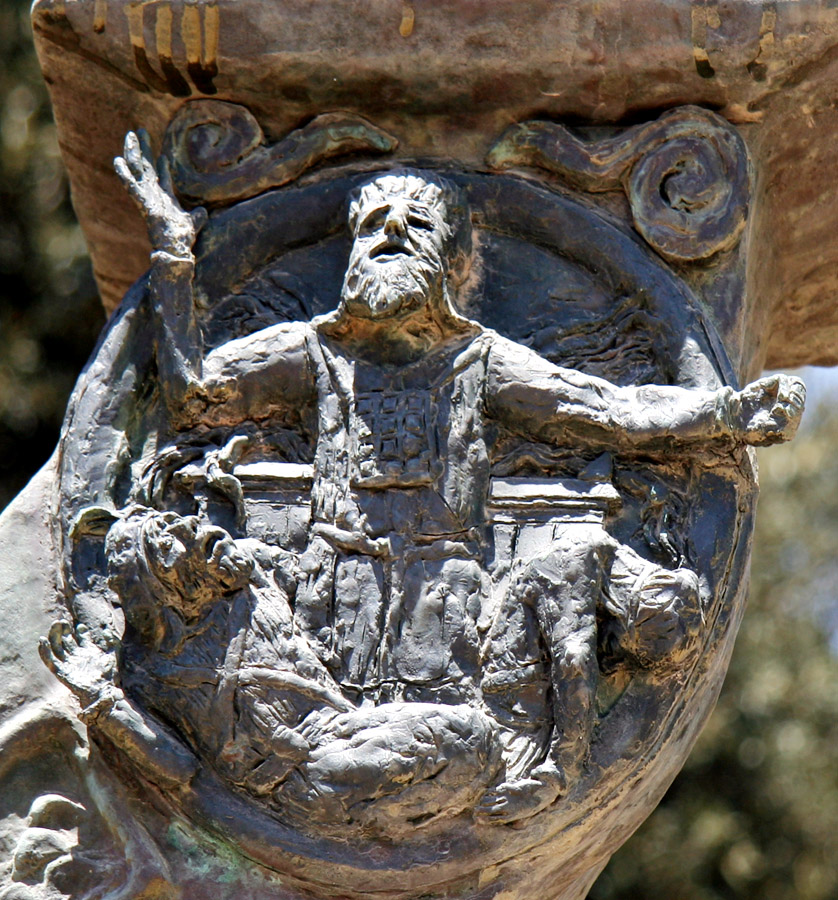
The artistic freedom spirit of Aggadah (left, represented by Solomon) and the legal divine judgment rulings of Halakhah (right, represented by Aaron and his sons) on the Knesset Menorah

The majority scholarly opinion is that the Hebrew word aggadah (אַגָּדָה) and corresponding Aramaic aggadta (אֲגַדְתָּא) are variants of haggadah based on a common linguistic shift from haphalah to aphalah forms. However, a minority of scholars believe that these words derive from a separate Aramaic root נגד meaning "draw, pull, spread, stretch" (corresponding to the Hebrew root משך or נטה).

According to the latter etymology, aggadah may be seen as "the part of the Torah which draws man towards its teachings", or the teachings which strengthen one's religious experience and spiritual connections, in addition to explaining texts. (See similar re Masorah – in the sense of "tradition" – at Masoretic Text § Etymology.)

== As part of the Oral Torah ==
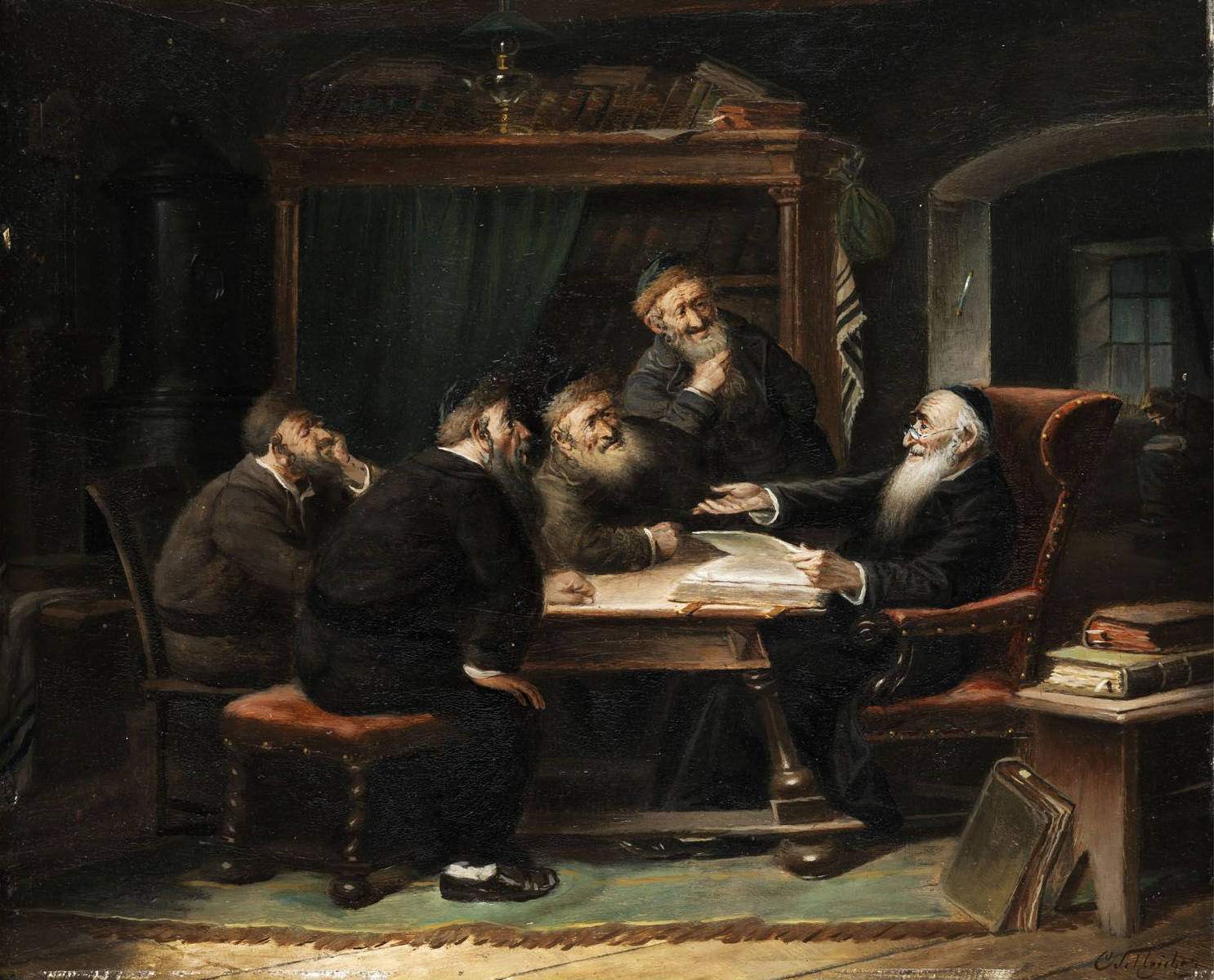
In his Jüdische Szene 1, Carl Schleicher depicts a rabbi offering his interpretation of an aggadah.

The Aggadah is part of Judaism's Oral Torah, the traditions providing the authoritative interpretation of the Written Torah. In this context, the widely-held view in rabbinic literature is that the Aggadah is in fact a medium for the transmission of fundamental teachings (Homiletic Sayings—מאמרים לימודיים) or for explanations of verses in the Hebrew Bible (Exegetic Sayings—מאמרים ביאוריים). Rabbinic thought, therefore, understands much of the Aggadah as containing a hidden, allegorical dimension, in addition to its overt, literal sense. In general, where a literal interpretation contradicts rationality, the rabbis seek an allegorical explanation: "We are told to use our common sense to decide whether an aggada is to be taken literally or not" (Carmell, 2005).

=== Literal-allegorical teachings ===
Moshe Chaim Luzzatto (1707–1746), discusses this two-tiered, literal-allegorical mode of transmission of the Aggadah in his Discourse on the Haggadot. He explains that the Oral Law, in fact, comprises two components: the legal component (חלק המצוות), discussing the mitzvot and halakha; and "the secret" component (חלק הסודות), discussing the deeper teachings. The Aggadah, along with the Kabbalah, falls under the latter. The rabbis of the Mishnaic era (c. 10 – c. 220 CE) believed that it would be dangerous to record the deeper teachings in an explicit, mishnah-like, medium. Rather, they would be conveyed in a "concealed mode" and via "paradoxes". (Due to their value, these teachings should not become accessible to those "of bad character"; and due to their depth they should not be made available to those "not schooled in the ways of analysis".) This mode of transmission nevertheless depended on consistent rules and principles such that those "equipped with the keys" would be able to unlock their meaning; to others they would appear as non-rational or fantastic.

=== Interpretation of the Aggadah ===
In line with the above, Samuel ibn Naghrillah (993–1056), in his "Introduction to the Talmud", states that "Aggadah comprises any comment occurring in the Talmud on any topic which is not a commandment (i.e. which is not halachic) and one should derive from it only that which is reasonable." As regards this, Maimonides (1138–1204), in his preface to the tenth chapter of Tractate Sanhedrin (Perek Chelek), describes three possible approaches to the interpretation of the Aggadah:

- The first approach (usually that of the uneducated) is to accept the Aggadah as literally true, without admission of any hidden, allegorical explanation—even where a literal interpretation runs counter to common sense. Maimonides treats this approach dismissively.
- The second approach (usually of "doctors and philosophers") assumes that anything said by the Sages was intended literally, and therefore rejects as impossible the non-rational or fantastic teachings (and consequently these regard the Sages as "simpletons and ignoramuses"). Maimonides does not entirely reject rationalist interpretation, but he opposes an exegetical approach which denies the Aggadah a hidden rationality. "The sages presented their drashot in a style by which the mind of a fool will reject them because of his way of thinking; it is improper to assign any deficiency to the drash—one may rather suspect that the deficiency is a result of his intellectual shortcomings" (Commentary on the Mishnah: Introduction).
- The third approach (taken by very few) involves recognising that many Aggadot are intended to teach profound truths, and that the teachings thus operate on two levels: "overt" and "hidden". Thus any impossible assertion was, in fact, intended as a parable; further, where aggadot can be understood literally, they may be taken on this level. This is, in general, the view of the Rabbis. "It is proper ... to carefully analyse [the Aggadot] ... when any of these seem far-fetched we must immerse ourselves in the various branches of knowledge until we understand the concepts." (Maimonides, op cit.)

Maimonides' approach is also widely held amongst the non-rationalistic, mystical streams of Judaism—thus, for example, Isaiah Horowitz (c. 1555 – 1630) holds that "none of these sometimes mind-boggling 'stories' are devoid of profound meaning; if anyone is devoid of understanding, it is the reader" (Shnei Luchos HaBris, introduction). See also the Maharal's approach.

=== In the Talmud and Midrash ===
The Aggadah is today recorded in the Midrash and the Talmud.

In the Midrash, the aggadic and halakhic material are compiled as two distinct collections:

1. The Aggadic Midrashim, generally, are explanatory aggadah, deriving the "sermonic implications" from the biblical text.
2. The Halakhic Midrashim derive the laws from the text.

Many of the Torah commentaries, as well as the Targumim, interpret the Torah text in the light of Aggadic statements, particularly those in the Midrash, and hence contain much material on Aggadah interpretation.

Throughout the Talmud, aggadic and halakhic material are interwoven—legal material comprises around 90%. (Tractate Avoth, which has no gemara, deals exclusively with non-halakhic material, though it is not regarded as aggadic in that it focuses largely on character development.) The Talmudic Aggadah, generally, convey the "deeper teachings"—though in concealed mode, as discussed. The aggadic material in the Babylonian Talmud is also presented separately in Ein Yaakov, a compilation of the Aggadah together with commentaries.

Well-known works interpreting the Aggadot in the Talmud include:

- Chiddushei Aggados (Novellæ on the Aggadot) by Samuel Edels (1555–1631).
- Chiddushei Aggados (Novellae on the Aggadot) by Judah Loew (as well as many other works by Loew, especially Be'er ha-Golah).
- Yehoyada and MeKabtziel (names based on 2 Samuel 23:20) by Yosef Hayyim.
- Beur Aggados (Clarification of the Aggadot) and Perush al Kamma Aggadot (Commentary on several Aggadot) by the Vilna Gaon.
- Ein Yaakov (En Jacob) Agada of the Babylonian Talmud by Jacob ibn Habib (Translated into English, 1916, by Samuel Hirsch Glick).
- Etz Yosef, Anaf Yosef and Yad Yosef—as well as others—by Zundel ben Joseph
- Ein Ayah four volume commentary on Ein Yaakov by Abraham Isaac Kook (1865–1935)

== Development ==
The Aggadah has been preserved in a series of different works, which, like all works of traditional literature, have come to their present form through previous collections and revisions. Their original forms existed long before they were reduced to writing.

The first traces of the midrashic exegesis are found in the Bible itself; while in the time of the Soferim the development of the Midrash Aggadah received a mighty impetus, and the foundations were laid for public services which were soon to offer the chief medium for the cultivation of Bible exegesis.

Abtalion and Shemaiah are the first to bear the title darshan, and it was probably by no mere chance that their pupil Hillel was the first to lay down hermeneutic rules for the interpretation of the Midrash; he may have been indebted to his teachers for the tendency toward aggadic interpretation. These two scholars are the first whose sayings are recorded in the aggadah. The new method of derush (Biblical interpretation) introduced by Abtalion and Shemaiah seems to have evoked opposition among the Pharisees.

Much Aggadah, often mixed with foreign elements, is found in the Apocrypha, the Pseudepigrapha, the works of Josephus and Philo, and the remaining Judæo-Hellenistic literature; but aggadic exegesis reached its highest development in the great epoch of the Mishnaic-Talmudic period, between 100 and 550 CE.

The Aggadah of the Amoraim (sages of the Talmud) is the continuation of that of the Tannaim (sages of the Mishna). The final edition of the Mishnah, which was of such signal importance for the Halakah, is of less significance for the Aggadah, which, in form as well as in content, shows the same characteristics in both periods.

=== Exegetic and homiletic Aggadah ===
It is important to emphasize the fundamental difference in plan between the midrashim forming a running commentary (מאמרים ביאוריים) to the Scripture text, and the homiletic midrashim (מאמרים לימודיים). When the scholars undertook to edit, revise, and collect into individual midrashim the immense array of haggadot, they followed the method employed in the collections and revisions of the halakhot and the halakhic discussions. The form which suggested itself was to arrange in textual sequence the exegetical interpretations of the Biblical text as taught in the schools, or the occasional interpretations introduced into public discourses, etc., and which were in any way connected with Scripture. Since the work of the editor was often merely that of compilation, the existing midrashim show in many passages the character of the sources from which they were taken. This was the genesis of the midrashim which are in the nature of running haggadic commentaries to single books of the Bible, as Bereshit Rabbah, Eikah Rabbati, the midrashim to the other Megillot, etc. See Midrash for more details.

== Modern compilations ==
Ein Yaakov is a compilation of the aggadic material in the Babylonian Talmud together with commentary. It was compiled by Jacob ibn Habib and (after his death) by his son Levi ibn Habib, and was first published in Saloniki (Greece) in 1515. It was intended as a text of aggadah, that could be studied with "the same degree of seriousness as the Talmud itself".

Popularized anthologies did not appear until more recently—these often incorporate "aggadot" from outside of classical Rabbinic literature. The major works include:

- Sefer Ha-Aggadah (The Book of Legends) is a classic compilation of aggadah from the Mishnah, the two Talmuds and the Midrash literature. It was edited by Hayim Nahman Bialik and Yehoshua Hana Rawnitzki. Bialik and Ravnitzky worked for three years to compile a comprehensive and representative overview of aggadah. When they found the same aggadah in multiple versions, from multiple sources, they usually selected the later form, the one found in the Babylonian Talmud. However, they also presented some aggadot sequentially, giving the early form from the Jerusalem Talmud, and later versions from the Babylonian Talmud, and from a classic midrash compilation. In each case every aggadah is given with its original source. In their original edition, they translated the Aramaic aggadot into modern Hebrew. Sefer Ha-Aggadah was first published in 1908–1911 in Odessa, Russia, then reprinted numerous times in Israel. In 1992 it was translated into English as The Book of Legends, by William G. Braude.
- Legends of the Jews, by Rabbi Louis Ginzberg, is an original synthesis of a vast amount of aggadah from the Mishnah, the two Talmuds and Midrash. Ginzberg had an encyclopedic knowledge of all rabbinic literature, and his masterwork included a massive array of aggadot. However he did not create an anthology which showed these aggadot distinctly. Rather, he paraphrased them and rewrote them into one continuous narrative that covered five volumes, followed by two volumes of footnotes that give specific sources.
- Mimekor Yisrael, by Micha Josef Berdyczewski. Berdichevsky was interested in compiling the folklore and legends of the Jewish people, from the earliest times up until the dawn of the modern era. His collection included a large array of aggadot, although they were limited to those he considered within the domain of folklore.
- The collected works of Dov Noy. In 1954, Noy established the Israel Folktale Archives and Ethnological Museum at the University of Haifa, an archive containing over 23,000 folktales collected from all the various ethnic communities who live in Israel.

== See also ==
- Aggadic Midrashim (category)
- Moses in rabbinic literature
- Pardes (Jewish exegesis)
