= Abraham Hochmuth =

Hungarian rabbi

Abraham Hochmuth (December 14, 1816 at Bán, Hungary – June 10, 1889 at Veszprém) was a Hungarian rabbi.

While attending the Charles University in Prague, he pursued the study of the Talmud with S. L. Rapoport. In 1846 he was appointed principal of the newly founded Jewish school at Miskolcz, where in 1850 he opened a private school. In 1852 he was called to the rabbinate of Kula; in 1860, to that of Veszprim. He was a prominent member of the Hungarian Jewish Congress and, later, of the board of the rabbinical seminary in Budapest. He was a contributor to "Ben Chananja," "Neuzeit," and other periodicals. His works include: "Die Jüdische Schule in Ungarn, Wie Sie Ist und Wie Sie Sein Soll," Miskolcz, 1851; "Leopold Löw als Theologe, Historiker und Publicist, Gewürdigt," Leipsic, 1871; "Gotteserkenntniss und Gottesverehrung auf Grundlage der Heiligen Schrift und Späterer Quellen, Bearbeitet als Lehr- und Handbuch zum Religionsunterricht" (also in Hungarian), Budapest, 1882.
