= Avraham Yaakov Finkel =

Rabbi Avraham Yaakov Finkel (1926 in Basel – 26 June 2016) was a noted author of English Judaica literature.

He was born in Basel, Switzerland and lived in The Hague, Netherlands until 1942, when he was deported to Bergen-Belsen by the Nazis. He resided in Brooklyn, New York until he died on June 26, 2016.

He is the author of 19 books including "The Essential Maimonides", "In My Flesh I See God", "The Responsa Anthology", and "The Great Torah Masters", published by Jason Aronson. He has also translated Ein Yaakov: "The Ethical and Inspirational Teachings of the Talmud in one volume"; and Nefesh Hachaim: "Rav Chaim of Volozhin's classic exploration of the fundamentals of Jewish belief".
