= Jacob ben Joseph Reischer =

Jacob ben Joseph Reischer (Bechofen) (1661–1733) was a Bohemian-Austrian rabbi and halakhist.

== Biography ==
Jacob Reischer was born in Prague. He was the son of Rabbi Joseph Reischer, author of Giv'ot 'Olam, and a pupil of R. Simon Spira of Prague. Reischer married Spira's granddaughter, the daughter of his son Benjamin Wolf.

== Rabbinic career ==
Reischer was dayyan at Prague, whence he was called to the rabbinate of Rzeszów in Galicia, deriving his name Reischer from that city, which is known as Reische among the Jews. He was subsequently called to the rabbinate of Ansbach, and then occupied a similar position at Worms, from 1713 to 1716, when he went to Metz, officiating there until his death in February 1733. He is buried in the Jewish cemetery in Metz.

== Published works ==
- Minḥat Ya'aḳov (Prague, 1689 et seq.), commentary on the Torat ha-Ḥaṭṭat of Moses Isserles, with many refutations and amplifications
- Torat ha-Shelamim, commentary on the Yoreh De'ah, Hilkot "Niddah", and on the Ḳonṭres ha-Sefeḳot of Shabbethai ha-Kohen, with an appendix containing eighteen responsa on various subjects (printed as the second part of the Minḥat Ya'aḳob, ib. 1689 et seq.)
- Ḥoḳ Ya'aḳov, commentary on Oraḥ Ḥayyim, Hilkot "Pesaḥ", first printed with the Shulhan Aruk, Oraḥ Ḥayyim (Dessau, 1696)
- Solet le-Minḥah, supplements to the Minḥat Ya'aḳov and the Torat ha-Shelamim, first printed with the Ḥoḳ Ya'aḳov (ib. 1696)
- Iyyun Ya'aḳov (Wilmersdorf, 1729), commentary on the En Ya'aḳov
- Shevut Ya'aḳov, responsa and decisions in three parts
1. (Halle, 1709), with the appendix Pe'er Ya'aḳov, containing novellæ on the treatises Berakot, Baba Ḳamma, and Giṭṭin
2. (Offenbach, 1719), treatises on the rules miggo and sefeḳ sefeḳa
3. (Metz, 1789), containing also his Lo Hibbiṭ Awen be-Ya'aḳob, a reply to the attacks of contemporary rabbis upon his Minḥat Ya'aḳob and Torat ha-Shelamim
