= Carl Schleicher =

Carl Schleicher (born Cölestin Schleicher, 1825 – October 2, 1903) was a realistic painter of the 19th century.

== Life ==
Schleicher was born in Lemberg (now Lviv), but he acquired his education in the field of painting mainly in Vienna between the years 1860 and 1870. He was a student of the Austrian painter Ferdinand Georg Waldmüller.

Schleicher is especially known for portrait paintings of faces, as well as interpretive paintings of rabbis who study the Talmud. A considerable amount of his paintings are oil paintings.

His paintings are an authentic record of Jewish culture and customs, as well as the rabbinic form of learning. These paintings have been exhibited several times at the Austrian Art Club (Österreichisches Kunstverein).

Schleicher's paintings are both interpretive and precise. He is depicting the pointed scholastic atmosphere of the Jewish rabbis studying the Talmud. One can see the heat of the debate on the faces and movements of the characters.

Schleicher died in Padua, Kingdom of Italy, in 1903.

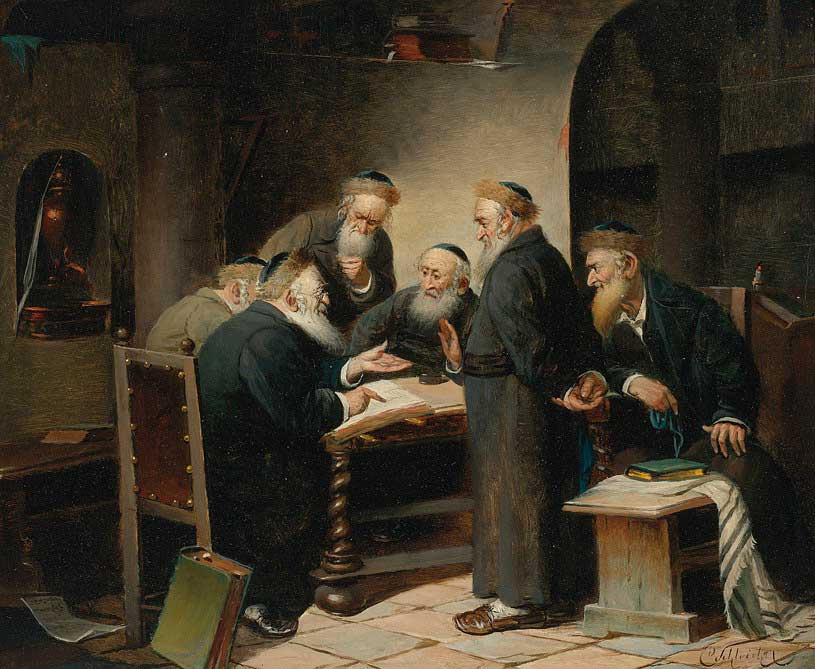
Carl Schleicher, A Question About the Talmud, oil on canvas, c. 1860–71. Private collection

=== Name ===
Although Schleicher was initially known in his hometown as Cölestin Schleicher, later he exhibited his work in Vienna and was acclaimed as Carl Schleicher, which is how he is mostly known since.

== Paintings ==
Disciple of the Austrian painter Ferdinand Georg Waldmüller, Schleicher developed his work in costumbrist style, mainly in Vienna between 1859 and 1871. On several occasions he exhibited his work at the Österreichisches Kunstverein (Austrian Arts Club). Showing familiarity with Jewish life, Schleicher exhibited genre paintings with Jewish scenes.

He specialized in oil painting and shows the influence of Dutch Golden Age painting of the 17th century.

Schleicher is particularly known for the anecdotal component of his work. He individually portrayed the different characteristic types of his time, some of them dedicated to reading or writing. Among these works, The Drinker, The Card Player and The Musician stand out. The Scribe involves a Benedictine monk with glasses, busy writing something that he inscribes with the help of a pen on several papers. Preserved in the Bury Art Museum in Manchester, Study of an Old Man presents an old man with a cigar and a beer jug.

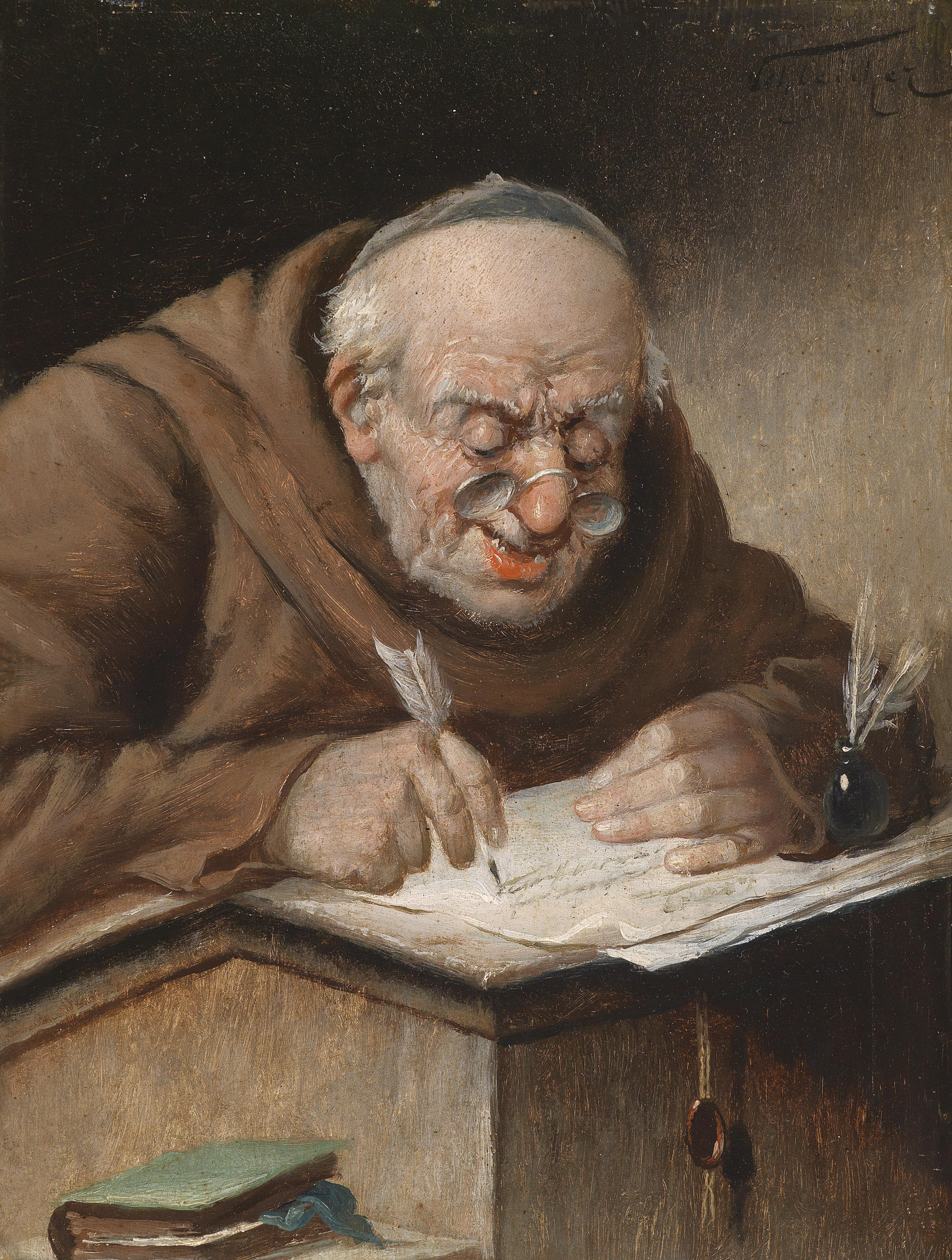
Monk writing

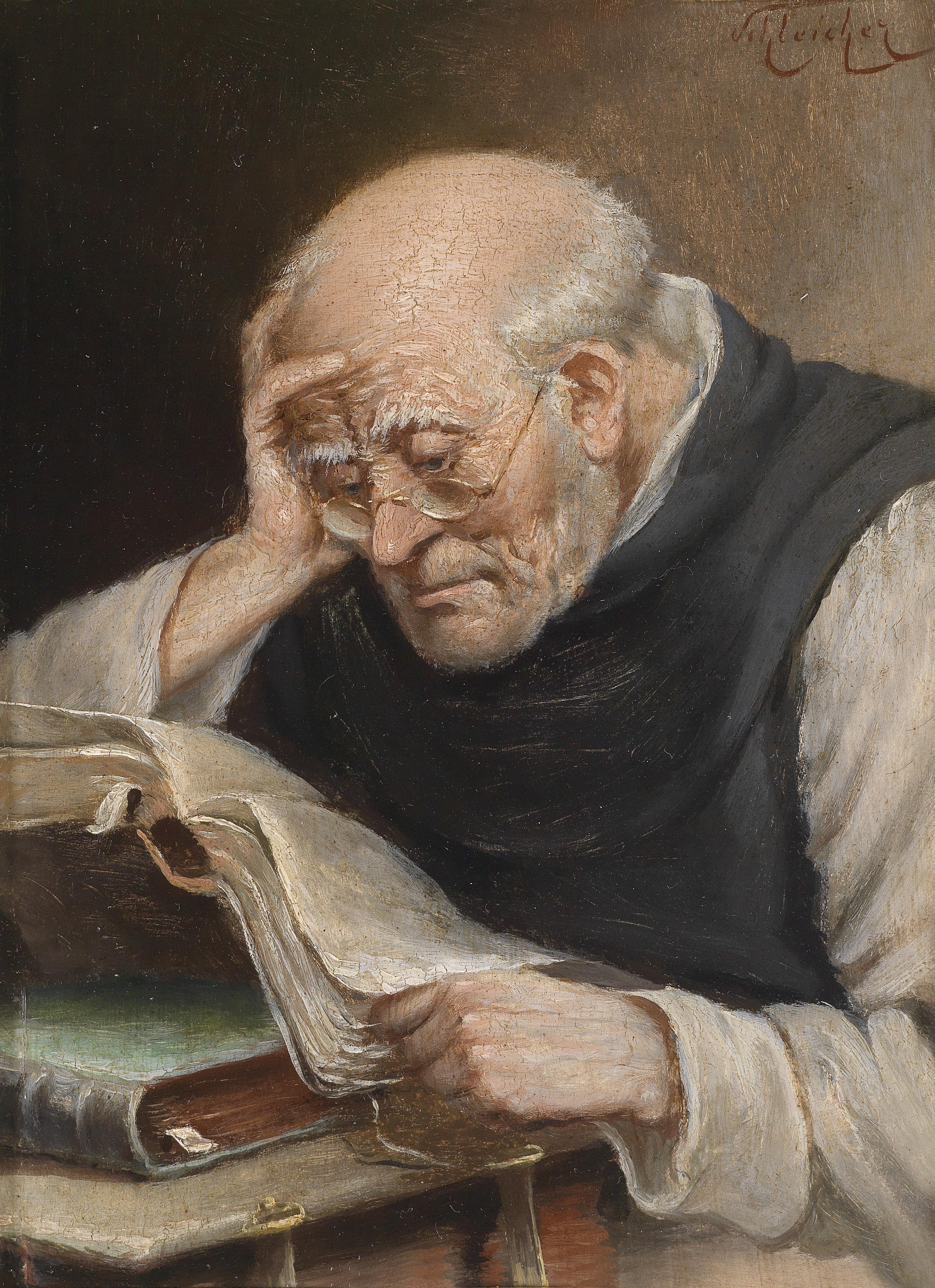
Monk reading

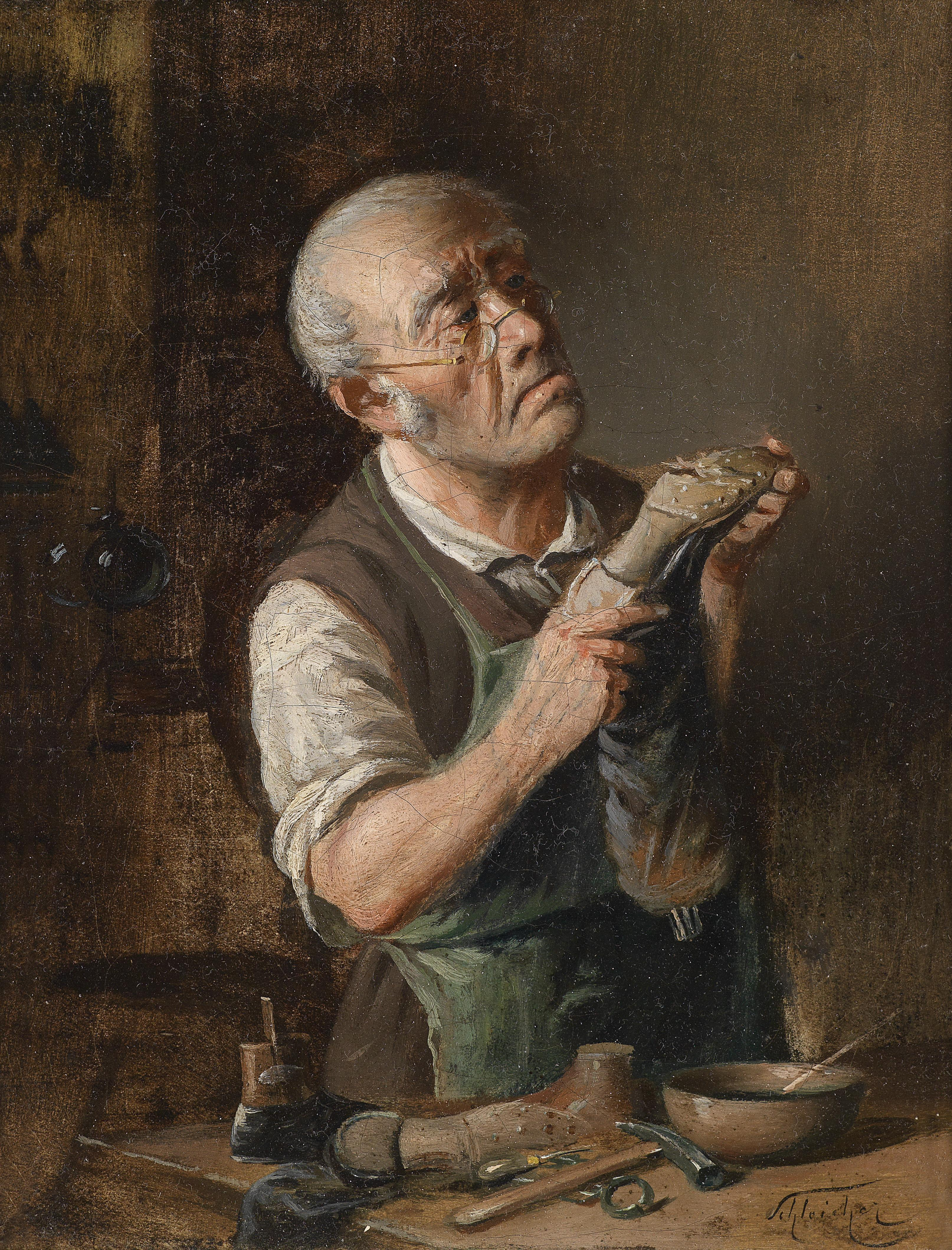
The Cobbler.

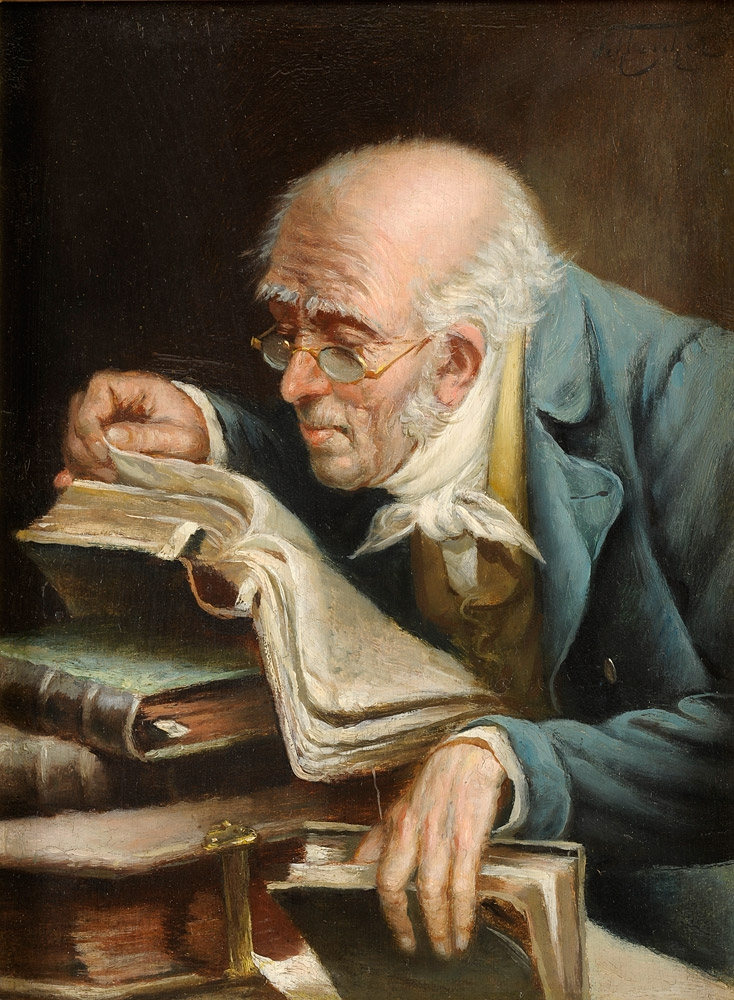
The Bookworm.

Some of Schleicher's paintings present genre scenes, such as Tavern Scene, Drinkers, In the tavern and The chess players.

Other works have a certain intimacy, notably La toilette and Grandma's birthday. The anecdotal nature of Schleicher's painting is in turn evident in works such as Thief in the artist's studio, Long live the wine, The broken container, A rare piece and The winning hand .

Schleicher also painted groups of priests and rabbis. The figure of the Christian priest is introduced individually in Old Man Writing a Diary and is taken up in group terms in The Chess Players, where a Benedictine monk measures himself against a Dominican one, while another, a Franciscan, observes the game between the two. As far as Judaism is concerned, Schleicher was particularly interested in rabbinic activity around the Talmud, thus creating works such as Rabbis in debate and A Talmudic dispute.

=== Paintings of rabbis and talmudists ===
A part of Carl Schleicher's output is closely related to Judaism and Ashkenazi life. The exchange of ideas and interpretations between the rabbis and talmudists was a topic to which Schleicher dedicated a considerable number of oil paintings. Loaded with anecdotal material, such paintings constitute a valuable record of the practices and customs of Ashkenazi Jews in Europe, whose culture and heritage are known as Yiddishkayt. Schleicher's record is valuable because most of Europe's Ashkenazi communities and their cultural diversity have been lost due to the Shoah.

The theme addressed by Schleicher concerns both the Jewish dialectical-exegetical experience and modern art. Schleicher's paintings are characterized by being not only descriptive, but also by sharply capturing the atmosphere of study that governed the life of the Talmudists: seriousness and dedication, with interesting dialogues and surprising ideas, but also problematic contradictions, endless arguments and humor.

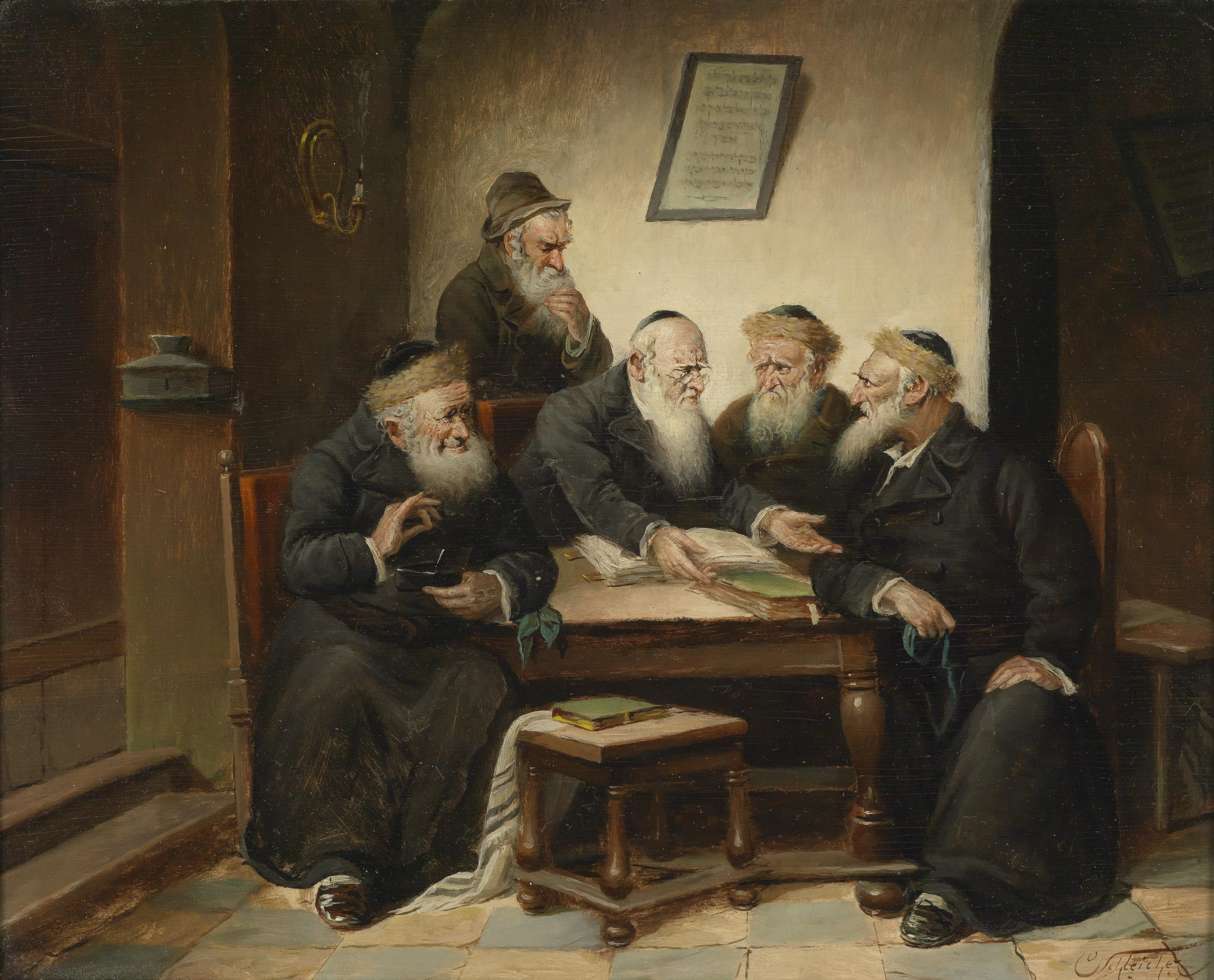
At the Rabbi's is a work that deals with the serious explanation given by an Ashkenazi leader about the Talmud.

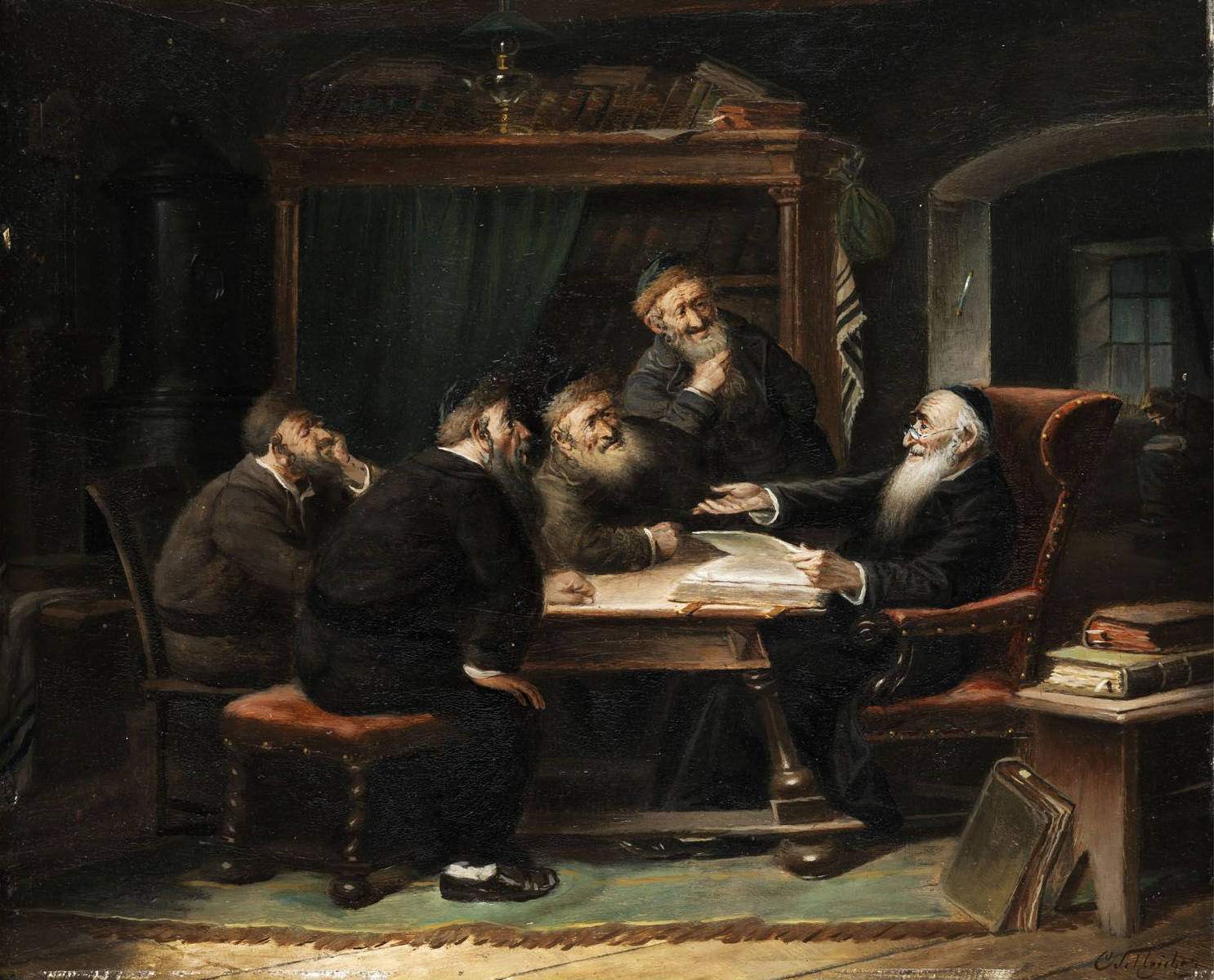
In Jewish Scene I, Schleicher presents an elderly rabbi giving his interpretation of a certain matter through a haggadah from the Talmud.

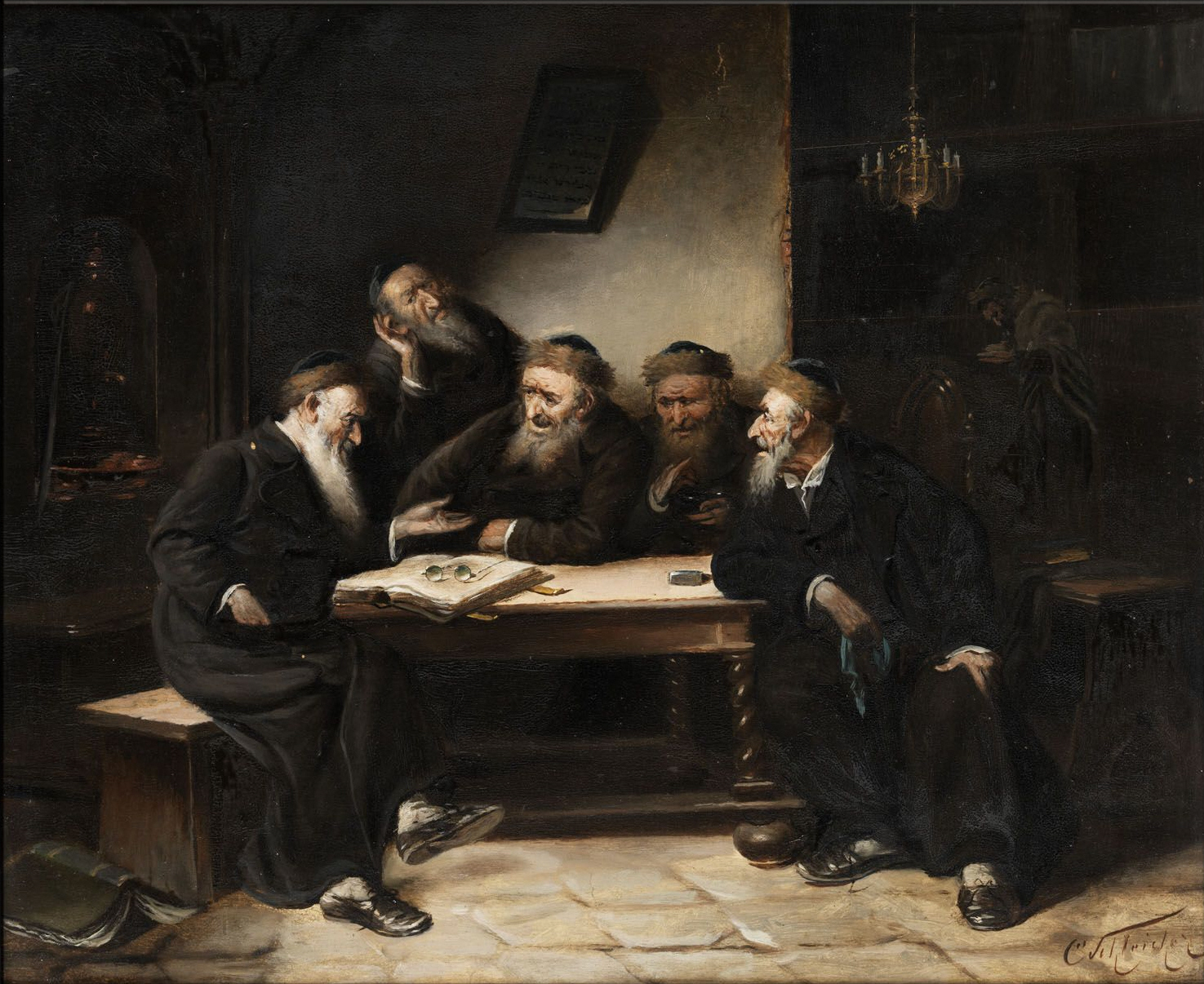
Jewish Scene II is a painting that shows Talmudists conversing about the meaning of a Talmudic passage.

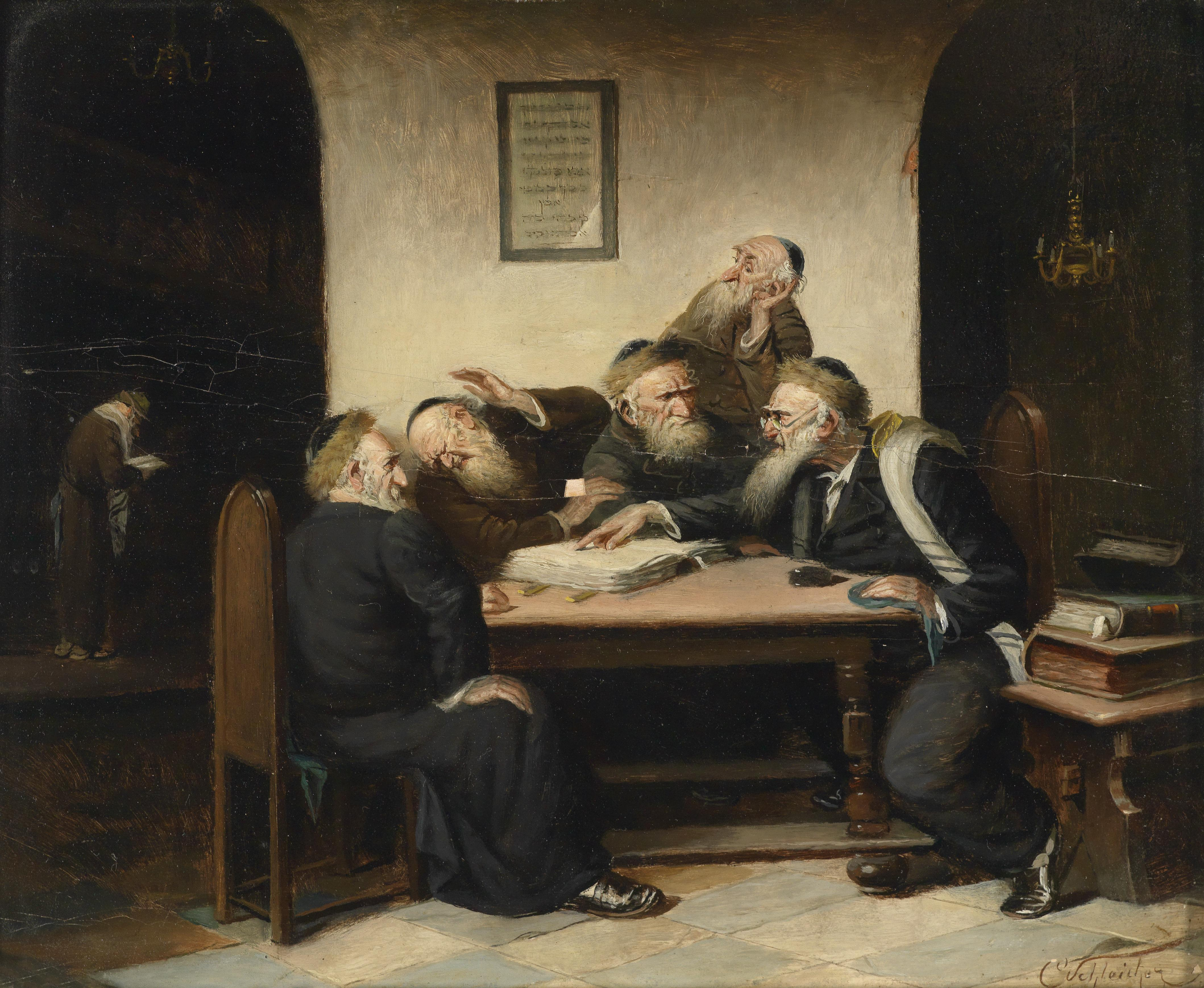
Dramatic effect in A controversy from the Talmud, where Schleicher has portrayed the different attitudes of the Talmudists: conviction and assertiveness, opposition and rejection, attention and amazement.
