= Judah Moscato =

Italian rabbi, poet and philosopher

Personal life
- Born: c. 1530 Osimo, Papal States
- Died: c. 1593 Mantua, Duchy of Mantua

Religious life
- Religion: Judaism

Judah Moscato (c. 1530 – c. 1593) was an Italian rabbi, poet, and philosopher of the sixteenth century; born at Osimo, near Ancona; died at Mantua. As harassment of Jews in the Pontifical States worsened under Paul IV from 1555, Judah went to the home of his kinsman Minzi Beretaro at Mantua, where he enjoyed the society and instruction of the foremost Jews of his time, the brothers Moses, David, and Judah Provençal and Azariah dei Rossi. In 1587 he became chief rabbi of Mantua. Moscato was a true child of the Renaissance, well versed in the classical languages and literatures and in sympathy with their spirit. Like many of his contemporaries, he believed that the ancient civilization and all the languages of culture were derived from Judaism and that it was the duty of the Jews to acquire these branches of knowledge, of which they had once been masters. He was widely read, especially in philosophy; and again like his contemporaries, although an admirer of Judah ha-Levi and Maimonides, he was an enthusiastic student of the Cabala.

Moscato published, under the title Nefuẓot Yehudah (Venice, 1588; Lemberg, 1859), fifty-two sermons, which inaugurated a new epoch in homiletic literature. Most of these were delivered in Hebrew or in Italian; and while they observe the rules of rhetoric they deal with their subjects naturally and without forced exegesis. His other printed work, Ḳol Yehuda (Venice, 1594), was the first commentary on the "Cuzari" of Judah ha-Levi. Since this fact would at once secure for it a wide circulation, the rabbis Cividali and Saraval of Mantua urged him to publish it. It appeared posthumously, and since then has always been printed together with the "Cuzari." Moscato wrote poetry also, especially elegies on the deaths of friends and scholars, including one on the death of Joseph Caro. Three of his elegies, on the death of Duchess Margherita of Savoy (d. 1574), have recently become known.

Here is an excerpt from Rabbi Moscato's book Kol Yehuda:

Should it not be believed that the great and awe-inspiring story which is the basis and essence of this book [The Kuzari by Yehuda HaLevi] is true and really happened? If that were not so, why would the author of the book lie? For he wrote in the beginning of his book: 'As it has been recorded and known from historical works.' He repeated that in the introduction to the second part of his book: 'This is what happened afterwards with regard to the Kuzari, as it is known in the books of Khazaria...'" (translation by Rabbi Gershom Barnard)

Moscato cites Ibn Rushd and Abraham Bibago arguing that the source of all knowledge and science was Solomon, and that Greek philosophy borrowed from the Jews.
