= Hayyim Abraham Israel =

Rabbi Hayyim Abraham Israel
- Title: מהר"א ישראל; Ma'ara Israel

Personal life
- Born: 1708
- Died: 10 June 1780 (aged 71–72)
- Buried: Ancona, Italy

Religious life
- Religion: Judaism

Rabbi Hayyim Abraham Israel (Hebrew: הרב חיים אברהם ישראל; also known as: Ma'ara Israel; Hebrew: מהר"א ישראל) was a judge, doctor, and the rabbi of the Jewish community in Ancona, Italy. He authored the books Emrot Tahorot (Hebrew: אמרות טהורות) and Beit Avraham (Hebrew: בית אברהם) on Arba'ah Turim and Beit Yosef.

== Biography ==
Hayyim was born in the year 1753–1754 in Jerusalem, and migrated to Rhodes in his youth when his father, Rabbi Moshe Israel, was appointed the chief rabbi of the community.

Hayyim married in the year 1732-1733 and went to Constantinople to print his father's book, Mashat Moshe. In the year 1753-1754 he was appointed rabbi in Candia Jewish community (today known as Heraklion). In the year 1751–1752, he went, like his brother Rabbi Eliyahu Israel, on a trip to Europe as a doctor, and when he returned he was appointed rabbi in Alexandria Jewish community, and in 1765–1766, he moved to serve as a rabbi in Livorno, until he was appointed rabbi of the city of Ancona.
