= Zechariah Dhahiri =

16th-century Yemenite Jewish paytan

Zechariah (Yaḥya) al-Ḍāhirī (Hebrew: זכריה אלצ'אהרי, pronounced [zăχarˈjɔ ˈdˤdˤaːhiri]; c. 1531 – 1608), often spelled Zechariah al-Dhahiri (Arabic: زكريا الضاهري) (16th century Yemen), was the son of Saʻīd (Saʻadia) al-Ḍāhirī, from Kawkaban, in the District of al-Mahwit, Yemen, a place north-west of Sanaa. He is recognized as one of the most gifted Yemenite Jewish poets and rabbinic scholars who left South Arabia in search of a better livelihood, travelling to the Zamorin-ruled Calicut and Cochin in the Indian subcontinent, Hormuz in Safavid Iran, Ottoman-ruled Basra and Irbil in Ottoman Iraq, Bursa and Istanbul in Ottoman Anatolia, Rome in Italy, Aleppo, Damascus, Safed, Tiberias, Sidon, Jerusalem, and Hebron in Ottoman Syria, and finally to the Egypt Eyalet in Egypt and the Adal Sultanate in Ethiopia, where he returned to Yemen by crossing the Red Sea and alighting at a port city near Mocha. He wrote extensively about his travels and experiences in these places, which he penned in a Hebrew-language rhymed prose narrative, eventually publishing them in a book which he called Sefer HaMusar (The Book of Moral Instruction), in circa 1580.

The book is one of the finest examples of Hebrew literary genius ever written in Yemen, its author making use of a poetic genre known as maqāma, a prosimetric literary genre of rhymed prose with intervals of poetry in which rhetorical extravagance is conspicuous, to describe his journeys. The vocalization of HaMusar gives insight unto scholars into Yemenite Hebrew pronunciation. Al-Ḍāhirī, who was very adept in Hebrew, admitted to having modeled his poetry – two-hundred and seventy-five of which poems are found in his HaMusar and his Sefer Haʻanaḳ – on the Taḥkemoni of Yehuda Alharizi, who, in turn, was influenced by the Arabic maqāmāt of al-Ḥarīrī of Basra. His vivid descriptions of Safed and of Joseph Karo’s yeshiva are of primary importance to historians, seeing that they are a first-hand account of these places, and the only extant account which describes this yeshiva. With his broad Jewish education and his exceptional skills in his use of the Hebrew language, Zechariah al-Ḍāhirī is an important source in the study of Jewish history in the Land of Israel during the Renaissance and of Jewish persecution in Yemen at that time.

== Early life and travels ==
Little is known of the author's early life, other than the fact that he was an Israelite, descended from the Tribe of Reuben. Al-Ḍāhirī spent at least ten years in his travels away from his native Yemen, where he had left behind a wife and children. He writes of himself that he married a second wife in Cochin (India), being a place of Jewish converts, whom he later divorced because of her old age and lack of upper-teeth. He then travelled to Persia where he took another wife in marriage, which wife bare him twin sons, Joshua and Caleb, but after one year, his young bride died. It was at this time that he decided to leave Persia, leaving his two sons with his brother-in-law, and, presumably, continuing with his travels until eventually he returned home to his family in Yemen. After a stint in Yemen where he and the Jewish community were imprisoned, he eventually returned to visit his sons in Persia, and found them doing well, although his brother-in-law had by that time died.

The author, while writing about his journeys and experiences, cleverly conceals his own identity while narrating his experiences, and describes the experiences of two men in their journey, the two chief protagonists of his travel narrative: Mordechai Haṣidonī and his old crony, Abner ben Ḥeleḳ the Yemenite, which men are, in fact, the author himself. Some scholars had originally thought that the book was largely fictional because of this anomaly. However, modern Israeli scholars now agree that the author was referring to himself in concealed terms (his alter ego), just as he says explicitly about himself in the Introduction to his book, HaMusar. The numerical value of these two names (in Hebrew) is equal to his own real name. This remarkable literary work interweaves folktales, animal fables, riddles, poems, epistles, and travel accounts with pious admonitions, religious polemics, messianic speculations, and philosophical disquisitions in a most engaging fashion. It is not uncommon for al-Ḍāhirī to repeat episodes of his travel narrative, or some important event which happened to the Jewish community of Yemen, in more than one of the book's forty-five chapters.

Perhaps the book's most important contribution to historians is in al-Ḍāhirī's description of the Jewish communities in Safed and in Tiberius, during the mid-16th century, as well as a description of Jewish persecution in Yemen during the same century, under the Zaydī imamate. Modern archaeologists are grateful to Zechariah al-Ḍāhirī and credit him with giving a precise description of the location of Tiberias in the 16th century, whose city's walls adjoined the Sea of Galilee. Al-Ḍāhirī's description of Tiberius during that period conforms with that of another writer, viz., that of Rabbi Hayyim ben Joseph Vital, who also described the city's walls. Al-Ḍāhirī is accredited with bringing the Shulchan Aruch to Yemen, as well as kabbalistic books, among other works, which he sold in Yemen at their face value. Other books, he recalls, had been lost at sea.

Upon Zechariah al-Ḍāhirī's return to Yemen in 1568, during the Turkish-Yemeni wars, al-Ḍāhirī was imprisoned in Sanaa, along with other principal persons of the Jewish community, for a period of one year in earnest by the lame theocratic ruler, al-Imām al-Mutahhar b. al-Mutawakkil Yaḥya Sharaf ad-Din, who allegedly suspected them of collaborating with the enemy. Al-Ḍāhirī, writing about this experience, says that he saw his own suffering as God's way of punishing him for his having left the Land of Israel and returning to Yemen. It was during this time that he began to write his momentous work, HaMusar – a record of his travel experiences, at the age of thirty-seven, although it was completed several decades later. Al-Ḍāhirī's travel accounts are styled after the maqāmāt of the famous Spanish schools of poetry, with a rhyming syllabary composed in metered verse, after an exquisite and flowering manner.

After the community's release from prison, the lame king still kept a firm grip upon his Jewish subjects, scattering them in different places throughout the country where they were kept under close-surveillance while working in the many towers built in that country. This close-surveillance continued unabated until the king's death in 1573. After the king's death, the Jews of Yemen were released from their incarceration by the succeeding ruler, who had borne a grudge against the former king and had destroyed his heirs to the throne. It was during this confinement to the towers (between 1569 and 1573) that Zechariah al-Ḍāhirī also completed another momentous work, which he composed mainly in the late hours of the night, viz., the book, Ṣeidah la’derekh (Victuals for the Road), being a commentary on the Pentateuch where he interweaves kabbalistic themes and philosophy drawn from the Zohar, Rabbi Saadia Gaon, Maimonides’ Guide for the Perplexed, Yosef Albo's Sefer Ha`iqarim and Rabbi Joseph ben Abraham Gikatilla’s Sha'are Orah. He mentions that during the period of this book's compilation, he and his family were not permitted to leave the tower except with prior consent of his overseers. It was at this time that al-Ḍāhirī made a vow to return to the Holy Land, after he had performed a pending vow. It is uncertain whether or not he ever made the return trip.

Al-Ḍāhirī mentions that the community was visited in 1595 – some twenty-seven years after their imprisonment had begun – by an emissary of the rabbis in the Land of Israel, Rabbi Avraham b. Yiṣḥaq Ashkenazi, who had been sent there with many books and with letters of recommendation to raise money for the poor in the Land of Israel. Al-Ḍāhirī, however, deemed it necessary to explain in a letter addressed to the said emissary that the Jewish people in Yemen were too poor themselves to render any assistance to their brothers in the Land of Israel. Scholars of comparative Arabic-Hebrew literature are quick to point out that these hardships facing the Jewish community in Yemen often gave rise to messianic aspirations in al-Ḍāhirī's rhymed prose.

== Spanish Jewry’s influence ==
Zechariah Ḍāhirī is said to have been instrumental in introducing elements of the Spanish prayer-rite into Yemen, as well as kabbalistic practices.

The early Spanish poets of the Golden Age, Moses ibn Ezra (b. circa 1060), Alḥarizi (1170–1235), Rabbi Abraham ibn Ezra (c. 1089–1167), Solomon ibn Gabirol (c. 1020–1058), Judah Halevi (died 1150), among others, had all left an indelible mark on Zechariah al-Ḍāhirī. Some of the greatest exponents of Jewish law had also come from Spain, namely, Maimonides and Alfasi. Other proponents of Jewish law from the Spanish Jewish exiles who were expelled from Spain began to make a name for themselves in the Land of Israel where they had come. Neither al-Ḍāhirī, nor the people of Yemen, were oblivious to this. Al-Ḍāhirī patterns his Sefer Ha`anaḳ (A treatise on Hebrew homonyms) after a work by a similar name written by Moses ibn Ezra. Al-Ḍāhirī's frequent mention of Sephardic prayer rites and customs in his Ṣeidah la’derekh leads one to conclude that al-Ḍāhirī was strongly influenced by the Spanish-rite Siddur (Sephardic Prayer Book), as he brings down portions of its layout in the biblical sections known as Parashat Ṣav and Breishit. So, too, the author shows the influence of kabbalistic practices on his writings, such as where he devotes several chapters to theosophical Kabbalah in his HaMusar, and where he brings down in his Ṣeidah la’derekh an esoteric teaching relating to the blowing of the ram's horn on New Year's Day and which practice is cited in the name of the illustrious Rabbi, Moses Cordovero. In another place, al-Ḍāhirī makes mention of the Sephardic practice where some will refrain from shaving their heads during the Counting of the Omer, while others prohibit the shaving of the head from the beginning of the counting until the thirty-third day of the Counting of the Omer. Here, incidentally, it is alluded that the Yemenite Jewish custom in this regard was different. Even so, al-Ḍāhirī levels harsh words of criticism against Spanish Jewry's lack of poetic style in their daily communications and belles lettres, which, by that time, had mostly been lost by them.

== Highlights from journey ==
Zechariah (Yaḥya) al-Ḍāhirī visited Rabbi Joseph Karo's yeshiva in Safed, in circa 1567 CE (the kabbalistic philosophies of which he describes in Maimonidean, neo-Platonic terms rather than purely mystical, theosophical, or sefirotic), writing of his impressions on this wise:

I journeyed from Syria, the province, through Upper Galilee, unto the city of Safed, the land of Canaan… I then came into the city, and lo! Within her dwelt the Divine Presence, for within her there is a large community, frowardness being removed far from them, about fourteen thousand in number! In eighteen seats of learning they had come to study the Talmud. There, I saw the light of the Law, and the Jews had light. They surpassed all other communities… Then it was that I knew my estimable worth, based on all my strength and ability, and lo! I had been deficient in several matters. Now, ‘that which is lacking cannot be numbered’ (Eccl. 1:15). I made myself inconspicuous in her midst, while feeling somewhat dejected on account of my inferior knowledge. Within the synagogues and midrashic study halls I had come to hear the expositors who expound upon a certain matter in several ways, seeing that they know every secret thing, from the walls of the ceiling, all the way down to its foundation – but, especially, the great luminary, even the wise man, Rabbi Joseph Karo, from whose seat of learning the wise men of Safed do not quit themselves, for in his heart the Talmud is stored, after he had sat down in learning for seven years, within a confined chamber. Now, aside from several branches of wisdom, within his heart are sealed, both, revelations and mysteries. I went one Sabbath to his seat of learning, to see his honourable and glorious magnanimity. I sat down by the entrance, alongside the doorpost of the gate, while my cogitations from foolishness were sorely gripped by fear. Now, that wise man the elder sat upon a chair, and with his mouth he did amplify the subject matter. By an utterance he would draw man away from his yoke caused by the vicissitudes of time, in drawing him nigh unto the faithful God. He would then clothe him, as it were, in sumptuous apparel fit for those who are free, by his recital of the verse: ‘The Law of the Lord is perfect, reviving the soul’ (Ps. 19:7). He then deliberated on a certain matter by explicating its plain and esoteric sense. Before him were seated about two-hundred very admirable and distinguished pupils, sitting upon benches. When he had finished his words of wisdom, he gestured to a certain disciple opposite him to speak… Now, when that wise man (i.e. Rabbi Joseph Karo) heard the words of that disciple, he was astonished by his eloquence of speech who had given plausible arguments about the soul, and he then raised him up and exalted him above all the pupils that were with him… I stayed there awhile, until the wise man (i.e. Rabbi Joseph Karo) had gestured to his pupils to stand up, and then gave order to each one to learn a Mishna. So they went their way, the pupils who were there gathered and the wise man (i.e. Rabbi Joseph Karo).

In Safed, al-Ḍāhirī also met-up with other great rabbis, such as Rabbi Moses Cordovero, the kabbalist, and Rabbi Moses di Trani.

Al-Ḍāhirī's description of the city of Tiberius is on this wise: “…Now, I quickly passed through that land of great drought, until I reached the far end of the Sea, known as Kinneret , and, lo! Tiberius was closed before me! And when I came into her streets and into the pathways of her palaces, I enquired of a young lad, ‘Where are they, the seven principal men of the city?’ He then said to me, ‘They are seated in the synagogue which is by the wall of the [city’s] fortified enclosure, upon the seaboard of the Kinneret, which lies to the east. I then went there in haste, to see whether it be fat or lean, and when I had arrived there I saw distinguished elders, the glory of the Jews; those well-versed in Scripture and in the Mishna, while others of them had knowledge of the Talmud and of sound reason; still others of them knowledgeable in theoretical Kabbalah, and those who know the proper usage of the language. Now, when I took sight of them, a recurring trepidation came over me, for I by their estimation was young of age, and being but a boorish man who had not yet acquired knowledge, while they were all wise. So I sat down toward the end of the familiar synagogue, keeping silent and wondering at what shall be.” The greatest scholar of Tiberius at that time was Rabbi Eliezer ben Yochai, “in whose generation he was of singular character.” Most had gone there from Spain, amongst whom he names as the community's leader, Rabbi Samuel Hacohen, along with Rabbi Yaakov Halevi, a certain Rabbi Avraham, Rabbi Moshe Gedaliah and Rabbi Avraham Gabriel. The Jewish community of Tiberius is said to have been supported around that time by a wealthy Jewish philanthropist from Istanbul, Doña Gracia Mendes of the House of Nasi (d. 1569), but at her death the community lost thereby all means of support and was compelled to ask for Jewish donations abroad.

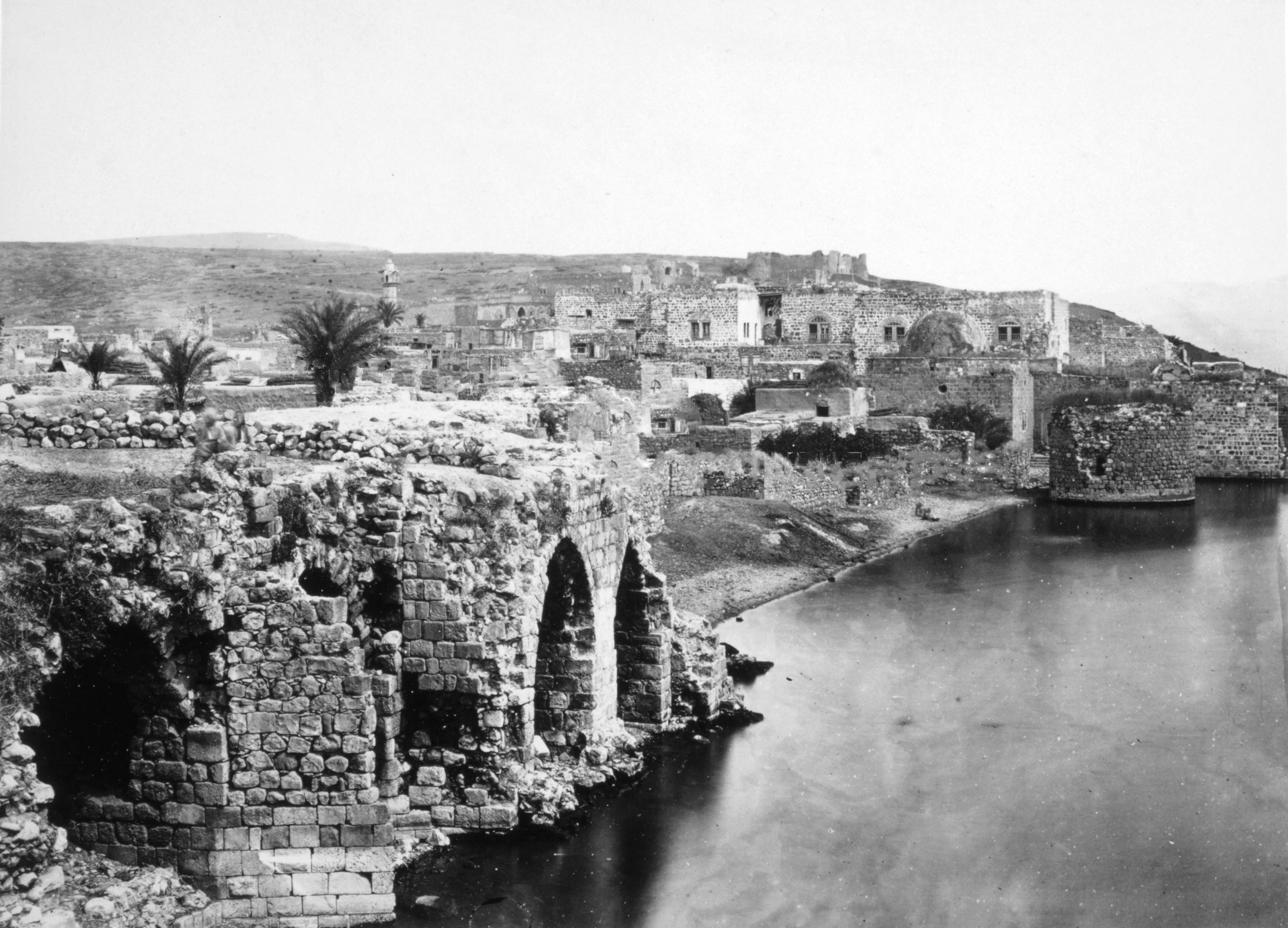
Photo of Tiberias in 1870, View from South-east

== Author's poetic style ==
There is to be noted in al-Ḍāhirī's style a marked transition from the early Spanish-type of poetry typical of Yemen prior to his time (depicted in the prosaic writings of Daniel berav Fayyūmī and Avraham b. Ḥalfon, both, of Yemenite Jewish provenance) and the later classical Yemenite poetic writings (as depicted in the liturgical poems composed by Yosef ben Israel and Shalom Shabazi). Unlike the latter who compiled works, both, in Hebrew and in Judeo-Arabic, al-Ḍāhirī's corpus of prosaic writings are written almost exclusively in Hebrew.

Much of al-Ḍāhirī's poetry was inspired by the great Spanish poets, while other works are said to have been inspired by Immanuel of Rome. Some of al-Ḍāhirī's poems are panegyrics influenced by the Arabic madiḥ, in praise of great Jewish scholars, such as Rabbeinu Yerucham (1290–1350), a Provençal rabbi who moved to Spain in 1306, following the expulsion of the Jews from France. Other panegyrics were written about Rabbi Obadiah di Bertinoro (c. 1445–1515) and Maimonides.

Sometimes the poet deviates from what is proper usage for a given noun, verb or adjective and changes the word's suffix in order to bring it into conformity with the rhyme. Most scholars agree that al-Ḍāhirī's greatest achievement is not just in his making use of rhymes, but rather in his ability to interweave biblical verse and rabbinic sayings taken from the Talmud and Midrash within those same strophes, which, by Jewish literary standards, is the true sign of genius.

== Literary works ==
- HaMusar (The author's travel itinerary; beginning of composition in 1568.)
- Ṣeidah la’derekh (Commentary on the Pentateuch)
- Sefer Ha`anaḳ (A treatise on Hebrew homonyms, written in 2148 verses)
- A Commentary on the Laws of Ritual Slaughter (being a commentary of Maimonides’ Hilkoth Sheḥiṭah – the Laws of Ritual Slaughter)
- Me’ah Ḳūloth (still in manuscript form) – a collection of one-hundred leniencies practised by the Jewish community of Sanaa with respect to the lungs of ritually slaughtered animals.
- Liturgical poetry (roughly, ten of which have survived): Includes such works as Ḳiryah Yafefiyah and Adonai mī yağīaʻ ʻad takhlīt ḥokhmathekha, and which are perhaps the most renowned of his liturgical poems.

== See also ==
- Yemenite Jewish poetry
