= Azariah dei Rossi =

Italian-Jewish physician, rabbi, and scholar (d. 1578)

- Born: c. 1511; Mantua, Margravate of Mantua, Holy Roman Empire
- Died: 1578 (aged 66–67); Mantua, Duchy of Mantua, Holy Roman Empire

Azariah ben Moses dei Rossi (Hebrew: עזריה מן האדומים) was an Italian-Jewish physician, rabbi, and scholar. He was born at Mantua in c. 1511; and died in 1578. He was descended from an old Jewish family which, according to tradition, was brought by Titus from Jerusalem. He was known among Jews as Azariah min-Ha'adumim (Azariah of the Red Family), a play on his name as well as a possible allusion to the fact that he lived in Catholic Italy, Rome being regarded as a spiritual heir of Esau (Edom, from Hebrew `-d-m, red). Combining an insatiable desire for learning with remarkable mental power, Dei Rossi early in life became exceptionally proficient in Hebrew, Latin, and Italian literature. He became known for his critical thinking and erudition. He studied simultaneously medicine, archeology, history, Greek and Roman antiquities, and Christian ecclesiastical history. When about the age of thirty, he married and settled for a time at Ferrara. Later he was found at Ancona, Bologna, Sabbioneta, and again at Ferrara. In 1570 a terrible earthquake visited the last-named city and caused the death of about 200 persons. The house in which Dei Rossi lived was partly destroyed; but it happened that at the moment he and his wife were in their daughter's room, which remained uninjured. During the disturbances consequent upon the earthquake, Dei Rossi lived in an outlying village, where he was thrown into association with a Christian scholar, who asked him if there existed a Hebrew translation of the Letter of Aristeas. Dei Rossi answered in the negative, but in twenty days he prepared the desired translation, which he entitled Hadrat Zekenim. His account of the earthquake, written shortly after, is entitled Kol Elohim; he regarded the earthquake as a visitation of God, and not merely as a natural phenomenon.

Dei Rossi referred to his hometown Mantua as a "happy city" as it was a safe haven or a creative mecca for Jews at the time.

== Me'or Enayim ==
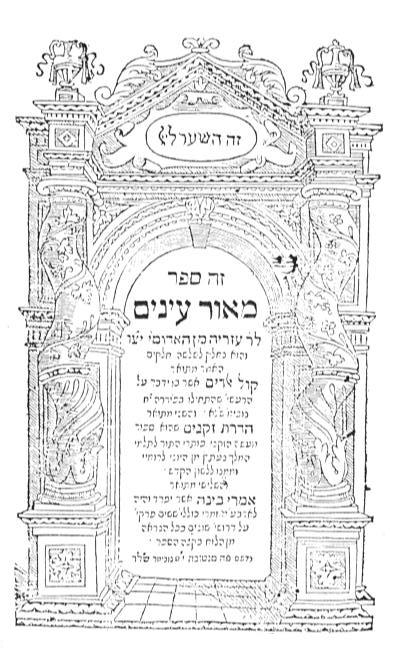
Meor Einayim

He is known chiefly for his book Me'or Enayim (English: Light of the Eyes) in which he used critical methods to test the literal truth of the Aggadah, the non-legalistic and narrative portions of the Talmud. His views were sharply criticised by Judah Loew ben Bezalel (the Maharal of Prague) in the latter's Be'er ha-Golah. Its publication sparked a vehement condemnation and controversy. It is a work of historical research. Joseph Caro demanded the book be burned.

Dei Rossi's great work, Me'or Enayim ("Light of the Eyes") (Mantua, 1573–75; Berlin, 1794; Vienna, 1829; Vilna, 1863–66), includes the two works already mentioned and a third entitled Imre Binah. The latter is divided into four parts; the first part contains a survey of the Jews at the time of the Second Temple, narrates the origin of the Septuagint, points out the contradictions between some of the beliefs of the Talmudists and the proved results of scientific research, records the origin of the Jewish colonies in Alexandria and Cyrene, chronicles the wars of Simon bar Kokhba against the Romans, etc. Dei Rossi quotes from the writings of Philo, whose orthodoxy he questions. He criticizes him for having allegorized Biblical narratives of facts, and points out that the Alexandrian philosopher never gives the traditional interpretation of the Biblical text. (However, he also offers a possible defence of Philo, and reserves a final judgment.)

In the second part, Dei Rossi criticizes a number of the assertions of the Talmudists (some of the criticisms were already extant and many of his criticisms were repeated by later commentators), and gives explanations of various aggadic passages which can not be taken literally (as, for instance, the aggadah which attributes the death of Titus to a gnat which entered his brain while he was returning to Rome). As such, Dei Rossi is characterized as a rejectionist, as he frequently rejected the literal historicity of rabbinic narratives, interpreting them instead as allegories or moral lessons. He argued that rabbinic texts could contain errors or reflect popular traditions rather than factual history. However, de Rossi also employed synthesis and accommodation in some cases, such as reconciling Talmudic accounts of the destruction of the Alexandrian Jewish community with historical records. His approach, while controversial, laid the groundwork for a more critical engagement with rabbinic literature, balancing respect for tradition with a commitment to historical accuracy.

The third part is devoted to a study of Jewish chronology and translations from the writings of Philo, Josephus, and others, with commentaries. His critique of Philo is novel and ahead of its time. The fourth part deals with Jewish archeology, describing the shapes of the priestly garments and the glory of the Second Temple, and giving the history of Queen Helen and her two sons.

== Attitude of his contemporaries ==
Dei Rossi followed the burgeoning scientific method of inquiry in his work and did not rely solely upon tradition. However, this approach towards subjects popularly held as sacred evinced significant criticism from his contemporaries. Prominent among his critics were Moses Provençal of Mantua (to whom Dei Rossi had submitted his work in manuscript), Isaac Finzi of Pesaro, and David Provençal, who endeavoured to defend Philo. Dei Rossi appended to some copies of the Me'or Enayim a response to the criticisms of Moses Provençal, and a dissertation entitled Tzedek Olamim, in which he refuted the arguments of Isaac Finzi. He later authored a work entitled Matzref la-Kesef (published by Hirsch Filipowski at Edinburgh, 1854, and included by Zunz in the Vilna edition of the "Me'or"), in which he defended his "Yeme 'Olam" against its critics. Dei Rossi, however, also had to contend with those who considered his "Me'or 'Enayim" a heretical work. Joseph Karo commissioned Elisha Gallico to draw up a decree to be distributed among all Jews, ordering that the "Me'or 'Enayim" be burned. However, Joseph Karo died before it was ready for him to sign, and so the decree was not promulgated. The rabbis of Mantua contented themselves with forbidding the reading of the work by Jews under twenty-five years of age.

The "Me'or 'Enayim" attracted the attention of many Christian Hebraists, who translated parts of it into Latin.

Dei Rossi was the author of a collection of poems (Venice, n.d.), among which are several of a liturgical character.

== Editions ==
- Azariah de Rossi, The Light of the Eyes Translated from the Hebrew with an introduction and annotations by Joanna Weinberg (New Haven, Yale UP, 2001), 864 pp. (Yale Judaica 31).
