= Jacob Castro =

Jacob Castro may refer to:

- Yaakov de Castro (1525–1610), rabbinic scholar and judge
- Jacob Castro (soccer) (born 1999), American soccer player
