= Yemenite Jewish poetry =

Yemenite Jewish prose and poetry

Yemenite Jewish poetry, often referred to as "paraliturgical poetry" because of its religious nature, has been an integral part of Yemenite Jewish culture since time immemorial. The Jews of Yemen have preserved a well-defined singing arrangement which not only includes the very poetic creation itself, but also involves a vocal and dance performance, accompanied in certain villages outside Sana'a by drumming on an empty tin-can (tanakeh) or a copper tray. The Jews of Yemen, maintaining strict adherence to Talmudic and Maimonidean halakha, observed the gezeirah which prohibited playing musical instruments, and "instead of developing the playing of musical instruments, they perfected singing and rhythm." (For the modern Yemenite-Israeli musical phenomenon see Yemenite Jewish music.) This arrangement was integrated into the walks of life familiar to the Jews of Yemen. The texts used in the arrangement were put down in writing and later included in separate song collections (dīwāns). The social strictures and norms in Yemenite Jewish culture provide for separate settings for men and for women, where the sexes are never mixed. Men's song usually expressed the national aspirations of the Jewish people, and it was far removed from the singing associated with the Muslim environment, whereas folk songs of Jewish women were sung by rote memory (unwritten poetry) and expressed the happiness and sorrows inherent in their daily life and was, as a rule, closer to that of Muslim women.

== Structure ==
In terms of the formal structure, men's songs during social gatherings among Yemenite Jews are of three genres: nashīd (introduction), shirah (poem) and hallel (praise). The nashīd is written in the form of a classical Arabic qaṣīda. All songs of praise are always preceded by a song of supplication and of entreaties, known in Arabic as a nashīd. The shirah (poem) is a Hebrew term denoting two known structures taken from Arabic poetry, namely, the muwashshaḥ (lit. "girdle poem," being the most common poetic form in Yemen) and the Andalusian zajal. In the muwashshaḥ, the first strophe of the poem sets up a specific rhyme, and each strophe that follows is composed of four verses, whose last rhymes with the original strophe. These poetic genres were strictly composed in Hebrew, or else with a mixture of the two languages (Hebrew and Judeo-Arabic), although, occasionally, it could be found solely in Judeo-Arabic. The vast majority of these compositions are contained in an anthology known as the Dīwān.

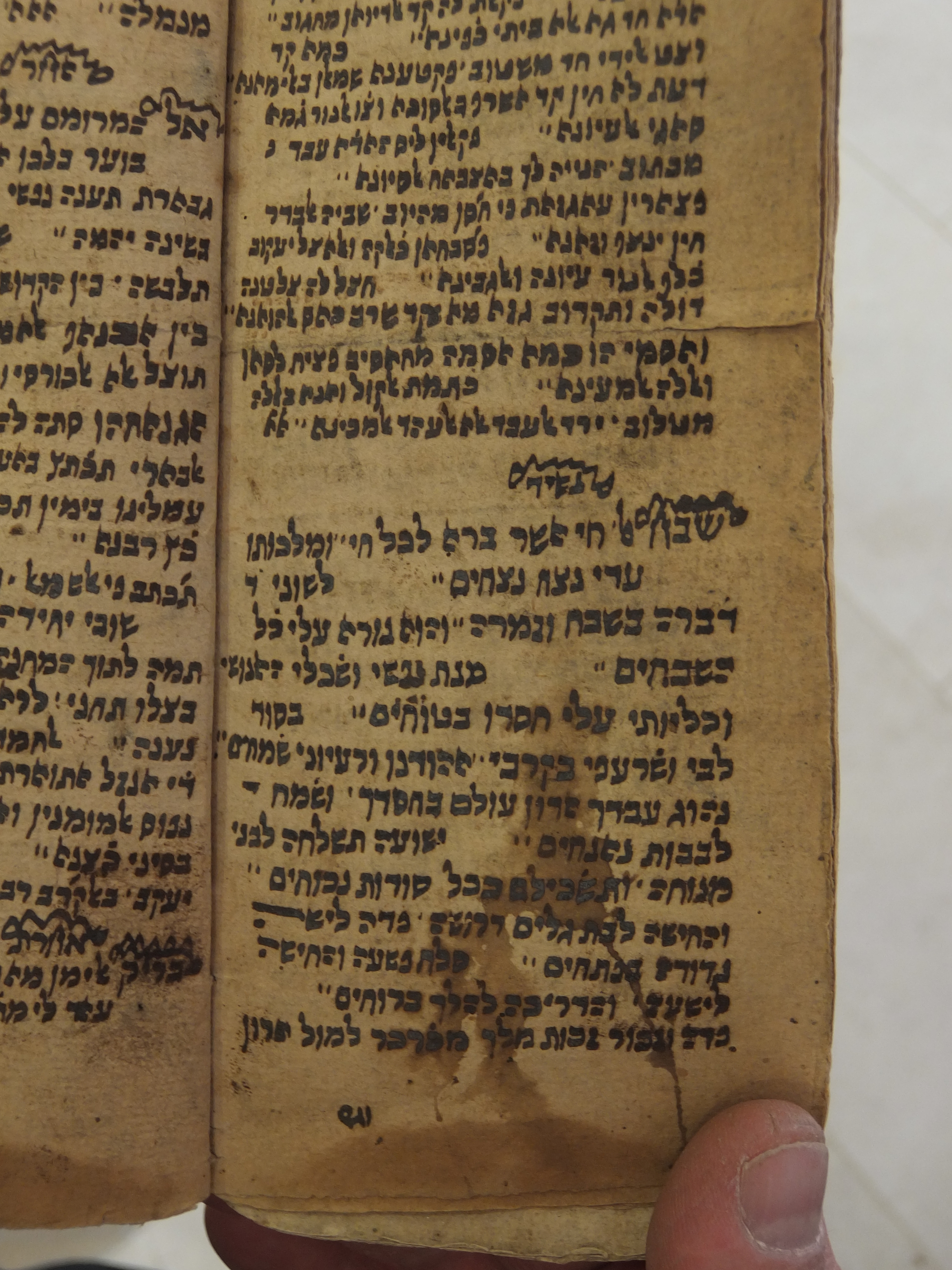
Anthology of para-liturgical poems ("Diwan")

=== The Nashīd ===
The nashīd is a song that, from the beginning to end, uses only one metre and one rhyme. It is sung by one or, at most, two members of a group, who are answered by the rest in attendance. The nashīd is a serious, often sad chant. Its content is religious rather than secular, the tone slow and monotonous, while the language employed is generally Hebrew.

=== The Shirah ===
The shirot constitute the chief and essential component of the singing performance. If the atmosphere is agreeable, several shirot (plural of shirah, or poems) are performed one after the other. "When the atmosphere becomes charged the singer switches the melody or changes the rhythm. The more switches there are the more successful the event and the more esteemed the singer."

In the dīwān, the structural layout of the shirah (poem), such as those performed at wedding celebrations, is the double muwaššaḥ, a structure that is characteristic of Muslim and Jewish poetry of Yemen, alike. The sense here is that the qufl, or simṭ (the lines which conclude the rhyme), is made-up of two parts: (a) three or four short lines, embodying a single rhyme which changes from one rhymed strophe to another; (b) two long lines whose rhyme is identical in all the strophes. In Yemenite Jewish tradition, these short lines are called tawšīḥ. The performance of the shirah (poem) at wedding celebrations by the professional meshorer (precentor) opens with a melodious tune; the ghuṣn lines (the first lines that open the rhyme in the first strophe) being by nature slow and full of yearning. When the precentor reaches the third line of the ghuṣn, the tempo becomes more charged. At this point another person joins the performance, not necessarily an experienced precentor, who sings the second part of each line, or repeats the short tawshīḥ lines.

=== The Hallel ===
The halleloth (plural for Hallel) are short songs of blessing that begin and conclude with the word Hallelujah. As far as musical intonation and performance is concerned, the hallel (praise) is considered the simplest of the three genres. One man of the party opens with the starting words of the hallel, while the entire party loudly and eagerly joins in with him in a monotonous staccato melody, and who audibly draws out the end of the textual and musical frames.

== Content ==
Yemenite poetry is often steeped in allegorical expressions drawn from the Kabbalah and esoteric writings. Although it might incorporate themes of wine and of love, or that of a bridegroom and bride, it is, nonetheless, distinctly set apart from songs of hedonism sung in revelry and in drinking bouts. In Yemenite poetry, such themes serve a mystical meaning, not to be understood in its literal context of a marriage between a man and a woman in the flesh, but of the bridegroom being the Holy One, and his bride, the people of Israel (Knesset Yisroel). The poem's principal content is the bride's supplication, meaning, Israel who was banished in exile from the groom's inheritance, from the holy city of Jerusalem, and also the incensed groom's (God's) ethical words of reproof and his longing for his bride. The arch-poet, Shalom Shabazi, many of whose poems make-up a large segment of the dīwān, has written a warning not to think of his poetry in sensual or secular terms, since all had been written as an allegory.

The nashīd (plural: nashwad) is quintessentially religious, usually an appeal to God. The shirah (poem) is the principal genre sung on different joyous occasions, especially weddings. It is a long song which incorporates different themes–primarily philosophy, praise, and supplication – and has a fixed opening structure in which God is praised, and an ending in which the party of men gathered on that joyous occasion are praised. Actually, on such occasions several shirot (songs) are sung one after the other.

Songs of redemption feature prominently in the Yemenite repertoire of para-liturgical poetry. One example is Sapari Tamo, two stanzas of which are as follows, and where birds are used allegorically for the gentile nations:

There is a tree bearing citrus fruit in my garden; עֵץ פְּרִי הָדָר בְּגַנִּי
My nectar is there, as also my wine. וַעֲסִיסִי שָׁם וְיֵינִי
Accept it out of my right hand, קַבְּלִי מִתּוֹךְ יְמִינִי
The mingled cup that I have chosen. כּוֹס אֲשֶׁר נִמזָג בְּחַר לִי
From Be’er Sheba (i.e. exile), quit yourself! מִבְּאֵר שֶׁבֶע צְאִי לָךְ
Forsake the screech owl and the cormorant! וּזנְחִי יַנשׁוּף וְשָׁלָךְ
Become wise and understanding in thine own [Law]! וַחכְּמִי בִּינִי בְּשַׁלָּךְ
From the right, turn not left! מִיּמִין אַל תִּשׂמְאִילִי

— "Sapari Tamo" by Saʻadiah ben ʻAmram

== Manner of performance ==
In Yemen (as also in Israel), the all-male social-gathering always takes place around set tables, on which a variety of dainties have been laid up, with beverages (never actually solid foodstuffs), and traditionally opens with a nashīd. The first to perform this is the most distinguished of the guests at the social-gathering, usually the rabbi, even if he were not a man with a pleasant voice, nor an expert in musical performance, seeing that the music of the nashīd is simple, similar to the music of liturgical poems (piyyutim) recited in the synagogues, expressing longing and emotion. After he commences with the nashīd, the performance passes to a more expert male singer in the congregation, known for his musical talents, who is called by the Hebrew word, meshorer (precentor; singer of poetry, usually one with a natural forte for singing).

The precentor sings the first hemistich of the stanza, while another person, or the entire congregation, answers after him in concert. Often, one part of the song is sung by the lead singer, while another part is answered in company. In almost every song, repetition of the line in a verse is used, something also alluded to in the Babylonian Talmud (Berakhoth 31a). The experienced meshorer (precentor) improvises the performance by changing the melody, but maintains the leisurely pace of the music. In the course of the performance, the meshorerim can be changed, and, occasionally, replaced by non-professional performers. The performance at the end of the song returns to the one who commenced it.

In the course of performing the nashīd or the shirah, absolute silence reigns, insofar as these songs are considered sacred.

=== Weddings ===
Wedding festivities are conducted in the presence of a large group of people and which require a higher level of singing performance. The opening is similar to that of Sabbath and holiday meals, but they soon move to the more essential part of the shirot, as noted, performed by the professional meshorer (precentor), accompanied by a rhythmic beating of a copper plate (ṣaḥn) and by dancing performed by well-mannered dancers. The melodies of the Sabbath and holiday meals are very similar to those related to prayers and liturgical poems and which are said in the synagogue, and belong to the ancient musical heritage of the Jewish people. According to some scholars who found in them a resemblance to the liturgical music of orthodox Christian churches in the Land of Israel, their origin belongs rather to the music of the Temple. In contrast, the melodies of the shirot (poems) in wedding celebrations and in the dances that accompany them are borrowed, without doubt, from the Muslim surrounding. The impact of Islamic poetry in Yemen over Jewish singing was already felt by Rabbi Yiḥya Qoraḥ, one of the more important Jewish sages in Ṣanʻā’ during the 19th century (1840–1881), who did not hesitate to go to singing parties of the Muslims in his city in order to thoroughly acquaint himself with the poetic requirement of the singing and its performance.

In Yemenite Jewish tradition, the melodies of shirot which are usually sung at weddings are ascribed unto Rabbi Shalom Shabazi, the most renowned poet of Yemenite Jewry who lived in the 17th century (ca. 1610–1680). However, it seems that this tradition merely reflects the fact that he was the poet who was most instrumental in planting the style of the school of Muslim Ḥumaynī poetry in Yemenite-Jewish poetry, although he was not the first Jewish poet who wrote in the Ḥumaynī style. It may be assumed that he not only took from Ḥumaynī poetry the parameters related to the folk register of the Arabic language and to the lenient approach in relation to metre and to its bold use of erotic imagery to describe the love of God, but also took the melodies by which Muslims had performed their singing. There is evidence that Jews occasionally sang erotic poems of Muslims–known as ash‘ār–a matter that provoked harsh criticism from the religious leadership of the Jewish community. It seems that, similar to the phenomenon that is well known in other Jewish communities, Shabazi–and presumably also other Jewish poets in Yemen–wrote poems of a religious and national Jewish content, while making use of these Muslim melodies. Yosef Tobi possesses a video dating back to the 1980s in which a young Muslim from Yemen is performing an Arabic song in the same melodious tune, and with full of yearning, as is found in the poem, Qiryah yafefiyah (O Beautiful City), an emotional song of yearning for Jerusalem by Rabbi Zechariah al-Ḍāhirī who lived in the 16th century.

== History ==
Yemenite Jewish poetry, as it has been known from the twelfth century unto the mid-fifteenth century, was primarily sacred poetry composed in either Hebrew or Aramaic, that is to say, liturgical poetry intended for prayer in the synagogue, or else para-liturgical poetry intended for social occasions resulting from the yearly events or a person's life cycle. Such poetry was composed under the influence of liturgical poetry, both Hebrew and Aramaic, in Babylonia, but even more so under the influence of Hebrew liturgical poetry in Spain (i.e. the early Spanish poets of the Golden Age, Moses ibn Ezra [b. circa 1060], Alḥarizi [1170–1235], Rabbi Abraham ibn Ezra [c. 1089–1167], Solomon ibn Gabirol [c. 1020–1058], Judah Halevi [died 1150], among others). Even secular poetry was written in Yemen to a limited extent, mostly panegyrics, impacted by secular Hebrew poetry in Spain. Although the source for some of the linguistic values, prosody, and content of Yemenite Jewish poetry for that period was taken from Arabic poetry, this wasn't the result of any direct contact between Jewish poets and Arab poetry, but rather came about through Hebrew poetry in Spain, whose composers were well-acquainted with Arabic poetry and influenced by it. Notwithstanding, Yemenite Jewish poetry, although influenced by Spanish poetry, still maintained a puristic linguistic approach, meaning, they made use of the most eloquent level of the Hebrew language, which is the level of biblical Hebrew.

Zechariah al-Ḍāhirī's (circa 1531 – d. 1608) poetic style displays a marked transition from the early Spanish-type of poetry typical of Yemen prior to his time (depicted in the prosaic writings of Daniel berav Fayyūmī and Avraham b. Ḥalfon, both, of Yemenite Jewish provenance) and the later classical Yemenite poetic writings (as depicted in the liturgical poems composed by Yosef ben Israel and Shalom Shabazi). Unlike the latter who compiled works, both, in Hebrew and in Judeo-Arabic, al-Ḍāhirī's corpus of prosaic writings are written almost exclusively in Hebrew. Much of al-Ḍāhirī's poetry was inspired by the great Spanish poets, while other works are said to have been inspired by Immanuel of Rome. Some of al-Ḍāhirī's poems are panegyrics influenced by the Arabic madiḥ, in praise of great Jewish scholars, such as Rabbeinu Yerucham (1290–1350), a Provençal rabbi who moved to Spain in 1306, following the expulsion of the Jews from France. Other panegyrics were written about Rabbi Obadiah di Bertinoro (c. 1445–1515) and Maimonides.

Various sources indicate that, beginning with the 12th century and continuing till the 15th century, Jews in Yemen were familiar with Arabic philosophical literature, mainly that of the Ismāʻīlīs, including Arabic poetry from their school of philosophers (Havazelet 1992). The first Arabic poems compiled by Yemenite Jews were not lyrical or emotional poems–whether personal expressions of emotion or those related to the entire nation–but rather a combination of poetic prosody and philosophical ideas. Meaning, their main purpose was to pass on to the community a philosophical, ethic-like religious message, even though they didn't have any role in the religious practice related to Yemenite Jews, whether in the synagogue or in the para-liturgical religious frameworks.

It was only at the end of the 16th century that the Arab contribution in Jewish poetry in Yemen began to surge. The start of this process was in the poetry of Yosef ben Israel (late 16th century – early 17th century). This process, however, reached its climax in the poetry of Shalom Shabazi (1619–1680+), nearly the half of which is written in Arabic (with Hebrew characters). This process, however, involved two other phenomena that are interrelated: (a) the subject matter of the poems written in Arabic was very diverse and incorporated in them virtually all the genres known to poetry, especially poems containing an epic nature; (b) the linguistic register which serves in a particular part of the poetry written by Shabazī distances itself from the classical Judeo-Arabic spoken in the Middle-Ages, and becomes more like a colloquial language.

These two phenomena characterize in a small measure the poetic work of Yosef ben Israel, who frequently wrote about philosophical issues, and, consequently, preserved the “purity” of the classical Arabic language and wasn't drawn after the colloquial tongue. Furthermore, in those liturgical poems whose nature is obviously epic, and apparently closer to folk literature, such as the poem entitled Asabbiḥ ilāh al-kull wa-aʻla bi-ṭāʻatoh (or: bi-ḥikmatoh), which brings down the story of Joseph and his brothers, the poet has preserved a high "classical" register of Judeo-Arabic and has distanced himself from the colloquial (Ḥafeṣ Ḥayyim, 1966, p. 215–219).

Under the influence of the Yemeni-Muslim Ḥumaynī poetry, Yosef ben Israel and Shabazī often wrote muwaššaḥāt of double structure, were lenient regarding the rigid rules of Arabic metre, and were not even deterred from using extreme erotic expressions in describing an allegorical lover – whether it happened to be the Messiah or God. This, some say, was also the result of their being influenced by the midrashic commentary on the Song of Songs and kabbalistic literature (Farrāj-Fallāh 2011). Such verse, however, never degenerated into the sensuous hazl genre. That is certainly the case with regard to the more “classical” genres – nashīd, shīrah, and hallel – which were in fact an integral part of the national-religious nature of the Yemenite Jewish community, an experience which was not very different from any other Jewish community in the diaspora. The Jews of Yemen have traditionally viewed Arab poetry with the selective approach of "rapprochement and rejection." Secular hedonistic poetry was mostly rejected by them, while adopting elements of praise as found in panegyrics and in other genres of Arab poetry.

=== The qaṣīd (poetic tale) ===
The qaṣīd (poetic tale; plural: qiṣwad), as used in Yemenite Jewish works, was written mostly in Judeo-Arabic. It is nearly always the fruit of a single poet, and while bearing precise rules of meter and rhyme, it is still artificial and cumbersome, only a few being able to learn it by heart, and remember it only for short periods of time. It is largely distinguished from the earlier canonical genres by its content, and as a result of which, also its designation. The use of the qaṣīd genre in Yemenite Jewish poetry was unknown prior to Yosef ben Israel and Shalom Shabazī. At large, the general category of the qiṣwad may be divided into four subgenres:

(a) Poems written about national or personal tragedies, such as the expulsion of the Jews of Yemen to Mawza in 1679 (Halevi 1999–2003, pp. 331–333); the severe famine and the deadly events in the year of 1836 (Tobi 1999).
(b) Debate poems between two interlocutors, whether they be people, objects, cities or concepts; for example, the debate between the coffee tree and the qāt tree, between the bachelor and the married man (Bacher 1909; Halevi 1999-2003, I, pp. 257–260), or between the capital city of Ṣanʻā’ and other cities in Yemen (Bacher 1909; Ben Ami 2013).
(c) Satirical poems by which the poet gives vent to the injustice committed unto him by some person or by some community, such as the poem about the stolen porcelain bottle of wine, or the story about the stolen robe.
(d) Humorous poems about certain events of non-importance, such as the perfume sprinkler (marašš) which was broken, or the poem about the rooster that was slaughtered and eaten, although not by its owner, and without his knowledge.

All these four subgenres of the qaṣīd are characterized by actual events and relevance; in other words, relating to the events of everyday life, and to the reality of life that could be felt in Yemen. As such, the language employed adapts itself to this character, and is written in the spoken (colloquial) Yemenite dialect. However, due to this debased and low characteristic, the qaṣīd was completely detached from the national-religious experience, and was never performed in the aforementioned social gatherings, except toward the end, after the distinguished guests, including rabbis, had abandoned the party. This is absolutely non-existent with respect to the “classical” genres of nashīd, shīrah and hallel that were performed with vocal music in para-liturgical social gatherings. It is worthy of noting that copyists were usually not willing to include the qiṣwad in their dīwāns.

=== Maaneh poetry (Responsive poetry) ===
This is a special literary genre that also found its way into Yemen, used in men's company, but almost exclusively in women's company during their social gatherings. The maaneh poem (responsive poem) is a term that defines the fact that the poem was composed by combining some of the verses borrowed from an older poem (usually by a different author), including in most cases the poem's meter, rhyme and tempo, and which lyrics were later improvised with new stanzas interspersed between the old. It is of singular importance to note that the corpus of maaneh poetry were usually drawn from older poems having the structure of a nashid, but none were drawn from older girdle poems. One of the most famous 'responsive poems' written in Yemen was Ḥus Elohai mimǝ‘onkha (Hebrew: חוס אלהי ממעונך), by the Yemenite poet Hisdai, and which he wrote based on the poem, Ya‘avor ‘Alai Rǝṣonkha (Hebrew: יעבור עלי רצונך), by Judah Halevi. It is highly probable that old melodies were preserved in this way, and which were once common to distant Jewish communities.

חוס אלהי ממעונך	ḥūs elohai mimǝʻonḫa	Take pity, my God, from your dwelling place
על חבצלת שרונך	ʻal ḥavaṣeleṯ šǝronḫa	Upon the lily of your valley, Sharon;
יעבור עלי רצונך	yaʻavor ʻalai rǝṣonḫa	May your favor come over me
כאשר עבר חרונך	ka’ašar ʻavar ḥaronḫa	When your wrath has gone away!
שגבני מזדוני	sağǝveinī mizǝḏonī	Deliver me from my wanton sins,
כי לך לבי ועיני	kī lǝḫa libī weʻeinī	For my heart and eye are turned unto you.
הלעולמים עוני	halǝʻolamīm ʻawonī	Will mine iniquities forever
יעמוד ביני ובינך	yaʻamoḏ beinī u'veinḫa	Stand between me and you?

== Selections ==
The following nashid was composed by the arch-poet, Shalom Shabazi, and bears the author's kunya (cognomen) in acrostics; the first letter of each strophe spelling out the name, Abu Shimon Al-Shabazi. In Yemenite Jewish poetry, acrostics were often used as a signature device. The rhyme, needless to say, has been lost in the translation, but can be seen in its original.

אִם תַּחְפְּצָה בֶּן אִישׁ לְסוֹדוֹת נִבְחֲרוּ, תִּקְנֶה לְךָ חָבֵר וְרֵעִים יָקְרוּ
בַּעֲבוּר יְחִי לִבָּךְ וְתִשְׂמַח נַפְשְׁךָ, שֵׂכֶל וְהַנֶּפֶשׁ בְּטוֹב יִתְחַבְּרוּ
וּלְבַשׁ עֲנָוָה מִיְּמֵי בַּחְרוּתְךָ, וּמְאַס עֲצַת רֵיקִים אֲשֶׁר יִתְיָהֲרוּ

If you should desire, O son of man, the choicest of all secrets, you will find that nothing surpasses that of your gaining a companion, and your endearing unto yourself friends;
Such an accomplishment brings with it a quickening of heart, and gives you a real cause for rejoicing within the soul; A sound mind and the elevation of one's inner-self will, on its account, be indelibly bound together for good.
Moreover, put on the fine attire of humility, even from the earliest days of your youth, and reject the counsel of vain persons who have vaunted themselves;

שֵׁם טוֹב לְךָ יֵצֵא וְתַשִּׂיג חֶפְצְךָ, חַפֵּשׂ בְּמַסֶּכְתּוֹת גְּאוֹנִים חִבְּרוּ
מִשְׁנַת חֲכָמִים מֵאֲבוֹתָם קִבְּלוּ, יוֹם סָבְבוּ סִינַי בְּשִׂכְלָם נָהֲרוּ
עָלָה אֲבִי כָל הַנְּבִיאִים עַד מְרוֹם, אֶל הָעֲרָפֶל פְּעָמָיו מִהֲרוּ
וְגַלְגַּל וְאַדְרִיכַל מְלַוִּים לוֹ בְּחֵן, עָלָה וּפָתַח כָּל שְׁעָרִים נִסְגְּרוּ
נוֹכַח פְּנֵי סִינַי שְׁבָטַי נִקְהֲלוּ, גַּם מַלְאֲכֵי מַעְלָה, דְּגָלִים עָבְרוּ

A good name will then be reputed unto you, and you shall also obtain your desire. Search, therefore, in the treatises compiled by the geonim;
[In] the oral recital of the Sages, which they received from their forefathers, on that very day when they did go about Sinai, and their minds were perfectly enlightened;
The father of all prophets went up on high, even into the dark cloud, whence he did hasten his footsteps;
And whence a host of heavenly angels did favourably escort him. Whereupon he went up, and opened all the gates that were closed.
Before the face of Sinai, my tribes were gathered together; also the heavenly angels passed over the banners.

אֵשׁ יָרְדָה, מֵהַשְּׁכִינָה סָחֲרָה. קוֹלוֹת וּבְרָקִים וְעָנָן נֶחְבְּרוּ
לוּחוֹת שְׁנַיִם הֵם, בְּיוֹשֶׁר נִכְתְּבוּ. בָּם דִּבְּרוֹת עֶשֶׂר בְּעֵדוּת נֶחְקְרוּ
שָׁמְעוּ לְאָנֹכִי וְלֹא יִהְיֶה לְךָ, מִפִּי גְבוּרָה הֵם וְתוֹרָה שָׁמְרוּ
בָּרוּךְ אֲשֶׁר זִכָּה עֲדָתוֹ לַחֲזוֹת. תּוֹרָה תְּמִימָה בָּהּ, נְפָשׁוֹת כָּשְׁרוּ
זָכְרָה אֲדוֹן הַכֹּל לְחֵן תּוֹרָתְךָ. קַבֵּץ פְּזוּרֵנוּ, אֲשֶׁר נִתְפַּזְּרוּ
יַשֵּׁר דְּרָכֵנוּ, לְמַעַן חַסְדְּךָ, כִּי עַל יְרֵאֶיךָ חֲסָדִים גָּבְרוּ

Fire came down, from the Divine Presence it went around; thunder and lightning, and a cloud were conjoined.
The tablets are two; they have been written in equity. In them are Ten Commandments; for a testimony they have become the subject of [our] inquiry.
They heard, 'I am [the Lord your God],' and 'You shall not have [any other god before Me]'; from the mouth of the Omnipotent they [issued forth], while they have kept the Torah.
Blessed is He who has merited his congregation to see futurities; whom by the perfect Law has made souls worthy.
Remember, O Lord of all things, the beauty of your Torah; Gather in those of us who are scattered, who have been dispersed.
Make straight our path, for the sake of your loving-kindness; For on account of those who fear you, acts of kindness have prevailed.

— Shalom Shabazi, Diwan

In the first two stanzas of the following nashid, Rabbi Shalom Shabazi makes known his longing for the Divine Presence in the land of Israel:

The love of Hadassah (i.e. the Divine Presence) is bound upon my heart,
But I am in the midst of exile; my feet sinking in the depths below.
Had I been given leave, I'd go up and join myself [unto her],
Even in the very midst of the gates of Zion which are famous!

(original)
אַהֲבַת הֲדַסָּה עַל לְבָבִי נִקְשְׁרָה
וַאְנִי בְּתוֹךְ גּוֹלָה פְּעָמַי צוֹלְלִים
לוּ יֵשׁ רְשׁוּת לִי אֶעֱלֶה אֶתְחַבְּרָה
תּוֹךְ שַׁעֲרֵי צִיּוֹן אֲשֶׁר הֵם נֶהְלְלִים

— Shalom Shabazi, Diwan

== See also ==
- Biblical poetry
- History of music in the biblical period
- Yemenite Hebrew

== Bibliography ==
- ‘Amrī, Muḥammad b. ‘Abd Allah al- (2001). Ḥusayn b. ‘Abd Allah al-‘Amrī (ed.). Min al-Adab al-Yamanī (an-Nat̲r wa-'l-ḥumainī) (in Arabic). Damascus: Dār al-Fikr. OCLC 254843397.
- Ben Ami, Na‘ama (2013). "Qālat Ta'izz al-'Udayna: Translation and Analysis". Afikim (in Hebrew). 138 (9): 69–75.
- Bacher, W. (1909), "Zur Rangstreit-Literatur: Aus der arabischen Poesie der Juden Jemens", Mélanges Hartwig Derenbourg (in French and German), Ernest Leroux, pp. 131–147, OCLC 716655352
- Carmi, T., ed. (1981), Hebrew Verse, New York: Penguin Books, ISBN 0-670-36507-6
- Dafari, J.A. (Ǧa‘far ‘Abduh) (1966). Ḥumaini Poetry in South Arabia (Ph.D. unpublished dissertation). London: School of Oriental and African Studies.
- Daum, W., ed. (1987), "The Jews of Yemen", Yemen - 3000 Years of Art and Civilisation in Arabia Felix, Frankfurt/Main, ISBN 3701622922
- Idelsohn, A.Z. (1930). H. Torczyner (ed.). Diwan of Hebrew and Arabic Poetry of the Yemenite Jews (in Hebrew). Cincinnati: Hebrew Union College Press. OCLC 776779977. (reprinted in Tel-Aviv 1931)
- Dhahiri, Z. (1965). Yehuda Ratzaby (ed.). Sefer Ha-Mūsar (in Hebrew). Jerusalem: Ben-Zvi Institute. OCLC 568922278.
- Dhahiri, Z. (2008). Mordechai Yitzhari (ed.). Sefer Ha-Mūsar (in Hebrew). Benei-Barak: Nosaḥ Teman--Śagiv Maḥfud. OCLC 275980068.
- Farrāj-Fallāḥ, Janān (2001), "The Physical Depictions of the Messiah in the Jewish-Yemeni Poetry Compared to the Physical Depictions in the Panegyrics Poetry on Muḥammad", in Ayelet Oettinger; Danny Bar-Maoz (eds.), Mittuv Yosef: Yosef Tobi Jubilee Volume (in Hebrew), vol. 3, Haifa: University of Haifa, pp. 182–197, OCLC 745394469
- Gamlieli, Nissim Binyamin (2018), "Yemenite-Jewish Folksong and Poetry", in Rachel Yedid; Danny Bar-Maoz (eds.), Ascending the Palm Tree: An Anthology of the Yemenite Jewish Heritage, Rehovot: E'ele BeTamar, OCLC 1041776317
- Ḥabšī, ‘Abd Allāh Muḥammad (1986). Al-Adab al-yamanī: 'aṣr xurūğ al-atrāk al-awwal min al-yaman, 1045–1289 (in Arabic). Beirut: al-Dār al-Yamaniyyah.
- Ḥafeṣ Ḥayyim (1966). The Poems of R. Shalem Šabazī and Other Poets of Yemen (in Hebrew). Jerusalem: Muqayṭon Brothers. OCLC 647792841.
- Halevi, Raṣon (1999–2003). The Poetry of Israel in Yemen (שירת ישראל בתימן) (in Hebrew). Vol. 1–3. Kiryat-Ono: Makhon Mishnath ha-Rambam. OCLC 741097772.
- Iraqi ha-Cohen, Yosef, ed. (1999), Dīwān Eftaḥa Shīr (in Hebrew), Benei Barak: Mosdot be-netivot Emet, OCLC 145508358
- Maimonides (1989). Jehoshua Blau (ed.). R. Moses b. Maimon Responsa (in Hebrew). Vol. 2. Jerusalem: Meḳitse nirdamim / Rubin Mass Ltd. p. 399 (responsum # 224). OCLC 78411726.
- Maswari-Caspi, Mishael (1973). "Popular Language and Rhyme in Yemenite Poetry". Hebrew Abstracts. 14. National Association of Professors of Hebrew (NAPH): 87–89. JSTOR 27908057.
- Maswari-Caspi, Mishael (1974). "The Jawab Poetry (Shire Ma'ane) in Jewish Yemenite Poetry". Hebrew Abstracts. 15 (the David Rudavsky Issue). National Association of Professors of Hebrew (NAPH): 72–76. JSTOR 27908092.
- Maswari-Caspi, Mishael (1980). "Saʿadya ben Abrahan al-Bashīrī: A Seventeenth Century Northern Yemenite Poet". Hebrew Union College Annual. 51: 173–198. JSTOR 23507685.
- Qafih, Y. (1976), "What is the Eating of 'Ja'leh'? (אכילת 'ג'עלה' מה היא)", in Yosef Tobi (ed.), Legacy of the Jews of Yemen: Studies and Researches (מורשת יהודי תימן: עיונים ומחקרים) (in Hebrew), Jerusalem
- Qafih, Y. (1989). Yosef Tobi (ed.). Rabbi Yosef Qafih - Collected Papers (in Hebrew). Vol. 2. Jerusalem: E'ele BeTamar. OCLC 61623627.
- Ratzaby, Yehuda [in Hebrew] (1995). Yemenite Jewish Literature: Authors and their Writings (תורתן שלּבנֵי תימן) (in Hebrew). Kiryat Ono: Makhon Mishnath ha-Rambam. OCLC 180442344.
- Sassoon, D.S. (1932). Ohel Dawid - Descriptive Catalogue of the Hebrew and Samaritan Manuscripts in the Sassoon Library. Vol. 1–2. London: Oxford University Press. OCLC 912964204.
- Tobi, Yosef [in Hebrew] (1999). The Jews of Yemen: Studies in Their History and Culture. Leiden-Boston-Köln: EJ Brill. OCLC 906777608.
- Tobi, Yosef [in Hebrew] (2014). "Politics and Poetry in the works of Shalom Shabazī". Israel Affairs. 20 (2). Routledge: 240–255. doi:10.1080/13537121.2014.889893. S2CID 154704054.
- Tobi, Yosef [in Hebrew] (2015). The Satirical Qaṣīd about "The Poor Rooster who Died before It Could Be Purified": The Yemeni Ḥumaynī Poetry and Shalom Shabazīʼs Judeo-Arabic Poetry (17th Century). Jerusalem.
- Wagner, Mark S. (2009). Like Joseph in Beauty: Yemeni Vernacular Poetry and Arab-Jewish Symbiosis. Vol. 33 (Brill studies in Middle Eastern Literature). Leiden-Boston: EJ Brill. OCLC 906777608.

== Sources ==
- Havazelet, Meir. 1992. Cultural communications between Jewish and Moslem scholars in the late Middle Ages, as preserved in Yemenite Midrashim. Link-Salinger, Ruth (ed.), Torah and Wisdom; Studies in Jewish Philosophy, Kabbalah and Halacha: Essays in Honor of Arthur Hyman, New York, Shengold, p. 87–93.
