= Rabbenu Yerucham =

French rabbi (1290–1350)

Yerucham ben Meshullam (Hebrew: ירוחם בן משולם, 1290–1350), often called Rabbenu Yerucham (Hebrew: רבנו ירוחם), was a prominent rabbi and posek during the period of the Rishonim.

== Biography ==
Yerucham was born in Provence, France. Initially he lived in Languedoc. In 1306, after the Jewish expulsion from France, he moved to Toledo, Spain. During this time of his life, he became a student of Rabbi Asher ben Jehiel.

In the year 1330, he began writing his work Sefer Maysharim, which deals with civil law. He completed this work in four years.

At the end of his life, he wrote Sefer Toldos Adam V'Chava. This work is divided into two parts. The first is entitled "Adam", and covers the laws that apply before marriage, such as laws of circumcision, instruction, prayer, and Shabbat. The second part, entitled "Havah", deals with the laws that become obligatory at and after marriage, such as those connected with betrothal, marriage, etc.

Many of his rulings were codified in the Shulchan Aruch. He greatly influenced Rabbi Yosef Karo. He is quoted extensively by Rav Karo in both the Shulchan Aruch and Beit Yosef (Tur Choshen Mishpat 29:3 for a 'small' example of the latter).

== His Works ==
Rabbeinu Yerucham authored two books. The first is Sefer Meisharim, which deals with monetary law, and the second is Sefer Toledot Adam ve-Chavah, concerning practical laws observed in his time. This approach of dealing only with laws applicable in exile was widespread and accepted, and is especially associated with the Rif. The work is divided into Toledot Adam, which addresses various laws relating to a person from birth until marriage, as well as the laws of blessings, prayer, and customs, and is divided into twenty-one sections (netivim); and Chavah, which covers laws from the time of a man’s marriage until the day of his death (sections 22–28).

Although his books are widely circulated, their individual titles never became firmly established, and they are commonly referred to collectively by the name of their author, Rabbeinu Yerucham.

From his writings, we know that he also authored “Hints to the Aggadot” (Remazim shel ha-Aggadot), and that he was involved in collecting and interpreting the aggadic passages of the Talmud.

The work appeared in several editions (Constantinople, 1516; Kapust, 1808), but the most widely used edition is the Venice 1553 printing, which was subsequently reproduced in additional facsimile editions. A commentary on the work, entitled Shenot Chayim (Years of Life), by Rabbi Reuven Chaim Klein, was also published in Lemberg in 1871. This commentary was later reissued in facsimile form by Machon Yerushalayim in 1985.

In addition, Rabbeinu Yerucham’s works have long been regarded as containing numerous textual corruptions and omissions. These issues contributed to a relative decline in the number of scholars studying his books. In recent years, renewed efforts have been made to publish his works with commentary and based on various manuscripts. In 1997, the Torah journal Moriah published part of Sefer Meisharim together with a proposal for a new annotated and revised edition, though apparently that project was never brought to completion. However, in 2007, the Yair Nativ Institute published the first volume of a new edition of the work, entitled Rabbeinu Yerucham HaShalem, which was completed with its fifth volume in 2016. These volumes contain the entirety of Sefer Meisharim and Sefer Adam ve-Chavah, accompanied by explanations, annotations, and readings based on various manuscripts. Portions of this edition were also published in the Torah journal Moriah.

For many years, it was customary to attribute the authorship of Sefer Issur ve-Heter (“The Book of Prohibition and Permission”) to Rabbeinu Yerucham, although some maintain that the work was actually written by a student of Rabbeinu Peretz.
