= Maggid Mesharim =

1646 book by Rabbi Joseph Karo

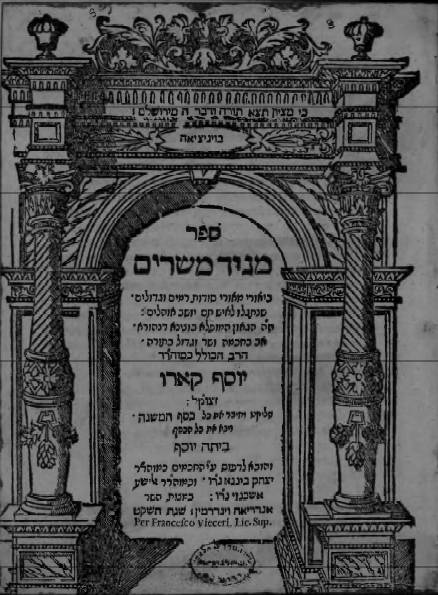
- Title page of the first edition
- Author: Joseph Karo
- Subject: Kabbalah

The Maggid Mesharim (Hebrew: מגיד מישרים, "Preacher of Righteousness"), published in 1646, is a mystical diary, in which Joseph Karo during a period of fifty years recorded the nocturnal visits of the Maggid - an angelic being, his heavenly mentor, the personified Mishna (the authoritative collection of Jewish Oral Law). His visitor spurred him to acts of righteousness and even asceticism, exhorted him to study the Kabbala, and reproved him for moral laxities.

The present form of the Maggid Mesharim shows plainly that it was never intended for publication, being merely a collection of stray notes; nor does Karo's son Judah mention the book among his father's works (Introduction to the Responsa). It is known, on the other hand, that during Karo's lifetime the kabbalists believed his Maggid to be actually existent. The Maggid Mesharim, furthermore, shows an alleged knowledge of Karo's public and private life that some feel that no one could have possessed after his death. Some also believe that the fact that the maggid promises things to its favorite that were never fulfilled—e.g., a martyr's death—indicates that it is not the work of a forger, composed for Karo's glorification.

On the other hand, not all are convinced that the work was actually written by Karo himself. Besides the aforementioned facts that neither Yosef nor his son ever mentioned the work in their lifetimes—it was published in Lublin (Poland) more than seventy years after Karo's death and several years after the death of his son—some feel that the sometimes outlandish and excessively metaphysical content does not match the teachings and methodology of Karo. Some have even stated that the assertions of the work are disrespectful to Karo, namely the idea that Karo's brilliant mastery of the Torah, Mishna, and other sacred Jewish texts was merely the dictation of a visiting angelic being and not the result of his own gifted and dedicated study.

Louis Jacobs concluded that "Followers of the Haskalah, embarrassed that one of their heroes, with his keen logical mind should have kept a mystical diary, denied that Caro was the author of the Maggid Mesharim. But its authenticity has been demonstrated beyond doubt" by 1995.

== Contents ==
The text records the words that were dictated to Karo by the Maggid over several decades, writing in each case the date of communication.

The discussions treat of various subjects. The maggid enjoins Karo to be modest in the extreme, to say his prayers with the utmost devotion, to be gentle and patient always. Special stress is laid on asceticism, and Karo is often severely rebuked for taking more than one glass of wine, or for eating meat. Whenever Karo did not follow the severe instructions of his maggid, he suddenly heard its warning voice. His mentor also advised him in family affairs, told him what reputation he enjoyed in heaven, and praised or criticized his decisions in religious questions. Karo received new ideas from his maggid in regard to the Kabbala only. Such information was in the nature of sundry kabbalistic interpretations of the Pentateuch that in content, though not in form, remind one of the theories of Karo's pupil, Moses ben Jacob Cordovero.

The Maggid promised that it would be a messenger of the prophet Elijah that had chosen Karo to be his disciple:

If you stick to me, and my fear, you will deserve to speak with the prophet Elijah being awake. And He will be standing in front of you, or sitting, and he will teach you the words of the Torah.

The book says that reincarnation is part of the answers that Judaism offers to the afterlife experience:

The people come to this World, they come back and go, and they reincarnate again in this World, and they don't rest, like the streams that we have mentioned. The whole World was built on the mystery of reincarnation.

Besides the question of reincarnation, the revelations received by Karo deal with issues recurrent in the Jewish mysticism, like who will be resurrected at the time of resurrection or the deep meaning of the names of the people, but also less common issues such as why some people can not have children. The Maggid Mesharim also stands out for its masterful use of the different types of gematria, from the most simple to the most complex.
