= Joseph Karo =

Spanish rabbi and author on Jewish law (1488–1575)

Rabbi Joseph Karo יוסף קארו
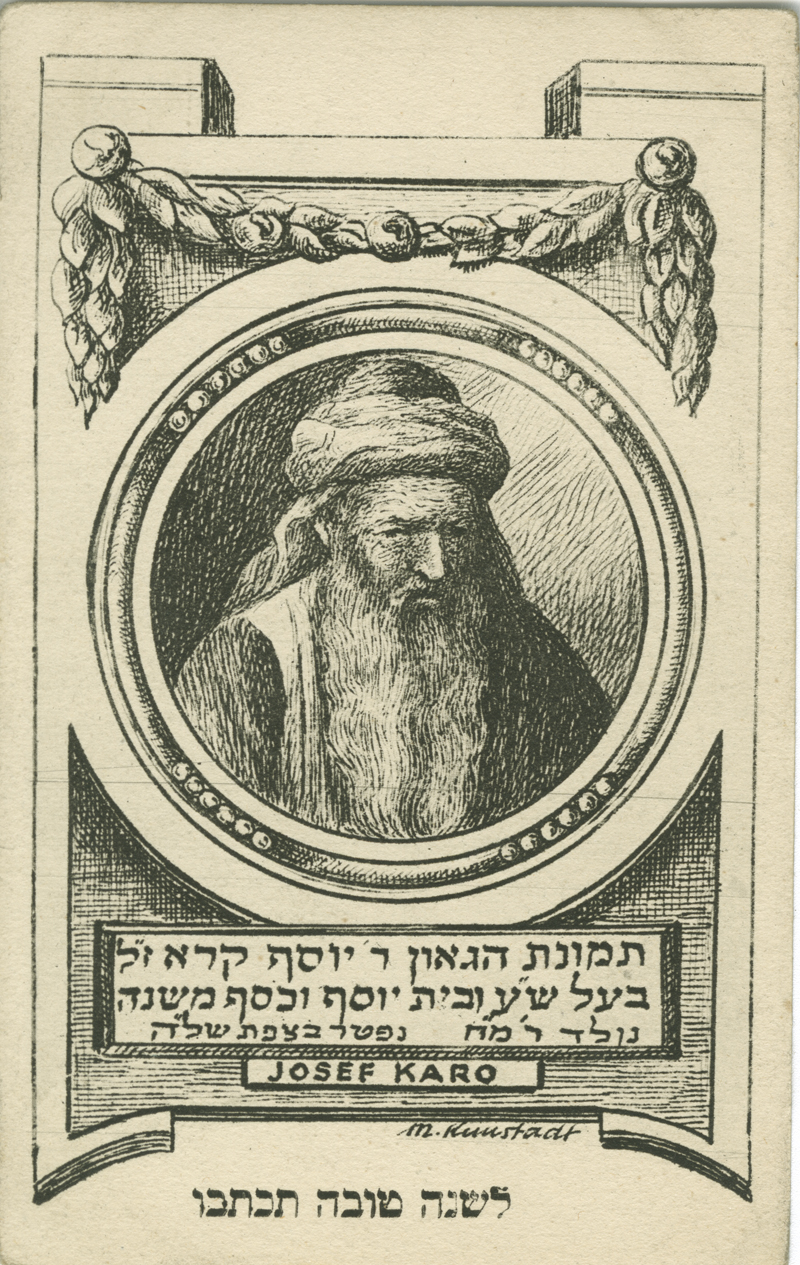
- Portrait by Meir Kunstadt, early 1900s
- Title: הַמְחַבֵּר HaMechaber מָרַן Maran

Personal life
- Born: Joseph ben Ephraim Karo; 1488 Toledo, Kingdom of Toledo, Crown of Castile
- Died: March 24, 1575 (aged 86–87) Safed, Damascus Eyalet, Ottoman Empire
- Buried: Safed Old Jewish Cemetery

Religious life
- Religion: Judaism

Joseph ben Ephraim Karo, also spelled Yosef Caro, or Qaro (Hebrew: יוסף קארו; 1488 – March 24, 1575, 13 Nisan 5335 A.M.), was a prominent Sephardic Jewish rabbi renowned as the author of the last great codification of Jewish law, the Beit Yosef, and its popular analogue, the Shulhan Arukh. Karo is regarded as the preeminent halakhic authority of his time, and is often referred to by the honorific titles HaMechaber (Hebrew: הַמְחַבֵּר, lit. 'the author') and Maran (Jewish Babylonian Aramaic: מָרַן, lit. 'our master').

== Biography ==
Joseph Karo was born in Toledo, Spain, in 1488. In 1492, aged four, he was expelled from Spain with his family as a result of the Alhambra Decree and subsequently settled in the Kingdom of Portugal. After the expulsion of the Jews from Portugal in 1497, the Ottomans invited the Jews to settle within their empire. Karo went with his parents, after a brief move to Morocco, to Nikopolis, then a city under Ottoman rule. In Nikopol, he received his first instruction from his father, who was himself an eminent Talmudist. Following his father's death, Karo's uncle Isaac, an author of biblical commentary, adopted him. He was married twice, firstly to Isaac Saba's daughter, and, then after her death, to the daughter of Hayyim Albalag, both of these men being well-known Talmudists.

Between 1520 and 1522 Karo settled at Adrianople. He later settled in the city of Safed, Israel, where he arrived about 1535, having en route spent several years at Salonica (1533) and Istanbul. By 1555, Joseph Karo was already a resident of the village Biriyya near Safed, during which year he completed writing the first order of the Shulhan Arukh, Orach Chayim.

== Rabbinic career ==
For a short while he lived in Nikopol, but decided to make his way to the Land of Israel so that he could immerse himself in its sanctity and complete his written works. Passing through Salonica, he met the great kabbalist Joseph Taitazak. He continued his journey to the Holy Land via Egypt and eventually settled in Safed.

At Safed, he met Jacob Berab and was soon appointed a member of his rabbinical court. Berab exerted great influence upon him, and Karo became an enthusiastic supporter of Berab's plans for the reinstitution of semikha "rabbinical ordination", which had been in abeyance for over 11 centuries. Karo was one of the first he ordained and after Berab's death, Karo tried to perpetuate the scheme by ordaining his pupil Moshe Alshich. He finally gave up his endeavors, convinced that he could not overcome the opposition to ordination. Karo also established a yeshiva where he taught Torah to over 200 students.

A Yemenite Jewish traveler, Zechariah Dhahiri, visited Rabbi Karo's yeshiva in Safed c. 1567 and noted,

I went one Sabbath to his seat of learning, to see his honourable and glorious magnanimity. I sat down by the entrance, alongside the doorpost of the gate, while my cogitations from foolishness were sorely gripped by fear. Now, that wise man the elder sat upon a chair, and with his mouth he did amplify the subject matter. By an utterance he would draw man away from his burthen caused by the vicissitudes of time, in drawing him nigh unto the faithful God. He would then clothe him, as it were, in sumptuous apparel fit for those who are free, by his recital of the verse: 'The Law of the Lord is perfect, reviving the soul'. He then deliberated on a certain matter by explicating its plain and esoteric sense. Before him were seated about two-hundred very admirable and distinguished pupils, sitting upon benches. When he had finished his words of wisdom, he gestured to a certain disciple opposite him to speak. … Now, when that wise man (i.e., Rabbi Joseph Karo) heard the words of that disciple, he was astonished by his eloquence of speech who had given plausible arguments about the soul, and he then raised him up and exalted him above all the pupils that were with him. … I stayed there awhile, until the wise man (i.e., Rabbi Joseph Karo) had gestured to his pupils to stand up, and then gave order to each one to learn a Mishna. So they went their way, the pupils who were there gathered and the wise man (i.e., Rabbi Joseph Karo).

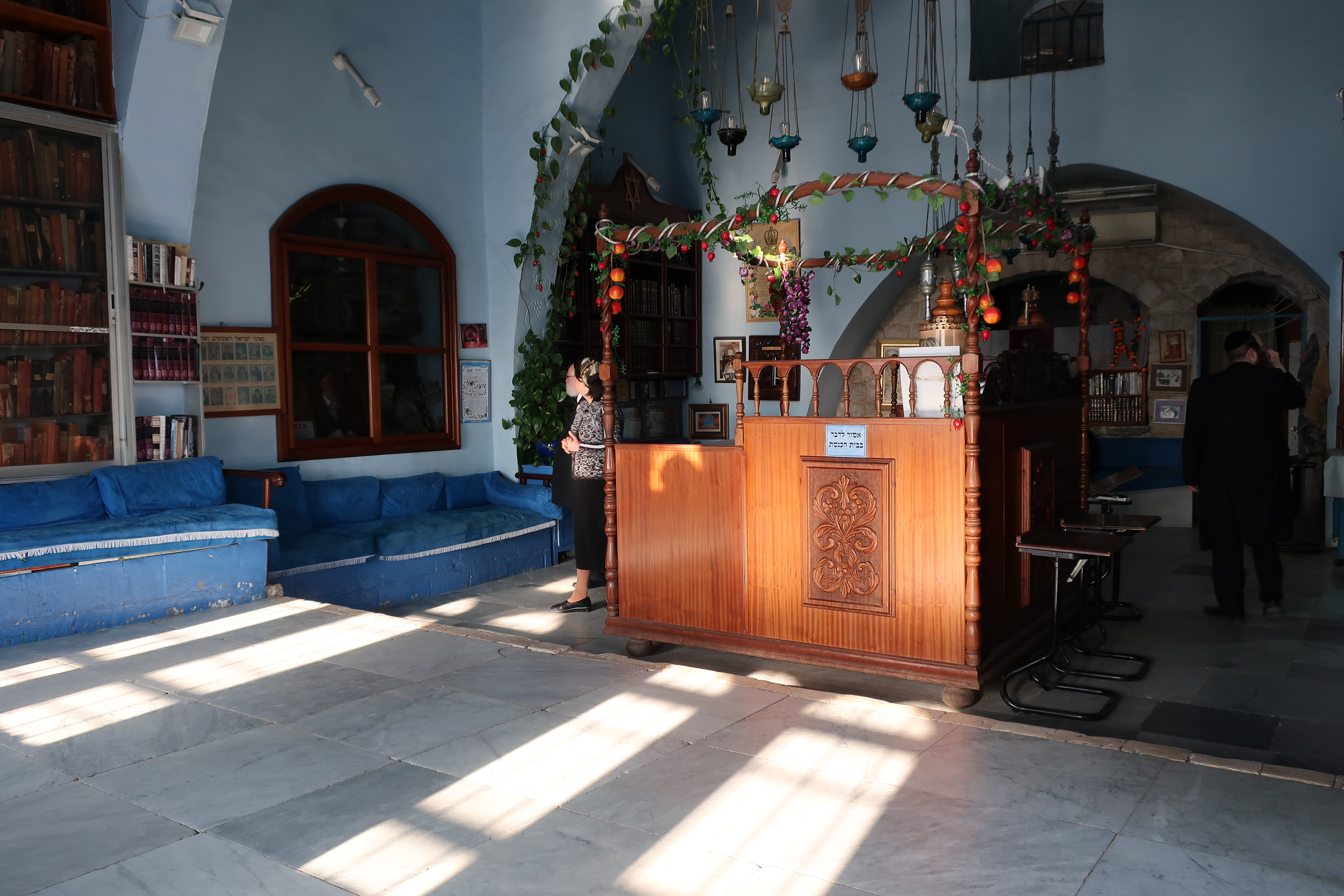
Joseph Karo Synagogue in Safed

When Jacob Berab died, Karo was regarded as his successor, and together with Moses ben Joseph di Trani, he headed the bet din of Safed. By this time, the beth din of Safed had become the central bet din in all of Old Yishuv (southern Ottoman Syria) and of the Jewish diaspora as well. Thus, there was not a single matter of national or global importance that did not come to the attention and ruling of the Safed bet din. Its rulings were accepted as final and conclusive, and sages from every corner of the diaspora sought Karo's halachic decisions and clarifications. Karo was also visited in Safed by the great Egyptian scholars of his day, David ben Solomon ibn Abi Zimra and Yaakov de Castro. He came to be regarded as the leader of the entire generation.

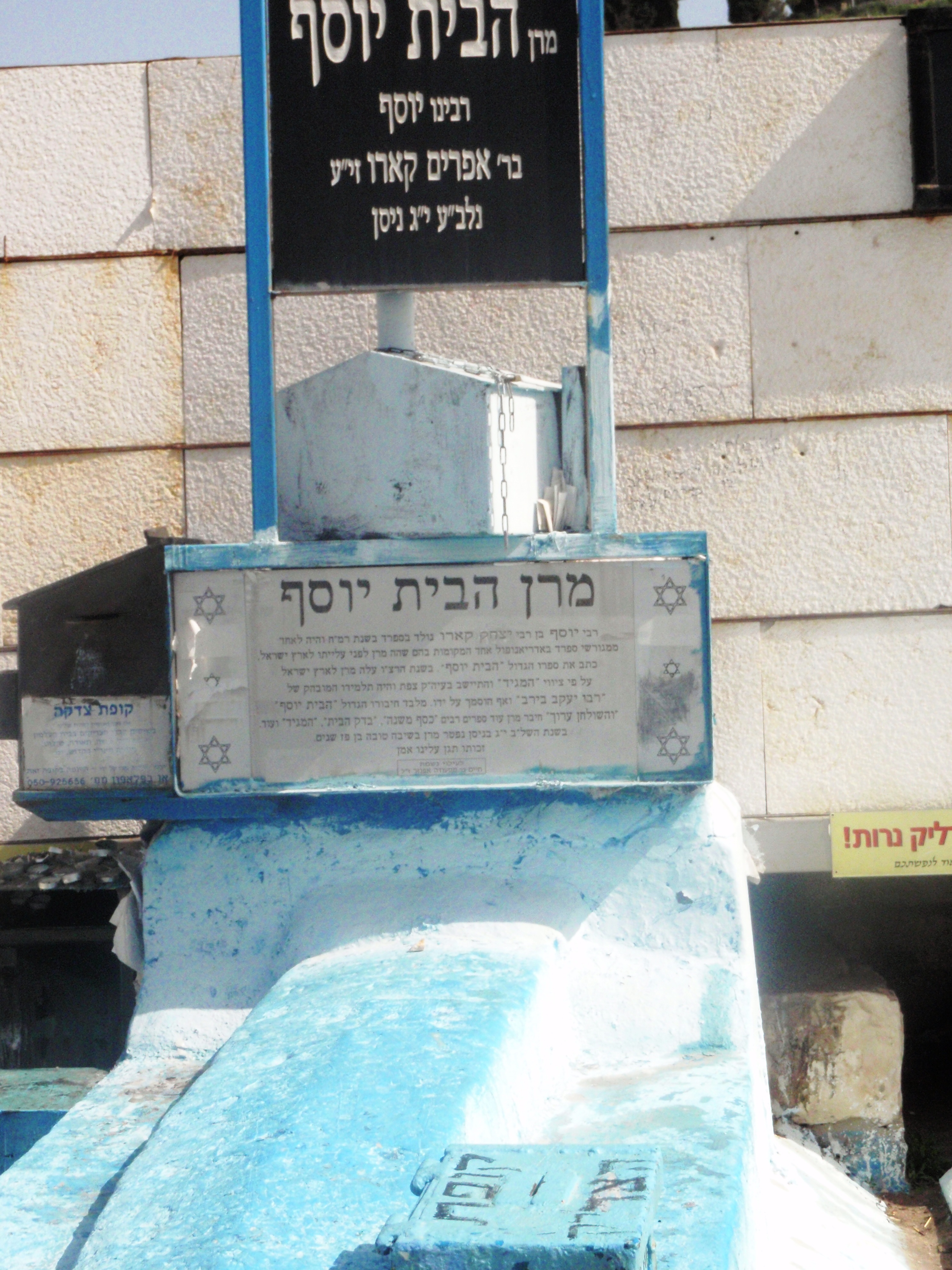
Karo's ohel in Safed

In a dramatic testimonial, Solomon Alkabetz testified that in Salonica, Karo had become one of the rare individuals who merited to be instructed by a maggid—a private preacher who revealed to him many kabbalistic teachings. The maggid exhorted Karo to sanctify and purify himself, and he revealed events that would take place in the future. In the "Gates of Holiness" (שערי קדושה), Hayyim ben Joseph Vital explains that visitation by a maggid is a form of divine inspiration. The teachings of the maggid are recorded in his published work titled Maggid Mesharim "Teacher of Righteousness". Chaim Yosef David Azulai notes that only about one-fiftieth of the manuscript was published. However, in numerous places in the Maggid Meisharim it states, "I am the Mishna that speaks in your mouth," indicating that the Oral Torah itself (of which the Mishna is the fundamental part) spoke within him.

The Maggid promised him that he would have the merit of settling in the Land of Israel, and this promise was fulfilled. Another promise, that he would merit to die a martyr's death like Solomon Molcho had merited, did not transpire.

His reputation during the last thirty years of his life was greater than that of almost any other rabbi since Maimonides. The Italian Jew Azariah dei Rossi, though his views differed widely from Karo's, collected money among the wealthy Italian Jews to have a work of Karo's printed and Moses Isserles compelled the recognition of one of Karo's decisions at Kraków. However, he had questions on the ruling. When some members of the community of Carpentras in the Kingdom of France believed themselves to have been unjustly treated by the majority in a matter relating to taxes, they appealed to Karo, whose letter was sufficient to restore to them their rights In the east, Karo's authority was, if possible, even greater. His name heads the decree of herem (censure) directed against Daud, Joseph Nasi's agent, and it was Karo who commissioned Elisha Gallico to draw up a decree to be distributed among all Jews ordering that Azariah dei Rossi's "Light of the Eyes" (Me'or 'Enayim) be burned. Since Karo died before it was ready for him to sign, the decree was not promulgated, and the rabbis of Mantua contented themselves with forbidding the reading of the work by Jews under twenty-five years of age. Several funeral orations delivered on that occasion and some elegies from Karo's passing have been preserved.

== Published works ==
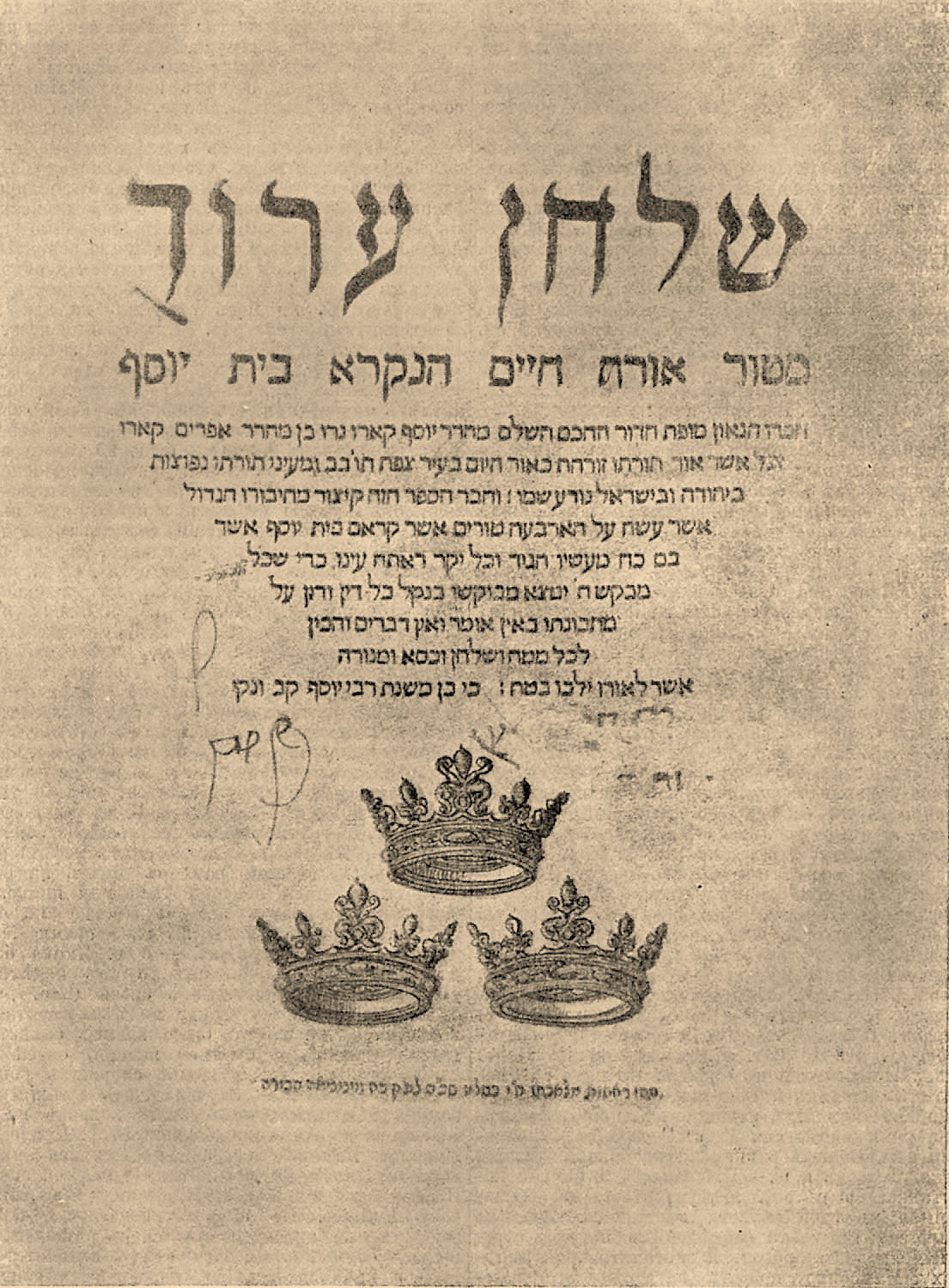
Title page of Karo's Shulchan Aruch

Karo's literary works are among the masterpieces of rabbinic literature. He published during his lifetime:

- Bet Yosef (בית יוסף), a commentary on Arba'ah Turim, the current work of halakha in his days. In this commentary, Karo shows an astounding mastery over the Talmud and the legalistic literature of the Middle Ages. He felt called upon to systematize the laws and customs of Judaism in the face of the disintegration caused by the expulsion of Jews from Spain.
- Shulchan Aruch (שולחן ערוך), a condensation of his decisions in Bet Yosef. Finished in 1555, this code was published in four parts in 1565.
- Kessef Mishneh (כסף משנה, written in Nikopol, published Venice, 1574–75), a commentary of Mishneh Torah by Maimonides. In the introduction, Karo writes that his goal was to quote the source of each law in the Mishneh Torah, and to defend the work from the criticisms of the Abraham ben David.

After his death, there appeared:

- Bedek ha-Bayit (בדק הבית, Salonica, 1605), supplements and corrections to the Bet Yosef;
- Kelalei ha-Talmud (כללי התלמוד, Salonica, 1598), on the methodology of the Talmud;
- Avkath Rochel (אבקת רוכל, Salonica, 1791), Responsa
- Maggid Mesharim (מגיד מישרים, Lublin, 1646), and supplements (Venice, 1646)
- Derashot (דרשות, Salonica, 1799), speeches, in the collection Oz Tzaddikim.

=== Maggid Meisharim ===
The Maggid Mesharim (1646, "Preacher of Righteousness") is a mystical diary in which Karo, over fifty years, recorded the nocturnal visits of an angelic being, his heavenly mentor, the personified Mishna. His visitor spurred him to acts of righteousness and even asceticism, exhorted him to study Kabbala, and reproved him for moral laxities.

== Burial place ==
He is buried in Old Cemetery of Safed.

Other notable rabbis also buried in Old Cemetery of Safed:

- Isaac Luria
- Moshe Alshich
- Solomon Alkabetz
- Moses ben Jacob Cordovero

== See also ==
- List of Jewish Immigrants to the Land of Israel
