= Elisha Gallico =

Elisha ben Gabriel Gallico (Hebrew: אלישע גאליקו; died c. 1583 at Safed) was a talmudist in Ottoman Galilee. He was a pupil of Joseph Caro.

After the death of his mentor, Gallico was nominated dean of the Safed yeshiva. He is frequently mentioned in the responsa collection Abḳat Rokel, in which responsum No. 84 belongs to him. Chaim Benveniste quotes Gallico's responsa in his Keneset ha-Gedolah.

Gallico wrote homiletic-allegorical commentaries on Ecclesiastes (published during the author's lifetime, Venice, 1577), on the Book of Esther (Venice, 1583), and on the Song of Songs (Venice, 1587).
