= Yaakov de Castro =

16th-17th century rabbinic scholar and judge

Yaakov de Castro (Hebrew: יעקב קשטרו), alternative spelling: Yaakov Costaro and Jacob ben Abraham Castro (1525–1610), also known as Maharikash, was a rabbinic scholar, judge and exponent of Jewish law in Cairo, Egypt. A descendant of Jews who fled Portugal during the time of the Portuguese Inquisition, his family eventually came to settle in Egypt. A student of the illustrious Radbaz (Rabbi David ben Solomon ibn Abi Zimra), he is considered the last Chief Rabbi of Egypt to hold sway over the entire Jewish community in Egypt, mostly Musta'arabi Jews, after the abolition of the office of nagid, and whose halachic rulings were widespread across the land.

== Biography ==
In his youth, he studied under the tutelage of Rabbi Levi ibn Habib in Jerusalem. Later, in Egypt, Rabbi Yaakov de Castro served as a judge in the rabbinic court of Cairo, known as Old Egypt. In 1570, he visited Safed in the land of Israel, where he was the honored guest in the home of Rabbi Joseph Karo, who held him in great esteem. He describes this visit by saying that he saw Rabbi Joseph Karo practise in accordance with the first opinion that he brings down in one of the topics addressed in his seminal work, the Shulhan Arukh.

The author of Korei ha-Dorot mentions that during Rabbi Yaakov de Castro’s visit to Safed he died there. The author of Ṭuv Miṣrayyim, however, refutes this claim, saying that Rabbi de Castro returned to Egypt and there died, citing evidence from his own writings (Responsa) where Rabbi de Castro describes his encounter with Rabbi Joseph Karo, author of the Shulhan Arukh, while in Safed, and that he had composed a second book (a commentary on the Shulhan Arukh) after he had completed his Responsa, and that both books were written in Egypt. Rabbi Chaim Joseph David Azulai, in his work Shem ha-Gedolim, takes the same position, citing the grandson of Rabbi de Castro who claims that the Rabbi died in Egypt in [5]370 anno mundi (1610 CE), and that his signature was appended to a court document as late as 1606.

His published works include a compendium of Questions & Responsa entitled Ohalei Yaakov, and a commentary on the Shulhan Arukh entitled ʻErekh Leḥem. He also wrote a commentary on the Tractate Betzah (Yom Ṭov), which was published post-mortem under the name Toldot Yaakov (Jerusalem 1865), a book entitled "Hilkot Nazirut", and a number of similar writings on Talmudic subjects, published by Jacob Hagis in his "Halakot Ketanot", Venice, 1704, as well as other manuscripts which were either unpublished or are no longer extant. Some of the questions addressed to the Rabbi came from Jewish communities in distant places, such as Yemen, and Thessaloniki. Rabbi Castro's Responsa are a primary source for knowledge of the Jewish community in Egypt during those years.

== Manner of adjudication ==
Rabbi Yaakov de Castro's impact was so profound that, in Egypt, they would follow the halachic rulings of Rabbi Castro even in those places where he disagreed with the Shulhan Arukh. It has been noted that many of his rulings in ʻErekh Leḥem coincide with the commentary (gloss) on the Shulhan Arukh written by Rabbi Moses Isserles, although Rabbi Castro most-likely never saw his writings. Rabbi Castro composed his commentary on the Shulhan Arukh before Rabbi Moses Isserles' gloss was sent to the publishers.
