= Beit Yosef (book) =

Book by Rabbi Joseph Karo, a commentary on the Arba'ah Turim ("Tur")

- Author: Joseph Karo
- Language: Hebrew
- Subject: Judaic Law
- Publication date: 1550-1559
- Publication place: Turkey, Land of Israel

Beit Yosef (Hebrew: בית יוסף) (also transliterated Beth Yosef), written by Rabbi Joseph Karo, is a long and detailed commentary on the Halakhic code Arba'ah Turim ("Tur") by Jacob ben Asher (c. 1270–1340). The Shulchan Aruch, which Rabbi Karo wrote later in his life, is a condensation of its rulings.

== Description ==
Beit Yosef is a comprehensive commentary on the Arba'ah Turim, citing and analyzing the Talmudic, Geonic, and major subsequent halachic authorities. It analyzes the theories and conclusions of those authorities cited by the Tur, and also examines the opinions of authorities not mentioned by him. Karo began the Beit Yosef in 1522 at Adrianople, finished it in 1542 at Safed in the Land of Israel; he published it in 1550–59.

Thirty-two authorities, beginning with the Talmud and ending with the works of Rabbi Israel Isserlein (1390–1460 and known as the Terumath ha-Deshen), are summarized and critically discussed in Beit Yosef. No other rabbinical work compares with it in wealth of material. Karo evidences not only an astonishing range of reading, covering almost the entire rabbinic literature up to his time, but also remarkable powers of critical investigation.

In the introduction, Karo clearly states the necessity of, and his reasons for undertaking such a work. The expulsion of the Jews from the Iberian peninsula and the invention of printing had endangered the stability of religious observances on their legal and ritual sides. By the 15th century, the Jews in Spain and the Jews of Portugal followed two main traditions: the older tradition of Maimonides, whose school of thought is heir to the Talmudic academies of Babylonia via the scholars of North Africa; and the Ashkenazi school of the Tosafists whose tradition is based on analytical thinking (related to pilpul), a methodology that was developed in the yeshivot of France and Germany that taught the importance of the minhagim or "customs" of the country. Jews then living in the different kingdoms of Spain had their standard authorities to which they appealed. The most prominent of these were Maimonides, whose opinions were accepted in Andalusia, Valencia, Israel and the Near East; Nahmanides and Solomon ben Adret, whose opinions were accepted in Catalonia; and Asher ben Jehiel and his family, of German origin, whose opinions were accepted in Castile. When the Spanish-Portuguese exiles came to the various communities in the East and West, where usages entirely different from those to which they had been accustomed prevailed, the question naturally arose whether the newcomers, some of whom were men of greater learning than the members of the host communities in Europe, should be ruled by the latter, or vice versa.

The proliferation of printed books, moreover, dramatically increased the availability of halakhic literature; so that many half-educated persons, finding themselves in possession of legal treatises, felt justified in following any ancient authority at will. Karo undertook his Beit Yosef to remedy this problem, quoting and critically examining in his book the opinions of all the major authorities then known.
