= Moshe Provençal =

Italian rabbi (1503–1576)

Moshe ben Avraham Provençal (1503–1576) was an Italian posek, Hebrew grammarian, and mathematician.

== Biography ==
Provençal's surname suggests that his family hailed from Provence. In the aftermath of Provence's incorporation into France in the 1480s, the local Jewish population was expelled between 1498 and 1501. Like much of the exiled Jewish population, it is likely that Provençal's family fled from Provence to Italy in the years shortly before his birth.

Provençal was born in Casale Monferrato in north-west Italy. In 1535, he composed a poetic guide to the rules of Hebrew grammar entitled B'shem Kadmon, which was later published in Venice by the author's grandchildren in October or November 1596. By 1550, he was Chief Rabbi of Mantua, in the North-Italian Duchy of Mantua.

During the infamous Tamari-Venturozzo divorce scandal of 1564, the Italian rabbinate was split over the validity of Samuel Venturozzo's bill of divorce. The halakhic debate quickly descended into a fierce and raging legal feud which eventually came to include halakhic giants from Safed and Thessaloniki. Provençal spearheaded the rabbinic group arguing that Venturozzo's bill of divorce was invalid. In 1566, Provençal published a pamphlet making his case and arguing that the opposing rabbis did not follow proper judicial protocol. By 1574, the debate was resolved, and the Italian rabbinate was reconciled. Provençal died on 30 July 1576.

Provençal's responsa, known as She'elot u'Teshuvot Rabbeinu Moshe Provençal (first printed: 2 vols., Jerusalem, 1989–98), have often been studied and quoted by later rabbinical authorities.
