= Music plagiarism =

Presenting a musician's work as one's own

Music plagiarism is the use or close imitation of another author's music while representing it as one's own original work. Plagiarism in music now occurs in two contexts—with a musical idea (that is, a melody or motif) or sampling (taking a portion of one sound recording and reusing it in a different song). For a legal history of the latter see sampling.

== Overview ==
Any music that follows rules of a musical scale is limited by the ability to use a small number of notes. For example, in 2019 Damien Riehl and Noah Rubin used a computer to compose every possible 12-beat melody without chords in a one-octave heptatonic scale; there are approximately 68.7 billion such combinations at full length, small enough to fit on some commercially available hard drives. All forms of music can be said to include patterns. Algorithms (or, at the very least, formal sets of rules) have been used to compose music for centuries; the procedures used to plot voice-leading in Western counterpoint, for example, can often be reduced to algorithmic determinacy.

For these reasons, accidental or "unconscious" plagiarism is possible. As well, some artists abandon the stigma of plagiarism altogether. Composer Dmitri Shostakovich perhaps commented sarcastically on the issue of musical plagiarism with his use of "We Wish You a Merry Christmas", an instantly recognizable tune, in his Prelude in D-flat, Op. 87, No. 15.

According to U.S. copyright law, in the absence of a confession, musicians who accuse others of stealing their work must prove "access"—the alleged plagiarizer must have heard the song—and "similarity"—the songs must share unique musical components. though it is difficult to come to a definition of what is "similarity".

=== Folk tradition ===
The issue of "plagiarism" in folk music is difficult to define as copying and not crediting songs was common, and the common sharing of musical ideas and expressions was held as a universal trust. Noted blues author and producer Robert Palmer states "It is the custom, in blues music, for a singer to borrow verses from contemporary sources, both oral and recorded, add his own tune and/or arrangement, and call the song his own". Folklorist Carl Lindahl, refers to these recycling of lyrics in songs as "floating lyrics". He defines it within the folk-music tradition as "lines that have circulated so long in folk communities that tradition-steeped singers call them instantly to mind and rearrange them constantly, and often unconsciously, to suit their personal and community aesthetics". In 2012, when Bob Dylan was questioned over his alleged plagiarism of others' music he responded, "It's an old thing—it's part of the tradition. It goes way back." Princeton University professor of American history Sean Wilentz defended Dylan's appropriation of music stating "crediting bits and pieces of another's work is scholarly tradition, not an artistic tradition". In 1998, B.B. King stated on the issue, "I don't think anybody steals anything; all of us borrow."

=== Musical ideas ===
Plagiarism is relevant to different musical styles in different ways.

In classical music, software exists that automatically generates music in the style of another composer, using musical analysis of their works. Most notably, David Cope has written a software system called "Experiments in Musical Intelligence" (or "EMI") that is capable of analyzing and generalizing from existing music by a human composer to generate novel musical compositions in the same style. EMI's output is convincing enough to persuade human listeners that its music is human-generated to a high level of competence. For this reason, Cope's work has been said to not produce original music. A different approach is being followed by Melomics, a technology focused on teaching computers the rules of music composition, not the works of previous composers. This technology has opened the way to truly creative computer-composers, like Iamus and Melomics109. The records produced (Iamus' album and 0music) are in the computer's own style, so they cannot be considered a pastiche or plagiarism of previous works.

According to Theodor W. Adorno's highly controversial view, popular music in general employs extensive plagiarism: variety in the musical material occurs in details whereas genuinely original musical content tends to be sparse when compared to classical or art music. Contradicting this claim is classical music critic Mark Swed of the Los Angeles Times who said that many composers used material from previous composers—for example, "John Williams all but lifted the core idea of his soundtrack score from the Scherzo of Erich Korngold's Symphony in F-sharp Major, written 25 years earlier."

=== Sampling ===
Sampling has long been an area of contention from a legal perspective. Early sampling artists simply used portions of other artists' recordings, without permission; once hip hop and other music incorporating samples began to make significant money, the original artists began to take legal action, claiming copyright infringement. Some sampling artists fought back, claiming their samples were fair use (a legal doctrine in the USA that is not universal). International sampling is governed by agreements such as the Berne Convention for the Protection of Literary and Artistic Works and the WIPO Copyright and Performances and Phonograms Treaties Implementation Act.

Today, most major artists obtain prior authorization to use samples, a process known as "clearing", by gaining permission to use the sample and, usually, paying an upfront fee and/or a cut of the royalties to the original artist. Independent musicians, lacking the funds and legal assistance to clear samples, are at a disadvantage unless they seek the services of a professional sample replay company or producer.

Recently, the free culture movement, started mainly by Lawrence Lessig, has prompted many audio works to be licensed under a Creative Commons license that allows for legal sampling of the work provided the resulting work(s) are licensed under the same terms.

== Cases ==
Usually cases of alleged plagiarism are settled out of court, due to the expense of litigation. Most artists try and settle for costs that will be less than defending costs. Since the 1850s federal courts have published fewer than 100 opinions dealing with this issue. The Columbia Law School Library's Music Plagiarism Project provides information on many cases over the decades, with a few dating back to the 19th century.

=== Successful suits and settlements ===
- The opening melody of the 1920 song "Avalon" resembles a part of Giacomo Puccini's aria E lucevan le stelle, from the 1900 opera Tosca, but in the major key. In 1921 Puccini's publishers sued the song's composers (Vincent Rose, Al Jolson and Buddy DeSylva) for use of the melody, and were awarded $25,000 and all subsequent royalties of the song by the court.
- Solomon Linda was a South African musician, singer and composer best known as the composer of the song "Mbube", which later became the popular music success "The Lion Sleeps Tonight". Despite the popularity and wide use of the song, Linda died impoverished in 1962 of renal failure. In February 2006, Linda's estate attained a legal settlement with Abilene Music company, which had the worldwide rights and had licensed the song to Disney. The primary outcomes of the settlement of February 2006 were:
  - The Linda estate will receive payment for past uses of The Lion Sleeps Tonight and an entitlement to future royalties from its worldwide use.
  - The Lion Sleeps Tonight is acknowledged as derived from Mbube.
  - Solomon Linda is acknowledged as a co-composer of The Lion Sleeps Tonight and will be designated as such in the future.
- In March 1963, the Beach Boys released "Surfin' U.S.A." When the single was released in 1963, the record listed Brian Wilson as the sole composer although the song was published by Arc Music, Chuck Berry's publisher. Later releases, beginning with Best of The Beach Boys in 1966, listed Chuck Berry as the songwriter. Later releases list both writers although the copyright has always been owned, since 1963, by Arc Music. Under pressure from Berry's publisher, Wilson's father and manager, Murry Wilson, had given the copyright, including Brian Wilson's lyrics, to Arc Music.
- George Martin's score for the Beatles' "All You Need Is Love" (1967) contained melodies from several songs thought to be public domain, including "In the Mood", written by Joe Garland and Andy Razaf. While the song was in the public domain, the Glenn Miller arrangement used was not and EMI made a royalty payment to KPM Publishing in July 1967.
- John Lennon's use of a line from Chuck Berry's "You Can't Catch Me" ("Here come up flat top / He was movin' up with me/") the 1969 Beatles' song "Come Together" ("Here comes ol' flat-top / He come groovin' up slowly") led to a lawsuit from Berry's publisher, Big Seven Music Corp. In 1973, a settlement was reached whereby Lennon agreed to record three of Big Seven's songs on his next album. Big Seven Music Corp. again sued Lennon for breach of contract, when his 1974 album, Walls and Bridges, failed to contain all three of the songs, with the court awarding the company US$6,795.
- Led Zeppelin's song "Dazed and Confused" was derived from a 1967 Jake Holmes song of the same name, which had been performed by Jimmy Page when he was with The Yardbirds. In June 2010, Holmes filed a lawsuit against the guitarist for copyright infringement in a United States District Court, claiming Page knowingly copied his work. The case was dismissed with prejudice in January 2012 following a stipulation filed by both parties. The 2012 Led Zeppelin release Celebration Day credits the song to "Jimmy Page, inspired by Jake Holmes".
- On Led Zeppelin's album Led Zeppelin II (1969), parts of the song "Bring It On Home" were copied from Sonny Boy Williamson's 1963 recording of "Bring It On Home", written by Willie Dixon. On the same album, "The Lemon Song" included an adaptation of Howlin' Wolf's "Killing Floor". In 1972, Arc Music, the publishing arm of Chess Records, brought a lawsuit against Led Zeppelin for copyright infringement over "Bring It On Home" and "The Lemon Song"; the case was settled out of court for an undisclosed sum. Earlier UK pressings of the album listed the song as "Killing Floor" and part credited it to Burnett, Howling Wolf's real name.
- Led Zeppelin's song "Whole Lotta Love" contained lyrics that were derivative of Willie Dixon's 1962 song "You Need Love". In 1985, Dixon filed a copyright infringement suit, resulting in an out-of-court settlement. Later pressings of Led Zeppelin II credit Dixon as co-writer.
- George Harrison was successfully sued in a prolonged suit that began in 1971 for plagiarizing The Chiffons' "He's So Fine" (1963) for the melody of his own "My Sweet Lord" (1970). In the ruling, the judge stated that he believed Harrison had not intentionally copied the song, but more than likely experienced an episode of cryptomnesia. "George Harrison was guilty of nothing but forgetting that if you repeat a three-syllable phrase three times over six measures, the probability someone hasn't done it before is virtually nil," says songwriter Nappy Martin. "That's not plagiarism, that's earnest tribute—just as he even declared was intended to Edwin Hawkins in his song."
- In 1971, Johnny Cash paid songwriter Gordon Jenkins an out-of-court settlement of US$75,000 for plagiarizing liberally from Jenkins' 1953 song "Crescent City Blues", for Cash's 1955 single "Folsom Prison Blues" (re-released in 1968).
- Rod Stewart was successfully sued by Brazilian songwriter Jorge Ben Jor, over "Da Ya Think I'm Sexy?" melody and chorus similarities to Ben's 1972 song "Taj Mahal".
- In autumn 1984 and throughout 1985, Huey Lewis sued Ray Parker Jr., for plagiarism, alleging that Parker stole the melody of the song "Ghostbusters" (the theme from the movie of the same name), from Lewis's 1983 song "I Want A New Drug". Lewis dropped the lawsuit after the two parties settled out-of-court in 1995. Lewis had been approached to compose the main theme song for the Ghostbusters movie, but had declined due to his work on the soundtrack for Back to the Future. It was reported in 2001 that Lewis allegedly breached an agreement not to mention the original suit, doing so on VH1's Behind the Music.
- According to the book Sharp Dressed Men by former ZZ Top stage manager David Blayney, who was with the band for 15 years, sound engineer Linden Hudson co-wrote much of the material on the ZZ Top album Eliminator album as a live-in high-tech music teacher to band members Frank Beard and Billy Gibbons. Despite continued denials by the band, it settled a five-year legal battle with Hudson in 1986, paying him $600,000 after he proved he held the copyright to the song "Thug" which appeared on Eliminator.
- Madonna was successfully sued over her 1986 hit "Papa Don't Preach" by songwriters Donna Weiss and Bruce Robert who received financial compensation after claiming the singer's hit song was stealing from the 1985 track "Sugar Don't Bite" they made for Sam Harris.
- Due to similarities to "The Air That I Breathe", a song recorded by The Hollies in 1973, Radiohead were successfully sued for plagiarism over their 1992 song "Creep". Consequently, songwriters Albert Hammond and Mike Hazlewood are credited as co-writers.
- Led Zeppelin also paid a settlement to the publisher of Ritchie Valens' song "Ooh! My Head" over "Boogie with Stu" (from their album Physical Graffiti) which borrowed from Valens' song, although they had already listed Mrs Valens in the credits.
- Madonna had to pay $2.5 million to Lebanese singer Fairuz who sued for sampling her song without permission and without any financial compensation.
- Oasis's 1994 single "Whatever" was initially credited as being written by the band's lead guitarist Noel Gallagher; a subsequent lawsuit awarded a co-writing credit to musical comedian Neil Innes due to similarities to his song "How Sweet to Be an Idiot". Oasis were also successfully sued for $500,000 by The New Seekers after the 1994 song "Shakermaker" was alleged to have taken its melody from "I'd Like to Teach the World to Sing". An Oasis song, "Step Out", was originally intended for the (What's the Story) Morning Glory? album but was taken off after Stevie Wonder requested 10% of the royalties, as the chorus bore a similarity to his hit "Uptight (Everything's Alright)". Instead it was placed as a B-side on their 1996 single "Don't Look Back in Anger", and "Uptight" writers Wonder, Henry Cosby and Sylvia Moy received credit for writing the song, along with Noel Gallagher.
- In 2000, a U.S. Court of Appeals ruled against the Rolling Stones' former record company ABKCO Records, determining that two Robert Johnson songs recorded by the group, "Love in Vain" and "Stop Breaking Down" were not in the public domain.
- Madonna lost a 2005 judgement against a Belgian songwriter named Salvatore Acquaviva who was claiming that the popstar 1998 hit "Frozen" was lifting from his early-1980s song, "Ma Vie Fout le camp". The judge declined to award damages, but did order the withdrawal of all remaining discs for sale and barred the song from airplay on Belgian TV and radio. See Frozen (Madonna song): Plagiarism.
- Madonna paid $600,000 to the family of photographer Guy Bourdin after the artist's heir sued her for plagiarizing his father's work to make her Hollywood music video.
- American musician Les Paul was successfully sued for plagiarizing Romanian composer Richard Stein's "Sanie cu zurgălăi" (1937) as "Johnny (Is the Boy for Me)" (1953).
- A lawsuit filed by Tommy Dunbar and James Gangwer of the 1970s power pop band the Rubinoos alleged Avril Lavigne stole their song "I Wanna Be Your Boyfriend" and reworked it into her best-selling single "Girlfriend". The case was settled for an undisclosed sum in January 2008.
- The Black Eyed Peas were successfully sued by Ohio disc jockey Lynn Tolliver, claiming that his song "I Need a Freak" was sampled without his permission in the Black Eyed Peas song "My Humps". Lynn Tolliver won $1.2 million.
- In 2009, Norman Lurie, then the head of Larrikin Music, successfully sued the members of the disbanded Australian group Men at Work on the basis that "a pattern of notes in five bars of a 93-bar song" in their hit "Down Under" sounded too much like the song "Kookaburra sits in the old gum tree", to which Larrikin owned the rights.
- Will.i.am and Chris Brown were accused of stealing house producers Mat Zo and Arty track "Rebound", upon the release of their 2013 collaborative single "Let's Go". This claim was backed by Anjunabeats, the record label behind the producers, in a formal public statement. Will.i.am admitted that he did take the track, following an outcry on social media, and that he was rectifying the issue in an undisclosed licensing deal with the producers.
- Shakira's Spanish-language single "Loca" was ruled a copy from another songwriter's work. On 19 August 2014, Alvin Hellerstein, senior judge of the U.S. District Court for the Southern District of New York, concluded that the Spanish version of "Loca" had been plagiarised from "Loca con su Tiguere", a mid-1990s song composed by Dominican songwriter Ramon "Arias" Vasquez. Hellerstein ruled in favour of Vasquez and found the two songs to be similar in structure and rhythm. As the Spanish version of "Loca" features Bello singing numerous portions, the judge reasoned that it too was plagiarised from Vasquez's song. After a trial phase, SonyATV Latin and Sony/ATV Discos (the distributors of the Spanish version of "Loca" in the United States) will pay damages to Mayimba Music, the owner of the rights to Vasquez's song and the plaintiff in the lawsuit.
- Robin Thicke and Pharrell Williams were successfully sued for plagiarising Marvin Gaye's song "Got to Give It Up" for his single "Blurred Lines", and "After the Dance" for "Love After War", following a unanimous jury verdict on 10 March 2015. Marvin Gaye's children, Frankie Gaye and Nona Gaye, launched legal proceedings against EMI Records and Thicke in October 2013. In a separate allegation, Bridgeport Music claims "Blurred Lines" was remarkably similar to Funkadelic's "Sexy Ways". Both Thicke and Pharrell attempted to thwart the Gaye and Bridgeport lawsuits by claiming their copyright claims were invalid. Thicke and Pharrell were ordered to pay US$7.4 million in damages to the Gaye heirs.
- In April 2015, British producer Mark Ronson was forced to add additional credits to "Uptown Funk" (featuring Bruno Mars) after an out-of-court settlement had been reached with The Gap Band's publishing company, Minder Music. Charlie Wilson, Robert Wilson, Ronnie Wilson, Rudolph Taylor and producer Lonnie Simmons were added as co-writers, and that they would receive a 17% songwriting credit each. Minder Music filed a claim into YouTube's content management system, which prevented publishers to receive their payment, after the song was released failing to credit the original songwriters.
- Bruno Bergonzi co-wrote with Michele Vicino the song "Takin’ Me to Paradise", published on 1983. This song appeared on a number of compilations, internationally distributed. Italian Court d'Assise ruled on 2007 that Prince's 1994 hit, "The Most Beautiful Girl in the World", was a plagiarism from the song by two Italian writers Bergonzi and Vicino. The final sentence, by the Court of Cassation of Rome, arrived in May 2015 and recognized Bergonzi and Vicino as the authors of "The Most Most Beautiful Girl in the World" music.
- The Christian hip hop artist Flame, along with producer Chike Ojukwu and co-songwriter Emanuel Lambert, in 2014 sued the pop artist Katy Perry for plagiarizing their 2008 song "Joyful Noise", which featured Lecrae and John Reilly, in her 2013 single "Dark Horse", featuring Juicy J and produced by Dr. Luke, Cirkut, and Max Martin. The beat and instrumental line of "Dark Horse" was ruled by a federal jury in 2019 to have violated the copyright of Flame's song, with Perry, Juicy J, Dr. Luke, Cirkut, Max Martin, along with the co-songwriter Sarah Hudson and the labels and distributors Capitol Records, Warner Bros. Music Corporation, Kobalt Publishing, and Kasz Money Inc all found liable. On 17 March 2020, Judge Christina Snyder reversed the decision.
- In May 2018, Irish alternative rock band The Script filed a copyright infringement lawsuit against British singer James Arthur, alleging that Arthur's 2016 single "Say You Won't Let Go" sounded similar to their 2008 single "The Man Who Can't Be Moved". The case was ultimately settled in December 2018, with the judge ruling in favor of The Script, and Danny O'Donoghue and Mark Sheehan, the writers of "The Man Who Can't Be Moved", each receiving an official co-writing credit for "Say You Won't Let Go".
- Belgian brothers Edward and Daniel van Passel sued R&B artist R. Kelly for plagiarising their song "If We Can Start All Over" in Michael Jackson's 1995 single "You Are Not Alone". A Belgian court rejected their claims in 2003, noting that the 43.46% similarity between the two melodies was a mere coincidence but the ruling was reversed in 2007, based on the fact that Kelly's earliest evidence of writing the score was August 1995, 21 months after the brothers registered their score for "If We Can Start All Over" and ordered the withdrawal of all remaining discs for sale and barred the song from airplay on Belgian TV and radio as a result. See You Are Not Alone § Plagiarism lawsuit

=== Unsuccessful suits ===
- During the mid-1930s, Ira Arnstein became convinced that major pop songwriters had been illegally copying his work. During 1936–46 he brought forth five plagiarism lawsuits though none proved successful.
- A number of people have put forth the opinion that the introduction, and opening guitar arpeggios, of Led Zeppelin's "Stairway to Heaven" bears a close resemblance to the 1968 instrumental "Taurus" by the group Spirit. In May 2014 an attorney hired by Randy California's heirs filed a copyright infringement seeking a co-writing credit for California on "Stairway to Heaven". A Los Angeles jury ruled in favor of Led Zeppelin in June 2016. On 5 October 2020 the US Supreme Court again ruled in favor of Led Zeppelin.
- In 1994 John Fogerty was sued for self-plagiarism after leaving Fantasy Records and pursuing a solo career with Warner Bros. Records. Fantasy still owned the rights to the Creedence Clearwater Revival (Fogerty's former band) library. Saul Zaentz, the owner of Fantasy, claimed Fogerty's song "The Old Man Down the Road" was a musical copy of the Creedence song "Run Through the Jungle". A jury found that "Old Man" was not derivative. See Fogerty v. Fantasy.
- In 1993 Killing Joke sued Nirvana alleging that the riff for the latter's song "Come as You Are" was copied from the riff for their song "Eighties". The lawsuit was dropped after the sudden death of Nirvana frontman Kurt Cobain.
- The song "Thunderbird" was originally written and performed by the Nightcaps, a band formed in the 1950s when the members were teenagers. The Nightcaps performed the song and distributed it on their album Wine, Wine, Wine but never applied for copyright. ZZ Top began performing its version of the song in 1975, and has conceded that its version is lyrically and musically identical to the Nightcaps' song. The Nightcaps sued ZZ Top for, among other things, copyright infringement, but their claims were dismissed (in 1995) because, in part, ZZ Top had registered a copyright on the song in 1975.
- In 2003 Michael Cottrill and Lawrence E. Wnukowski claimed that Britney Spears' "Can't Make You Love Me", from her 2000 album Oops!... I Did It Again, misappropriated substantial melodic material from their song "What You See is What You Get". The court was skeptical on the question of defendant's access to the plaintiff's work.
- Ronald H. Selle sued the Bee Gees, alleging their 1977 hit "How Deep Is Your Love" stole the melody of his own never-released 1975 song, "Let It End". The Bee Gees prevailed at trial on motion of judgment notwithstanding the verdict. Selle appealed, but the Seventh Circuit Court of Appeals upheld the verdict.
- On 4 December 2008 guitarist Joe Satriani filed a copyright infringement suit in Los Angeles federal court against Coldplay, claiming the Coldplay song "Viva la Vida" includes "substantial original portions" of the Satriani song "If I Could Fly" from his 2004 album, Is There Love in Space?. Coldplay has denied the allegation, which has resulted in further legal action from Satriani. On 14 September 2009, the case was dismissed by the California Central District Court.
- Baltimore songwriter Ray Repp sued composer Andrew Lloyd Webber, alleging the theme song from the musical The Phantom of the Opera was taken from his song "Till You". In 1998, a jury found Webber not liable for plagiarism.
- Elton John, Bernie Taupin, and Big Pig Music were accused of plagiarism by South African photographer and songwriter Guy Hobbs. Hobbs wrote a song in 1982 titled "Natasha", about a Russian waitress on a cruise ship, who was never allowed to leave it. The song was copyrighted in 1983, and sent to Big Pig Music (John's publisher) for a possible publishing deal, but Hobbs never heard back from the publisher. In 2001, Hobbs came across the lyric book to "Nikita" and noticed similarities with his song. Despite repeated attempts by Hobbs to contact John over the issue, he never heard from him, and commenced legal action in 2012. On 31 October 2012, a federal judge granted John and Taupin's motion to dismiss, finding that the song did not infringe Hobbs's copyright because the only similar elements were generic images and themes that are not protected under copyright law.
- R&B singer Jesse Braham sued Taylor Swift for $42 million (Braham v Sony Music Publishing). Braham alleged that Swift had plagiarized his song "Haters Gone Hate" in her 2014 hit "Shake It Off". The court dismissed the action, holding that Braham had failed to establish a sufficient claim.

=== Unsettled, alleged, and forgiven incidents ===
The following are accusations of plagiarism appearing in notable media:

- Ritchie Valens' 1959 song "Ooh! My Head" is a thinly veiled cover of Little Richard's 1958 single "Ooh! My Soul". Richard was never credited in the Valens song.
- The opening of the Beatles' 1963 song "All My Loving" sounds almost identical to the first two bars of the solo in the Dave Brubeck Quartet's song "Kathy's Waltz", which was released in 1959.
- Peter Meaden, manager of the High Numbers (before the band changed their name to the Who), has been accused of plagiarising a 1963 recording of "Misery" by the Dynamics, for their debut single A-side "Zoot Suit". The B-side "I'm the Face" guitar and harmonica riffs are also very similar to Slim Harpo's "I've Got Love If You Want It". Both songs are credited only to Peter Meaden on the single.
- The Led Zeppelin song "Black Mountain Side" sounds similar to Bert Jansch's version of the traditional folk song "Down by Blackwaterside". No legal action was ever taken against Led Zeppelin, because it could not be proved that the recording in itself constituted Jansch's own copyright, as the basic melody is traditional.
- Deep Purple's 1970 song "Child in Time" is based on It's a Beautiful Day's "Bombay Calling", who were never credited. In an interview with author Martin Popoff, Ian Gillan admitted the song was "nicked".
- Deep Purple's 1970 song "Black Night" is a liberal uncredited take of Ricky Nelson's 1962 single "Summertime", itself a reworking of the George Gershwin standard, using the same two-bar pentatonic riff. In an interview on Heavy Metal Britannia, Jon Lord admitted the song was "nicked".
- Reviews of the song "Since I've Been Loving You" by Led Zeppelin (from their Led Zeppelin III album) have noted its similarity to the Moby Grape song "Never". No legal action is known to have been taken.
- The riff in Deep Purple's 1972 song "Smoke on the Water" bears a resemblance to Astrud Gilberto's 1965 song "Maria Quiet", arranged by Gil Evans.
- Musicologists have claimed Pink Floyd's album The Dark Side of the Moon contains uncredited elements taken from American electronic music duo Beaver & Krause's 1971 album Gandharva. In particular, the opening sound effects to "Soft/White", the vocal performance in the song "The Great Gig in the Sky" sounds identical to "Walkin'", and the saxophone phrasing of "Us and Them" is similar to "By Your Grace" and "Good Places".
- Eric Clapton claimed sole credit for "Give Me Strength", a song released in 1974, but it was originally written in 1939 by Chicago gospel singer-songwriter Louise King Mathews. Mathews was financially disadvantaged and could not afford to take the copyright matter to court when she heard the Clapton version during the 1970s.
- Australian rock band The Angels have been accused of plagiarizing Status Quo's 1974 song "Lonely Night" for their 1976 anthem "Am I Ever Gonna See Your Face Again". When producers Vanda & Young first heard the song in the studio, they urged the band to re-record it at a different speed and add sound effects to avoid a potential lawsuit.
- Music producer Quincy Jones claims Michael Jackson plagiarized the synthesizer bass riff for "Billie Jean" from the earlier 1982 Donna Summer arrangement of "State of Independence".
- "Start!" by The Jam (1980) is based on both the main guitar riff and bass riff of the Beatles' 1966 song "Taxman", written by George Harrison, from the album Revolver. "To be Someone" and "Liza Radley" also use the "Taxman" bass line, as does "Dreams of Children", B-side to "Going Underground", played then as a lead guitar riff. Bassist Bruce Foxton commented on the similarity:

We were listening a lot to The Beatles' Revolver album. It wasn't intentional, but 'Taxman' subconsciously went in and when we came up with the idea for "Start!" that's what went in. It isn’t exactly the same thankfully, otherwise I'm sure Paul McCartney would have thought about suing us!

- Madonna's 1984 song "Material Girl" has similar strophes to Melissa Manchester's "You Should Hear How She Talks About You", released in 1982. Despite being highlighted by many observers, there never was official credit given for this interpolation.
- Rod Stewart's 1988 single "Forever Young" not only has the same title as the 1973 Bob Dylan song of the same name, but similar musical ideas and lyrics. When this was pointed out to Stewart, he agreed to split royalties 50-50, and Stewart donated his share to charity.
- In 1997, The Rolling Stones voluntarily credited k.d. lang and her writing partner Ben Mink on their song "Anybody Seen My Baby?", after a representative of the group noticed a resemblance to lang's 1992 hit single, "Constant Craving".
- Madonna's music video for her 1998 song "Ray of Light" was claimed by the music video director Stefano Salvatito be a plagiarism of his work for Biagio Antonacci's song "Non è mai stato subito"
- Coldplay were briefly accused of copying portions of "Viva la Vida" from "The Songs I Didn't Write" by American alternative band Creaky Boards. Creaky Boards later retracted the accusations and speculated that both songs may have been inspired by the video game The Legend of Zelda.
- A portion of the Bruce Springsteen single "Radio Nowhere" sounds similar to Tommy Tutone's 1982 hit, "867-5309/Jenny". Tommy Heath's response was "I'm really honored at a similarity, if any, I think there's too much suing in the world now."
- The New York Post reported that similarities between the Red Hot Chili Peppers' "Dani California" and Tom Petty's "Mary Jane's Last Dance" could turn into a lawsuit. Petty responded in a Rolling Stone interview:

The truth is, I seriously doubt that there is any negative intent there. And a lot of rock & roll songs sound alike. Ask Chuck Berry. The Strokes took "American Girl" [for their song "Last Nite"], and I saw an interview with them where they actually admitted it. That made me laugh out loud. I was like, "OK, good for you." It doesn't bother me.

- Søren Rasted (formerly of Aqua) has been accused of copying Kate Bush's "Running Up that Hill" for a song composed for the winner of the X Factor Denmark contest.
- Korean pop artist G-Dragon has been accused of plagiarism by Sony Music, as his tracks "Heartbreaker" and "Butterfly" are similar to Flo Rida's "Right Round" and Oasis's "She's Electric", respectively.
- iTunes has found cases of musical plagiarism using software that automatically identifies a CD's track information when it's loaded, most notably many instances with pianist Joyce Hatto.
- The Black Eyed Peas were charged with plagiarism in January 2010 by Ebony Latrice Batts (known on stage as Phoenix Phenom), who claimed that "Boom Boom Pow" is a copy of her song "Boom Dynamite", which she sent to Interscope Records, the Black Eyed Peas' record label. The suit is ongoing.
- Stefani Joanne Angelina Germanotta, better known by her stage name Lady Gaga, garnered much controversy in 2011 for her single "Born this Way", which critics said shared strong similarities with Madonna's 1989 hit single "Express Yourself". When interviewed by ABC News in 2012, Madonna said, "When I heard "Born this Way" on the radio ... I said, 'that sounds very familiar' ... It felt reductive." She also told The Newsweek Daily Beast Company what she had in mind when she heard "Born This Way": "I thought, 'What a wonderful way to redo my song'. I mean, I recognized the chord changes. I thought it was ... interesting."
- Australian singer Delta Goodrem has been accused of copying the music of Arcade Fire's 2005 song "Rebellion (Lies)" for her 2012 single "Sitting on Top of the World"; however, no legal action is known to have been taken against her by the band.
- The Beastie Boys were sued in May 2012 by Hip Hop label Tuf America, claiming misappropriation and infringing copyright for "Hold It, Now Hit It" and "The New Style" from Licensed to Ill, allegedly using portions of Trouble Funk's 1982 song "Drop the Bomb". The Beastie Boys were also sued for using the "Drop the Bomb" drum sound in Paul's Boutique track "Car Thief" and sampling Trouble Funk's 1982 song "Say What?" for another Paul's Boutique track entitled "Shadrach", without permission.
- Madonna has been accused of plagiarism by record label Vallejo Music Group (VMG). VMG claimed Madonna stole samples from the 1977 single "Ooh I Love It (Love Break)" by Salsoul Orchestra, for her 1990 charting song "Vogue". VMG alleged in the lawsuit that horns and strings were taken from the earlier track and used in "Vogue" without permission, and intentionally hidden within the mix. The lawsuit was filed in July 2012 with the company seeking damages in addition to royalties gained from "Vogue".
- Def Leppard is considering legal action against One Direction, over claims the boy band's single "Midnight Memories" sounds similar to "Pour Some Sugar on Me". In September 2014, some observers noticed similarities between One Direction's song "Steal My Girl" and the piano melody of Journey's 1983 song "Faithfully".
- In August 2014, American singer Meghan Trainor was accused of lifting the melody from a 2006 song called "Happy Mode" by the Korean pop band Koyote, for her single "All About That Bass". Songwriter Joo Young-hoon initially responded that "it must be a coincidence", but later revealed he was consulting with a specialized lawyer over the allegations. Joo announced in September that he would be filing a lawsuit against Trainor.
- Following the "Blurred Lines" plagiarism verdict, members of Marvin Gaye's family noted similarities between Pharrell Williams' award-winning hit single "Happy" and Gaye's song "Ain't That Peculiar", written by Smokey Robinson and fellow Miracles.
- In 2015, the web page of the Australian music TV channel MAX published an article by music writer Nathan Jolly that noted similarities between Guns N' Roses' song "Sweet Child o' Mine" and the song "Unpublished Critics" by the Australian band Australian Crawl, from 1981. The article posted videos of both songs, inviting readers to compare the two. It also cited a reader's comment on an earlier article that had originally drawn attention to the similarities between the songs. The story went "viral" quickly, encouraging several comments on both the MAX article and the suggestion that the Australian song had influenced "Sweet Child o' Mine".
- In July 2015, a lawsuit was launched against Rod Stewart by the estate of blues singer Armenter "Bo Carter" Chatmon alleging that "Corrina, Corrina", a track on Stewart's 2013 release Time, plagiarizes Chatmon's "Corrine, Corrina", which he wrote in 1928.
- In November 2015, R&B musician Jesse Braham commenced a lawsuit against singer Taylor Swift over the similarities in lyrics between his 2013 single "Hater Gonna Hate" and Swift's 2014 hit "Shake It Off". Braham is seeking a writing credit and $42 million in damages.
- On 9 June 2016, it was revealed that English singer Ed Sheeran was being sued by songwriters Martin Harrington and Thomas Leonard, composers of Matt Cardle's 2011 single "Amazing", for $20 million for copyright infringement over Sheeran's 2015 single "Photograph". The lawsuit states: "Given the striking similarity between the chorus of 'Amazing' and 'Photograph', (the) defendants knew when writing, publishing, recording, releasing, and distributing 'Photograph' that they were infringing on a pre-existing musical composition."
- In December 2015, fans of Kurdish-Turk singer Ahmet Kaya suggested that Adele's song Million Years Ago was a plagiarism of his 1985 song Acilara Tutunmak ("Clinging to Pain") as they bear a strong melodic similarity. Kaya's widow stated that she did not think a worldwide entertainer like Adele would plagiarize a song. Adele's spokesperson has never responded to these allegations. Furthermore, fans have created mashups of the two songs.
- Indian Music composer Gopi Sunder's song "Nam Ooru Bengaluru" used in the Bangalore Days (2014) is very similar to the single of Bryan Adams's Summer of '69. In 2016 he used "Take you down" or song #20, from Daniel Pemberton's score for the Guy Ritchie movie The man from U.N.C.L.E (2015) in a movie trailer of Kali (2016).
- The copyright status of "We Shall Overcome" has been disputed. A lawsuit argues that the song is in the public domain, as it stemmed from an earlier tune "We Will Overcome".
- Singer-songwriter Richard Morrill sued singer Gwen Stefani, her company Harajuku Lovers, Pharrell Williams and Interscope Records, claiming their single "Spark the Fire" infringes on his rights in a 1996 song he wrote called "Who's Got My Lightah".
- In September 2019, Fiona Apple called out rapper Lil Nas X for an unpaid sample of her song "Every Single Night" on his track "Kim Jung" but has not taken any legal action.

== See also ==
- Plagiarism detection
- Contrafact
- Credit (creative arts)
- List of musical medleys
- Mashup (music)
- Musical quotation
- Parody music
- Potpourri (music)
- Quodlibet
- Source criticism in the arts
- Variation (music)
