= Francisco José Vico Vela =

Francisco Vico
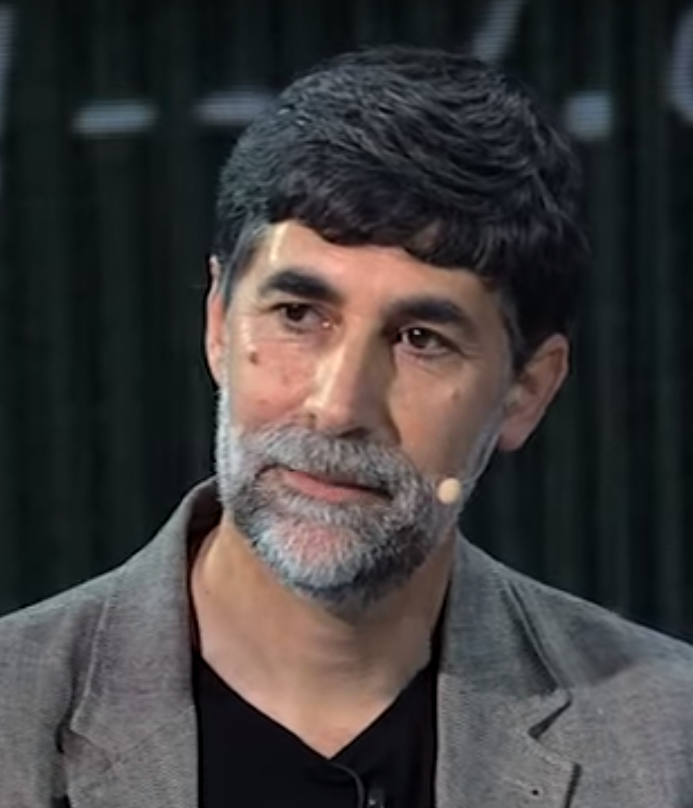
- Francisco Vico at the Seoul Digital Forum panel session "Redefining 'Intelligence': What can we expect from Artificial Intelligence?"
- Known for: Contributions to the field of artificial creativity (Melomics project)
- Scientific career
- Fields: Computer science
- Workplaces: University of Málaga
- Website: uma.es

Francisco José Vico Vela is a scientist and engineer who is a full professor of artificial intelligence at the University of Málaga. As a researcher, Vico is founder and head of the Biomimetics and EdTech research groups at the University of Málaga, and founder and CEO of the university spin-offs Melomics Media and Digitomica as an entrepreneur. His work is mostly known for using evolutionary computation in the field of automated computer composition and industrial design.

== Education and career ==
Vico graduated from the University of Málaga with a BA in computer science in 1991 and was the recipient of a doctoral grant, receiving his PhD in 1995. After doing a postdoc in Buffalo, New York, Vico started working as a lecturer in computer science at the University of Malaga in 1996, and then became an assistant professor in 2000 and full professor in 2012.

== Basic research ==
Vico developed research in computational neuroscience and computer vision from his doctoral thesis (contributing with models of neuron function) until 2005, where his interests turned to evolutionary computation and artificial life. He has advised or co-advised eight PhD theses, led more than 40 research projects as principal investigator, mostly with public funding, and has two patents.

== Applied research ==
Despite his basic research in brain function and form evolution, Vico's interest has been mainly focused on the applicability of the results. His research projects with industry included knee replacement surgery.

=== Artificial creativity ===
An early research project with Alcatel in the field of automating industrial design resulted in his most cited paper. A decade later, Vico led the Melomics project, which was a milestone in the application of artificial intelligence to computer music. This research produced Iamus, a computer cluster for automated composition, which composed music that was recorded in the album Iamus, and a piece interpreted by the London Symphony Orchestra, described by New Scientist as "The first major work composed by a computer and performed by a full orchestra." For its disruptive novelty in the artistic and technological disciplines, Melomics was acknowledged as one of the scientific contributions of 2012 by Discover magazine. It also found applications in health, and was presented in the Seoul Digital Forum in 2015.

=== Educational technologies ===
Since 2015, Vico's activity has focused on educational technologies. ToolboX is a programming environment developed by Vico that adapts modern computer technology to coding education.

=== Games ===
Vico has also designed Selfo, a connection board game.
