= Computational creativity =

Multidisciplinary endeavour

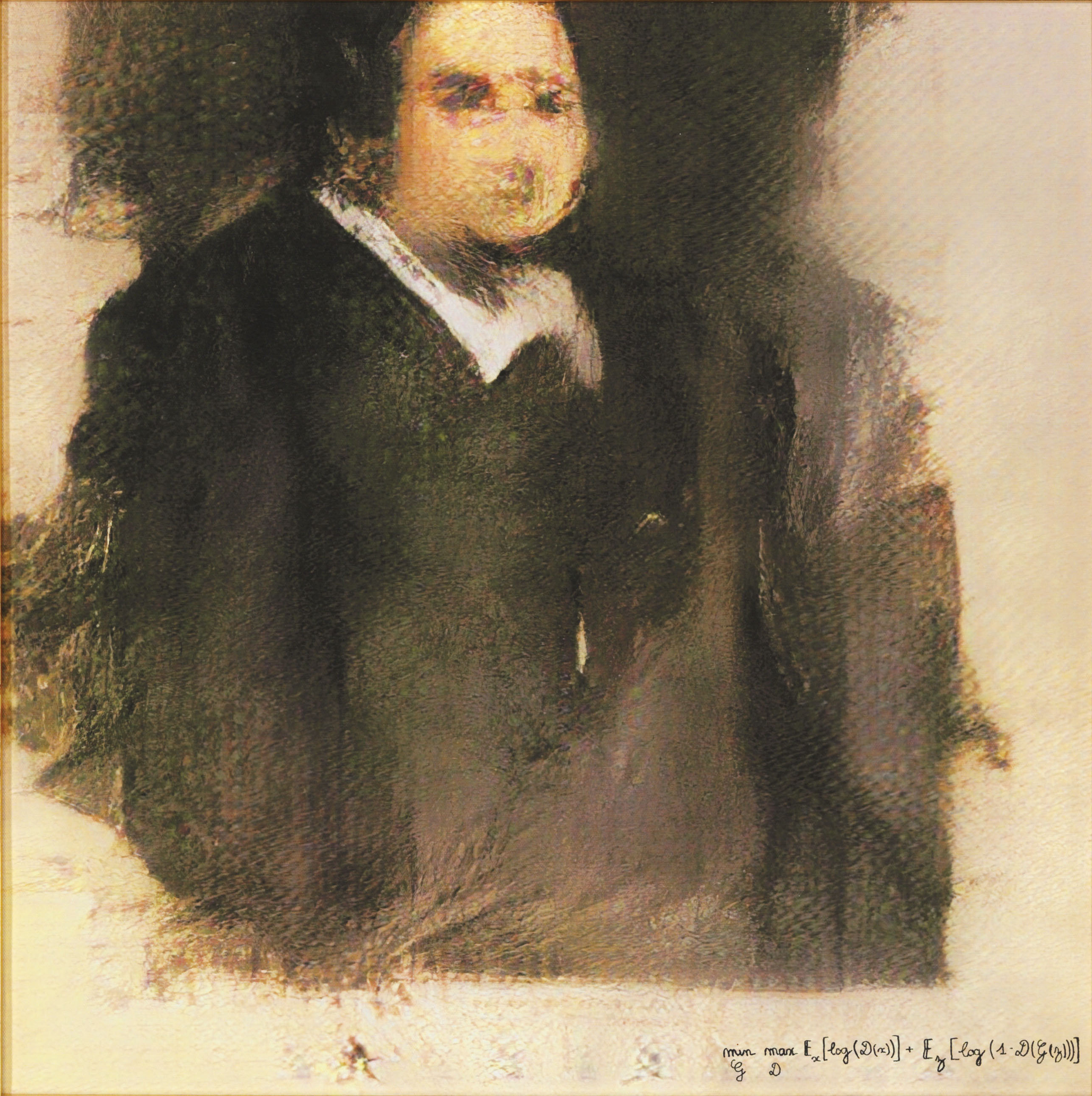
Edmond de Belamy, an artwork generated by a generative adversarial network and sold in 2018 for $432,500

Computational creativity (also known as artificial creativity, mechanical creativity, creative computing or creative computation) is a multidisciplinary endeavour that is located at the intersection of the fields of artificial intelligence, cognitive psychology, philosophy, and the arts (e.g., computational art as part of computational culture).

Is the application of computer systems to emulate human-like creative processes, facilitating the generation of artistic and design outputs that mimic innovation and originality.

The goal of computational creativity is to model, simulate or replicate creativity using a computer, to achieve one of several ends:

- To construct a program or computer capable of human-level creativity.
- To better understand human creativity and to formulate an algorithmic perspective on creative behavior in humans.
- To design programs that can enhance human creativity without necessarily being creative themselves.

The field of computational creativity concerns itself with theoretical and practical issues in the study of creativity. Theoretical work on the nature and proper definition of creativity is performed in parallel with practical work on the implementation of systems that exhibit creativity, with one strand of work informing the other.

The applied form of computational creativity is known as media synthesis.

== Theoretical issues ==
Theoretical approaches concern the essence of creativity. Especially, under what circumstances it is possible to call the model a "creative" if eminent creativity is about rule-breaking or the disavowal of convention. This is a variant of Ada Lovelace's objection to machine intelligence, as recapitulated by modern theorists such as Teresa Amabile. If a machine can do only what it was programmed to do, how can its behavior ever be called creative?

Indeed, not all computer theorists would agree with the premise that computers can only do what they are programmed to do—a key point in favor of computational creativity.

== Defining creativity in computational terms ==
Because no single perspective or definition seems to offer a complete picture of creativity, the AI researchers Newell, Shaw and Simon developed the combination of novelty and usefulness into the cornerstone of a multi-pronged view of creativity, one that uses the following four criteria to categorize a given answer or solution as creative:

1. The answer is novel and useful (either for the individual or for society)
2. The answer demands that we reject ideas we had previously accepted
3. The answer results from intense motivation and persistence
4. The answer comes from clarifying a problem that was originally vague

Margaret Boden focused on the first two of these criteria, arguing instead that creativity (at least when asking whether computers could be creative) should be defined as "the ability to come up with ideas or artifacts that are new, surprising, and valuable".

Mihaly Csikszentmihalyi argued that creativity had to be considered instead in a social context, and his DIFI (Domain-Individual-Field Interaction) framework has since strongly influenced the field. In DIFI, an individual produces works whose novelty and value are assessed by the field—other people in society—providing feedback and ultimately adding the work, now deemed creative, to the domain of societal works from which an individual might be later influenced.

Whereas the above reflects a top-down approach to computational creativity, an alternative thread has developed among bottom-up computational psychologists involved in artificial neural network research. During the late 1980s and early 1990s, for example, such generative neural systems were driven by genetic algorithms. Experiments involving recurrent nets were successful in hybridizing simple musical melodies and predicting listener expectations.

== Historical evolution of computational creativity ==
The use computational processes to generate creative artifacts has been present from early times in history. During the late 1800's, methods for composing music combinatorily were explored, involving prominent figures like Mozart, Bach, Haydn, and Kiernberger. This approach extended to analytical endeavors as early as 1934, where simple mechanical models were built to explore mathematical problem solving. Professional interest in the creative aspect of computation also was commonly addressed in early discussions of artificial intelligence. The 1956 Dartmouth Conference, listed creativity, invention, and discovery as key goals for artificial intelligence.

As the development of computers allowed systems of greater complexity, the 1970's and 1980's saw invention of early systems that modelled creativity using symbolic or rule-based approaches. The field of creative storytelling investigated several such models. Meehan's TALE-SPIN (1977) generated narratives through simulation of character goals and decision trees. Dehn's AUTHOR (1981) approached generation by simulating an author's process for crafting a story. Beyond narrative generation, computational creativity expanded into artistic and scientific domains.

Artistic image generation was one of the disciplines that saw early potential in generated artifacts through computational creativity. One of the most prominent examples was Harold Cohen's AARON, which produced art through composition and adaptation of figures based on a large set of symbolic rules and heuristics for visual composition. Some systems also tackled creativity in scientific endeavors. BACON was said to rediscover natural laws like Boyle's Law and Kepler's law through hypothesis testing in constrained spaces.

By the 1990's the modeling techniques became more adaptive, attempting to implement cognitive creative rules for generation. Turner's MINSTREL (1993) introduced TRAMs (Transform Recall Adapt Methods) to simulate creative re-use of prior material for generative storytelling. Meanwhile, Pérez y Pérez's MEXICA (1999) modeled the creative writing process using cycles of engagement and reflection. As systems increasingly incorporated models of internal evaluation, another approach that emerged was that of combining symbolic generation with domain-specific evaluation metrics, modeling generative and selective steps to creativity

In the field of generational humor, the JAPE system (1994) generated pun-based riddles using Prolog and WordNet, applying symbolic pattern-matching rules and a large lexical database (WordNet) to compose riddles involving wordplay. WordNet is a system developed by George Miller and his team at Princeton, its platform and inspired word-mapping structures have been used as the backbone of several syntactic and semantic AI programs. A notable system for music generation was David Cope's EMI (Experiments in Musical Intelligence) or Emmy, which was trained in the styles of artists like Bach, Beethoven, or Chopin and generated novel pieces in their style through pattern abstraction and recomposition.

In the 2000s and beyond, machine learning began influencing creative system design. Researchers such as Mihalcea and Strapparava trained classifiers to distinguish humorous from non-humorous text, using stylistic and semantic features. Meanwhile custom computational approaches led to chess systems like Deep Blue generating quasi-creative gameplay strategies through search algorithms and parallel processing constrained by specific rules and patterns for evaluation.

The institutional development of computational creativity grew along its technical advances. Dedicated workshops such as the IJWCC emerged in the 1990s, growing out of interdisciplinary conferences focused on AI and creativity. By the early 2000s, the field coalesced around annual conferences like the International Conference on Computational Creativity (ICCC). Recently, with the advent of Deep Learning, Transformers, and further refinement in Machine Learning structures, computational creativity's implementation space has new tools for development.

== Machine learning for computational creativity ==
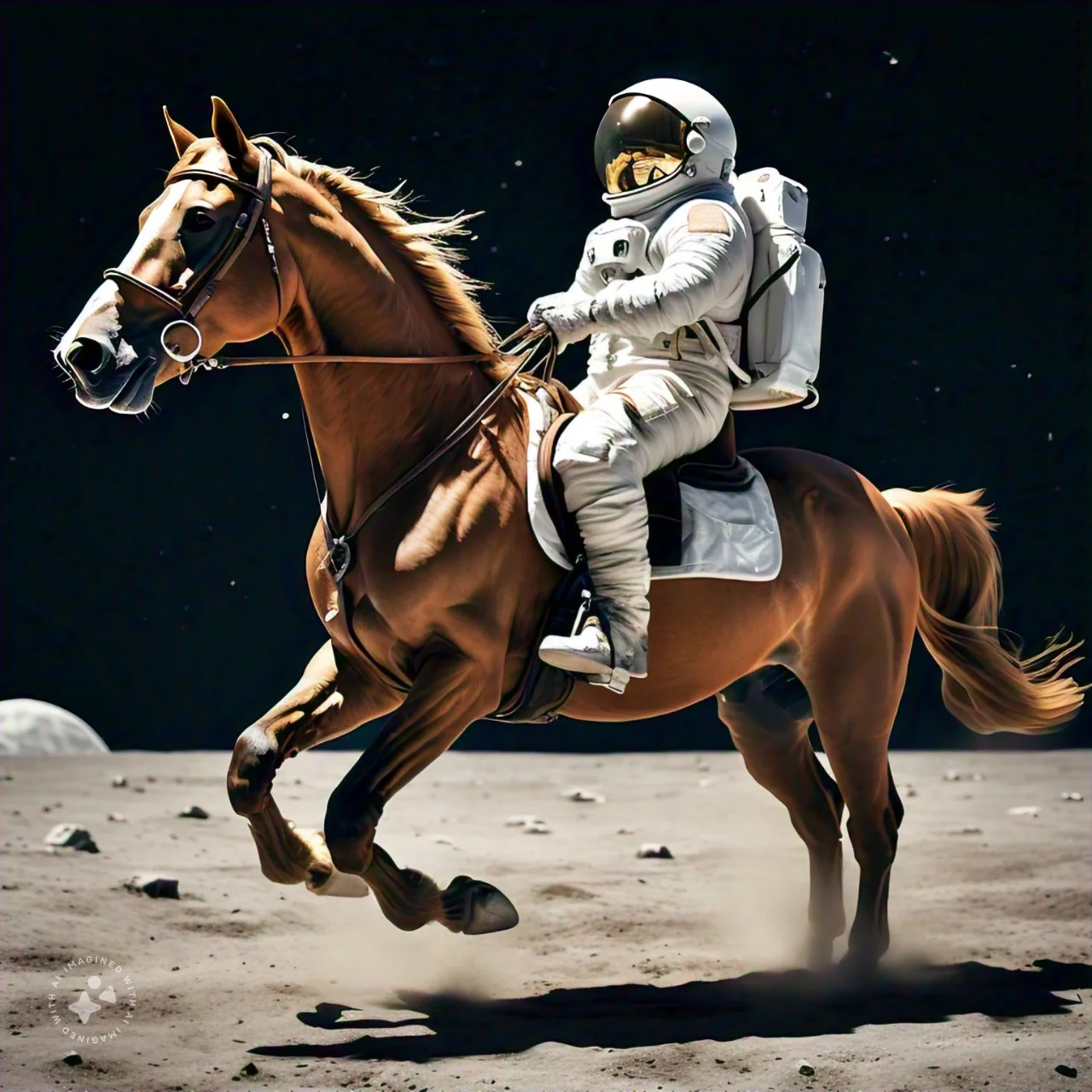
An image generated by a text-to-image model with the prompt photograph of an astronaut riding a horse on moon

While traditional computational approaches to creativity rely on the explicit formulation of prescriptions by developers and a certain degree of randomness in computer programs, machine learning methods allow computer programs to learn on heuristics from input data enabling creative capacities within the computer programs. Especially, deep artificial neural networks allow to learn patterns from input data that allow for the non-linear generation of creative artefacts. Before 1989, artificial neural networks have been used to model certain aspects of creativity. Peter Todd (1989) first trained a neural network to reproduce musical melodies from a training set of musical pieces. Then he used a change algorithm to modify the network's input parameters. The network was able to randomly generate new music in a highly uncontrolled manner. In 1992, Todd extended this work, using the so-called distal teacher approach that had been developed by Paul Munro, Paul Werbos, D. Nguyen and Bernard Widrow, Michael I. Jordan and David Rumelhart. In the new approach, there are two neural networks, one of which is supplying training patterns to another. In later efforts by Todd, a composer would select a set of melodies that define the melody space, position them on a 2-d plane with a mouse-based graphic interface, and train a connectionist network to produce those melodies, and listen to the new "interpolated" melodies that the network generates corresponding to intermediate points in the 2-d plane.

=== Language models and hallucination ===
Language models like GPT and LSTM are used to generate texts for creative purposes, such as novels and scripts. These models demonstrate hallucination from time to time, where erroneous materials are presented as factual. Creators make use of their hallucinatory tendency to capture unintended results. Ross Goodwin's 1 the Road, for example, uses an LSTM model trained on literature corpora to generate a novel that refers to Jack Kerouac's On the Road based on multimodal input captured by a camera, a microphone, a laptop's inner clock, and a GPS throughout the road trip. Brian Merchant commented on the novel as "pixelated poetry in its ragtag assemblage of modern American imagery". Oscar Sharp and Ross Goodwin created the experimental sci-fi short film Sunspring in 2016, written with an LSTM model, trained on their scripts and 1980-1990 sci-fi movies. Rodica Gotca critiqued their overall lack of focus on the narrative and intention to create based on the background of human culture.

Nevertheless, researchers highlight the positive side of language models' hallucination for generating novel solutions, given that the correctness and consistency of the response could be controlled. Jiang et al. propose the divergence-convergence flow model for harnessing the hallucinatory effects. They summarize the types of such effects in current research into factuality hallucinations and faithfulness hallucinations, which can be divided into smaller classes like factual fabrication and instruction inconsistency. While the divergence stage involves generating potentially hallucinatory content, the convergence stage focuses on filtering the hallucinations that are useful for the user with intent recognition and evaluation metrics.

== Key concepts from literature ==
Some high-level and philosophical themes recur throughout the field of computational creativity, for example as follows.

=== Important categories of creativity ===
Margaret Boden refers to creativity that is novel merely to the agent that produces it as "P-creativity" (or "psychological creativity"), and refers to creativity that is recognized as novel by society at large as "H-creativity" (or "historical creativity").

=== Exploratory and transformational creativity ===
Boden also distinguishes between the creativity that arises from an exploration within an established conceptual space, and the creativity that arises from a deliberate transformation or transcendence of this space. She labels the former as exploratory creativity and the latter as transformational creativity, seeing the latter as a form of creativity far more radical, challenging, and rarer than the former. Following the criteria from Newell and Simon elaborated above, we can see that both forms of creativity should produce results that are appreciably novel and useful (criterion 1), but exploratory creativity is more likely to arise from a thorough and persistent search of a well-understood space (criterion 3) -- while transformational creativity should involve the rejection of some of the constraints that define this space (criterion 2) or some of the assumptions that define the problem itself (criterion 4). Boden's insights have guided work in computational creativity at a very general level, providing more an inspirational touchstone for development work than a technical framework of algorithmic substance. However, Boden's insights are also the subject of formalization, most notably in the work by Geraint Wiggins.

=== Generation and evaluation ===
The criterion that creative products should be novel and useful means that creative computational systems are typically structured into two phases, generation and evaluation. In the first phase, novel (to the system itself, thus P-Creative) constructs are generated; unoriginal constructs that are already known to the system are filtered at this stage. This body of potentially creative constructs is then evaluated, to determine which are meaningful and useful and which are not. This two-phase structure conforms to the Geneplore model of Finke, Ward and Smith, which is a psychological model of creative generation based on empirical observation of human creativity.

Jordanous and Keller emphasize the need for a "tractable and well-articulated model of creativity". They extracted 694 creativity words derived from a corpus of empirical studies in psychology and creativity research spanning 60 years and clustered them based on lexical similarity. As a result, they identify 14 key components of creativity, which form the basis of the framework "Standardised Procedure for Evaluating Creative Systems" (SPECS). These components include aspects like "dealing with uncertainty", "independence and freedom", "social interaction and communication", and "spontaneity & subconscious processing".

=== Co-creation ===
While much of computational creativity research focuses on independent and automatic machine-based creativity generation, many researchers are inclined towards a collaboration approach. This human-computer interaction is sometimes categorized under the creativity support tools development. These systems aim to provide an ideal framework for research, integration, decision-making, and idea generation. Recently, deep learning approaches to imaging, sound and natural language processing, resulted in the modeling of productive creativity development frameworks.

=== Innovation ===
Computational creativity is increasingly being discussed in the innovation and management literature as the recent development in AI may disrupt entire innovation processes and fundamentally change how innovations will be created. Philip Hutchinson highlights the relevance of computational creativity for creating innovation and introduced the concept of "self-innovating artificial intelligence" (SAI) to describe how companies make use of AI in innovation processes to enhance their innovative offerings. SAI is defined as the organizational utilization of AI with the aim of incrementally advancing existing or developing new products, based on insights from continuously combining and analyzing multiple data sources. As AI becomes a general-purpose technology, the spectrum of products to be developed with SAI will broaden from simple to increasingly complex. This implies that computational creativity leads to a shift of creativity-related skills for humans.

Veale and Pérez y Pérez consider "optimal innovation" proposed by Giora et al. a useful foundation for developing computational creativity. Giora et al.'s experiment asks participants to do pleasure and familiarity ratings of verbal stimuli (e.g., body and soul vs. body and sole) and non-verbal stimuli (e.g., a peace dove vs. a peace dove vertically posed that looks like a waving hand). It reveals that pleasing stimuli need to be innovative while preserving the salient meaning of the literal form. Veale and Pérez y Pérez highlight the need to develop computational systems that capture how meaning changes due to formal changes.

=== Combinatorial creativity ===
A great deal, perhaps all, of human creativity can be understood as a novel combination of pre-existing ideas or objects. Common strategies for combinatorial creativity include:

- Placing a familiar object in an unfamiliar setting (e.g., Marcel Duchamp's Fountain) or an unfamiliar object in a familiar setting (e.g., a fish-out-of-water story such as The Beverly Hillbillies)
- Blending two superficially different objects or genres (e.g., a sci-fi story set in the Wild West, with robot cowboys, as in Westworld, or the reverse, as in Firefly; Japanese haiku poems, etc.)
- Comparing a familiar object to a superficially unrelated and semantically distant concept (e.g., "Makeup is the Western burka"; "A zoo is a gallery with living exhibits")
- Adding a new and unexpected feature to an existing concept (e.g., adding a scalpel to a Swiss Army knife; adding a camera to a mobile phone)
- Compressing two incongruous scenarios into the same narrative to get a joke (e.g., the Emo Philips joke "Women are always using men to advance their careers. Damned anthropologists!")
- Using an iconic image from one domain in a domain for an unrelated or incongruous idea or product (e.g., using the Marlboro Man image to sell cars, or to advertise the dangers of smoking-related impotence).

The combinatorial perspective allows us to model creativity as a search process through the space of possible combinations. The combinations can arise from composition or concatenation of different representations, or through a rule-based or stochastic transformation of initial and intermediate representations. Genetic algorithms and neural networks can be used to generate blended or crossover representations that capture a combination of different inputs.

==== Conceptual blending ====
Mark Turner and Gilles Fauconnier propose a model called Conceptual Integration Networks that elaborates upon Arthur Koestler's ideas about creativity as well as work by Lakoff and Johnson, by synthesizing ideas from Cognitive Linguistic research into mental spaces and conceptual metaphors. Their basic model defines an integration network as four connected spaces:

- A first input space (contains one conceptual structure or mental space)
- A second input space (to be blended with the first input)
- A generic space of stock conventions and image-schemas that allow the input spaces to be understood from an integrated perspective
- A blend space in which a selected projection of elements from both input spaces are combined; inferences arising from this combination also reside here, sometimes leading to emergent structures that conflict with the inputs.

Fauconnier and Turner describe a collection of optimality principles that are claimed to guide the construction of a well-formed integration network. In essence, they see blending as a compression mechanism in which two or more input structures are compressed into a single blend structure. This compression operates on the level of conceptual relations. For example, a series of similarity relations between the input spaces can be compressed into a single identity relationship in the blend.

Some computational success has been achieved with the blending model by extending pre-existing computational models of analogical mapping that are compatible by virtue of their emphasis on connected semantic structures. In 2006, Francisco Câmara Pereira presented an implementation of blending theory that employs ideas both from symbolic AI and genetic algorithms to realize some aspects of blending theory in a practical form; his example domains range from the linguistic to the visual, and the latter most notably includes the creation of mythical monsters by combining 3-D graphical models.

=== AI-assisted writing as curation ===
One of the first attempts to provide a literary-theoretical framework for AI-assisted writing was undertaken by Luciano Floridi in 2025. In his model of 'Distant Writing', the author functions as a designer and curator who develops narrative structures rather than formulating text manually. Through iterative selection and 'Socratic maieutics' (prompting), the human directs the machine, thereby assuming full intellectual responsibility for the design of the resulting work. Floridi's framework has a pre-LLM antecedent in the visual arts: Nicolas Bourriaud's Postproduction (2002) had argued that artists increasingly function as programmers and navigators of pre-existing cultural material rather than as original creators — a logic that Floridi transfers, with substantial theoretical elaboration, to the context of AI-assisted literary production. Floridi's term 'distant writing' itself is coined in explicit analogy to Franco Moretti's 'distant reading' — understood in its later, computationally inflected sense — which had reframed literary analysis as the large-scale, algorithm-assisted study of textual corpora.

== Linguistic creativity ==
Language provides continuous opportunity for creativity, evident in the generation of novel sentences, phrasings, puns, neologisms, rhymes, allusions, sarcasm, irony, similes, metaphors, analogies, witticisms, and jokes. Native speakers of morphologically rich languages frequently create new word-forms that are easily understood, and some have found their way to the dictionary. The area of natural language generation has been well studied, but these creative aspects of everyday language have yet to be incorporated with any robustness or scale.

=== Hypothesis of creative patterns ===
In the seminal work of applied linguist Ronald Carter, he hypothesized two main creativity types involving words and word patterns: pattern-reforming creativity, and pattern-forming creativity. Pattern-reforming creativity refers to creativity by the breaking of rules, reforming and reshaping patterns of language often through individual innovation, while pattern-forming creativity refers to creativity via conformity to language rules rather than breaking them, creating convergence, symmetry and greater mutuality between interlocutors through their interactions in the form of repetitions.

=== Story generation ===
Substantial work has been conducted in this area of linguistic creation since the 1970s, with the development of James Meehan's TALE-SPIN system. TALE-SPIN viewed stories as narrative descriptions of a problem-solving effort, and created stories by first establishing a goal for the story's characters so that their search for a solution could be tracked and recorded. The MINSTREL system represents a complex elaboration of this basic approach, distinguishing a range of character-level goals in the story from a range of author-level goals for the story. Systems like Bringsjord's BRUTUS elaborate these ideas further to create stories with complex interpersonal themes like betrayal. Nonetheless, MINSTREL explicitly models the creative process with a set of Transform Recall Adapt Methods (TRAMs) to create novel scenes from old. The MEXICA model of Rafael Pérez y Pérez and Mike Sharples is more explicitly interested in the creative process of storytelling, and implements a version of the engagement-reflection cognitive model of creative writing.

=== Metaphor and simile ===
Example of a metaphor: "She was an ape."

Example of a simile: "Felt like a tiger-fur blanket." The computational study of these phenomena has mainly focused on interpretation as a knowledge-based process. Computationalists such as Yorick Wilks, James Martin, Dan Fass, John Barnden, and Mark Lee have developed knowledge-based approaches to the processing of metaphors, either at a linguistic level or a logical level. Tony Veale and Yanfen Hao have developed a system, called Sardonicus, that acquires a comprehensive database of explicit similes from the web; these similes are then tagged as bona-fide (e.g., "as hard as steel") or ironic (e.g., "as hairy as a bowling ball", "as pleasant as a root canal"); similes of either type can be retrieved on demand for any given adjective. They use these similes as the basis of an on-line metaphor generation system called Aristotle that can suggest lexical metaphors for a given descriptive goal (e.g., to describe a supermodel as skinny, the source terms "pencil", "whip", "whippet", "rope", "stick-insect" and "snake" are suggested).

=== Analogy ===
The process of analogical reasoning has been studied from both a mapping and a retrieval perspective, the latter being key to the generation of novel analogies. The dominant school of research, as advanced by Dedre Gentner, views analogy as a structure-preserving process; this view has been implemented in the structure mapping engine or SME, the MAC/FAC retrieval engine (Many Are Called, Few Are Chosen), ACME (Analogical Constraint Mapping Engine) and ARCS (Analogical Retrieval Constraint System). Other mapping-based approaches include Sapper, which situates the mapping process in a semantic-network model of memory. Analogy is a very active sub-area of creative computation and creative cognition; active figures in this sub-area include Douglas Hofstadter, Paul Thagard, and Keith Holyoak. Also worthy of note here is Peter Turney and Michael Littman's machine learning approach to the solving of SAT-style analogy problems; their approach achieves a score that compares well with average scores achieved by humans on these tests.

=== Joke generation ===
Humour is an especially knowledge-hungry process, and the most successful joke-generation systems to date have focused on pun-generation, as exemplified by the work of Kim Binsted and Graeme Ritchie. This work includes the JAPE system, which can generate a wide range of puns that are consistently evaluated as novel and humorous by young children. An improved version of JAPE has been developed in the guise of the STANDUP system, which has been experimentally deployed as a means of enhancing linguistic interaction with children with communication disabilities. Some limited progress has been made in generating humour that involves other aspects of natural language, such as the deliberate misunderstanding of pronominal reference (in the work of Hans Wim Tinholt and Anton Nijholt), as well as in the generation of humorous acronyms in the HAHAcronym system of Oliviero Stock and Carlo Strapparava.

=== Neologism ===
The blending of multiple word forms is a dominant force for new word creation in language; these new words are commonly called "blends" or "portmanteau words" (after Lewis Carroll). Tony Veale has developed a system called ZeitGeist that harvests neological headwords from Wikipedia and interprets them relative to their local context in Wikipedia and relative to specific word senses in WordNet. ZeitGeist has been extended to generate neologisms of its own; the approach combines elements from an inventory of word parts that are harvested from WordNet, and simultaneously determines likely glosses for these new words (e.g., "food traveller" for "gastronaut" and "time traveller" for "chrononaut"). It then uses Web search to determine which glosses are meaningful and which neologisms have not been used before; this search identifies the subset of generated words that are both novel ("H-creative") and useful.

A corpus linguistic approach to the search and extraction of neologism have also shown to be possible. Using Corpus of Contemporary American English as a reference corpus, Locky Law has performed an extraction of neologism, portmanteaus and slang words using the hapax legomena which appeared in the scripts of American TV drama House M.D.

In terms of linguistic research in neologism, Stefan Th. Gries has performed a quantitative analysis of blend structure in English and found that "the degree of recognizability of the source words and that the similarity of source words to the blend plays a vital role in blend formation." The results were validated through a comparison of intentional blends to speech-error blends.

=== Poetry ===
More than iron, more than lead, more than gold I need electricity.
I need it more than I need lamb or pork or lettuce or cucumber.
I need it for my dreams.

— Racter, from The Policeman's Beard Is Half Constructed

Like jokes, poems involve a complex interaction of different constraints, and no general-purpose poem generator adequately combines the meaning, phrasing, structure and rhyme aspects of poetry. Nonetheless, Pablo Gervás has developed a noteworthy system called ASPERA that employs a case-based reasoning (CBR) approach to generating poetic formulations of a given input text via a composition of poetic fragments that are retrieved from a case-base of existing poems. Each poem fragment in the ASPERA case-base is annotated with a prose string that expresses the meaning of the fragment, and this prose string is used as the retrieval key for each fragment. Metrical rules are then used to combine these fragments into a well-formed poetic structure. Racter is an example of such a software project. LLMs have been applied to poetry since the late 2010s. In Autumn 2020, The Poetry Review (ISSN 0032-2156) published Ariel Klein's "50% Human: A poetic interview with AI agents", an LLM-generated/assisted poetic feature and an early verified instance of LLM poetry in a major literary magazine; subsequent trade publications such as K. Allado-McDowell's Pharmako-AI (2020) and I Am Code: An Artificial Intelligence Speaks: Poems (2023) brought LLM-authored verse to wider audiences.

== Musical creativity ==
Computational creativity in the music domain has focused both on the generation of musical scores for use by human musicians, and on the generation of music for performance by computers. The domain of generation has included classical music (with software that generates music in the style of Mozart and Bach) and jazz. Most notably, David Cope has written a software system called "Experiments in Musical Intelligence" (or "EMI") that is capable of analyzing and generalizing from existing music by a human composer to generate novel musical compositions in the same style. EMI's output is convincing enough to persuade human listeners that its music is human-generated to a high level of competence.

In the field of contemporary classical music, Iamus is the first computer that composes from scratch, and produces final scores that professional interpreters can play. The London Symphony Orchestra played a piece for full orchestra, included in Iamus' debut CD, which New Scientist described as "The first major work composed by a computer and performed by a full orchestra". Melomics, the technology behind Iamus, is able to generate pieces in different styles of music with a similar level of quality.

Creativity research in jazz has focused on the process of improvisation and the cognitive demands that this places on a musical agent: reasoning about time, remembering and conceptualizing what has already been played, and planning ahead for what might be played next. The robot Shimon, developed by Gil Weinberg of Georgia Tech, has demonstrated jazz improvisation. Virtual improvisation software based on researches on stylistic modeling carried out by Gerard Assayag and Shlomo Dubnov include OMax, SoMax and PyOracle, are used to create improvisations in real-time by re-injecting variable length sequences learned on the fly from the live performer.

In the field of musical composition, the patented works by René-Louis Baron allowed to make a robot that can create and play a multitude of orchestrated melodies, so-called "coherent" in any musical style. All outdoor physical parameter associated with one or more specific musical parameters, can influence and develop each of these songs (in real-time while listening to the song). The patented invention Medal-Composer raises problems of copyright.

== Visual and artistic creativity ==
Computational creativity in the generation of visual art has had some notable successes in the creation of both abstract art and representational art. A well-known program in this domain is Harold Cohen's AARON, which has been continuously developed and augmented since 1973. Though formulaic, Aaron exhibits a range of outputs, generating black-and-white drawings or colour paintings that incorporate human figures (such as dancers), potted plants, rocks, and other elements of background imagery. These images are of a sufficiently high quality to be displayed in reputable galleries.

Other software artists of note include the NEvAr system (for "Neuro-Evolutionary Art") of Penousal Machado. NEvAr uses a genetic algorithm to derive a mathematical function that is then used to generate a coloured three-dimensional surface. A human user is allowed to select the best pictures after each phase of the genetic algorithm, and these preferences are used to guide successive phases, thereby pushing NEvAr's search into pockets of the search space that are considered most appealing to the user.

The Painting Fool, developed by Simon Colton originated as a system for overpainting digital images of a given scene in a choice of different painting styles, colour palettes and brush types. Given its dependence on an input source image to work with, the earliest iterations of the Painting Fool raised questions about the extent of, or lack of, creativity in a computational art system. Nonetheless, The Painting Fool has been extended to create novel images, much as AARON does, from its own limited imagination. Images in this vein include cityscapes and forests, which are generated by a process of constraint satisfaction from some basic scenarios provided by the user (e.g., these scenarios allow the system to infer that objects closer to the viewing plane should be larger and more color-saturated, while those further away should be less saturated and appear smaller). Artistically, the images now created by the Painting Fool appear on a par with those created by Aaron, though the extensible mechanisms employed by the former (constraint satisfaction, etc.) may well allow it to develop into a more elaborate and sophisticated painter.

The artist Krasi Dimtch (Krasimira Dimtchevska) and the software developer Svillen Ranev have created a computational system combining a rule-based generator of English sentences and a visual composition builder that converts sentences generated by the system into abstract art. The software generates automatically indefinite number of different images using different color, shape and size palettes. The software also allows the user to select the subject of the generated sentences or/and the one or more of the palettes used by the visual composition builder.

An emerging area of computational creativity is that of video games. ANGELINA is a system for creatively developing video games in Java by Michael Cook. One important aspect is Mechanic Miner, a system that can generate short segments of code that act as simple game mechanics. ANGELINA can evaluate these mechanics for usefulness by playing simple unsolvable game levels and testing to see if the new mechanic makes the level solvable. Sometimes Mechanic Miner discovers bugs in the code and exploits these to make new mechanics for the player to solve problems with.

In July 2015, Google released DeepDream – an open source computer vision program, created to detect faces and other patterns in images with the aim of automatically classifying images, which uses a convolutional neural network to find and enhance patterns in images via algorithmic pareidolia, thus creating a dreamlike psychedelic appearance in the deliberately over-processed images.

In August 2015, researchers from Tübingen, Germany created a convolutional neural network that uses neural representations to separate and recombine content and style of arbitrary images which is able to turn images into stylistic imitations of works of art by artists such as a Picasso or Van Gogh in about an hour. Their algorithm is put into use in the website DeepArt that allows users to create unique artistic images by their algorithm.

In early 2016, a global team of researchers explained how a new computational creativity approach known as the Digital Synaptic Neural Substrate (DSNS) could be used to generate original chess puzzles that were not derived from endgame databases. The DSNS is able to combine features of different objects (e.g. chess problems, paintings, music) using stochastic methods in order to derive new feature specifications which can be used to generate objects in any of the original domains. The generated chess puzzles have also been featured on YouTube.

On February 3, 2026 during an interview with ABC News, Josh D'Amaro who succeeded Bob Iger as chief executive officer (CEO) of the Walt Disney Company on March 18, 2026, mentioned that AI will not replace human creativity during his tenure at the company, stating, "The reason this company is so special is because of how creative we are, and the human beings that are generating that creativity. In my mind, that never gets replaced." The following month, D'Amaro stated that "We'll continue to develop and embrace new technologies to empower our storytellers—but never at the expense of our characters and worlds, our creative partners, or the trust people place in us. We have the most creative, most passionate, dedicated people—and it's because of our people that we'll continue to create stories and experiences that our fans carry with them for a lifetime."

In July 17, 2026, Disney Jr. quietly dropped the AI animated series "Ozzy Fox" in their Youtube channel. The series was done by animation studio Animaj which has been vocal on using AI tools to create their productions. Animaj got funding from Disney's Accelator Program in 2025. According to Cartoon Brew, the series was launched with "no official press release or promotion, and we're told the companies want the launch to speak for itself."

== Creativity in problem solving ==
Creativity is also useful in allowing for unusual solutions in problem solving. In psychology and cognitive science, this research area is called creative problem solving. The Explicit-Implicit Interaction (EII) theory of creativity has been implemented using a CLARION-based computational model that allows for the simulation of incubation and insight in problem-solving. The emphasis of this computational creativity project is not on performance per se (as in artificial intelligence projects) but rather on the explanation of the psychological processes leading to human creativity and the reproduction of data collected in psychology experiments. So far, this project has been successful in providing an explanation for incubation effects in simple memory experiments, insight in problem solving, and reproducing the overshadowing effect in problem solving.

== Criticism of computational creativity ==
Traditional computers, as mainly used in the computational creativity application, do not support creativity, as they fundamentally transform a set of discrete, limited domain of input parameters into a set of discrete, limited domain of output parameters using a limited set of computational functions. As such, a computer cannot be creative, as everything in the output must have been already present in the input data or the algorithms. Related discussions and references to related work are captured in work on philosophical foundations of simulation.

Mathematically, the same set of arguments against creativity has been made by Chaitin. Similar observations come from a Model Theory perspective. All this criticism emphasizes that computational creativity is useful and may look like creativity, but it is not real creativity, as nothing new is created, just transformed in well-defined algorithms.

According to researchers like Mark Riedl, human creativity and computational creativity at their current state differ in several dimensions. While creativity can be viewed in the context of morality, Riedl considers the "educational, moralizing" aspect of stories as one of the challenges to developing narrative-generating AI models, which may contribute to the underlying reasoning coherence of the text. The lack of intention in AI models hinders them from making morally responsible choices, which often appear in human creativity.

Michele Loi and Eleonora Vigano identified some potential threats to human creativity caused by AI development. For example, they considered the openness to "experiments of life", introduced by John Stuart Mill, an important factor in creativity. Society's overreliance on algorithms for making decisions would constrain utility functions, which may discourage people from exploring riskier solutions and decrease the diversity of exploration and thus the creativity.

In November 2025, during the Walt Disney Company's Q4, Earnings Call, Bob Iger revealed that the company is working on user generated A.I. experiences and features for Disney+. The announcement was met with backlash in several social media platforms like Twitter and Instagram. The Owl House creator Dana Terrace spoke against Iger's announcement, calling him and the board of Disney executives "vultures" and to "pick up a pencil or die". Terrace would urge fans of her series to pirate the show as well to cancel their Disney+ subscriptions stating "I don't care".

== Events ==
The International Conference on Computational Creativity (ICCC) occurs annually, organized by The Association for Computational Creativity. Events in the series include:

- ICCC 2023: University of Waterloo in Ontario, Canada
- ICCC 2022: Free University of Bozen-Bolzano, Bolzano, Italy
- ICCC 2021: Mexico City, Mexico (Virtual due to COVID-19 pandemic)
- ICCC 2020, Coimbra, Portugal (Virtual due to COVID-19 pandemic)
- ICCC 2019, Charlotte, North Carolina, US
- ICCC 2018, Salamanca, Spain
- ICCC 2017, Atlanta, Georgia, US
- ICCC 2016, Paris, France
- ICCC 2015, Park City, Utah, US. Keynote: Emily Short
- ICCC 2014, Ljubljana, Slovenia. Keynote: Oliver Deussen
- ICCC 2013, Sydney, Australia. Keynote: Arne Dietrich
- ICCC 2012, Dublin, Ireland. Keynote: Steven Smith
- ICCC 2011, Mexico City, Mexico. Keynote: George E Lewis
- ICCC 2010, Lisbon, Portugal. Keynote/Invited Talks: Nancy J Nersessian and Mary Lou Maher

Previously, the community of computational creativity has held a dedicated workshop, the International Joint Workshop on Computational Creativity, every year since 1999. Previous events in this series include:

- IJWCC 2003, Acapulco, Mexico, as part of IJCAI'2003
- IJWCC 2004, Madrid, Spain, as part of ECCBR'2004
- IJWCC 2005, Edinburgh, UK, as part of IJCAI'2005
- IJWCC 2006, Riva del Garda, Italy, as part of ECAI'2006
- IJWCC 2007, London, UK, a stand-alone event
- IJWCC 2008, Madrid, Spain, a stand-alone event

The 1st Conference on Computer Simulation of Musical Creativity will be held

- CCSMC 2016, 17–19 June, University of Huddersfield, UK. Keynotes: Geraint Wiggins and Graeme Bailey.

== See also ==
- 1 the Road – Novel written by an artificial intelligence (1st novel)
- Artificial imagination – Artificial simulation of human imagination
- Algorithmic art – Art genre
- Algorithmic composition – Technique of using algorithms to create music
- Applications of artificial intelligence
- Computer art – Art genre
- Collective creativity – Ability to generate new ideas and solutions together in a creative process
- Creative computing – Computer science applied to the arts
- Digital morphogenesis – Type of generative art
- Digital poetry – Form of electronic literature
- Generative art – Art created by a set of rules, often using computers
- Generative systems – Technologies that can produce change driven by audiences
- Intrinsic motivation (artificial intelligence) – Mechanism for enabling artificial agents to exhibit curiosity
- Musikalisches Würfelspiel – Musical dice games used to randomly generate music (Musical dice game)
- Procedural generation – Method in which data is created algorithmically as opposed to manually

Lists

- List of emerging technologies
- Outline of artificial intelligence
