= Iamus (disambiguation) =

Iamus is a figure in Greek mythology.

Iamus may also refer to:

- Iamus (computer), a computer created by University of Malaga
- Iamus (album), a 2012 album composed by the Iamus computer
