= 0music =

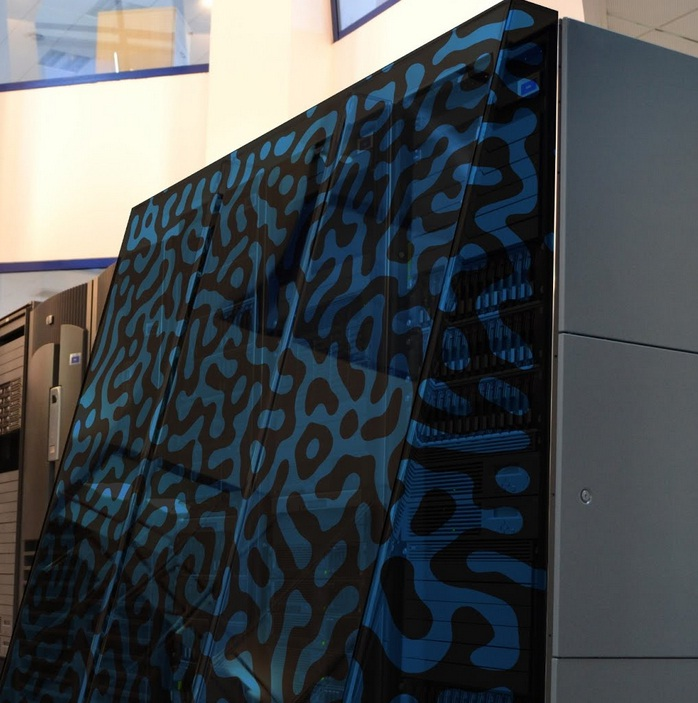

Studio album by Melomics109
- Released: 2014
- Recorded: Melomics109
- Genres: Symphonic, Minimalist, World, Electronic
- Length: 42:35

0music is the second album produced with Melomics technology. While the first one (Iamus' album) is a compilation of contemporary pieces fully composed by Iamus, 0music compiles pieces of popular genres, composed and interpreted without any human intervention by Melomics109, a computer cluster hosted at the University of Malaga. The pieces in this album, and all the production of Melomics109, is distributed under CC0 licensing, and it is available in audible and editable (MIDI) formats.

The album was launched during a one-day symposium held in Malaga on July 21, 2014.

== Track listing ==
| No. | Title | Music | MIDI | Length |
|---|---|---|---|---|
| 1. | "0music 01" | | | 2:10 |
| 2. | "0music 02" | | | 3:35 |
| 3. | "0music 03" | | | 3:50 |
| 4. | "0music 04" | | | 4:08 |
| 5. | "0music 05" | | | 2:32 |
| 6. | "0music 06" | | | 2:44 |
| 7. | "0music 07" | | | 5:11 |
| 8. | "0music 08" | | | 2:58 |
| 9. | "0music 09" | | | 2:33 |
| 10. | "0music 10" | | | 2:26 |
| 11. | "0music 11" | | | 3:25 |
| 12. | "0music 12" | | | 6:49 |

== See also ==
- 1 the Road
