= Melomics109 =

Music composition computer at Universidad de Málaga

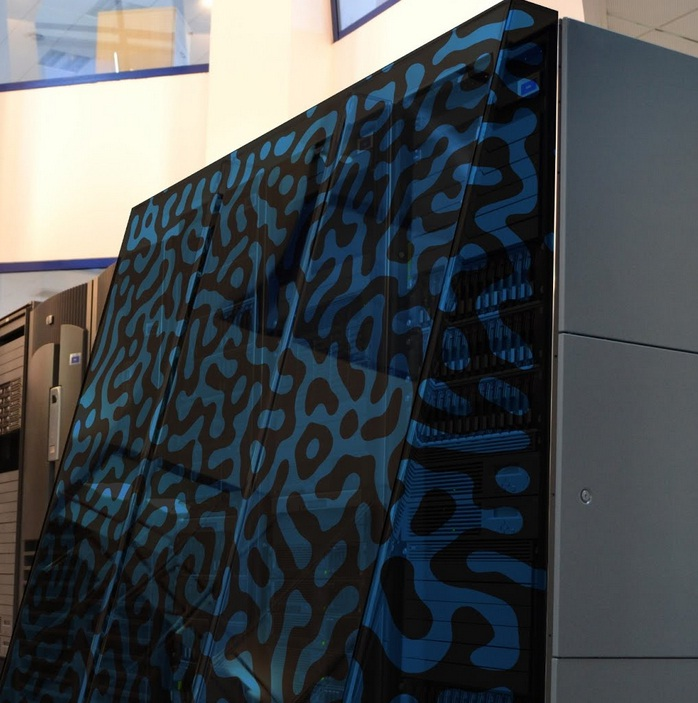
- Melomics109 computer cluster
- Active: Operational November 2013
- Location: Universidad de Málaga
- Architecture: 960 AMD processors, Debian Linux operating system
- Operating system: Debian Linux
- Memory: 3840 GB
- Storage: 320 TB
- Purpose: Composition of music

Melomics109 is a computer cluster located at Universidad de Málaga used to create digital music. It is part of the Spanish Supercomputing Network, and has been designed to increase the computational power provided by Iamus. Powered by Melomics' technology, the composing module of Melomics109 is able to create and synthesize music in a variety of musical styles. This music has been made freely accessible to everyone. The cluster consists of three cabinets with customized front panels.

== Album ==
0music is the first album composed and interpreted by Melomics109. It was launched in July 2014, and was released in audio (MP3) and editable format (MIDI), under CC0 (public domain) licensing.
