= Simon Colton =

British computer scientist

- Born: 1973 (age 52–53); Nottingham
- Education: Durham University (BSc); University of Liverpool (MSc); University of Edinburgh (PhD)
- Scientific career
- Fields: Computational creativity
- Workplaces: Imperial College, London; Goldsmiths, University of London; Queen Mary, University of London
- Thesis: Automated theory formation in pure mathematics (2001)
- Doctoral advisor: Alan Bundy and Toby Walsh

Simon Colton (born 1973) is an English computer scientist, currently working as Professor of Computational Creativity in the Game AI Research Group at Queen Mary University of London and in the Sensilab at Monash University, Australia.

He previously worked as Professor in the Metamakers Institute at Falmouth University, UK and led the Computational Creativity Research Groups at Goldsmiths, University of London and at Imperial College, London.

== Early life and education ==
Born in Nottingham, Colton graduated from the University of Durham in 1994 with a BSc degree in Mathematics. After a year spent as a programmer at a software company, he studied at the University of Liverpool, where he gained an MSc in Pure Mathematics in 1996. In 2000 he finished his PhD in Artificial Intelligence at the University of Edinburgh, having been supervised by Alan Bundy and Toby Walsh.

== Career ==
=== Overview ===
Colton stayed on as a Research Associate at the University of Edinburgh until 2002, at which point he moved to Imperial College, London as a lecturer in the Department of Computing. He was appointed Senior Lecturer in 2007 and then Reader in Computational Creativity in 2010. He was appointed Professor of Computational Creativity at Goldsmiths College in 2013 and joined Queen Mary, University of London in 2018.

=== The Painting Fool ===
Colton is the driving force behind thepaintingfool.com, an artificial intelligence that he hopes will one day be accepted as an artist in its own right. His work, along with that of Maja Pantić and Michel Valstar, won the British Computing Society Machine Intelligence Award in 2007. The work has also been the subject of some media attention.

Prior to his work on The Painting Fool, Colton worked on the HR tool, a reasoning tool that was applied to discover mathematical concepts. The system successfully discovered theorems and conjectures, some of which were novel enough to become published works. Colton's work with HM included the discovery of refactorable numbers, which appeared to be original but turned out to have been previously discovered.
