= Selfo =

Board game

Selfo is a class of abstract strategy board games subscribed to the category of connection games. It was designed by Prof. Francisco Vico and its name derives from the phenomenon of self-organization (increase in a system's organization without external guidance), since during the game the sets of pieces might flow in a coordinated way as they step on the board.

== Description ==
Despite its very simple definition (“group your set of pieces by moving in turns to adjacent cells”) complex self-organization processes take place during the game under concrete circumstances (a balanced distribution of pieces and players with a similar level of expertise), and is the result of abrupt and deep changes in the tactics. The particular values given to the traditional parameters that define a game (i.e. board tiling, size and initial position, or number of pieces and players) are not so relevant, and many variants have been found to meet the conditions for self-organization. The Selfo class of connection game is defined, instead, by the interrelations among parameters in order to favor self-organization. Subclasses of Selfo derive upon the move length (number of movements of a piece in a single turn to adjacent empty cells). In a generic Selfo-n game, a player can move one piece from 0 (passing on the turn) to n consecutive steps.

== Rules ==
In its simplest variant, Selfo-1 for two players, the rules are:

1. A board (preferably a hexagonal grid) and a number of pieces are chosen.
2. All black and white pieces are placed on the board before play, in an ordered or random arrangement which preserves a balanced position.
3. Colors are randomly assigned to the players.
4. Players move in turns, starting with black. On the first move, white may swap sets with black instead of moving.
5. On each turn, a player moves one of their pieces to an adjacent empty cell.
6. The first player to arrange all of their pieces into a single connected group wins.
7. Players may agree to a draw, for example if the game lasts too long or some pieces become isolated.

== Implementations ==
Several algorithms has been designed to play Selfo close to human level, and an implementation is publicly accessible. Also a web-based implementation is available.
