= Hello World! (composition) =

"Hello World!" score

"Hello World!" is a piece of contemporary classical music for clarinet-violin-piano trio produced by the Iamus computer in September 2011. It is arguably the first full-scale work entirely composed by a computer without any human intervention and automatically written in a fully-fledged score using conventional musical notation. Iamus generates music scores in PDF and the MusicXML format that can be imported in professional editors such as Sibelius and Finale.

== Title ==
The title makes reference to the computer program Hello World, which is traditionally used to teach the most essential aspects in a programming language.

== Dedication ==
The composition is dedicated to the memory of Raymond Scott, an electronic music pioneer and inventor of the Electronium.

== Premiere ==
"Hello World!" was given its premiere performance on October 15, 2011, by Trio Energio at the Keroxen music festival in Santa Cruz de Tenerife, Spain. The performers were Cristo Barrios (clarinet), Cecilia Bercovich (violin), and Gustavo Díaz-Jerez (piano).

== Reception ==
As supported by neuroscientific studies, critiques of "Hello World!" (and similarly created works) could potentially be affected by anti-computer prejudice, derived from the fact of knowing in advance (or not) the non-human nature of the author. The music critic Tom Service of The Guardian acknowledged as much in his review of a 2012 performance, writing, "Now, maybe I'm falling victim to a perceptual bias against a faceless computer program but I just don't think Hello World! is especially impressive." He continued:

To me, it's precisely the musical "genomes", the backbone of the way Iamus programs and produces its pieces, that are the problem. It sounds like it's slavishly manipulating pitch cells to generate melodies that have a kind of superficial coherence and relationship to one another, with all the dryness and greyness that suggests, despite the expressive commitment of the three performers. But the material of Hello World! (there's no equivalent of the humorous exclamation mark in the music, more's the pity) is so unmemorable, and the way it's elaborated so workaday, that the piece leaves no distinctive impression.

Despite describing the piece as "more successful than previous attempts to produce generic musical compositions from computers," he added, "The real paradox of Iamus is why it's being used to attempt to fool humanity in this way. If you've got a computer program of this sophistication, why bother trying to compose pieces that a human, and not a very good human at that – well, not a compositional genius anyway – could write? Why not use it to find new realms of sound, new kinds of musical ideas?"

Conversely, the musicologist Peter Russell was asked to review "Hello World!" for the BBC, based on a video of the live premiere, but he was not given any information about the composer. In his critique, Russell writes "on listening to this delightful piece of chamber music I could not bring myself to say that it would probably be more satisfying to read the score than listen to it. In fact after repeated hearings, I came to like it".

== See also ==
- Algorithmic composition
- Computer music
- Iamus computer
