= Melomics =

System for the automatic composition of music (

Melomics Media
- Company type: University spin-off, University of Málaga
- Available in: English
- Founded: 2012
- Area served: Worldwide
- Founder: Francisco Vico
- Industry: Music
- Services: on-line music; royalty-free music; music-based mobile apps
- Website: melomics.uma.es
- Advertising: None
- Registration: Optional
- Launched: July 2012
- Current status: Active

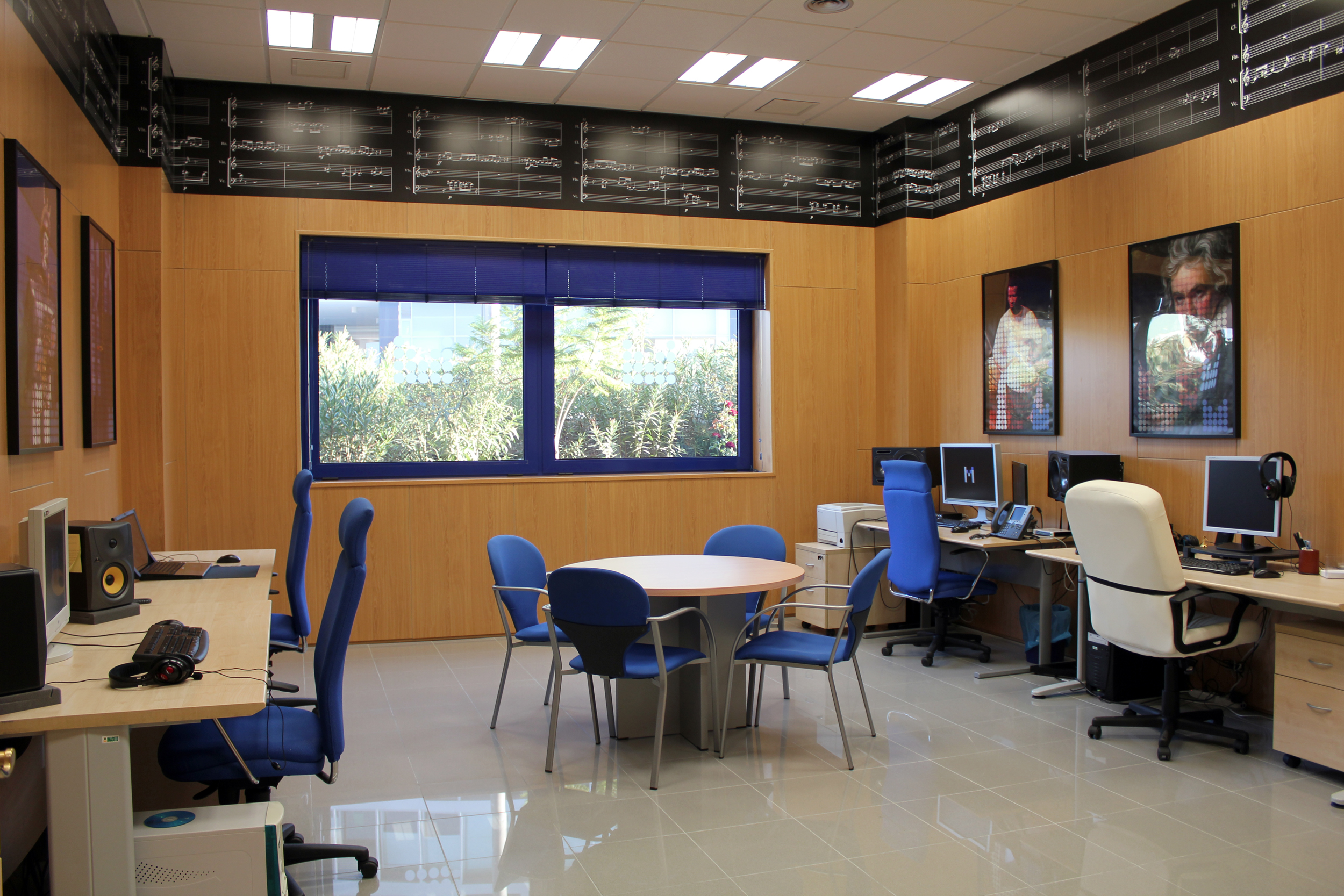
Melomics Media showroom at Andalusia Technology Park

Melomics (derived from "genomics of melodies") is a computational system for the automatic composition of music (with no human intervention), based on bioinspired algorithms.

== Technological aspects ==
Melomics applies an evolutionary approach to music composition, i.e., music pieces are obtained by simulated evolution. These themes compete to better adapt to a proper fitness function, generally grounded on formal and aesthetic criteria. The Melomics system encodes each theme in a genome, and the entire population of music pieces undergoes evo-devo dynamics (i.e., pieces read-out mimicking a complex embryological development process). The system is fully autonomous: once programmed, it composes music without human intervention.

This technology has been transferred to industry as an academic spin-off, Melomics Media, which has provided and reprogrammed a new computer cluster that created a huge collection of popular music. The results of this evolutionary computation are being stored in Melomics' site, which nowadays constitutes a vast repository of music content. A differentiating feature is that pieces are available in three types of formats: playable (MP3), editable (MIDI and MusicXML) and readable (score in PDF).

== Computer clusters ==
The Melomics computational system includes two computer clusters: Melomics109 and Iamus, dedicated to popular and artistic music, respectively.

=== Melomics109 cluster ===
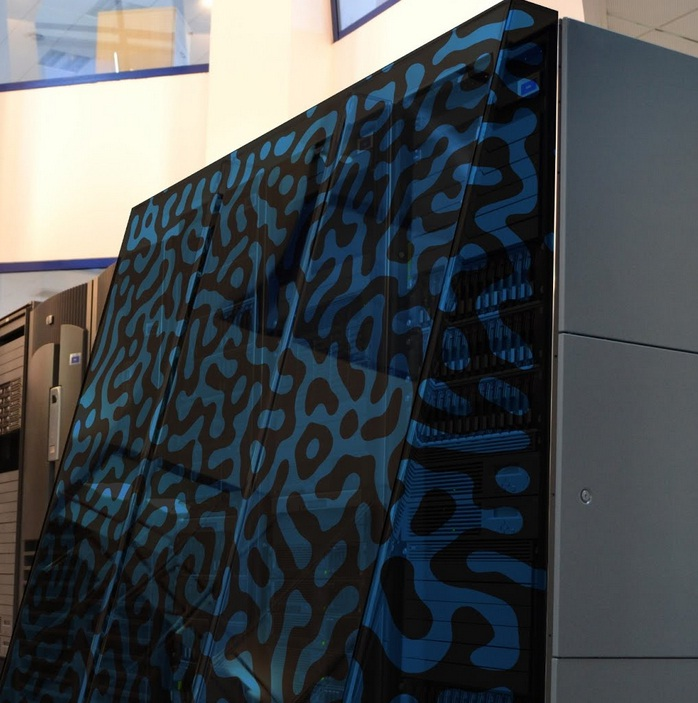
Melomics109

Melomics109 is cluster programmed and integrated in the Melomics system. Its first product is a vast repository of popular music compositions (roughly 1 billion), covering all essential styles. In addition to MP3, all songs are available in editable formats (MIDI); and music is licensed under CC0, meaning that it is freely downloadable.

0music is the first album published by Melomics109, which is available in MP3 and MIDI formats, under CC0 license.

It has been argued that, by making such amount of editable, original and royalty-free music accessible to people, Melomics may accelerate the process of commoditization of music, and change the way music is composed and consumed in the future.

=== Iamus album ===
In the first stages of the development of the Melomics system, Iamus composed Opus one (on October 15, 2010), arguably the first fragment of professional contemporary classical music ever composed by a computer in its own style, rather than attempting to emulate the style of existing composers. The first full composition (also in contemporary classic style), Hello World!, premiered exactly one year after the creation of Opus one, on October 15, 2011. Four later works premiered on July 2, 2012, and were broadcast live from the School of Computer Science at Universidad de Málaga as part of the events included in the Alan Turing year. The compositions performed at this event were before recorded at Real Conservatorio María Cristina, Málaga (Spain), March 2 to 3, 2012, and Angel Studios, London (UK) at April 14, 2012, by the London Symphony Orchestra, creating Iamus' eponymous first album, which New Scientist reported as the "first complete album to be composed solely by a computer and recorded by human musicians."

Commenting on the quality and authenticity of the music, Stephen Smoliar, critic of classical music at The San Francisco Examiner, commented "What is primary is the act of making the music itself engaged by the performers and how the listener responds to what those performers do... what is most interesting about the documents generated by Iamus is their capacity to challenge the creative talents of performing musicians".

== Applications ==
Melomics' empathic music has been tested in a number of therapeutic clinical trials, evidencing positive effects in reducing fear of heights, acute stress and pain perception. One of the studies resulted in a reduction of almost two thirds of pain perception in children undergoing a standard Skin Prick Test during allergy testing, as compared to the standard procedure. Some of these experiments made use of free mobile apps to adapt music to daily activity, such as jogging, or commuting, but also for therapeutic use, such as lessening stress before an exam, reducing chronic pain, insomnia, and to help children go to sleep.

Ongoing efforts to allow Melomics to adapt music in real-time to changes in the physiological state of the listener, and to music branding were also reported.
