= David Cope =

American composer and scientist (1941–2025)

- Born: May 17, 1941; San Francisco, California, U.S.
- Died: May 4, 2025 (aged 83); Santa Cruz, California, U.S.
- Occupations: Author, composer, scientist, professor
- Employer: University of California, Santa Cruz
- Known for: Research in artificial intelligence and music
- Notable work: EMI (Experiments in Musical Intelligence), Emily Howell
- Title: Dickerson Emeriti Professor of Music

David Howell Cope (May 17, 1941 – May 4, 2025) was an American author, composer, scientist and Dickerson Professor of Music at UC Santa Cruz. His primary area of research involved artificial intelligence and music; he wrote programs and algorithms that can analyze existing music and create new compositions in the style of the original input music. He taught the groundbreaking summer workshop in Workshop in Algorithmic Computer Music (WACM) that was open to the public as well as a general education course entitled Artificial Intelligence and Music for enrolled UCSC students. Cope was also co-founder and CTO Emeritus of Recombinant Inc., a music technology company. He died of congestive heart failure on May 4, 2025, at the age of 83.

== Composition ==
=== EMI ===
His EMI (Experiments in Musical Intelligence, pronounced "Emmy") software has produced works in the style of various composers, some of which have been commercially recorded—ranging from short pieces to full-length operas.

In 1981, he received a commission to compose an opera, but had a "composer's block", so he began writing EMI (on an Apple desktop computer) to understand and modify his own style, and 8 years after receiving the commission, managed to write the opera in 2 days with the help of EMI. Once it was done, he applied the same method to other composers like Bartok, Brahms, Chopin, Gershwin, Joplin, Mozart, and Prokoviev, resulting in a program that could compose in their styles as well. He then got an album published Bach By Design which was played by a Disklavier. The next album, Classical Music Composed by Computer, was played by humans.

Douglas Hofstadter developed a touring lecture about EMI, during the middle of which he would play two pieces, one a genuine Chopin piece, and one Chopin-style piece by EMI. The audience would then guess which is which, like in a Turing test. The audience could guess not better than random chance. In 2001, EMI consisted of 20,000 lines of Lisp code. In 2005, Cope deleted EMI’s music database, arguing that because EMI's compositions were "infinitely reproducible", they were devalued by critics.

=== Emily Howell ===
His subsequent "Emily Howell" program models musical creativity based on the types of creativity outlined by Margaret Boden in her book The Creative Mind: Myths and Mechanisms.

Emily Howell is a computer program featuring an interactive interface that "hears" feedback from listeners, and builds its own musical compositions from a source database, derived from Experiments in Musical Intelligence (EMI). Cope attempts to “teach” the program by providing feedback so that it can cultivate its own "personal" style. The software appears to be based on latent semantic analysis.

Emily Howell's first album was released in February 2009 by Centaur Records (CRC 3023). Titled From Darkness, Light, this album contains its Opus 1, Opus 2, and Opus 3 compositions for chamber orchestra and multiple pianos. Its second album Breathless was released in December 2012, also by Centaur Records (CRC 3255).

=== Personal compositions ===
In 1975, Cope composed a short piece on an IBM machine, using punched cards.

As a composer, Cope's own work encompassed a variety of styles—from the traditional to the avant-garde—and techniques, such as unconventional manners of playing, experimental musical instrument, and microtonal scales, including a 33-note system of just intonation he developed himself. Most recently, all of his original compositions have been written in collaboration with the computer—based on the input of his earlier works. He seeks synergy between composer creativity and computer algorithm as his principal creative direction.

== Bibliography ==
Cope published a wide range of books, which are often used as textbooks. New Directions in Music, first published in 1971, is currently in its 7th edition and is the standard text for contemporary music. In 2009, Cope was interviewed by the media in anticipation of the release of a CD containing music composed collaboratively by Cope and Emily Howell, a computer program.

Cope also published a series of detective novels under a pseudonym.

In 2022, Cope published the book Ethics of Computer-Assisted Music. Cope argues that just as there are differences in the application of ethics and morals among diverse cultures across society, there are similar ethical complexities that exist within the field of computer music.

=== Books ===
- Cope, David (1991). Computers and Musical Style. Madison, Wisconsin: A-R Editions.
- —— (1996). Experiments in Musical Intelligence. Madison, Wisconsin: A-R Editions.
- —— (1997). Techniques of the Contemporary Composer. New York City: Schirmer Books. ISBN 0-02-864737-8.
- —— (2000). New Directions in Music, 7th ed. Prospect Heights, Illinois: Waveland Press. ISBN 1-57766-108-7.
- —— (2000). The Algorithmic Composer. Madison, Wisconsin: A-R Editions.
- —— (2001). Virtual Music: Computer Synthesis of Musical Style. Cambridge, Massachusetts: The MIT Press. ISBN 0-262-53261-1.
- —— (2006). Computer Models of Musical Creativity. Cambridge, Massachusetts: MIT Press.
- —— (2008). Hidden Structure: Music Analysis Using Computers. Madison, Wisconsin: A-R Editions. ISBN 978-0-89579-640-0.
- —— (2012). A Musicianship Primer San Francisco. Epoc Books. ISBN 978-1-4776-8786-4.
- —— (2022). Cope, David (March 19, 2022). Ethics of Computer-Assisted Music. Coppell, Texas: Self-published. ISBN 979-8-4304-3236-2.

=== Chapters ===
- 1992. "A Computer Model of Music Composition." In Machine Models of Music, Stephan Schwanauer and David Levitt, eds.: MIT Press.
- 1992. "On the Algorithmic Representation of Musical Style." In Musical Intelligence, M. Balaban, K. Ebcioglu, and O. Laske, eds. : AAAI Press.
- 1998. "Signatures and Earmarks: Computer Recognition of Patterns in Music." In Melodic Similarity, Concepts, Procedures, and Applications. Walter B. Hewlett and Eleanor Selfridge-Field (eds.). Cambridge, Massachusetts: MIT Press.

=== Articles ===
- 1987. "Experiments in Music Intelligence." In Proceedings of the International Computer Music Conference, San Francisco: Computer Music Association.
- 1987. "An Expert System for Computer-Assisted Music Composition." Computer Music Journal 11,4 (Winter): 30–46.
- 1988. "Music and LISP." AI Expert 3,3 (March): 26–34.
- 1988. "Music: The Universal Language." In Proceedings of the First Workshop on AI and Music. Minneapolis/St. Paul, Minnesota: AAAI: 87–98.
- 1989. "Experiments in Musical Intelligence (EMI): Non-Linear Linguistic-based Composition." Interface, vol. 18: 117–139.
- 1990. "Pattern Matching as an Engine for the Computer Simulation of Musical Style." In Proceedings of the 1990 ICMC. San Fran Computer Music Association
- 1991. "Recombinant Music." COMPUTER. (July).
- 1991. "Computer Simulations of Musical Style." Computers in Music Research, The Queens University of Belfast, 7–10 (April): 15–17.
- 1992. "Computer Modeling of Musical Intelligence in Experiments in Musical Intelligence." Computer Music Journal 16,2 (Summer): 69–83.
- 1993. "Virtual Music." Electronic Musician, 9:5 (May): 80–85.
- 1996. "Mimesis du style et de la structure musicale." Symposium on Composition, Modelisation et Ordinateur. IRCAM, Paris: 21–23.
- 1997. "Composer's Underscoring Environment." In Proceedings of the International Computer Music Conference. San Fran: Computer Music Association.
- 1997. "The Composer's Underscoring Environment: CUE." Computer Music Journal 21/3 (Fall).
- 1999. "One Approach to Musical Intelligence." IEEE Intelligent Systems. Los Alamitos, California: IEEE Computer Society (14/3, May/June).
- 2000. "Facing the Music: Perspectives on Machine Composed Music." Leonardo Music Journal 9: 79–87.
- 2002. "Computer Analysis and Composition Using Atonal Voice-Leading Techniques." Perspectives of New Music 40/1 (Winter): 121–146.
- 2003. "Computer Analysis of Musical Allusions." Computer Music Journal 27/1: 11–28.
- 2004. "A Musical Learning Algorithm." Computer Music Journal 28/3: 12–27.
- 2006. "The Vivaldi Code" Wired, issue 14. September 9, 2006.

== Discography ==
- 1982. The Way. Opus One Records. Number 82.
- 1993. Bach by Design. Centaur Records. CRC 2184
- 1997. Classical Music Composed by Computer. Centaur Records. CRC 2329
- 1997. Virtual Mozart. Centaur Records. CRC 2452
- 1999. Towers. Vienna Modern Masters. VMM 2024
- 2003. Virtual Bach. Centaur Records. CRC 2619
- 2009. From Darkness, Light (Emily Howell). Centaur Records. CRC 3023
- 2011. Symphony No. 4. Epoc. B008J5IK78
- 2012. Symphony No. 5. Epoc. B008J5IFD2
- 2012. Symphony No. 9 "(Martin Luther King, Jr.)" Epoc. B008J5IGCW
- 2012. String Quartets 5 and 6. Epoc. B008O9RZTS
- 2012. Violin Concerto/Viola Concerto. Epoc. B008J5IGRC
- 2012. Cello Concerto/Octet for Strings. Epoc. B008K8VJM2
- 2012. Piano Concerto/Re-Birth/Transcendence. Epoc. B008PYPDUK

== See also ==
- Algorithmic composition
- Computer-generated music
- List of music software

== Sources ==
- Cockrell, Dale. 2001. "Cope, David (Howell)". The New Grove Dictionary of Music and Musicians, second edition, edited by Stanley Sadie and John Tyrrell. London: Macmillan Publishers.
- Cope, David. n.d. "Bibliography: Books, Articles, and CDs". David Cope's UCSC webpage; accessed March 26, 2015
