= Iamus (album) =

Studio album by Iamus
- Released: 2012
- Recorded: by London Symphony Orchestra with the Melomics Ensemble
- Genre: Contemporary Classical Music
- Length: 51:00
- Label: Melomics Records

Iamus is the first studio album composed using Iamus, a computer cluster designed by the University of Malaga which creates contemporary classical music. The pieces are composed using melomics computational system, and are entirely computer generated, with no human input.

== Overview ==
The compositions were composed using a genomic process which creates music and converts it to standard musical notation, to be utilized by live musicians for performance and editing.

Iamus is arguably the first complete album to be composed solely by a computer and recorded by human musicians. This has generated a controversial discussion about the nature of artistic expression not only in music, but in many performing and visual arts. Tom Service, in reference to the piece "Hello World!", stated, "Iamus's Hello World... ought to pose existential questions about the integrity of musical composition, to blow holes in the fallacy that every note a human composer writes comes from a wellspring of emotion and deep thought unique to our consciousness."

Philip Ball, prolific science author, has written a piece on the album in the interdisciplinary science journal Nature, about Iamus and its role with present methods of music composition.

== Track listing ==
No.	Title	Length
1.	"Tránsitos I"	6:30
2.	"Tránsitos II"	6:23
3.	"Nasciturus"	5:09
4.	"Alphard"	3:30
5.	"Kinoth"	5:45
6.	"Colossus"	5:23
7.	"Hello World!"	8:08
8.	"Ugadi I"	3:23
9.	"Ugadi II"	2:48
10.	"Mutability"	4:00
