= Iamus (computer) =

Music composition computer at Universidad de Málaga

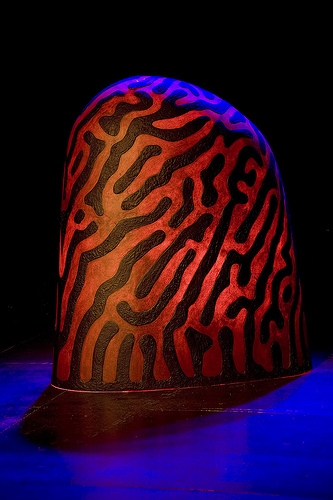
- Iamus computer cluster
- Active: September 2010; 16 years ago - Present
- Location: Universidad de Málaga
- Architecture: 352 AMD processors, Debian GNU/Linux operating system
- Operating system: Debian GNU/Linux
- Memory: 704 GB
- Storage: 70 TB
- Purpose: Composition of contemporary classical music

Opus one score

Opus one

Hello World!

Iamus is a computer cluster (a half-cabinet encased in a custom shell) designed to compose music and located at Universidad de Málaga. Powered by Melomics' technology, the composing module of Iamus takes 8 minutes to create a full composition in different musical formats, although the native representation can be obtained by the whole system in less than a second (on average). Iamus only composes full pieces of contemporary classical music.

Iamus' Opus one, created on October 15, 2010, is the first fragment of professional contemporary classical music ever composed by a computer in its own style (rather than attempting to emulate the style of existing composers as was previously done by David Cope). Iamus's first full composition, Hello World!, premiered exactly one year after the creation of Opus one, on October 15, 2011. Four of Iamus's works premiered on July 2, 2012, and were broadcast live from the School of Computer Science at Universidad de Málaga as part of the events included in the Alan Turing year. The compositions performed at this event were later recorded by the London Symphony Orchestra, creating the album Iamus, which New Scientist reported as the "first complete album to be composed solely by a computer and recorded by human musicians."

Commenting on the authenticity of the music, Stephen Smoliar, critic of classical music at The San Francisco Examiner, commented "What is primary is the act of making the music itself engaged by the performers and how the listener responds to what those performers do... what is most interesting about the documents generated by Iamus is their capacity to challenge the creative talents of performing musicians".
