= University of Málaga =

Public university in Málaga, Spain

Coordinates: 36°43′12″N 4°24′58″W

- Universidad de Málaga
- Latin: Universitas Malacitana
- Type: Public
- Established: 1972; 54 years ago
- Budget: €250,000,000
- President: Teodomiro López Navarrete
- Faculty: 2311 (2015–2016)
- Students: 35,979
- Location: Málaga, Andalusia, Spain
- Campus: El Ejido / Teatinos
- Colors: Ultramarine and silver
- Website: www.uma.es

University rankings

Global – Overall
- ARWU World: 801–900 (2023)
- THE World: 1001–1200 (2024)
- USNWR Global: =866 (2023)

The University of Málaga (UMA, Universidad de Málaga) is a public university ranked 23 among all Spanish universities and 683 in the world. It was established in 1972 and has, as of 2016, 30,203 Bachelor students and 2576 on a Master's program, 1255 tenured and 1056 temporary teachers. The UMA offers 65 degree courses and 6 double degrees, over 21 doctoral programmes, 64 master's Degrees, and 100 courses throughout the academic year. Education takes place in 18 centres by appointed teachers from 81 departments. The great majority of the teaching is organised within the two campuses, although classes also take place in locations spread around the city centre, as well as in Ronda and Antequera.

== History ==
The history of the University of Málaga begins in 1968 with the creation of the Association of Friends of the University of Málaga (Asociación de Amigos de la Universidad de Málaga). This association sought the creation of the university because of the needs of the city (it was the only European city of over 300,000 inhabitants which did not have a university.) The University of Málaga was founded by decree of 18 August 1972 by grouping existing centers in the late 1960s: the Higher Polytechnic School (Spanish: Escuela Universitaria Politécnica) (1927), the Normal School (1846), the Faculty of Economics of the University of Granada in Málaga (1963) and the Seminar (1587).

At the time of its creation, the university provided the Faculty of Economics and Business and the Faculty of Medicine, which were created after the ratification of the decree. Its first location was the El Ejido Campus, along with several administrative centers around the city.

UMA developed an expansion plan regarding fields of study and infrastructure. Thus, once established in El Ejido Campus, the university expanded towards the western district of Teatinos, an area that initially comprised the School of Medicine, the School of Humanities, and the School of Science, and gradually developed into a whole campus providing a full range of academic studies and services.

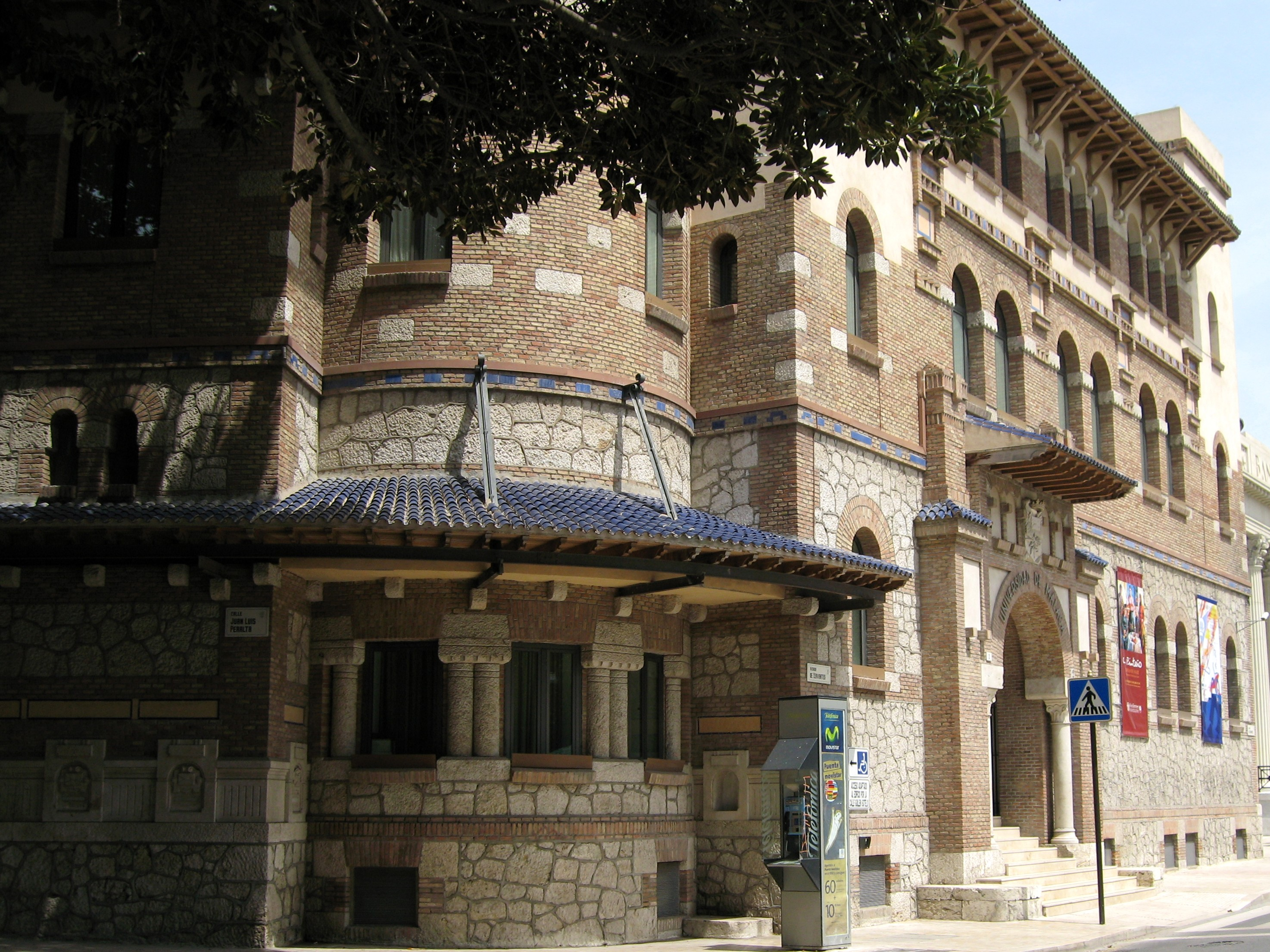
Casa de Correos y Telégrafos, home of UMA's Rectorate.

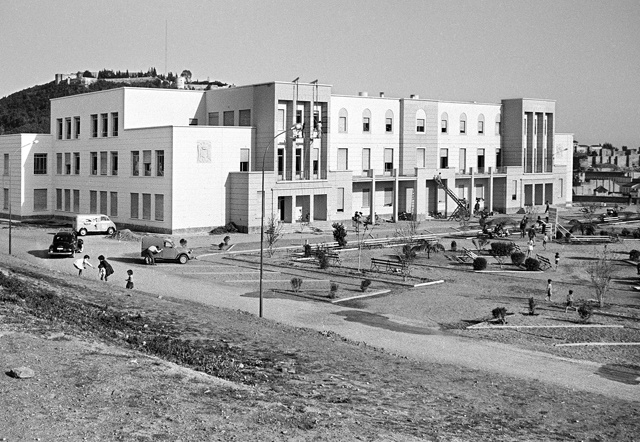
imagen Campus El Ejido

== Research ==
The UMA has 278 research groups, which are involved in 80 national projects and 30 European and International projects. In the last few years, the number of agreements and contracts with businesses and organisations has varied between 350 and 400 and an average of over 50 patents have been registered—30 of them of an international nature. In recent years, reduction in public funding for research projects has driven to the loss of many research positions and the rise of very short-term contracts, with salaries for researches as low as 600 euros per month.

== Campus ==
UMA is divided into two campuses in Málaga. In turn, some of the university's activities are carried out in other strategic locations throughout the city and province; thus, this network of knowledge is present in key points such as the city's business centre, Andalusia's Technology Park, and in other cities such as Ronda and Antequera.

Situated below the Alcazaba and opposite the Park and Port of Malaga is the Recorate's Building. Due to its cultural and architectural values, this building constitutes a cultural, social, and academic reference at the city centre. Moreover, the School of Health Sciences, the Centre of Spanish for Speakers of Other Languages, the Provincial Council's subsidised Nursing School, and the Grice-Hutchinson Experimental Centre are also located in the city.

=== El Ejido Campus ===
Located in the centre of Malaga, the campus at El Ejido houses the Faculties of Economic Science, Architecture and Fine Arts. This place contrasts sharply with surrounding areas where poverty and unemployment are common.

The Government Building, which accommodates the various offices of deputy vice-chancellorships, is situated on this site, along with most of the administrative departments and the Secretariat of the Board.

Another of the emblematic buildings on this campus is the University Auditorium, which can hold 450 people; it is here that the opening ceremony for each academic year takes place, and where university staff meetings and acts of protocol are held.

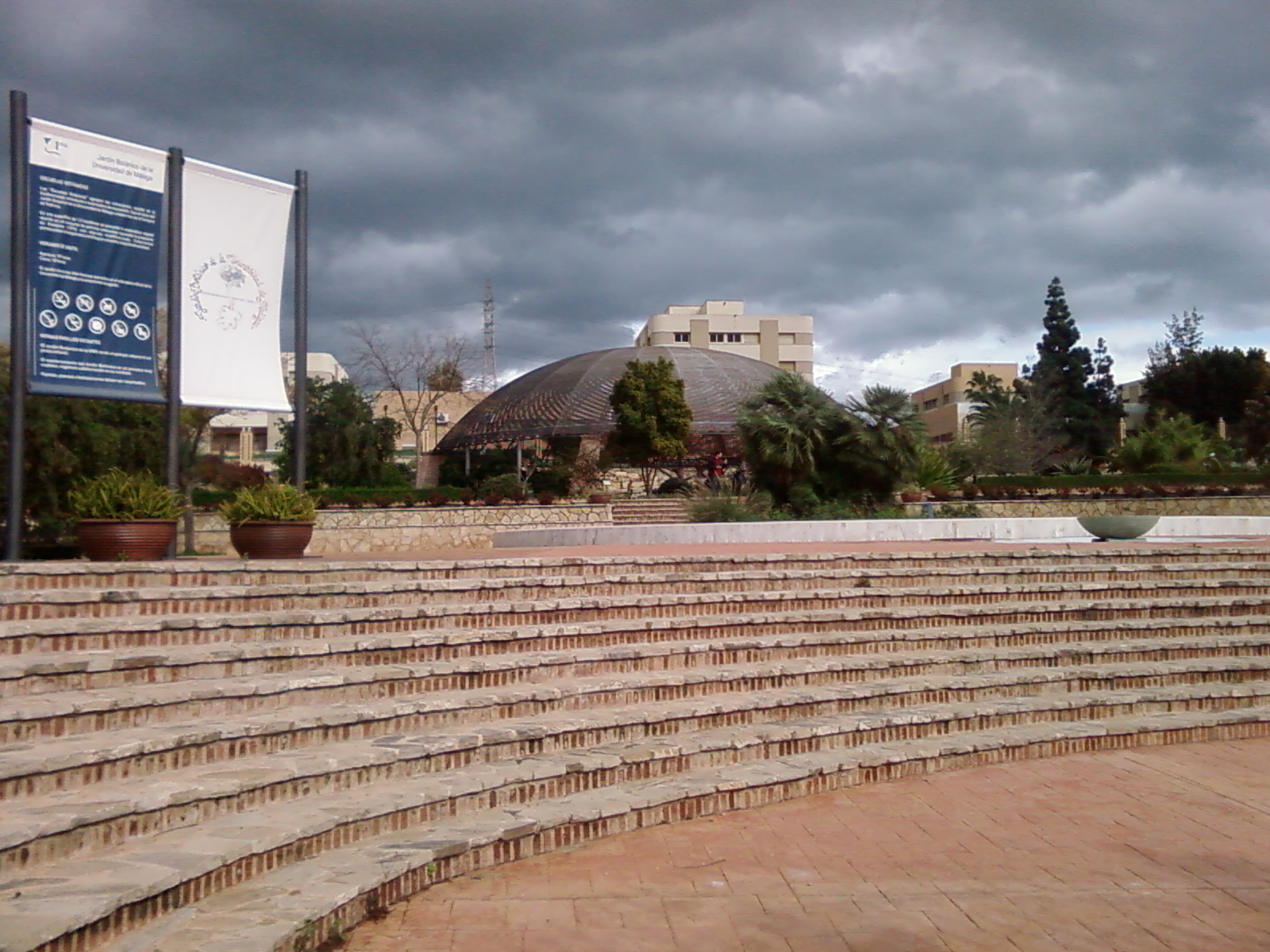
UMA's Botanical garden, with the School of Arts and Humanities in the background.

=== Teatinos Campus ===
At present the most numerous faculties are to be found at the Teatinos campus, and include the departments of Communication Sciences, Education Sciences, Law, Computer Engineering, Telecommunications Engineering, Tourism, Science, Philosophy and Arts, Medicine, Psychology, Industrial Engineering, Technology, Social Work and Business Studies.

Facilities for use by the university community include the general library, a publishing service, a research institute building, an infant school, the University Sports Complex, computer rooms, a botanical garden, five lecture halls and a choice of cafés, university dining halls and leisure areas.

The campus will be reinforced with the addition of a further 1.2 million square metres to the current surface area and will see the construction of facilities for teaching purposes, together with areas for educational, social, sporting, residential, and leisure use. There will also be a business and residential area, besides numerous green zones. Altogether, this will make up one of the largest university campuses in Andalusia. It will serve as a nucleus for the Campus Andaluz de Excelencia (Andalusia Campus of Excellence), and encourage all public universities to undertake common projects in training, research, and the transfer of knowledge.

The various building projects for the extension of the university will be carried out in different phases and undertaken with respect for the environment and resources. The soon to be constructed Health Sciences and Psychology Faculty, will be an addition to the recently opened Engineering and the Social and Business Studies Complex.

Other more important building projects in collaboration with the Ministerio de la Vivienda y la Consejería de Vivienda y Ordenación del Territorio (Ministry for Housing and the Department for Housing and Town Planning), will include student halls of residence and rented accommodation, together with a Science and Business Park, destined for use by research groups and companies.

The function of the Science and Business Park, is to form a strategic alliance for the creation of an academic, scientific, entrepreneurial and innovative environment, which will operate within the framework of the Estrategia Universidad 2015 (University Strategy 2015). The Ministerio de Ciencia e Innovacion (Ministry for Science and Innovation), is the driving force behind this project and has as its objective the creation of a Campus de Excelencia Internacional (Campus for International Excellence) for Spanish universities. Also being able to participate within the university environment, will be combined universities, research and development institutes, technological centres and the productive sector.

== Faculties ==
The University of Malaga has undergraduate and postgraduate courses in all disciplines. On offer are a total of 65 undergraduate degrees and 6 double degrees, 64 master's degrees and 21 doctoral programmes all of which can be combined with internal qualifications courses, language courses, summer courses and university programmes for seniors.

=== Degrees according to area of knowledge ===
ENGINEERING AND ARCHITECTURE POLYTECHNIC SCHOOL

- Electrical Engineering.
- Industrial Design and Product Development Engineering.
- Industrial Electronics Engineering.
- Mechanical Engineering.
- Double Degree in Electrical Engineering and Mechanical Engineering.
- Double Degree in Electrical Engineering and Industrial Electronics Engineering.
- Double Degree in Mechanical Engineering and Industrial Design and Product Development Engineering.

SCHOOL OF ARCHITECTURE

- Architecture.

SCHOOL OF TELECOMMUNICATION ENGINEERING

- Electronic Systems Engineering.
- Sound and Image Engineering.
- Telecommunication Systems Engineering.
- Telecommunication Technology Engineering.
- Telematic Engineering.

SCHOOL OF INDUSTRIAL ENGINEERING

- Industrial Organization Engineering (joint degree by the Universities of Malaga and Sevilla).
- Industrial Technology Engineering.
- Electronics, Robotics, and Mechatronics Engineering (joint degree by the Universities of Malaga and Sevilla).
- Energy Engineering (joint degree by the Universities of Malaga and Sevilla).

SCHOOL OF COMPUTER ENGINEERING

- Computer Engineering.
- Computer Science Engineering.
- Health Engineering (joint degree by the Universities of Malaga and Sevilla).
- Software Engineering.

HEALTH SCIENCES SCHOOL OF HEALTH SCIENCES

- Nursing.
- Occupational Therapy.
- Physiotherapy.
- Podiatry.

SCHOOL OF MEDICINE

- Medicine.

SCHOOL OF PSYCHOLOGY

- Psychology.
- Speech Therapy.

SCIENCES SCHOOL OF SCIENCES

- Biochemistry (joint degree by the Universities of Malaga and Sevilla).
- Biology.
- Chemical Engineering.
- Chemistry.
- Environmental Sciences.
- Mathematics.

ARTS AND HUMANITIES SCHOOL OF FINE ARTS

- Fine Arts.

SCHOOL OF HUMANITIES

- Art History.
- Classic.
- English Studies.
- Geography and Territorial Management.
- Hispanic Studies.
- History.
- Philosophy.
- Translation and Interpretation.

LEGAL AND SOCIAL SCIENCES

- SCHOOL OF COMMUNICATION
- Advertising and Public Relations.
- Audiovisual Communication.
- Journalism.

SCHOOL OF EDUCATION

- Elementary Education.
- Pedagogy.
- Pre-Elementary Education.
- Social Education.

SCHOOL OF ECONOMICS AND BUSINESS

- Business Administration and Management Economics.
- Finance and Accounting.
- Double Degree in Law & Business Administration and Management.
- Double Degree in Economics & Business Administration and Management.

SCHOOL OF BUSINESS AND MANAGEMENT

- Marketing and Market Research.
- Public Management and Administration.

SCHOOL OF LAW

- Criminology.
- Law.
- Double Degree in Law & Business Administration and
- Management.

SCHOOL OF SOCIAL WORK AND STUDIES

- East Asian Studies (joint degree by the Universities of Malaga and Sevilla).
- Labour Relations and Human Resources.
- Social Work.

SCHOOL OF TOURISM

- Tourism.

=== Postgraduate studies ===
For the academic year 2015/2016, the University of Malaga offers a wide range of 64 master's degrees so that students may acquire advanced specialised training—whether in subjects clearly leading to professional practice and career advancement or in subjects dedicated to research and investigation.

Also on offer are a wide range of 21 doctoral programmes for which the training period is equivalent to the teaching of one or more master's degrees, as well as eight doctoral programmes for which the training period is not included.

=== Other studies ===
- Language Courses for the University Community / Spanish Courses for Foreigners
- Summer Courses
- University programmes for seniors

== Governing board ==
- President: Mr. José Ángel Narváez Bueno
- Vice-president for Institutional Policy: Mr. Juan Antonio García Galindo
- Vice-president for Research and Transfer: Mr. Juan Teodomiro López Navarrete
- Vice-president for Student Affairs: Mr. José Francisco Murillo Mas
- Vice-president for Smart-Campus: Ms. Raquel Barco Moreno
- Vice-president for Undergraduate Studies: Ms. María Chantal Pérez Hernández
- Vice-president for Teaching and Research: Ms. Yolanda García Calvente
- Vice-president for Internationalisation: Ms. Susana Cabrera Yeto
- Vice-president for Strategic Projects: Mr. Víctor Fernando Muñoz Martínez
- Vice-president for Social Innovation and Entrepreneurship: Mr. Rafael Ventura Fernández
- Vice-president for Postgraduate Studies: Mr. Gaspar Garrote Bernal
- Vice-president for Culture and Sports: Ms. Tecla Lumbreras Krauel
- Deputy for Equality and Social Action: Ms. Isabel Jiménez Lucena
- General Director of Communication and the President's Office: Mr. Carlos Pérez Ariza
- General Manager: Ms. María Jesús Morales Caparrós
- General Secretary: Ms. Miguel Porras Fernández
