= Anav =

Anav may refer to:

- Anab, or Anav, a Biblical place
- Adjusted net asset value (ANAV)
- Anav means someone who is kind, humane, modest and humble like lord ganesha

== As a surname ==
- Capucine Anav, French comedian
- Members of the Anav family (he:משפחת הענוים):
  - Judah ben Benjamin Anav, Italian rabbi, approximately 1215–1280
  - Jehiel ben Jekuthiel Anav, Italian rabbi, thirteenth and fourteenth centuries
  - Zedekiah ben Abraham Anaw, Italian rabbi, 1210 – c. 1280
  - Benjamin ben Abraham Anaw, Italian rabbi, a brother of Zedekiah ben Abraham Anaw
