= Doron Toister =

Israeli musician

Doron Toister דורון טויסטר
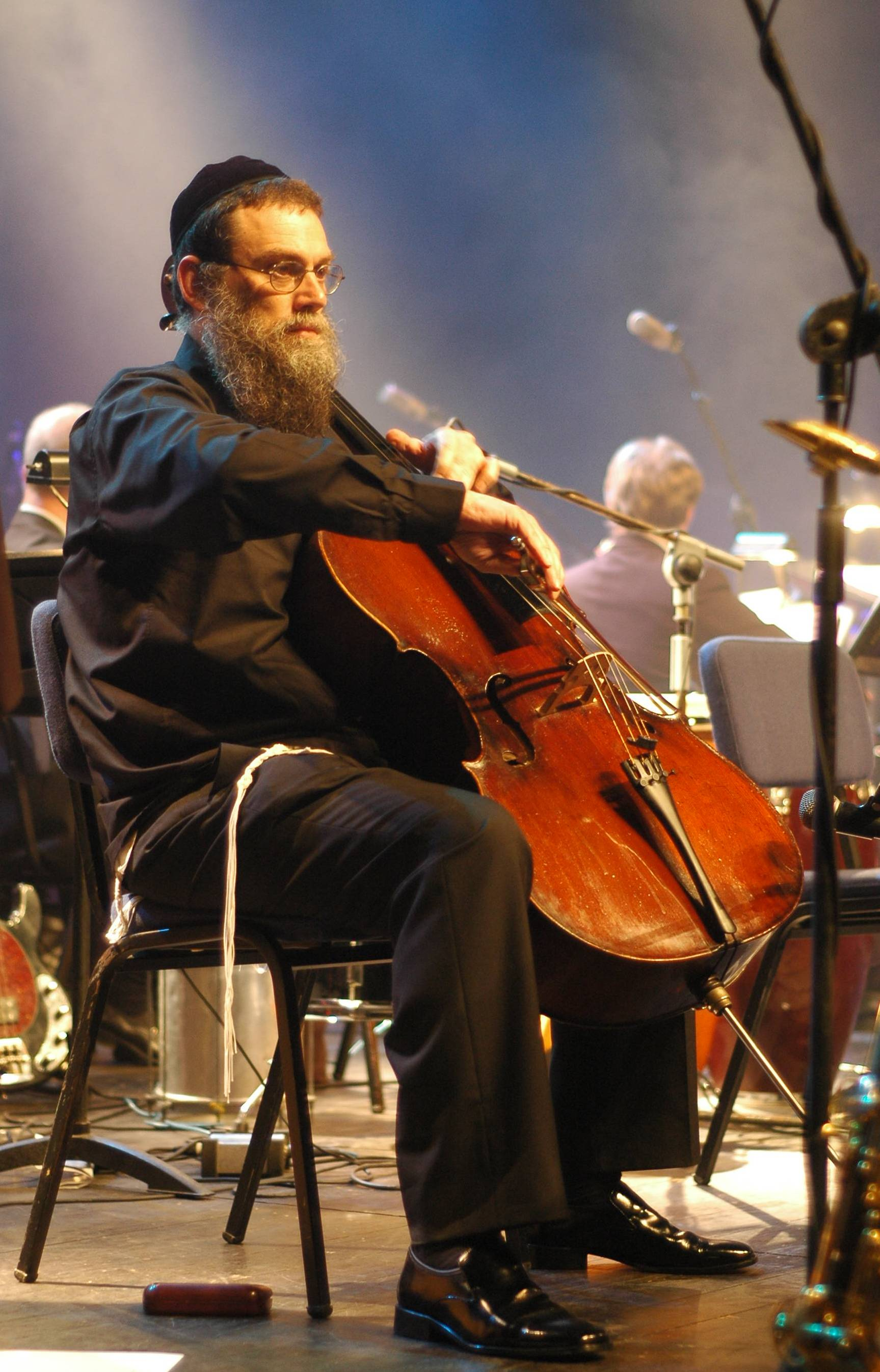
- Doron Toister (2009)

Background information
- Born: May 16, 1957 (age 68); Durban, South Africa
- Origin: Israel
- Genres: Classical
- Occupations: Cellist; Pianist; Composer; Arranger
- Instruments: Cello; Piano
- Awards: Minister of Culture's prize for Zionist art work in the music category (2013)

Doron Toister (Hebrew: דורון טויסטר; born 16 May 1957) is a cellist, pianist, composer and classical music arranger. He leads the cello group of the Israel Symphony Orchestra Rishon LeZion and Israeli Opera Orchestra.

== Biography ==
Doron Toister was born on May 16, 1957, in Durban, South Africa, where he grew up till the age of 3, when his father was being employed as an engineer in Durban's Municipality. Upon returning to Israel, his family lived in Ramat Gan, where he spent his childhood and youth.

At age of 5, he began studying music and piano with his mother, who was a music teacher. At the age of 6 began studying the cello, with renowned teacher professor Uzi Wiesel. In high school he attended the Thelma Yellin art school.

During his military service (1975–1978) he played with the Israel Defense Forces Chamber Quartet. During those years he also arranged string quartets and music for other various compositions. In 1979 he studied at the University of Essen in Germany with the cellist professor Maria Kliegel. where he also served in the Chamber Orchestra of Essen.

In 1980–1984 he studied with the renowned cellist professor János Starker at Indiana University School of Music in the United States, where he also served as his teaching assistant.

Over the years, he also studied jazz, improvisation and theory with professor Zvi Keren, with professor David Baker (Indiana University), and musical arrangement and orchestration with composer Menachem Wiesenberg.

At 22, won third place of the International Cello Competition in Geneva (1979). A year later won first prize in the international cello-piano duo competition of Radio Paris (1980).

Between 1985 and 1989 he served as the lead cellist of the Israeli Sinfonietta In Be'er Sheva. During this time, under the guidance of the Rabbi of Ben-Gurion University the renowned lecturer Rabbi Yechezkel Sofer, he became a Hozer Betshuva and Chasid of Chabad.

Since one year after its inception (1989) to the present, Doron is the leading cellist of the Rishon Lezion Symphony Orchestra and Israeli Opera Orchestra.

Performed in many solo performances, recitals, concerts and festivals with orchestras in Israel and abroad. Since 2000, he focuses mainly on writing and with arrangements to various musical ensembles.

In April 2013 he was announced as the winner of the Minister of Culture's prize for Zionist art work in the music category. In their reasons the jury wrote: "This is an original work that brings to the world of symphonic orchestral word the sounds the Eastern European "nigun". "Combining Eastern European poetry with a colorful blend of symphonic orchestration is impressive and convincing".

== Works ==
=== Composition ===
- "Jewish Rhapsody" for cello and orchestra performed by Ra'anana Symphonette Orchestra (2004).
- "A Symphonic Prayer" performed by the Israeli Rishon LeZion Symphony Orchestra conducted by Dan Ettinger (2006).
- "A Concerto for viola and orchestra" jazz style, performed by the Jerusalem Symphony Orchestra (2012).
- "Because we are with you", performed by the Jerusalem Symphony Orchestra, conducted by Emil Tabakov (2013).
- "Klezmer Concerto" a Duo for Clarinet and Orchestra, performed by the Gurfinkel twins and Ra'anana Symphonette Orchestra (2013).
- "Concerto for Cello Quartet and Orchestra", was first performed by the Rastrelli Cello Quartet and the Israeli Rishon Lezion Symphony Orchestra in March 2015.

=== Selected arrangements ===
- "Toccata" by Frescobaldi for Cello and Strings. Recorded by Deutsche Grammophon (2002).
- Natan Jonathan songs, performed by the Israeli Rishon LeZion Symphony Orchestra (2003).
- A Concert of Tangos, performed by the Israeli Rishon LeZion Symphony Orchestra (2003).
- "A Smail Suite" for piano by Debussy, performed by the Jerusalem Trio (2004).
- A Saturday Nigunim Concert, performed by the Ashdod Symphony Orchestra (2004).
- "La valse" by Ravel, "Octet" and "Nonet" by Brahms, performed at the Rolandseck festival in Germany by musicians from the Berlin Orchestra (2005).
- A concert of Ethiopian Songs, performed by the Ra'anana Symphonette Orchestra (2005).
- "Sonata for Violin and Piano" by César Franck, arranged for violin and orchestra, performed by Yaron Prensky and the Be'er Sheva Sinfonietta (2006).
- "Nomad" (Wandering) symphonic show of the works of musician Yehuda Glantz, performed by the Israeli Rishon LeZion Symphony Orchestra (2006), and in a DVD album in 2007.
- Chabad Melodies Concert, performed by the Jerusalem Trio (2009).
- "Beethoven's Fifth Symphony musical joke", performed by the Jerusalem Symphony Orchestra (2011).
- A Concert of Israeli songs for a cello quartet (2012).
- Music for movies "The Good, the Bad and the Ugly", "High Noon", "A Fistful of Dollars", performed by the Jerusalem Symphony Orchestra (2012).

=== Records ===
- "Internal Notes" Jewish soul melodies of Rabbi Yitzhak Ginsburgh performed on acoustic instruments (2005).
- "Strings of Soul" Chabad melodies in a Classical performance (2011).
