= Dubnov =

Dubnov or Dubnow (Russian: Дубнов) is a Russian masculine surname originating from the noun dub ('oak'), which characterized stubborn and strong men; its feminine counterpart is Dubnova or Dubnowa. Notable people with the surname include:

- Eugene Dubnov (1949–2019), Jewish-born Russian poet
- Shlomo Dubnov, American-Israeli computer music researcher and composer
- Simon Dubnow (1860–1941), Jewish-Russian historian, writer and activist
  - Dubnow Garden in Tel Aviv, Israel

== See also ==
- Romana Dubnová (born 1978), Czech high jumper
