= Isaiah di Trani =

Italian Jewish writer and Talmudic scholar

Isaiah di Trani ben Mali (the Elder) (c. 1180 – c. 1250) (Hebrew: ישעיה בן מאלי הזקן דטראני), better known as the RID, was a prominent Italian Talmudist.

== Biography ==
Isaiah originated in Trani, an ancient settlement of Jewish scholarship, and likely lived in Venice. He carried on a correspondence with Simhah of Speyer and with Simḥah's two pupils, Isaac ben Moses of Vienna and Abigdor Cohen of Vienna. Isaiah himself probably lived for some time in the Orient. He left a learned son, David, and a daughter, with whose son, Isaiah ben Elijah di Trani, he has often been confounded.

== Works ==
Isaiah was a very prolific writer. He wrote: Nimmukim or Nimmukei Homesh, a commentary on the Pentateuch, consisting mainly of glosses on Rashi which show him to have been, as Güdemann says, an acute critic rather than a dispassionate exegete. The work has been printed as an appendix to Azulai's Penei Dawid (Leghorn, 1792); extracts from it have been published in Stern's edition of the Pentateuch (Vienna, 1851) under the title Peturei Tzitzim and Zedekiah ben Abraham, author of Shibbolei haLeket and a pupil of Isaiah, composed glosses on it in 1297. As regards other Bible commentaries ascribed to him, see Isaiah di Trani the Younger. Isaiah also wrote an introduction (petiḥah) to a seliḥah beginning with איכה שפתי, which has been metrically translated into German by Zunz.

Isaiah's chief importance, however, rests upon the fact that he was the most prominent representative of Talmudic scholarship in Italy. He wrote commentaries on almost the whole Talmud, in the form of tosafot, ḥiddushim (novellae), or pesakim (decisions). Of his tosafot the following have been printed: those to Kiddushin, in the Sabbionetta (1553) edition of that treatise; on Ta'anit and Kiddushin, in Eleazar ben Aryeh Löw's Einei haEdah (Prague, 1809); on Baba Batra, Baba Kamma, Baba Metzia, Avodah Zarah, Hagigah, Shabbat, Niddah, Eruvin, Rosh haShanah, Yoma, Sukkah, Megillah, Mo'ed Katan, Pesahim, Bezah, Nedarim, and Nazir, in the two collections Tosafot R. Yeshayahu (Lemberg, 1861, 1869). Some extracts are also contained in Bezalel Ashkenazi's Shittah Mekubbetzet.

Of his pesakim there have been printed those on Rosh haShanah, Hagigah, and Ta'anit, in Oholei Yitzhak (Leghorn, 1819); on Berakhot in N. Coronel's Beit Natan (Vienna, 1854); on sukkah, tefillin, tzitzit, and mezuzah, in Sam Chayyim (Leghorn, 1803); and some others exist in manuscript only.

The author sometimes quotes the pesakim in his tosafot, from which it would seem that he composed the former earlier than the latter. As in many instances the pesakim appear to have been inserted in the tosafot by the copyists; they cannot always be distinguished. Of some of the tosafot Isaiah made two or more versions.

Isaiah also wrote, under the title HaMachria', halakhic discussions and decisions on ninety-two halakhic topics. The first edition of this work (Leghorn, 1779) contains also his tosafot (or chiddushim) on Ta'anit. Isaiah mentions other works of his; e.g., a second commentary on the Sifra, Kontres haZikronot, Sefer haLeket, and some responsa, a volume of which Azulai claims to have seen in manuscript and which exist in the collection of manuscripts in Cambridge University.

Isaiah possessed a remarkable clarity of expression, which enabled him to expound the most difficult topics with ease and lucidity. The same severe criticism that he passed upon such respected authorities as Rashi, Alfasi, Jacob Tam, Samuel ben Meir, Isaac ben Samuel (RI), and others he applied toward his own halakhic decisions whenever he changed his view. He was in favor of a more moderate interpretation of the Law, and he condemned the ritualistic rigor of the teachers of France and Germany. According to Güdemann, Isaiah, as a halakhic authority, had for Italy the same importance that Maimonides had for the Orient and Rabbeinu Tam for the Jews of France and Germany. He was held in very high esteem both by his contemporaries and by the teachers of the following centuries; even one so important as Isaac ben Moses of Vienna called him and Eliezer ben Samuel of Verona "the two kings of Israel"
