= Isaiah di Trani the Younger =

Italian Talmudist and commentator

Isaiah ben Elijah di Trani (the Younger) (Hebrew: ישעיה בן אליהו דטראני) was an Italian Talmudist and commentator who lived in the 13th century. He was the grandson, on his mother's side, of Isaiah (ben Mali) di Trani the Elder. He is usually quoted as ריא"ז (= "R. Isaiah Acharon, ז"ל"), or (ריב"א = "R. Isaiah ben Elijah").

== Works ==
He wrote commentaries on the books of Joshua, Judges and Samuel, Kings and Job. MSS. Nos. 217 and 218, in the Bibliothèque Nationale, Paris, contain commentaries by him on the prophetical books and on Psalms; the Rome MSS. contain a commentary on the five Megillot. The last-named are sometimes ascribed to his grandfather, but Güdemann advances several reasons in support of Isaiah ben Elijah's authorship, the principal being their identity of style with Isaiah's acknowledged commentaries. Gilbert Génébrard published a Latin translation of di Trani's commentary to Song of Songs in 1585 (the commentary was identified by H. J. Matthews in 1880).

Isaiah's commentaries are confined to simple, concise, and rational exegesis. Their importance lies in the fact that they were the first to be issued in Italy that were free from allegorical interpretations. In them he quotes the Spanish grammarians Ibn Janaḥ, Ibn Ḥayyuj, and Abraham ibn Ezra.

More important, however, is his Pirkei Halakhot, a ritual code, the first produced in Italy. Extracts from it are printed in Joshua Boas's Shilṭe ha-Gibborim, Sabbionetta, 1554, and in the editions of Isaac Alfasi's Halakhot. On the basis of the Talmudical treatises and following their sequence the Halakot are derived from the Mishnah rather than from the Gemara, and are clearly arranged in a precise way. The author ascribes great authority to the Jerusalem Talmud. He is independent in his criticisms of older authorities, his grandfather not excepted, whom he often quotes (with the abbreviation מז"ה = "Mori Zeḳeni ha-Rav"). As a sort of preliminary work to the Halakhot he wrote a book, Kontres ha-Re'ayot, which contained and discussed the proofs for his halakic decisions.

Isaiah also wrote a Tachanun prayer. Two other prayers, signed merely "Isaiah", may be ascribed to him or to his grandfather, who also was a liturgical poet. Unlike his grandfather, Isaiah was an opponent of Aristotle and of the rest of the Greek philosophers who "denied the Torah." Religious conceptions are, according to him, a matter of tradition more than of individual meditation. He advised against religious disputations with the Gentiles and against teaching them the Torah. He endeavored to shield the grotesque midrashim from derision on the part of Christian theologians and baptized Jews by interpreting them as symbolic or hyperbolic.
