= Jacob HaLevi of Marvège =

13th-century French rabbi

Jacob HaLevi of Marvège (Hebrew: יעקב הלוי ממרויש) was a French rabbi and kabbalist who lived at Marvège in the thirteenth century.

It was said that by prayers and invocations he was able to obtain decisions from heaven in religious matters, which were communicated to him in dreams. His decisions are collected in his "She'elot UTeshubot min haShamayim" (Responsa from Heaven), published by Judah Zerahiah Azulai in part five of David ibn Zimra's responsa (Livorno, 1818). Some of his responsa are found also in Zedekiah ben Abraham Anaw's "Shibbole ha-Leḳeṭ" and in Jehiel ben Jekuthiel Anav's "Tanya Rabbati," an epitome of the latter.
