= Niggun of Four Stanzas =

Niggun of the Chabad-Lubavitch Hasidim

The Niggun of Four Stanzas or the Niggun of Daled Bavos ("Niggun of Four Gates"), is a wordless tune of the Chabad-Lubavitch Hasidim, composed by the first Rebbe of Chabad-Lubavitch, Rabbi Schneur Zalman of Liadi.

The Niggun of Four Stanzas is of a slower tempo and in a minor key, characteristic of meditative "dveikus niggunim." However, while serious in nature, it is not necessarily intended to be a sad song. Rather, the niggun is intended to lift the singer and the listener to each of the four spiritual worlds of Asiyah, Yetzirah, Beriah and Atzilus, and in fact, the four sections of the niggun correspond to these four worlds. It holds a special place among Chabad niggunim, and is only sung at special occasions, such as during the High Holidays, Yud-Tes Kislev and weddings.

== See also ==
- Niggun
- Chabad Niggunim
