= Rafael Y. Herman =

Israeli artist

Rafael Yossef Herman (Hebrew: רפאל י. הרמן; born 1974 in Be'er Sheva) is an artist best known for his breakthrough photography project Bereshit – Genesis. Recalling the Genesis Creation story, this photography research project, of the Negev desert trees, marked for the first time in photography history, a nocturnes photos that looks like taken in day light, using just the moonlight, with no electronic or digital manipulation. The night, like never seen before, with monochromatic but full colored with "colors of the night". This lighted night, nearly divined, without shadow, creates a new surreal reality, one that our eye can not see and does not know.

The Bereshit project was exposed for the first time to public in Dec. 2006, in Milan, Italy, in the prestigious "Sala delle Cariatidi" of Palazzo Reale's museum of art. Bereshit photos, were one out of four fragments of Israel, that Rafael showed, under the title Magà. The exhibition attracted the attention of the public and media, and above all, of the Milan's assessor of culture, Vittorio Sgarbi, that wrote: "...His images are mirror of Creation, beyond which there is no more to say, revelation that only conceives the contemplative dimension, mixing spirit, mystery and material. Like this Herman wins the darkness." This occasion brought to Herman the invitation present the project to Pompidou Center, Paris. In November 2007, in a personal exhibition titled Bereshit, in Studio Guastalla, Rafael Y. Herman discovered by the prestigious art historian, writer and collector Arturo Schwarz that wrote on Herman's project "...this black light, is the responsible of the intense poetical aura, of this photos serial...". Newspaper and Magazine titled the exhibition like; The Voice of the Moon (Arte), Symbolic Research (Elle), The Trees Of Herman (TG), The Beginning Of All (Bolletino). During this exhibition period, Rafael lost his father Maxim (b. 1937 Bucharest d. 2007 19 Kislev ) just before finishing to write a documentary/romance book on his father's family story during the second world war.

Rafael Y. Herman showed his works in South America, Europe, and Asia in collective and personal exhibitions. He was collaborating with Amnesty International and Behia's government at Bahian Carnival 2002. Herman was graduate in Economy and Management from Tel Aviv University, and as a child had musical education for 13 years. Today he lives in Italy and spend his life between Europe, America, and Israel. Currently his multiform photographic projects roam from fashion to reportage, from editorial and movie set photography to experimental photo research.
