= Chris Newman (artist) =

British painter (born 1958)

Chris Newman (born 1958 in London) is an English-born contemporary composer, painter, author and performance artist. He lives in Berlin.

== Biography ==
Newman is an experimental interdisciplinary artist using the medium of music, painting, video, drawing and literature. From 1976 to 1979 he studied music at King's College London, taking a Bachelor of Music. During this time he met the Russian poet Eugene Dubnov and started to translate Russian poets (Osip Mandelstam, Velimir Khlebnikov), this process of translating proving important for his later work (e.g. from one medium to another / from life to art). Started writing own poems in 1979. Moved to Cologne, Germany, in 1980 to study with Mauricio Kagel (New Music, Theatre / Video) at the Hochschule für Musik Köln. First public performance singing own songs in 1982. Founded chamber-punk rock band Janet Smith in 1983; met Morton Feldman in 1984. First concerts and video showings: Institute of Contemporary Arts, London; Theater am Turm, Frankfurt; Kölnischer Kunstverein, Cologne; Cooper Union, New York. Started to paint in 1989, which led (from 1994) to the two medium installations; in recent years presented paintings in a more sculptural and installed manner, cutting the canvas and rearranging the parts to form a new relationship within the painting . These installations have been presented at (among other places): Kunstverein für die Rheinlande und Westfalen, Düsseldorf, (1994); Nationalgalerie im Hamburger Bahnhof, Berlin, (1999); Diözesan Museum, Cologne, Donaueschinger Musiktage; Limelight Kortrjk; Musée d'Art Moderne, Strasbourg, Arp Museum Rolandseck, Goethe-Institut Budapest. His paintings and drawings are represented in the Diözesan Museum, Cologne, Neue Museum, Nuremberg, as well as in the Neue Museum Weserburg, Bremen, and Hamburger Bahnhof, Berlin. Since the beginning of the 80's Newman's music pieces have been performed at concerts and festivals and recorded for radio productions (also orchestral commissions). These include songs, piano pieces and two piano concertos, the most recent of which Piano concerto No. 2 - Part 2, was premiered at the Donaueschinger Musiktage in 2006. He has published books of poetry and prose and issued a number of CDs. After the first phase in Cologne, he lived in Paris, London, again in Cologne and now in Berlin. From 2001 to 2002 he was professor at the Academy of Fine Arts in Stuttgart.

== Publications ==
- Chris Newman, Drawing Strings & writing Thing, ed. by Gerhard Theewen, Cologne: 2006, ISBN 3-89770-257-6.
- Chris Newman, Godded. ed. by Reiner Speck and Gerhard Theewen, Cologne: 2004, ISBN 3-932189-44-2.
- Chris Newman, Gespenster von Ibsen, Köln 2002 [textbook on the occasion of the performance (28.11.1996) in the Hamburger Bahnhof, Museum for Contemporary Art, Berlin], ISBN 3-89770-163-4.
- Chris Newman, The 90's and notebooks, Cologne 1999, ISBN 3-89770-082-4.
- Chris Newman, Recent Painting Mates. exh. cat. Olaf Stüber Gallery, Berlin 1999.
- Chris Newman, Me in a No-Time State, exh. cat. Erzbischöfl. Diözesan-Museum Köln, Cologne 1996.
- Norbert Prangenberg Zeichnungen / Chris Newman Poems, Cologne 1995, ISBN 3-928989-07-3.
- Chris Newman, Integrated Blake Phrase Paintings. exh. cat. Galerie Poller, Frankfurt 1995, ISBN 3-9802858-2-0
- Chris Newman, It with itself, Ausst.-Kat. Kunstverein für die Rheinlande und Westfalen, Düsseldorf 1994.
- C[hristopher] Newman, Eugene Dubnov. Poems/Gedichte 1979–90, Cologne 1993.
- Chris Newman / Norbert Prangenberg, Paintings, exh. cat. Galerie Poller, Frankfurt 1991, ISBN 3-9802858-0-4
