= Reuben Margolies =

Israeli author (1889–1971)

Rabbi Reuben Margolies
- ראובן מרגליות
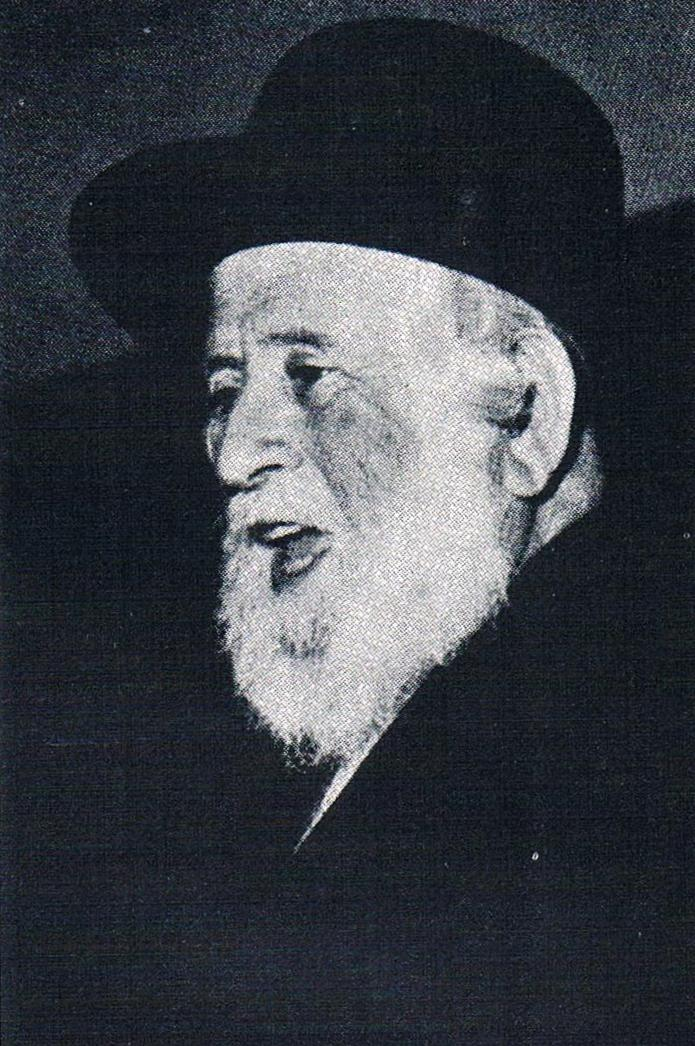

Personal life
- Born: November 30, 1889 Lemberg, Austro-Hungarian Empire
- Died: August 28, 1971 (aged 81) Israel
- Known for: Head of the Rambam Library, author of over 55 books on Jewish topics
- Occupation: Rabbi, Talmudic scholar, author

Religious life
- Religion: Judaism
- Denomination: Orthodox

Senior posting
- Awards: Israel Prize (1957)

Reuben Margolies (Hebrew: ראובן מרגליות; November 30, 1889 – August 28, 1971) was an Israeli author, Talmudic scholar and head of the Rambam library.

== Early life ==
Margolies was born in 1889 in Lemberg (now Lviv), then part of the Austrian-Hungarian Empire and now in Ukraine and from 1918 to 1940 in Poland. After the passing of his wife, he emigrated to Israel in 1934, settling in Tel Aviv.

== Writings ==
Margolies authored over 55 books on Jewish topics. He possessed a photographic memory, and was well versed in all aspects of both the written Bible, Oral Torah (Talmud and its commentaries) and Kabbalah (Zohar etc.). He established the Rambam library.

He wrote on a wide range of subjects, including on the Kabbalah.

He was also involved in a controversy with Gershon Scholem over the Jacob Emden/ Jonathan Eybeshuetz controversy.

He wrote a number of scholarly biographies of major Jewish personalities such as Maharsha, Ohr Ha-Chaim Hakodosh, Moses ben Nachman (Ramban), and Yechiel of Paris.

== Awards ==
- In 1957, Margolies was awarded the Israel Prize for his work on Rabbinical literature.

== Bibliography ==
- Toledot adam (Lemberg 1912) on Shmuel Edels, known by the acronym "Maharsha"
- Kav besamim (Lemberg 1913), notes on the writings of the Tosafists
- Kavei or and Tal tehiya (Lemberg 1921), two volumes on Jewish law in the Land of Israel, and essays on various topics, including "Medicine and Healers in the Talmud", "The Laws of Ger Toshav", and the first printing of "Yesod hamishna va'arihatah"
- Yesod hamishna va'arihatah (Lemberg, printed on its own first in 1923, then 1933, with addendums in Jerusalem 1956) on the creation of the Mishna
- Sefer Hasidim (Lemberg 1924, Jerusalem 1957, 1960, 1964, 1970) by Judah HeHasid, with biographical information, commentaries, and his own notes titled Mekor Hessed
- Toledot Rabbenu Hayyim ben Atar (Lemberg, 1925), biography on the Or ha-Hayyim includes the notes of Meir Dan Plotzky (Kli Chemdah)
- Or meir (Lemberg 1926, Tel Aviv 1964), biography of Meir of Przemyślany
- Margenita d'Reb Meir (Lemberg 1926, Germany 1948, Tel Aviv 1964), sayings of the above Meir
- She'elot utshuvot min hashamayim (Lemberg 1926, 1929, Jerusalem 1957), the responsa of Jacob haLevi the Tosafist, who claimed to have received answers to questions of Jewish law from an angel, with Margolies's extensive notes, as well as a comprehensive introduction discussing prophecy and its effect on Jewish law and other related topics
- Yalkut Margoliot (Lemberg 1927), homiletic material for Sabbaths and holidays, and various times of the year
- Imrei kadosh hashalem (Lemberg 1928)
- Vikuah Rabbenu Yehiel miParis (Lemberg, 1928), the disputation of Yehiel of Paris in 1240, with biography of Yehiel
- Mekor hesed (Lemberg 1928)
- Leheker shemot vekinuyim baTalmud (Lemberg 1928, Jerusalem 1960), on names and nicknames in the Talmud
- Hilula d'tzidkaya (Lemberg 1929, Tel Aviv 1930, 1961), a collection of different views and customs of great Torah scholars
- Vikuah haRamban (Bilgoraj 1928), the disputation of Nachmanides against Pablo Christiani in 1263, with his notes
- Butzina d'nehora hashalem (Bilgoraj 1930)
- Gevurat Ari (Lemberg 1930)
- Toledot Rabbenu Avrohom Maimoni (Lemberg 1930), biography of the son of Maimonides, Abraham ben HaRambam, including his responsa translated from the original Arabic
- Mekor Baruch (Lemberg 1931)
- Shem olam (Lemberg 1931, 1962), an attempt to discover the authorities behind the Talmudic phrase "One said... and one said..." in Midrash, Babylonian Talmud, and Jerusalem Talmud
- Nefesh haya (Lemberg 1932, Tel Aviv 1954), notes on Shulhan Arukh, Orah Haim
- Hagadah shel Pesach (Tel Aviv 1937, 1950), with commentary
- Sihot hakhamim (Tel Aviv 1938), a collection of sayings and quotes from various rabbinic sages
- Ner lamaor (Bilgoraj 1932, Jerusalem 1959), notes and emendations on the book Or hahaim of Haim ben Atar
- Mekor haberakha (Lember 1934), on clarifying the concept of making a blessing for a Torah commandment "al asiyatan", as well as the formulation of the blessings
- Zohar (Jerusalem 1940–1946, 1960) with his extensive notes (multiple printings)
- Sibat hitnagduto (Tel Aviv 1941), discussing the Emden/Eybeschutz controversy
- Mal'akhe elyon (Jerusalem 1945, 1964) on angels in the thought of Hazal
- Olelot (Jerusalem 1947), essays on various topics
- Tekunei Zohar (Tel Aviv 1948), a kabbalistic work attributed to Shimon ben Yohai, with extensive notes by Margolies
- Sefer HaBahir (Jerusalem 1951), a kabbalistic work attributed to Nehunya ben HaKaneh with extensive notes by Margolies
- Zohar Hadash (Jerusalem 1953), a collection of statements from the Zohar, arranged according to the weekly portion. Includes a discussion of the tradition of the Zohar, as well as comparisons of sayings from the Talmud and Midrash, with the Zohar
- Milhamot Hashem (Jerusalem 1953), the famous book by Abraham ben HaRambam about the controversy surrounding his father, Maimonides. This version is based on the manuscript from the Vatican. The introduction is a biography of Abraham ben HaRambam by Morgolies
- Mefarshei haTalmud (Jerusalem 1954–1961), a commentary on some parts of the Talmud
- Shaarei Zohar (Jerusalem 1957) notes on the Talmud directing one to the relevant passages in Zohar.
- Margaliot hayam (Jerusalem 1958), a commentary on Sanhedrin
- D'varim b'itam (Tel Aviv 1959), homiletic material for Sabbaths and holidays and various times of the year
- Hamikra vehamesora (Jerusalem 1964, 1965), various articles relating to issues of chain of tradition in Judaism, as well as other various topics
- Mehkarim bedarkhei hatalmud vehidotav (Jerusalem 1967), varied essays on the Talmud
- Peninim u'margoliot, A posthumously published collection of essays.

There is also a memorial volume edited by Yitchak Raphael and published by Mossad R' Kook, which describes these and more books in more detail.

== See also ==
- List of Israel Prize recipients
- Margolies
