= Moses ben Meir of Ferrara =

13th-century Italian Talmudic commentator

Moses ben Meir of Ferrara was a 13th-century Italian Talmudic commentator from Ferrara, Italy. He was a contemporary of Eleazar ben Samuel and Isaiah ben Mali. Haggahot Maimuniyyot quotes his Talmudic commentary three times, and also says he copied Judah ha-Nasi's commentaries on tractate Berakhot of the Talmud.
