= Chabad niggunim =

Hassidic movement

Like many other Hassidic movements, Chabad-Lubavitch has its own unique niggunim, or traditional melodies. Chabad niggunim were either composed or taught by the Rebbe of Chabad or their Hassidim. Niggunim are used to aid for meditation during Chasidic prayer or Torah study, as well as during farbrengens. some of these ancient Chabad melodies have recently made their way into mainstream music.

== The Chabad style of niggun ==
Chabad niggunim are admired across Hasidism for their intellectual content, expressing the aim in Chabad to investigate Hasidic philosophy using the mind as the route to the heart. The second Rebbe, Dovber Schneuri, distinguished between mainstream Hasidic emotional "enthusiasm" in worship, that is fostered outwards, and the Chabad ideal of inwardly created "ecstasy". His "Tract on Ecstasy", an unusually personal mystical account in Judaism, guides the follower in the meditative stages of the Chabad approach to Dveikus (fervour). In this ideal, ecstasy is an inner emotional expression, and can remain concealed in the warmth of the heart. In Chabad terminology, the aim of this is to reach "Pnimius" (inward Ohr) over "Hitzonius" (outward light). The fundamental Chabad text, the Tanya, articulates this method in Jewish meditation of "hisbonenus" (contemplative understanding). In classic Chabad thought, externally inspired emotional worship is considered a distracting path from deeper content, though this idealistic aim requires time to contemplate that may not always be available. In the present generation, more emphasis has been given in Chabad to outreach, though the classic ideal is venerated in legendary accounts of Hasidim, told in Farbrengen gatherings.

Chabad Rebbes told of two characteristic categories of follower, the "Oveid" who seeks practical Divine "service" from their mystical inspiration, and the "Maskil" whose first aim is deeper understanding of Hasidic thought. The average person can combine both archetypes in their daily life. Some Chabad niggunim are more suited to moments of inward contemplation, and others celebrate and inspire outward fulfillment. One renowned story both cautions against mixing the two necessary aspects, and also playfully recommends not to be overly concerned by their overlap:

A well known Hasid was filling out the company accounts at work. In the final tally, he answered the question of total outcome with the Hasidic aphorism that "Ein Od Milvado"! This means, "There is nothing outside of God", as in Chabad Divine Unity means only God truly exists. His fellow Hasid reprimanded his mixing of Hasidic and secular life. He replied that in prayer, people are not usually upset by their minds being diverted in secular thoughts. So, he concluded, it isn't so bad for holy thoughts to intrude in Worldly matters!

In Hasidic terminology, meditative dveikus niggunim correspond to "Lower Teshuvah" (Lower Return to God), and celebratory joyful niggunim to "Higher Teshuvah" (Higher Return). In Hasidic philosophy, such as explained in the third section of the Tanya, Teshuvah does not only involve repentance and rectification of previous spiritual faults. Rather, as the Baal Shem Tov taught, even perfectly righteous Tzadikim should return to God, in the higher Teshuvah of continual ascent in holiness. According to Kabbalistic exegesis of the Hebrew word "Teshuvah" (תשובה), it means "Returning the letter hei" (תשוב-ה). The Tetragrammaton Divine name has two letters "hei", the second one corresponding to the lower revealed levels of the Four Worlds, and the first one corresponding to the higher concealed realms. Lower teshuvah returns the second hei in rectification, higher teshuvah redeems the higher hei in holy ascent. The seventh Rebbe of Chabad taught that the main focus of our generation is in the "Higher Teshuvah". Accordingly, while the main niggunim of the previous Chabad Rebbes were meditative, many of the niggunim of the seventh Rebbe are joyful outward expressions.

== Chronological list of Chabad niggunim ==
On auspicious days in the Jewish calendar, the main niggun of each Rebbe is sung in Hasidic gatherings in successive order. This can take place on 19 Kislev, the last day of Passover or at the close of Shavuot.

=== Niggunim of the Baal Shem Tov and his Students ===
The first two generations of the general Hasidic movement, under the Baal Shem Tov and his successor the Maggid of Mezeritch.

- Baal Shem Tov's Niggun
- Shpoleh Zeideh's Niggun
- Niggun of Three Stanzas

=== Niggunim of Rabbi Shneur Zalman of Liadi ===
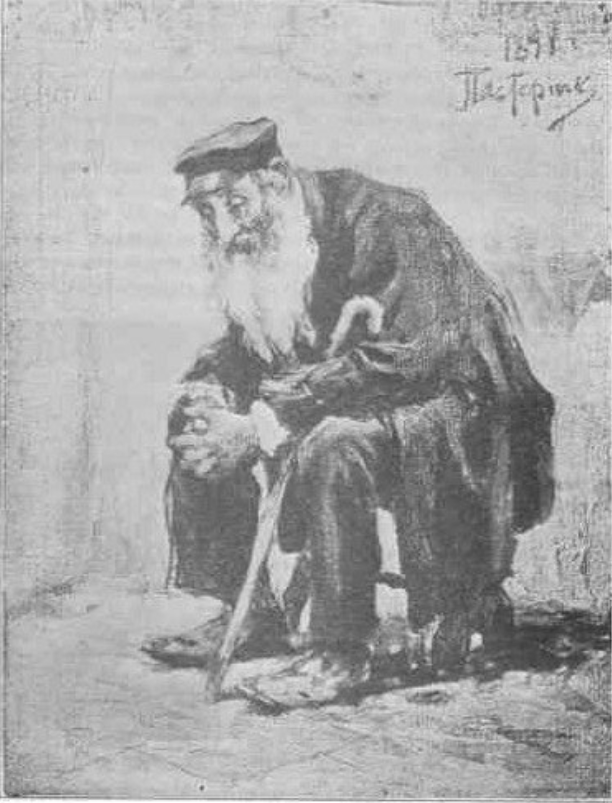
dveikus nigunim, usually without words, express individual Jewish meditation, soul searching and inward ecstasy in prayer

First generation of Chabad.

- Niggun of Four Stanzas. This melody is considered very holy and only sung on special occasions, including 19 Kislev and wedding ceremonies.
- Kol Dodi
- Avinu Malkeinu
- Ke'ayol Ta'arog
- Bnei Heichalah
- keli atoh

=== Niggunim of Rabbi Dovber Schneuri ===
Second generation of Chabad. Rabbi Dovber (also known as the Mitteler Rebbe) did not compose melodies of his own. Rather, his followers formed a choir called "The Mitteler Rebbe's Kapelya" would compose melodies.

- Padah Beshalom
- Nye Zhuritye Chloptzi
- Anna Avda Dekudesha Berich Hu
- Niggun of the Mitteler Rebbe's Kapelya

=== Niggunim of Rabbi Menachem Mendel Schneersohn ===
Third generation of Chabad.

- Yemin Hashem
- Nigun Histatchus

=== Niggunim of the Shmuel Schneersohn ===
Fourth generation of Chabad.

- Lechatchila Ariber
- Haneiros Halalu

=== Niggunim of the Rebbe Rashab ===
Fifth generation of Chabad.

- Rostover Niggun
- Hachanah Niggun

=== Niggunim of Rabbi Yosef Yitzchok Schneersohn ===
Sixth generation of Chabad.

- Beinoni

=== Niggunim of Rabbi Menachem Mendel Schneerson ===
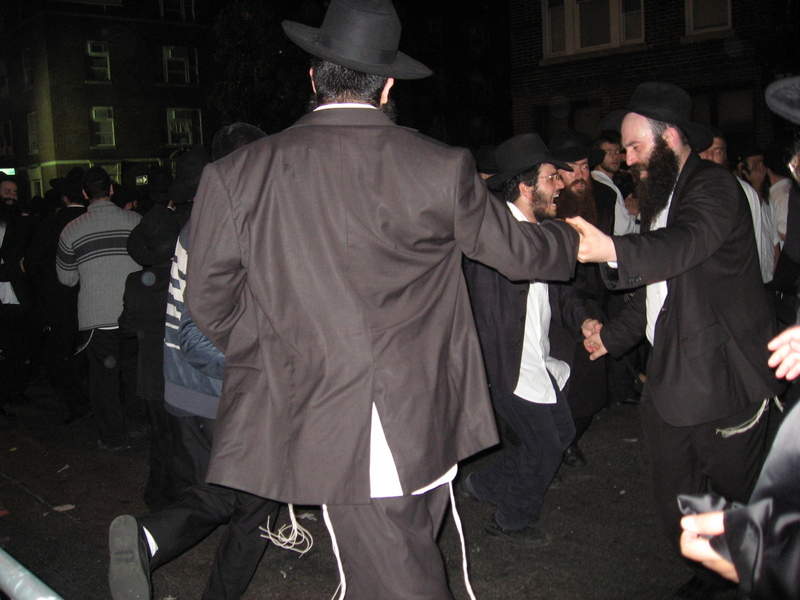
Joyful nigunim, often sung in company, celebrate Hasidic camaraderie and festive joy

Seventh generation of Chabad. The Rebbe taught a new niggun on every Simchas Torah from 1954 until 1964, the year that his mother, Rebbetzin Chana Schneerson died. They were composed by a variety of composers; some say they were taught to him by his mother. In addition, he adopted the French anthem La Marseilles on Simchas Torah 1974. He also taught Tzamah Lecha Nafshi and Asader Lesuedasa on Shabbos during the years 1953 and 1954, and Vehi She'amda on Pesach in 1954.

- Vehi She'amdah
- Asader Lise'udasa
- Darkecha Elokeinu
- Ki Anu Amecha
- Tzomah Lecha Nafshi/Ech Ti Duren Marko
- Niggun Shamil
- Rachamana De'onei
- Atah Vechartanu
- Anim Zemirot
- Stav Ya Pitu
- Hu Elokeinu
- Ki Anu Amecha
- Ha'aderes to the tune of the French anthem La Marseilles
