= Ha Lachma Anya =

Declaration recited during Passover Seder

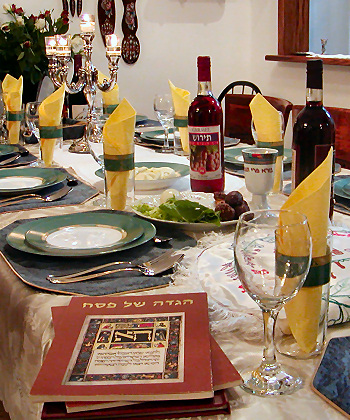
During the Passover Seder (Seder table pictured), the Magid begins with the uncovering and lifting of the matzah and the recitation of Ha Lachma Anya.

Ha Lachma Anya ("This is the bread of poverty ("affliction")") is a declaration that is recited at the beginning of the Magid portion of the Passover Seder. Written in Aramaic, the recitation serves as the first explanation of the purpose of the Matzah during the Seder.

== History ==
Although portions of the Haggadah quote the Torah, scholars trace the origins of the Haggadah to the Talmudic era. Specifically, scholars have identified two major versions of early Haggadot: an Eretz Yisrael version and a Babylonian version. Modern Haggadot are based on the Babylonian version, the earliest complete copies of which are found in the siddurim of Rabbis Amram Gaon and Saadia Gaon. Over time, Ashkenazic, Sephardic, and Mizrahi "sub-versions" developed; however, "there is relatively little difference in the basic text of the Haggadah within the descendants of the Babylonian versions".

According to Rabbi Yaakov Lorberbaum's Ma'aseh Nissim, Ha Lachma Anya was first recited after the destruction of the Second Temple in Jerusalem; according to Maimonides, Ha Lachma Anya was not recited before the Temple was destroyed. Shibbolei ha-Leket states that Ha Lachma Anya was instituted in Israel, while the Malbim and Ra'avyah trace the origins to Babylon. David Arnow notes that some sources state that Ha Lachma Anya originated during the Gaonic period (circa 750-1038 CE), while others trace it back as far as the first or second century CE. Some medieval Haggadot added the phrase "we left Egypt hastily" (biv'hilu yatsanu m'mitsrayim) at the beginning of Ha Lachma Anya.

Some Haggadot say K'Ha Lachma or Ha K'Lachma, "This is like the bread of poverty ("affliction")", to indicate that the matzah at the Seder is only a replica of that which was eaten by the Israelites in Egypt. Professor David Daube suggests that the wording, “This is the bread” might be misread as a hint of the Christian doctrine of transubstantiation, so some texts altered it to “This is like the bread”.

== Procedure ==
During the Magid portion of the Passover Seder, participants retell the story of the Exodus from Egypt. The Magid begins with the uncovering and lifting of the matzah on the Seder table and the recitation of Ha Lachma Anya. The words Ha Lachma Anya are written in Aramaic, and it begins with the proclamation that "this is the bread of affliction that our ancestors ate in Egypt". This recitation is based on Deuteronomy 16:3, which states that "[y]ou shall eat unleavened bread, bread of 'oni' (distress) — for you departed from the land of Egypt hurriedly", and the recitation serves as "the first official explanation for matzah in the Hagaddah".

=== Invitation to guests ===
Abravanel teaches that Ha Lachma Anya should be recited at the entrance to the house, with the door open, so that paupers can hear the invitation and enter". Sol Scharfstein also notes that in times past, the head of the household would go out to the street to say Ha Lachma Anya, thus inviting poor people to join him at the Seder.

== Modern interpretations ==
Anisfeld, Mohr, and Spector have suggested that Ha Lachma Anya adds "a sense of immediacy and urgency to our telling" of the story of the Exodus, and that the recitation "establishes the intimacy of our connection to the ancient Israelites" because participants in the Seder will "eat the same bread they ate" and will "experience the taste and texture of their lives as slaves". Zion and Dishon have also suggested that the reference to matzah in Ha Lachma Anya "is a memorial not of liberation, but of slavery". Isaacs and Scharfstein have also stated that the process of beginning the Magid by looking at matzah "is a visual reminder of events in Egypt" and that the Ha Lachma Anya "also stresses the importance of opening one's house to the poor and sharing one's meals with them, because it is through such generosity that one can aspire to redemption".

== Full text ==
Aramaic	Transliteration	Translation
הָא לַחְמָא עַנְיָא דִי אֲכָלוּ אַבְהָתָנָא בְּאַרְעָא דְמִצְרָיִם. כָּל דִכְפִין יֵיתֵי וְיֵיכֹל, כָּל דִצְרִיךְ יֵיתֵי וְיִפְסַח. הָשַׁתָּא הָכָא, לְשָׁנָה הַבָּאָה בְּאַרְעָא דְיִשְׂרָאֵל. הָשַׁתָּא עַבְדֵי, לְשָׁנָה הַבָּאָה בְּנֵי חוֹרִין.	Ha lachma anya di achalu avhatana b’ara d’mitzrayim. Kol dichfin yeitei v’yeichol, kol ditzrich yeitei v’yifsach. Hashata hacha, l’shanah habaah b’ara d’Yisrael. Hashata avdei, l’shanah habaah b’nei chorin.	This is the bread of poverty ("affliction") that our ancestors ate in the land of Egypt. All those who are hungry let them enter and eat, all who are in need let them enter and celebrate Passover. This year we are here, next year let us be in the land of Israel. This year we are slaves, next year let us be free people.

== Gallery ==
Ha Lachma Anya historical examples
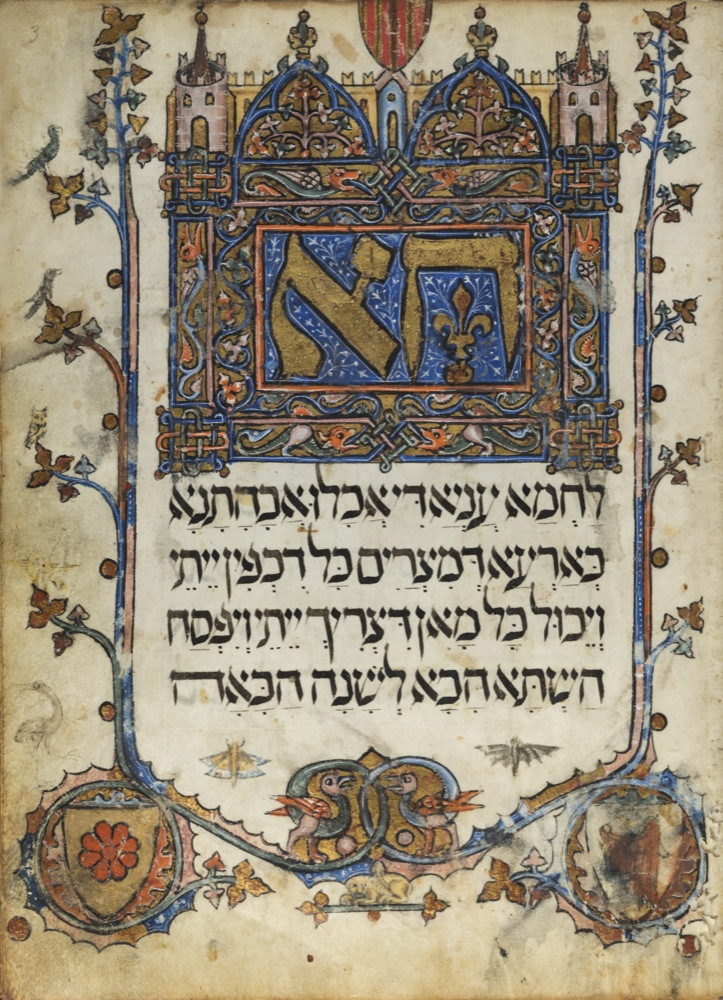
In the Sarajevo Haggadah, 1350 CE

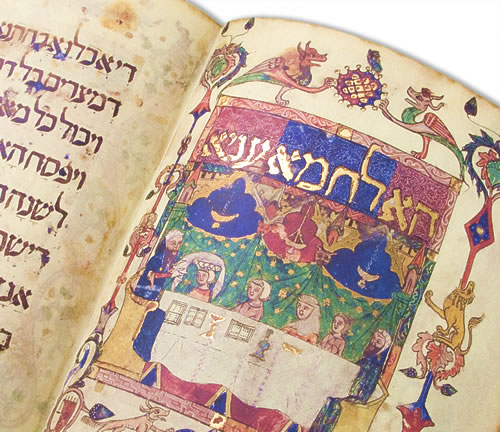
In the 14th century Barcelona Haggadah

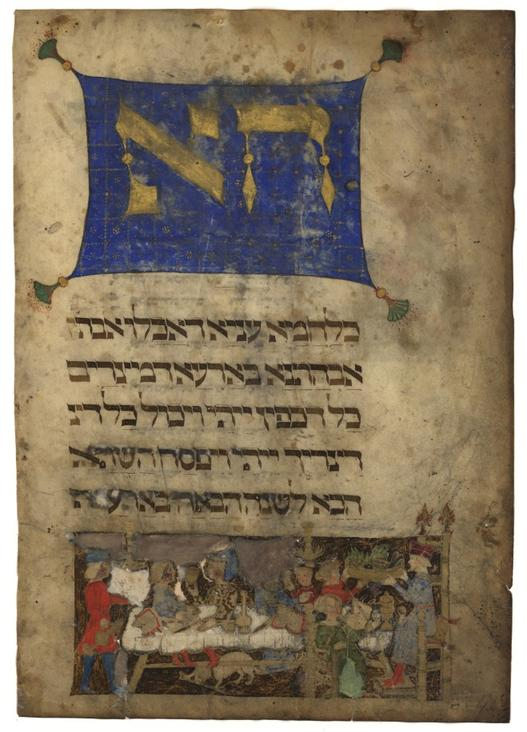
In the Rothschild Haggadah, 1450 CE. Includes use of the alternate Ha K'Lachma Anya.

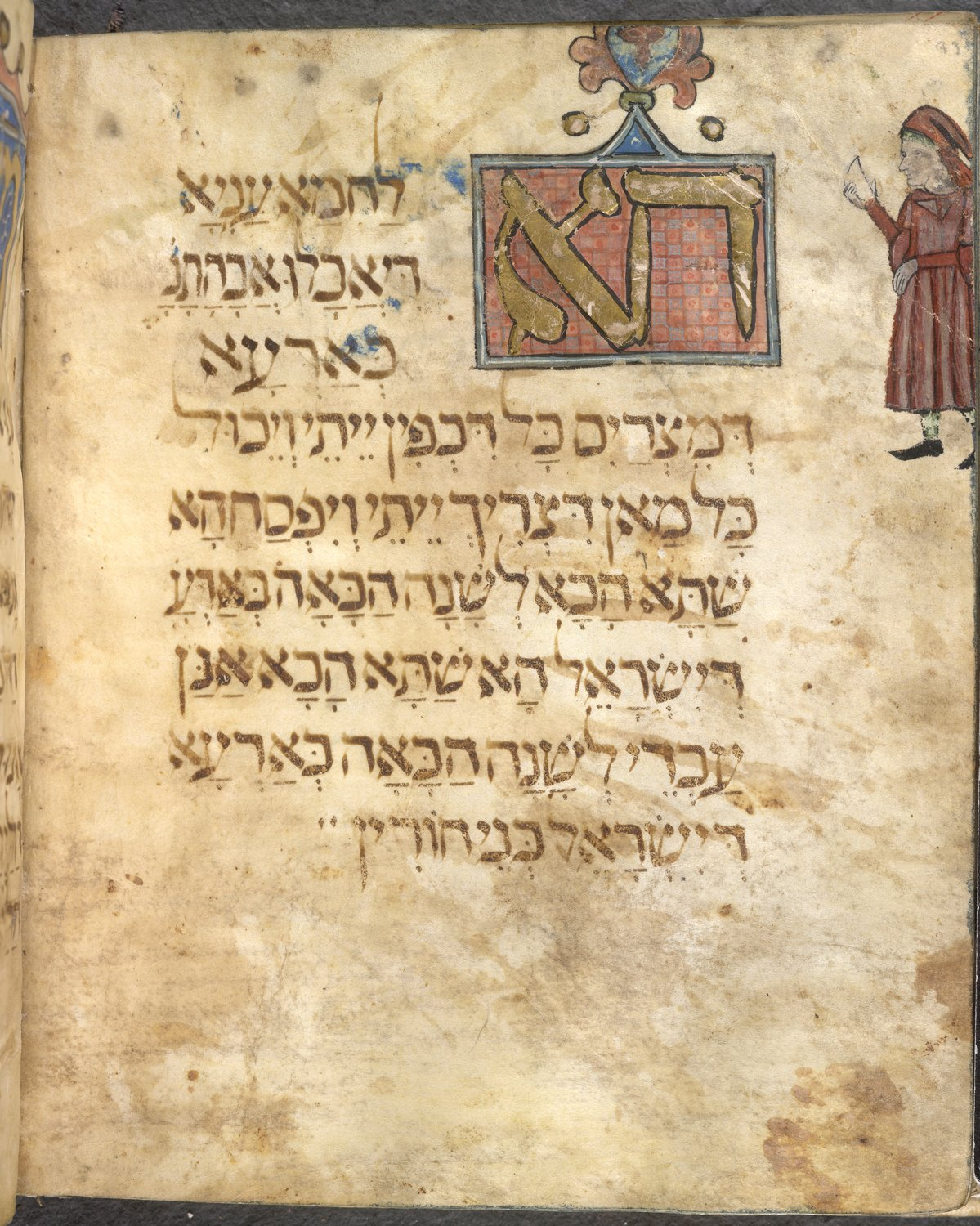
In the Sister Haggadah, 14th century.

== See also ==
- Afikoman
- Ma Nishtana
