= Computer audio =

Computer audio may refer to:

- Computer music, music generated by computers;
- Sound card, computer hardware for producing sound.
