= Tel Aviv Performing Arts Center =

Opera house in Tel Aviv, Israel

Coordinates: 32°4′34.89″N 34°47′7.85″E

- המשכן לאומנויות הבמה
- The Golda Center for Performing Arts
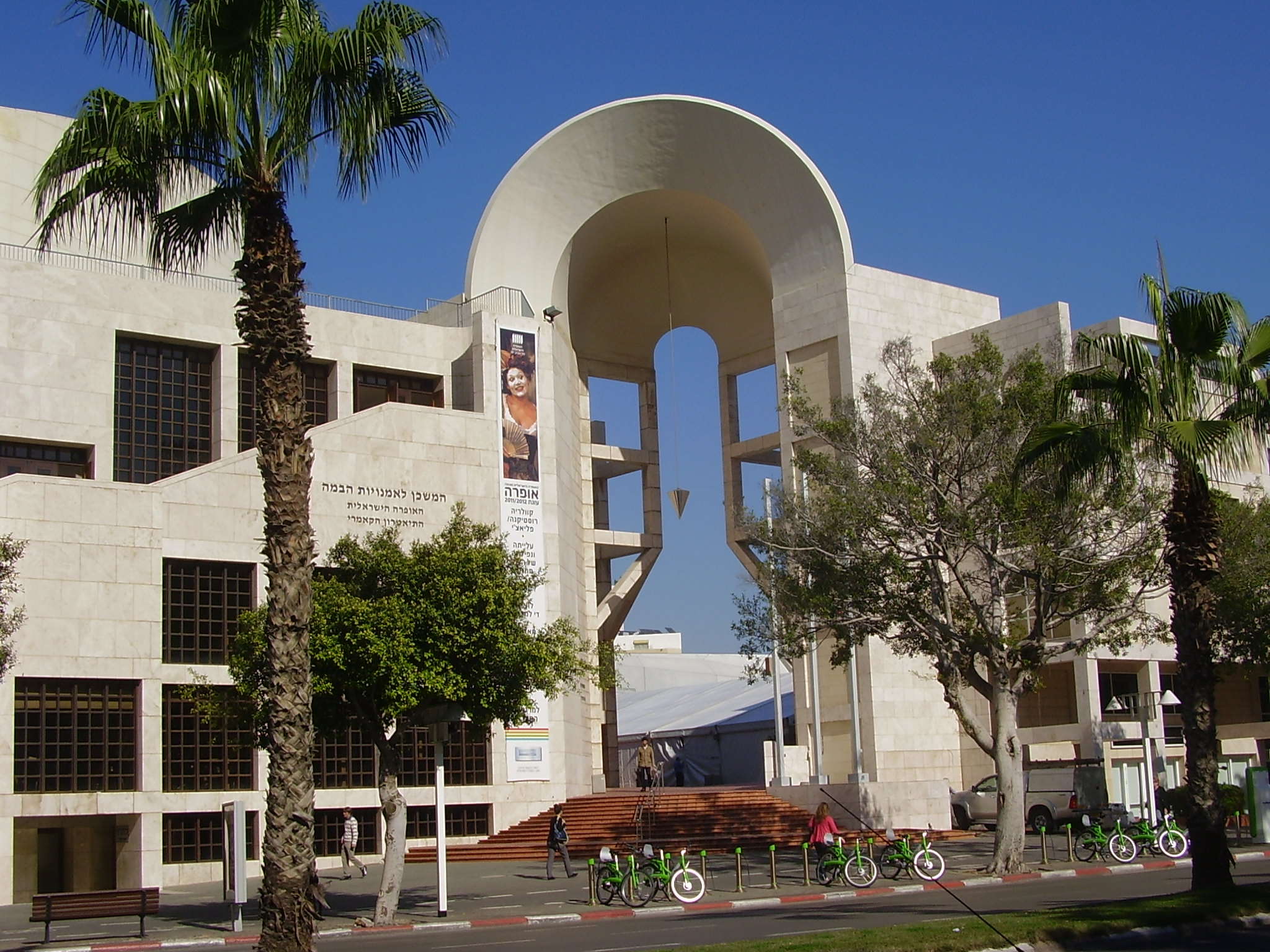
- Interactive map of Tel Aviv Performing Arts Center
- Address: King Saul Boulevard; Tel Aviv; Israel

Construction
- Opened: 1994
- Architect: Yaakov Rechter

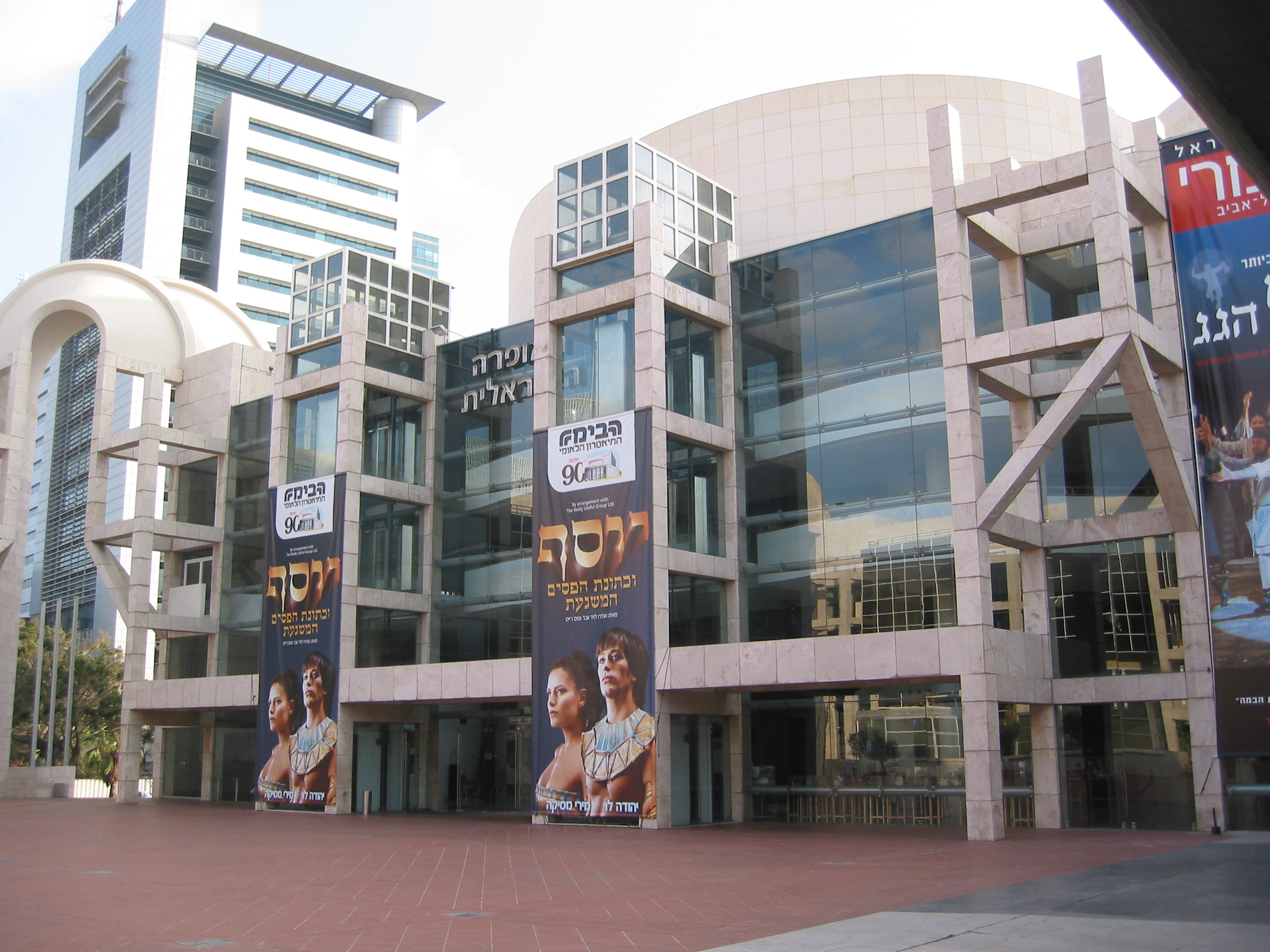
Israeli Opera House

The Tel Aviv Performing Arts Center (TAPAC, Hebrew: המשכן לאומנויות הבמה) or The Golda Center for Performing Arts (Hebrew: מרכז גולדה לאומנויות הבמה) is a performing arts center at King Saul Boulevard in Tel Aviv, Israel. It was designed by Israeli architect Yaakov Rechter.

Opened to the public in 1994, the center is home to the Israeli Opera, and Cameri Theater, a 2003 addition by Rechter Architects, and welcoming about a million visitors annually. The complex is adjacent to Beit Ariela (the Central Municipal Library) and the Tel Aviv Museum of Art, with Dubnow Park lying at the back of the center.

Charles Bronfman was the largest single donor who contributed to the renovation of the Tel Aviv Performing Arts Center during the 2010s.

The center hosts a variety of performances including dance, classical music, opera and jazz, as well as fine arts exhibitions.
