= Benjamin ben Abraham Anaw =

Benjamin ben Abraham Anaw (also known as Benjamin ben Abraham Anav) was a Roman Jewish liturgical poet, Talmudist, and commentator of the thirteenth century, and older brother of Zedekiah ben Abraham Anaw.

Perhaps the most gifted and learned of his Roman contemporaries (although chiefly a poet), Anaw possessed a thorough mastery of halakhic literature, diligently studied philology, mathematics, and astronomy, and wielded a keen, satirical pen.

== Poetry ==
His poetical activity began in 1239, when Nicholas Donin, a Jewish convert to Christianity, assailed the Talmud and appealed to Pope Gregory IX to order its destruction and the persecution of its students. Donin's agitation filled the Roman Jews with terror, and they seem to have appointed a day for fasting and prayer. At that time—and possibly for that fast-day—Anaw composed a penitential hymn "To whom shall I flee for help"—an acrostic of twelve stanzas.

Donin's endeavors met meanwhile with great success. In June, 1239, several wagon-loads of Talmudic manuscripts were burned in Paris and Rome: at the latter place the Jewish cemetery was destroyed. These events stirred the poet to a bitter elegy, "My heart is convulsed", in which he deeply laments the fate of Israel and passionately appeals to God to avenge the desecration of the dead.

In the end, Donin's plot was indeed carried out with great success, when in June 1242 (or 1244), after the Paris trial, tens of thousands of Talmudic manuscripts were burned in Paris and Rome, and the Jewish cemetery in Rome was destroyed as a result. These events inspired the poet Rabbi Binyamin to compose the poem "My heart recoils", in which he deeply laments the fate of the people of Israel and pleads with God to avenge the desecration of the dead.

Rabbi Binyamin corresponded quite a bit with his rabbi, Rabbi Avigdor Cohen, and addressed many halachic questions to him. Also, in the book of his brother Rabbi Zedekiah - 'Shavli Halket' - many laws from Rabbi Binyamin's name appear.

Along with his greatness in Halacha, Rabbi Binyamin was also a prolific bard and his poems and poems constitute a wide range of works, ranging from witty satires to bitter lamentations. About 40 of his poems have been preserved, among them various prayer poems, some of which later appeared in the circulation of the Bani Rumi tradition and some of which are still stored in manuscripts. One of his most popular poems is the forgiveness for the Yom Kippur chant "Bat Ami la Tashsha", which became common in Israeli communities after it entered the Ashkenazi order of forgiveness for a small Yom Kippur.

Anaw wrote numerous Hebrew poems for the liturgy, which are embodied in part in the Roman Machzor, partly still extant in manuscript. He is the author of the following works:

- "The Burden of the Valley of Vision", a satirical poem directed against the arrogance of the wealthy and the nobility (Riva di Trento, 1560; reprinted, Lemberg, 1859, by M. Wolf, in his Hebrew chrestomathy (Israel's Praises).
- "Alphabetical Commentary", on the Aramaic pieces of the Shavuot liturgy. In this treatise he exhibits a knowledge of Italian, Latin, Greek, and Arabic.
- "Sefer Yedidut" (Book of Friendship), a ritualistic work, which has disappeared. It is mentioned by Anaw in the preface to his abridgment of Eliezer ben Samuel's "Sefer Yereim."
- "Sha'arei Etz Chayyim" (The Gates Conducting to the Tree of Life), a work on practical ethics, in the form of moral sayings. The poem contains sixty-three strophes, arranged according to the letters of the alphabet. Each chapter deals with one virtue or one vice. Among the subjects treated are love, hospitality, faithfulness, cheating, thankfulness, shame, pride, charity. It was printed in Prague, 1598, and reprinted in "Kobetz al Yad".
- Glosses to Rashi's commentary on the Bible and to Solomon ben Shabbethai's commentary on the "Sheëltot."
- "Rules for Making a Calendar," in which he utilizes his mathematical and astronomical knowledge. This manuscript served several later writers on the same subject. Anaw was in correspondence with Abigdor Cohen, to whom he addressed numerous halakhic questions. He himself gave many halakhic decisions, which are referred to in his brother's work, Shibbolei haLekket.
