= Zedekiah ben Abraham Anaw =

13th-century author of halakhic works

Zedekiah ben Abraham Anaw (13th century; also known by the surname HaRofeh) was an author of halakhic works and younger brother of Benjamin ben Abraham Anaw. He lived at Rome and received his Talmudic training not only in Rome but also in Germany where he was the pupil of Jacob of Würzburg and possibly also of Abigdor Cohen of Vienna.

== Shibbolei haLeket ==
He owes his reputation to his compilation of ritual law entitled Shibbolei haLeket (Ears of Gleaning). It is divided into 372 paragraphs forming twelve sections, covering the laws, regulations, and ceremonies relating to prayers, Sabbath, blessings, and the Jewish holidays. Appended to the work are several treatises and responsa on miscellaneous religious and legal matters, such as circumcision, mourning rites, tzitzit, shechita, inheritance, and interest. As the title indicates, and as the author never fails to point out, the material is not original but rather was culled from many older authorities, such as Halakot Gedolot, Sefer haPardes, Alfasi, Isaac ben Abba Mari, Zerahiah ha-Levi, Isaiah di Trani, etc. To these extracts from other authorities the work owes its vogue. The preface, written in a pure and vigorous Hebrew, is introduced by a short acrostic.

But Zedekiah did not restrict himself to the mere work of a compiler. He systematized his material skillfully, gave it a concise as well as popular form, and judiciously discriminated between conflicting opinions and decisions, giving preference to those that seemed to him true. For this procedure he apologized modestly in his preface with an anecdote, in substantially the following terms: A philosopher, when asked how he dared to oppose the great men of the past, answered, "We fully acknowledge the greatness of our old authorities and the insignificance of ourselves. But we are in the position of pygmies that ride on the shoulders of giants. Pygmies though we are, we see farther than the giants when we use their knowledge and experience."

Additions to Shibbolei haLeket were made by Zedekiah himself in a work the title of which is no longer known: these additions also contain a large number of responsa. It is usually cited, however, as Issur va-Hetter (Things Forbidden and Allowed).

A complete edition of Shibbolei haLeket was published by Solomon Buber in 1886 at Vilna. The editor wrote a comprehensive introduction to it, containing an analysis of the work. Abridgments were published much earlier: Venice (Daniel Bomberg), 1545; Dubnov, 1793; Salonica, 1795. Further, it was plagiarized and published in a condensed form under the title "Tanya," or "Tanya Rabbati," which went through four editions: Mantua, 1514; Cremona, 1565; Zolkiev, 1800; Szydlikov, 1836. A third abridgment entitled Ma'aseh ha-Geonim (The Work of Old Authorities) circulated in manuscript and is extant in the Bodleian Library, Oxford.

In 1966, Samuel Mirsky published the first volume of a critical edition based on the British Museum (Or. 13705) manuscript which predated Buber's manuscripts by almost 200 years. A second portion of that work was published posthumously in a memorial volume in 1971. In 2023, Wieder Press published a facsimile edition of the entire British Museum manuscript.

Anaw was in correspondence with Avigdor Cohen, Meir of Rothenburg, and Abraham ben Joseph of Pesaro. Very often he mentions his senior contemporary, Isaiah di Trani (the Elder), to whose Bible commentary Anaw wrote glosses in 1297.
