= 19 Kislev =

Chassidic holiday

Yud Tes Kislev
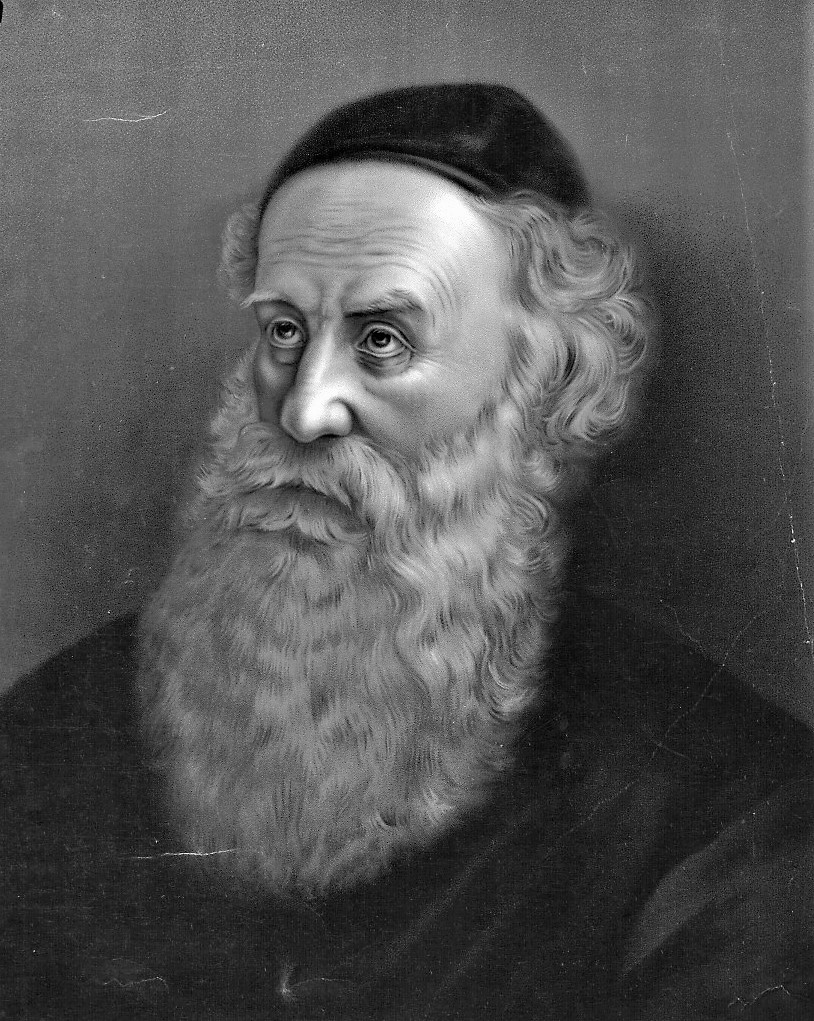
- The Alter Rebbe
- Official name: Hebrew: י"ט כסלו
- Observed by: Hasidic Jews, and particularly, followers of Chabad, as The Alter Rebbe said "This Day (19th of Kislev) will be established as a permanent Holiday for the Jewish People, through which thousands will be awakened to serve God."
- Significance: Yom Hillula (anniversary of death) of the Maggid of Mezritch; Release of the founder of Chabad Hasidism, Rabbi Shneur Zalman of Liadi, from a Russian prison
- Celebrations: Farbrengen; tish; or l'Chaim (toast)
- Observances: Tachanun and similar prayers are omitted from daily prayers
- Date: 19 Kislev
- Frequency: annual

The 19 Kislev or Yud Tes Kislev (Hebrew: י"ט כסלו) refers to the 19th day of the Jewish month of Kislev.

The date is celebrated by Hasidic Jews as the Yom Hillula (anniversary of death) of the Maggid of Mezritch, successor of the Baal Shem Tov (the founder of Hasidism), who died on this date in 1772, and more significantly within the Chabad movement, as the date of the liberation of Rabbi Shneur Zalman of Liadi from prison (1798).

== Festival of the liberation of Rabbi Shneur Zalman ==
=== Background ===
The imprisonment of Rabbi Shneur Zalman of Liadi (Hebrew: שניאור זלמן מליאדי), the first Rebbe of Chabad (also known as the "Alter Rebbe" in Yiddish) occurred against the backdrop of intense conflict between the Hasidim and the Mitnagdim (opponents of Hasidism).

In the end of 1796 (kislev 5557) the Tanya-the seminal work in Chabad Hasidut-was completed. This book was received joyously by the hasidic community in Vilna, one of the great centers of the Misnagdim. The Misnagdim were disturbed by this development and subjected the Hasidim to abuse.

Following the death of the Gaon of Vilna on October 9, 1797 (Sukkot, 5558), a rumor spread among his grieving admirers that the Hasidim were exaggerating their Simchat Beit HaShoeivah festivities in joy over the death of their greatest enemy.

In response, extreme Mitnagdim renewed persecutions against the Hasidim. In defense, the Hasidim appealed to the Russian authorities to limit the authorities of the community council which was oppressing them. They successfully curtailed the council’s activities.

The anger and frustration resulting from this defeat likely impelled the Mitnagdim to retaliate by informing against Rabbi Shneur Zalman. The choice to target Shneur Zalman specifically was due to the fact that many Hasidim in Vilna were connected to him.

=== Accusations ===
The official process began on May 8, 1798, when a defamatory letter, signed by "Hirsch Ben David," (a pseudonym) was sent to the chief prosecutor of Czar Paul I.

The author of this letter, who was likely acting in concert with the heads of the Mitnagdim in Vilna, leveled three main claims against Rabbi Shneur Zalman (referred to as Rabbi Zalman Ben Baruch):

1. That Rabbi Shneur Zalman was involved in rebellion and conspiracy.
2. Shneur Zalman and his companions were accused of leading a life with no framework of law.
3. They were branded thieves and bribe-takers.

Another aspect of the accusations was the transferring of funds to Israel for poor people in Israel which was at the time under Ottoman rule. Russia and the Ottoman empire were extremely hostile to each other, recently having fought a war. Shneur Zalman was thus accused of supporting the Ottomans.

=== Imprisonment and Interrogation ===
The Czar ordered an investigation based on the letter. The governor of White Russia, received the order to arrest Shneur Zalman on September 15, 1798. Shneur Zalman was sent, along with his confiscated books and papers, to St. Petersburg by the first week of October 1798 (Isru Chag, the day after Simchat Torah 5559) Twenty two additional Hasidim who were prominent in the community were arrested as well.

On the way to St. Petersburg, Rabbi Shneur Zalman requested to have the carriage taking him stop for Shabbat. After refusing, a series of mysterious mishaps occurred, convincing the driver to stop to respect the prisoner’s wishes.

The Hasidic community immediately mobilized to lobby the government, raise money and take care of internal affairs during Rabbi Shneur Zalman’s imprisonment.

The interrogations focused on three main topics: whether Hasidism was a new religion, contacts with revolutionary elements, and sending money abroad. In his defense, Shneur Zalman made several key arguments:

1. Hasidism is not a New Religion: He argued Hasidism was merely a restoration of ancient customs emphasizing prayer with intention of the heart (love and awe), which he claimed had been neglected due to corrupt rabbis in Poland who had bought their posts.
2. On Finances: He fervently denied receiving stolen money, detailing his modest sources of income, which included his wife’s tavern and grain business, and a small stipend as a preacher.
3. On Foreign Connections: He explained that the money sent to the Land of Israel was a small part of a widespread, ancient fundraising effort by emissaries, claiming his role was limited to issuing request letters, acting as many other rabbis did.

=== Stories of the imprisonment ===
Some stories told of his imprisonment: in one account the Czar visited Shneur Zalman dressed as an investigator in his prison cell at which point Shneur Zalman stood up to honor the Czar, impressing him greatly and convincing him of his innocence.

Another story is told that the investigator asked Shneur Zalman about the meaning of God’s question to Adam after eating from the tree of knowledge, “Where are you”? Genesis 3 9 After giving the simple understanding, Shneur zalman interpreted the query to be a question to each person at all times, “where are you holding in life, what are your accomplishments?” This greatly impressed the investigator.

Chasidic lore tells that the spirits of the Maggid of Mezeritch and the Baal Shem Tov came to visit Rabbi Shneur Zalman in prison. Rabbi Yosef Yitzchok Schneersohn is reputed to have once visited the cell (when he was in Saint Petersburg in the summer of 1911), and when he returned, his father, Rabbi Sholom Dovber Schneersohn, the fifth Chabad Rebbe, asked him if the cell had enough room for three people, which implies that Rabbi Sholom Dovber believed that they had appeared as souls in bodies.

=== Release ===
A detailed summary of the investigation, including Shneur Zalman’s defense, was presented to the Czar. Although the local governors had found no concrete evidence of criminal activity, they continued to harbor suspicions.

The Czar, lacking incriminating evidence, acted in obedience to justice and common sense. On November 16, 1798, the Czar ordered that Shneur Zalman and all arrested Hasidim must be freed. Orders were subsequently sent to the governors to release all detainees, though they were directed to keep them under surveillance.

On November 27 (19 Kislev 5559), Shneur Zalman was released but was mistakenly brought to the house of a Misnagid. This man verbally abused Shneur Zalman for several hours before the Hasidim found him that night (20 Kislev). The Hasidim wanted to take revenge on the Misnagid but Shneur Zalman discouraged them.

The day Shneur Zalman was released, 19 Kislev, was the anniversary of the death of his teacher, the Maggid of Mezritch. In a letter, he lent great significance to the day, considering it a holiday for anyone who followed in the path of the Baal Shem Tov. He attributed the success to the merit of the fundraising for the Holy Land. Following his release, Shneur Zalman wrote to his Hasidim urging restraint and discouraging statements insulting the memory of the Vilna Gaon, seeking to moderate belligerent responses and pursue peace. The date of his release from prison, 19-20 Kislev (20 being when he left the Misnagid’s house), is celebrated by Chabad Hasidim as the festival of redemption.

=== Observances ===
Festive meals are held and good resolutions are taken to strengthen Torah study and spreading Hasidut in a brotherly manner. It is customary to split all the 63 tractates of the Talmud amongst the community members.

Tachanun is not recited. The last verses of Psalm 55, "He has redeemed my soul in peace," are traditionally sung on this day. These verses are a reference to the experienced by the Alter Rebbe on this day. Rabbi Shneur Zalman said: "Whoever participates in my celebration will merit to see nachas from his descendants." The day is also marked by many other non-Chabad Chassidic groups.

== Other significant events ==
Rabbi Yaakov of Marvege (Korebil), a twelfth-century Tosafist and Kabbalist, wrote a book called "Responsa from Heaven," in which he recorded halachic (Jewish legal) responsa he said he had heard from Heaven. After discussing the concept that one should study Torah only after immersion in a mikveh (ritual bath), he describes 19 Kislev as "a day that will herald good tidings."

19 Kislev 1744 - considered to mark the day Rabbi Shneur Zalman was conceived; he was born exactly nine months later, on 18 Elul.

19 Kislev 1772 - the Maggid of Mezeritch, Rabbi Dov Ber, the Alter Rebbe’s teacher, and the successor of the Baal Shem Tov, passed away on this day.

19 Kislev 1809 - the birth date of the Alter Rebbe of the Hasidic dynasty of Zychlin, Shmuel Abba. It was celebrated as the birth date of the dynasty until 95% of its followers were murdered in The Holocaust.

19 Kislev 2011 - the day the Iraq War ended.

19 Kislev 2017 - U.S. president Donald Trump pronounced Jerusalem as the capital of the State of Israel, and that the U.S. Embassy would be relocated to the city.
