= Nigun =

Form of Jewish religious song or tune

A nigun (Hebrew: ניגון, 'tune' or 'melody'; pl. nigunim) or niggun (pl. niggun) is a form of Ashkenazi Jewish vocal music sung in group settings. Nigunim are melodic tunes, often using repetitive non-lexical vocables such as "bim-bim-bam", "lai-lai-lai", "yai-yai-yai", or "ai-ai-ai" rather than with formal lyrics. Sometimes, a nigun is expressed as a mystical musical form of Jewish prayer or glossolalia. Hebrew Biblical verses or quotes from other classical Jewish texts are sometimes sung repetitively to form a nigun. Some nigunim are sung as prayers of lament, while others may be joyous or victorious in theme.

== Musar Movement Nigunim ==
The Musar movement has also used nigunim, based on the realization of how music affects the inner (i.e., spiritual) life. In the 19th century, the Musar movement developed its own distinctive nigun chanting traditions. In the 21st century, nigunim may be used at the start and end of Musar study sessions, potentially fostering an emotional Musar experience.

== See also ==
- Niggun of Four Stanzas

Nigunim by:

- Nachman of Breslov
- The Kaliver Rebbe
- Moshe Zvi of Savran

Other Jewish spiritual practices:

- Jewish meditation
- Dveikut

== General and cited references ==
- Pinson, DovBer, Inner Rhythms: The Kabbalah of Music, Jason Aronson, Inc. 2000. Excellent chapters on the history of Jewish music, the various types and uses of Hasidic nigunim, etc.
- Stern, Shmuel, Shirat HaLev (Trans The Song of the Heart) Translated by Gita Levi.
