= Shlomo Dubnov =

American-Israeli computer music researcher and composer

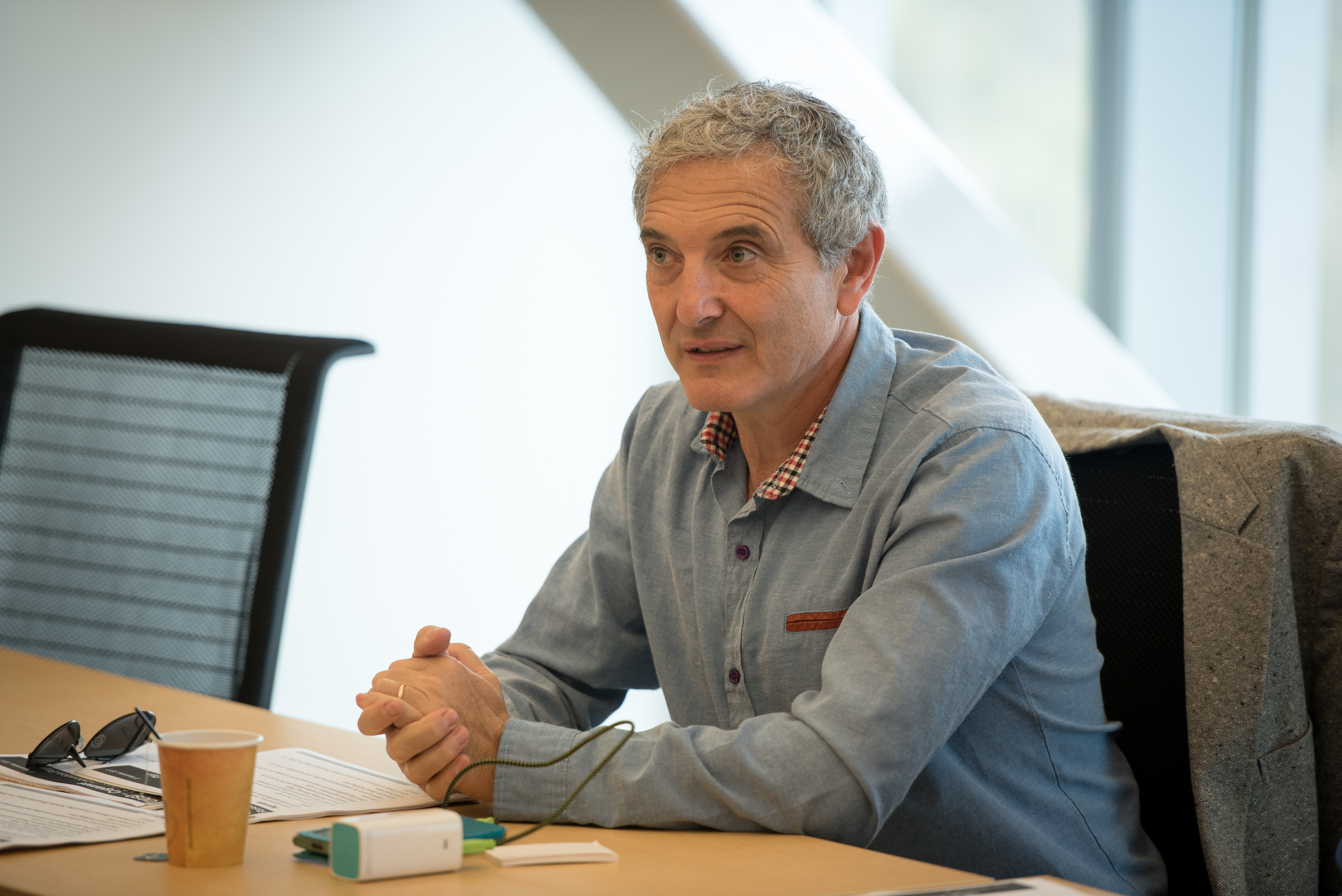

Shlomo Dubnov (Hebrew: שלמה דובנוב) is an American-Israeli computer music researcher and composer. He is a professor in the Music Department and Affiliate Professor in Computer Science and Engineering and a founding faculty of the Halıcıoğlu Data Science Institute in the University of California, San Diego, where he has been since 2003. He is the Director of the Center for Research in Entertainment and Learning (CREL) at UC San Diego's Qualcomm Institute.

== Biography ==
Born in Ukraine in 1962, Shlomo Dubnov is a researcher and composer. Dubnov's education bridges electrical engineering (at the Technion), computer science (at the Hebrew University), and music (at the Academy of Music and Dance in Jerusalem). Dubnov was familiar with electroacoustic music when he learned about computer music as a field of research during a workshop by Jonathan Berger around 1990. In 1994, he founded the "Israel Computers and Music Forum".

Dubnov graduated from Jerusalem Academy of Music and Dance in composition and holds a PhD from computer science in Hebrew University of Jerusalem. He is a graduate of the Israel Defence Forces (IDF) Talpiot program. Prior to joining UCSD, he served as a researcher at IRCAM, Paris, and headed the multimedia track for the Department of Communication Systems Engineering at Ben-Gurion University of the Negev. He received fellowships from Natural Science's Distinguished Scientist (Dozor Program), Ben-Gurion University of the Negev, 2019, the IdEX Excellence in Research, LaBRI, University of Bordeaux, France, 2016, Heiwa-Nakajima-Zaidan, Keio University, Japan 2014, Chateaubriand, IRCAM, 2014, and Eshkol Fellowship, Ministry of Science, Israel, 1993.

== Research ==
He is best known for his research on musical timbre, Machine improvisation, Computational creativity and Stylometry of music. He is also known for his contributions to the field of Computer Audition by inventing the method of information dynamics and use of Bispectrum and non-linear extensions of Spectral flatness. His new algorithm, called "Ouch AI", combines Music Latent Diffusion Model (MusicLDM) with Large Language Models to create music out of poetry.

Google Scholar Profile

== Selected publications ==
Papers

- Dubnov, S., Tishby, N., Cohen, D., (1996), "Polyspectra as measures of sound texture and timbre", Journal of New Music Research 26 (4), 277–314, Best Paper award, Computer Music Association, 1996
- P Herrera-Boyer, G Peeters, S Dubnov (2003), "Automatic classification of musical instrument sounds", Journal of New Music Research 32 (1), 3–21
- Cont, A., and Dubnov, S., (2007) "GUIDAGE: A Fast Audio Query Guided Assemblage", ICMC Best Presentation Award, 2007 "Computer Audition Lab".
- Dubnov, S. & Chen, K. & Huang, K., (2022), "Deep Music Information Dynamics", Journal of Creative Music Systems 1(1), 2022
- Wu, Y., Chen, K., Zhang, T., Hui, Y., Berg-Kirkpatrick, T., Dubnov, S., (2023), "Large-scale contrastive language-audio pretraining (CLAP) with feature fusion and keyword-to-caption augmentation", ICASSP 2023 IEEE International Conference on Acoustics, Speech and Signal Processing
- Dubnov, S., Gokul, V., Assayag, G., (2023), "Switching Machine Improvisation Models by Latent Transfer Entropy Criteria", Physical Sciences Forum, vol. 5, no. 1, pp. 49, 2023.
- Chen, K., Wu, Y., Liu, H., Nezhurina, M., Berg-Kirkpatrick, T., Dubnov, S., (2024), "MusicLDM: Enhancing novelty in text-to-music generation using beat-synchronous mixup strategies", ICASSP 2024 IEEE International Conference on Acoustics, Speech and Signal Processing

Books

- Argamon, S., Burns, K., Dubnov, S. (2010). The structure of style: Algorithmic approaches to understanding manner and meaning. Springer.
- Dubnov, S., Bruns, K., Kiyoki, Y. (2016). Cross-Cultural Multimedia Computing: Semantic and Aesthetic Modeling. Springer Briefs in Computer Science.
- Dubnov, S., Greer, R. (2023). Deep and Shallow: Machine Learning for Music and Audio. Routledge.
- Dubnov, S. and D. Zou (2025). Lecture Notes in Deep Learning: Theoretical Insights into an Artificial Mind. World Scientific.
