= Zychlin (Hasidic dynasty) =

Polish Hasidic dynasty

Zychlin (Hebrew: זיכלין) is a Hasidic dynasty originating from the town of Żychlin, Poland, where it was founded by Shmuel Abba Zychlinski (1809–1879). Zychlin is a branch of Peshischa Hasidism, as Shmuel Abba Zychlinski was a leading disciple of Simcha Bunim of Peshischa (1765-1827).

== Origins and ideology ==
The first Rebbe of Zychlin, Rabbi Shmuel Abba, taught that one needs to not only repent but repent through the learning of Jewish holy subjects. Reb Zelig was a relative of the Sabba Kadisha of Strikov, Reb Fishel, going to visit him and taking his young son Shmuel Abba with him. Rabbi Shmuel Abba was known as the Ilui ("genius") of Luvitch and many scholars praised his depth and understanding. When Rabbi Shmuel Abba was older he learned at the Peshischa yeshiva which was led at that time by Rabbi Simcha Bunim of Peshischa. He considered himself one of Rabbi Simcha Bunim's disciples.

Rabbi Shmuel Abba had a small following of Hasidim and lived at his father-in-law's house, but when he moved to Zychlin for monetary reasons he acquired a larger following. Shmuel Abba was known as a miracle worker. Shmuel Abba spent time in jail because his detractors were upset that he practiced practical Kabbalah.

Ninety-five percent of Zychliner Hasidim perished during the Holocaust, the last Rebbes dying at the hands of the Nazis.

== Dynastic line ==
- Grand Rabbi Shmuel Abba Zychlinski of Zichlin (1809–1879), also known as the Alter Rebbe of Zychlin
  - Grand Rabbi Moshe Natanel Zychlinski (d. 1912), son of Rabbi Shmuel Abba
    - Grand Rabbi Saadyia Hanoch Zychlinski of Zychlin-Strikov (1875-?), son of Rabbi Moshe Natanel. Murdered by the Nazi regime.
      - Rabbi Efraim Meir Gad Zychlinski, author of Lehav Eish. Murdered by the Nazi regime.
      - Grand Rabbi Moshe Natanel Zychlinski of Zychlin-Strikov-Lodz. Murdered by the Nazi regime.
    - Grand Rabbi Menachem Yedidah Zychlinski of Zychlin (1872-1940), son of Rabbi Moshe Natanel. Murdered by the Nazi regime.
      - Grand Rabbi Shmuel Avraham Abba Zychlinski of Zychlin (d. 1942), son of Rabbi Menachem Yedidah. Murdered by the Nazi regime.

== Pictures of 3rd Generation Rebbes ==
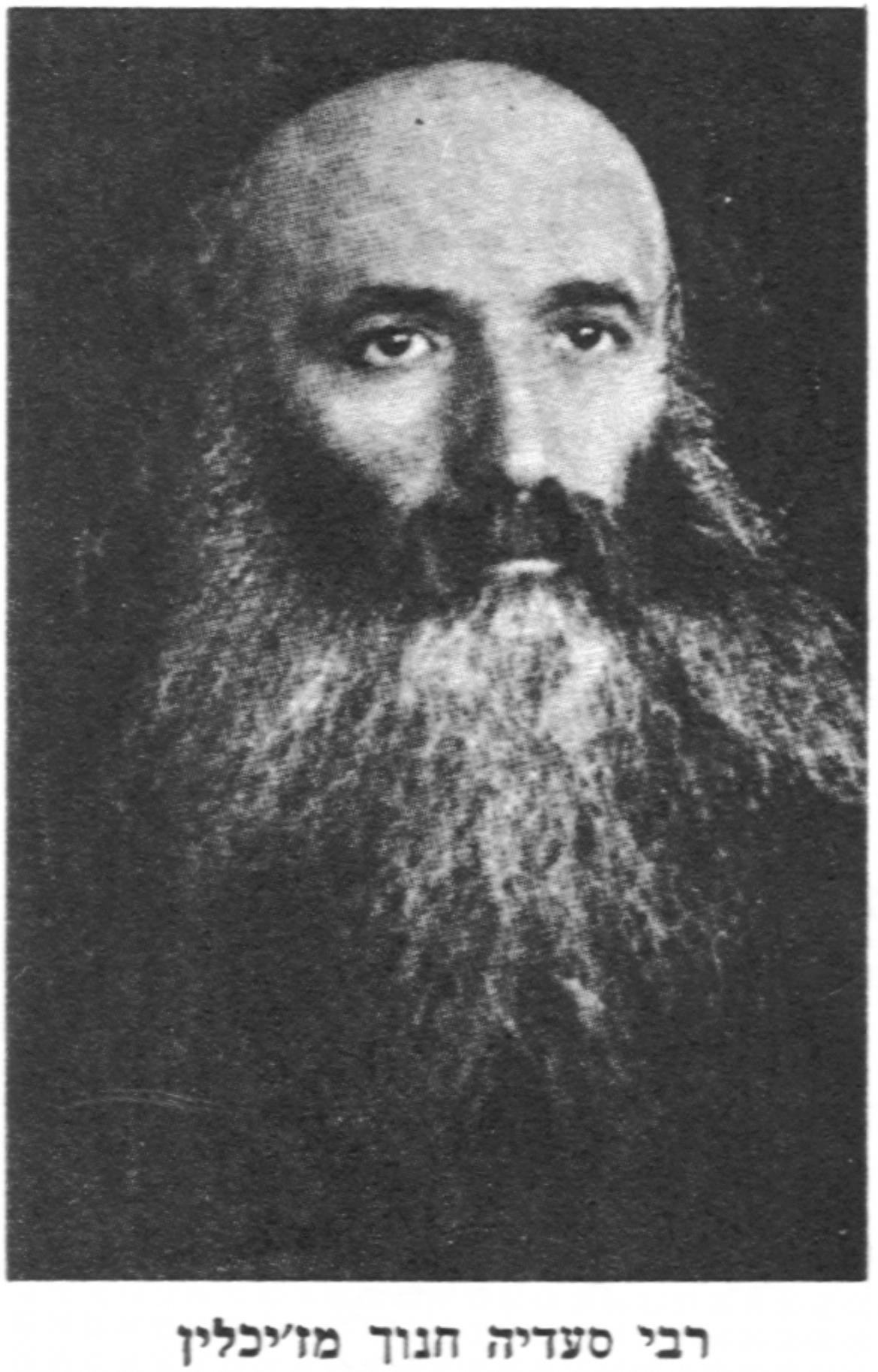
Rav Saadia Chanoch

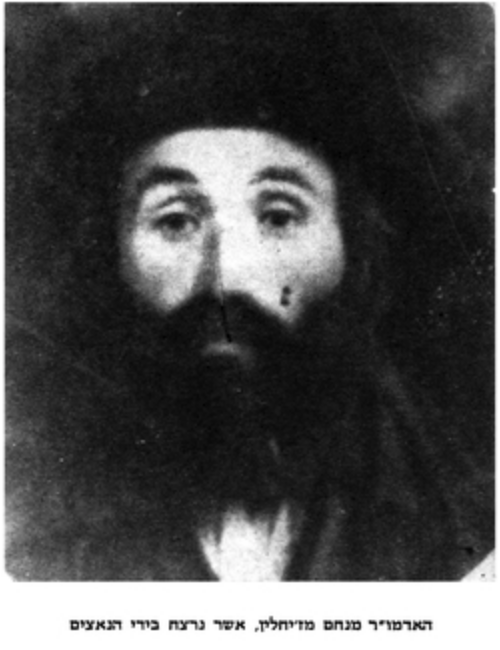
Rebbe Menachem Yedidya

== See also ==
- History of the Jews in Poland
