= Tanya Rabbati =

16th-century Italian code of Jewish law

Note: Tanya, an important work of Hasidic Judaism, is an unrelated book with a similar name. For other uses, see Tanya (disambiguation).

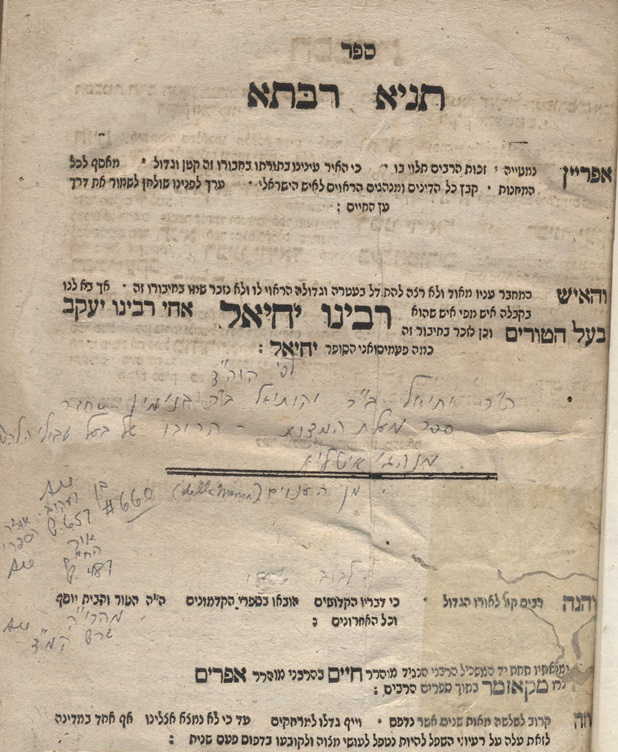
Title page of an 1800 edition of Tanya Rabbati.

Tanya Rabbati is an anonymous work on Jewish law first published in Italy, in 1514.

Tanya Rabbati discusses Shabbat and the Jewish Holidays. The work is named for its first word, "Tanya", which is Aramaic for "it is stated in a baraita." It is believed to have been authored by Jehiel ben Jekutheil Anav (full name: Jehiel ben Jekutheil ben Benjamin Ha-Rofe Anav), a 13th-century Rabbinic author, manuscript copyist, and liturgical poet. The work was first published in Mantua, and was re-printed in Cremona, 1565, and later in two other editions.

== Relationship to Shibbolei ha-Leket ==
Shibbolei ha-Leket (Hebrew, "Ears of the Harvest"), the first Italian Jewish codification of Jewish law, is an earlier work that is similar in scope and content, but more detailed and further elaborated. Shibbolei ha-Leket is concerned with the liturgy, the Passover Haggadah, and laws pertaining to Shabbat and the Jewish Holidays. It was authored by Zedekiah ben Abraham Anav, a 13th-century Italian Talmudist. The work was culled from many Rishonim. Anav "systematized his material skilfully, gave it a concise as well as popular form, and judiciously discriminated between conflicting opinions and decisions, giving preference to those that seemed to him true." It is divided into 372 paragraphs, plus appendices and responsa on topics such as circumcision, mourning, tzitzit, slaughtering, inheritance, and interest. An abridged version was published in Venice (Daniel Bomberg) in 1545, and a complete version in Vilna in 1886.

== Viewpoints on authorship of the Shibolei HaLeKet / Tanya Rabbati ==
- Many scholars believe that the Tanya Rabbati is, in fact, an abbreviated version of Shibbolei ha-Leket. In addition to the similarity in content, Zedekiah ben Abraham Anav and Jehiel ben Jekutheil Anav were in fact related.

However, other views exist.

- S. H. Kook believes that Tanya Rabbati is the first edition of Shibbolei ha-Leket. In this view, Jehiel copied Shibbolei ha-Leket and added his own notes and ideas.
- In contrast, S. K. Mirsky believes that Jehiel is the original author of Tanya Rabbati. In Mirsky's view, the many similarities of the Tanya Rabbati to Shibbolei ha-Leket come from the fact that both Jehiel and Zedekiah wrote their works based on the teachings of Judah ben Benjamin Anav, Jehiel's uncle.
- An 1800 printed edition of Tanya Rabbati attributes its authorship to Rabbeinu Yechiel, the brother of Jacob ben Asher (the author of the Arba'ah Turim). As it says on the inside cover (loose translation):

The man, a most modest author who didn't want to accept a crown of greatness, but it would become him, would not want it known that he authored this work. However, we have received a tradition from generation to generation that it is Rabbeinu Yechiel, brother of Rabbeinu Yaakov Baal HaTurim. Indeed, within this work it is said more than once "I am the Sofer Yechiel."

However, there is a hand-written notation below this attributing the work to Jehiel ben Jekuthiel Anav.
