= Dubnow Garden =

Public park and garden in Tel Aviv, Israel

Coordinates: 32°4′40.15″N 34°47′4.11″E

Dubnov Garden
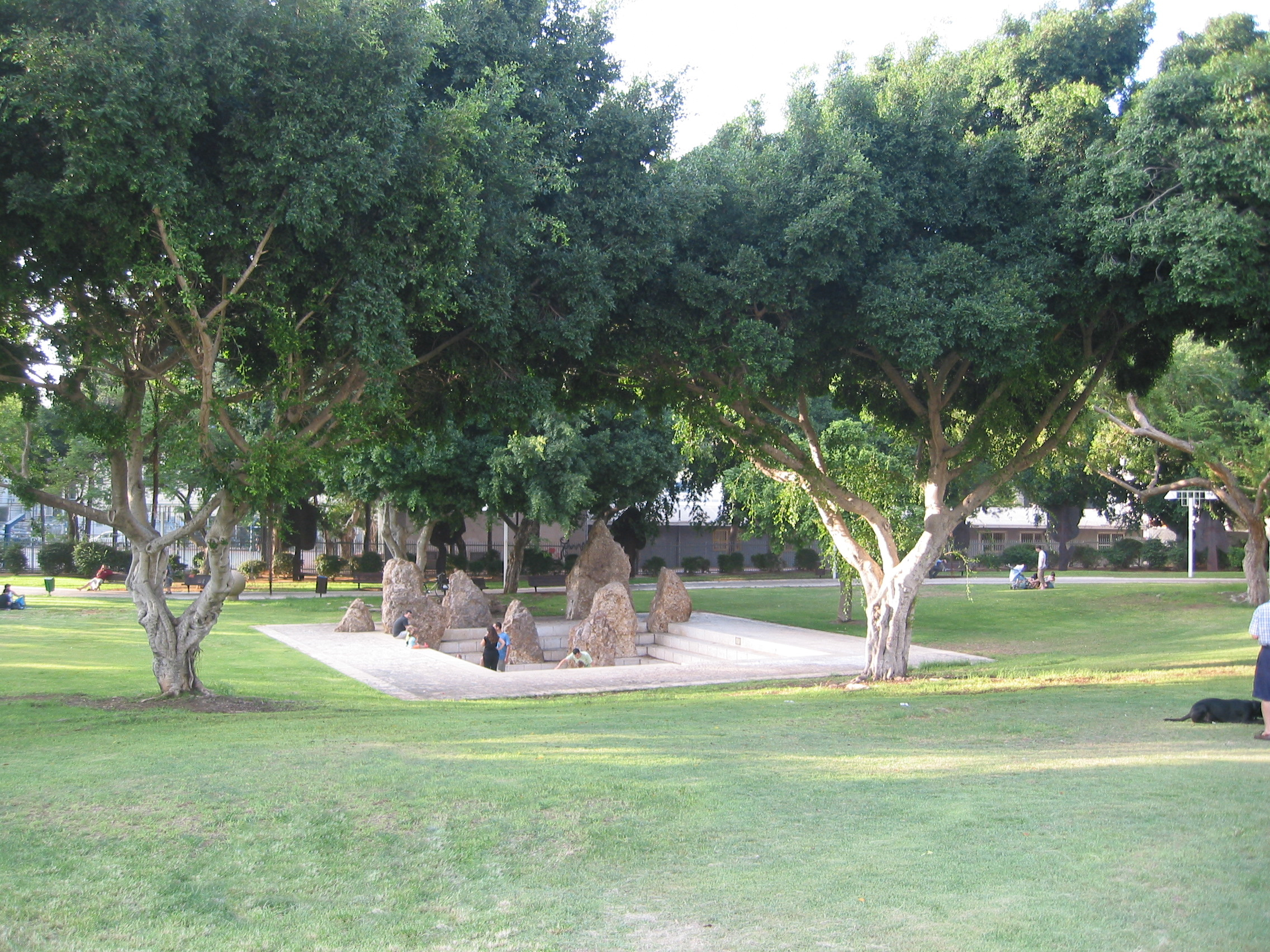
- Interactive map of Dubnov Garden
- Type: Urban park
- Location: Tel Aviv, Israel
- Operator: Tel Aviv municipality
- Status: Open all year

Dubnow Garden (alternative spelling Dubnov) (Hebrew: גינת דובנוב) is a public park and garden located in the center of Tel Aviv, Israel, lying at the back of the Tel Aviv Performing Arts Center. The park is named for Simon Dubnow, a Jewish Belarusian historian, writer and activist. The street sharing its name (Dubnow Street) makes up the western border of the garden.

Dubnow Garden is very popular with young families, students and dog owners. It contains playgrounds and outdoor exercise equipment.
