= Judah ben Benjamin Anav =

Rabbi Judah ben Benjamin Anav (Hebrew: יהודה בן בנימין ענו or ריבב"ן; approximately 1215-1280) was one of the Rishonim in Italy. He wrote a known commentary on the main book of Isaac Alfasi, a commentary to tractate Shekalim of the Mishna and on Sheiltot by Achai Gaon. He also wrote a book about Shechita and Terefah. His cousin, Zedekiah ben Abraham Anaw, was also his student and quoted him in his book many times.
