= Simha of Speyer =

13th century German rabbi and tosafist

Simḥa ben Samuel of Speyer (13th century) was a German rabbi and tosafist. Neither the year of his birth nor that of his death is known. He was one of the leading signatories of the Takkanot Shum. He was a nephew of the director (parnas) Kalonymus, a student of R. Eliezer of Metz, and a colleague of Eliezer ben Joel ha-Levi.

Simha was the author of the following works:

- Commentary on the treatise Horayot (quoted in Tosafot Horayot 4b, s.v. Keri)
- Tosafot and novellæ on the Talmud;
- Seder Olam, a work divided into paragraphs and containing decisions, comments on Talmudic passages, and regulations for religious practice (quoted in Haggahot Maimoniyyot, Ishut 6:14, Tefillah 9). All the responsa and decisions which the earlier authors quote in the name of R. Simḥah were probably taken from this work.
- Tikkun Shetarot, on agreements and documents (quoted in Haggahot Maimoniyyot, Gerushin 4:12)
- Sections ("she'arim") on the laws of blessings (quoted in Haggahot Maimoniyyot Berakhot 8)

Aside from these works decisions and responsa by Simḥah are mentioned in the responsa collection of R. Meir of Rothenburg (Nos. 573, 927, 931, 932) and in the works of several older authors.
