= Eliezer ben Samuel =

French rabbi (died 1198)

- אליעזר בן שמואל
- Born: 1140
- Died: 1237
- Other names: רבי אליעזר ממיץ

Eliezer ben Samuel of Metz (died 1198) was a Tosafist and the author of the halachic work Sefer Yereim (Vilna 1892). An abridgment of this work was produced by Benjamin ben Abraham Anaw.

== See also ==
- Moses ben Meir of Ferrara
