= Rastrelli Cello Quartet =

German classical music ensemble

The Rastrelli Cello Quartet was founded in 2002 in Stuttgart, Germany, by three Russian and one Belarusian cellists. It is a string ensemble consisting of four cellos.

The group took their name from the prominent 18th-century architect, Francesco Bartolomeo Rastrelli, who was associated with the city of Stuttgart. The Rastrelli Cello Quartet performs in Europe, the U.S. and Russia.

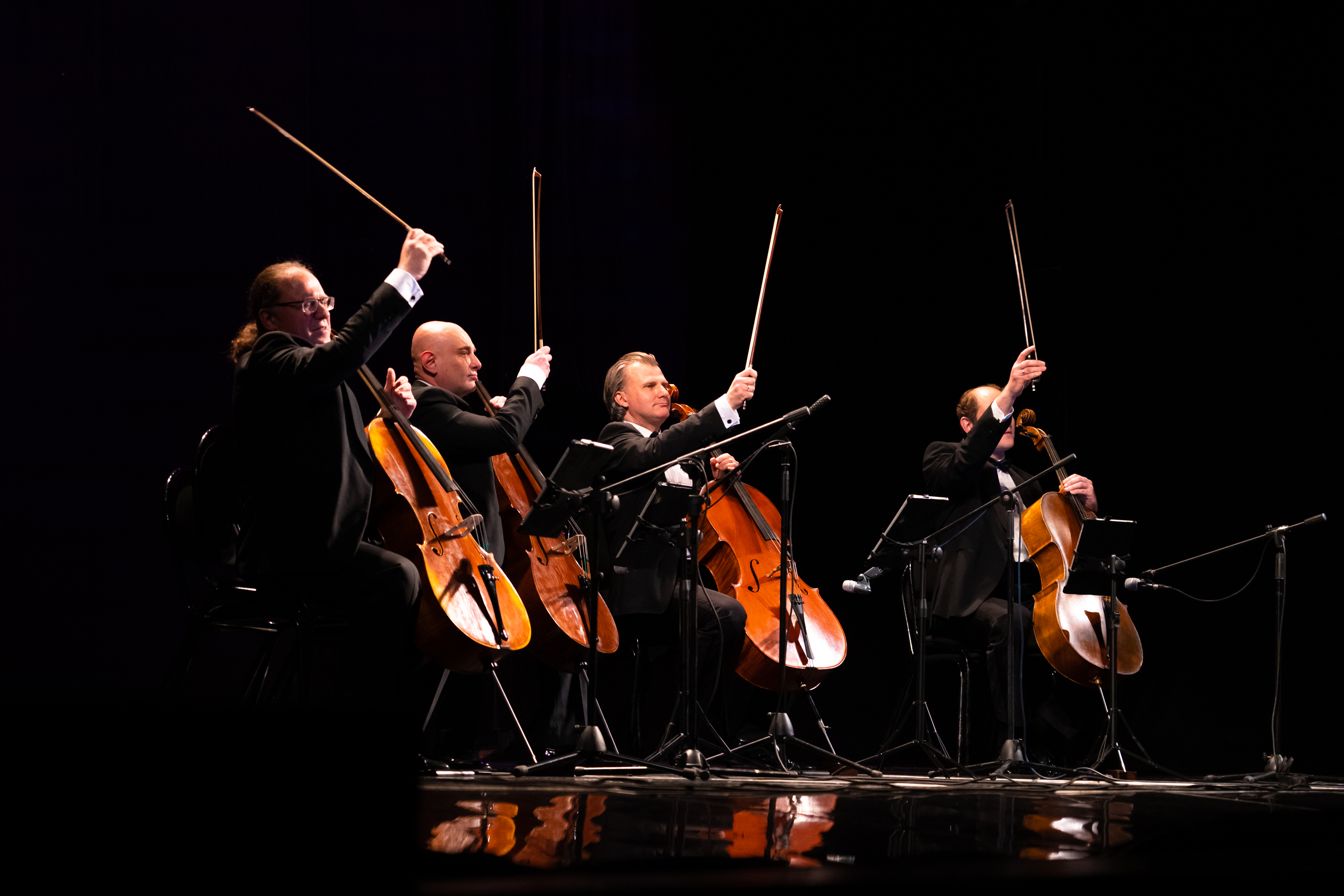
The RCQ live in concert 2023

== Recordings ==
- Rastrelli Vol.1 - 2003 - by Amphion Records
- Cello in Jazz - 2005 - swing, jazz, and beyond
- Cello in Classics (vol. 3) - 2006
- Cello in Buenos Aires (Vol. 4) - 2008 - Piazzolla Arrangements for Cello Quartet with Piano - feat. pianist Ann Chang
- Cello in Sentimental Mood (Vol. 5) - 2011
- Volume 51/5 - 2011 - arrangements of classical works
- Cello Effect - 2015 - well-known pieces of classical repertoire, jazz, and more - Genuin Records
- Klezmer Bridges - 2015 - Giora Feidman & Rastelli Cello Quartet - by Pianissimo Music
- Feidman plays Beatles - 2017 - Giora Feidman & Rastelli Cello Quartet - by Pianissimo Music
- Cello & Beatles - 2018 - unique arrangements of Beatles pop classics
- A Tribute To Piazzolla - Giora Feidman & Rastelli Cello Quartet - 2021 - by Macc Records
- "Rastrelli Effect - 2022 - original compositions from each quartet member - by Solo Musica
