= Jehiel ben Jekuthiel Anav =

Jewish scholar, poet, and copyist

Jehiel ben Jekuthiel Anav (Yechiel ben Yekutiel (Hebrew: יחיאל בן יקותיאל) Anav), also referred to as Jehiel ben Jekuthiel ben Benjamin HaRofe, who lived in Rome during the thirteenth and fourteenth centuries, was a famous scholar, poet, paytan and copyist.

He is best known as the author of Maalot HaMiddot, a work of musar literature.

He was the copyist of the Leiden Jerusalem Talmud, "the only extant complete manuscript of Jerusalem Talmud." This project, which he did in 1289, also involved correcting errors in the source document, another copy.

== Career ==
The Leiden Talmud was written in 1289 by Rabbi Jehiel ben Rabbi Jekuthiel ben rabbi Benjamin HaRofe. Jehiel lived in Rome during the thirteenth and fourteenth centuries where he was a famous scholar, writer, poet (of Piyyutim/liturgical poetry), and a copyist. He is best known as the author of the book of piety Maalot ha-Middot.

Yehiel stated at the beginning of the (Leiden) manuscript that he finished writing Zeraim and Moed on the 12th day of the month of Shevat, and added that he completed Nashim and Nizikin one and a half months later.

=== Other writings ===
- Tanya Rabbati, a work related to Shibbolei HaLeket (Hebrew, "The Gleaned Ears")

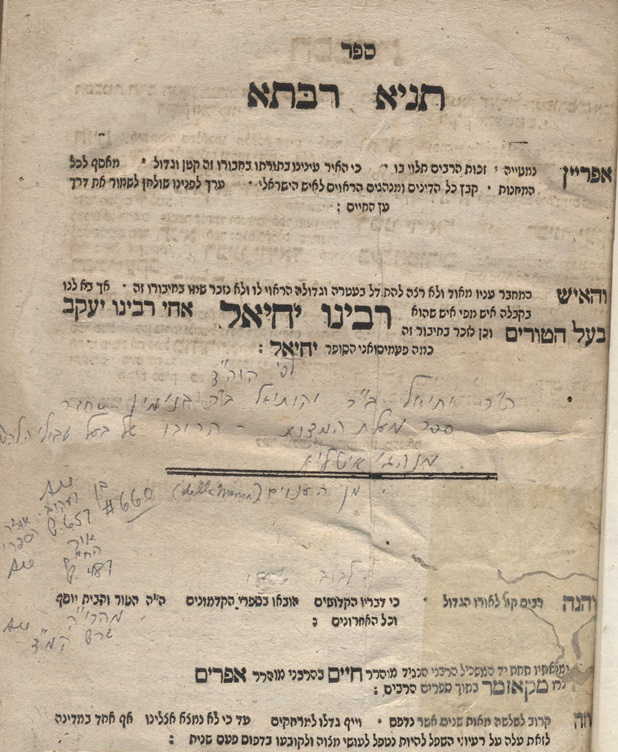
Title page of an 1800 edition of Tanya Rabbati

- Hilkhot Sheḥitah - on the laws of ritual slaughter (in manuscript).

== Maalot HaMidot ==
The Maalot HaMiddot (Hebrew: מעלות המדות), written during the 13th century while its author was in Rome, Italy, was originally published in Constantinople as "Beit Middot" in 1511/1512; what is now Maalot HaMiddot was published 1556 in Cremona.

This musar sefer begins and ends with a poetic work, and describes 24 character trait elevations in ethical conduct. It is based on talmudic, midrashic and other sources. It describes the various benefits of certain positive character traits - and the detriments of their opposites.

Maalot HaMidot was hand-copied, later printed and reprinted, including translated into Ladino. Among the translations into other languages is Rabbi Shraga Silverstein's "The Book of Middoth."

=== The twenty four middos and their opposites ===
1. Knowing G-d
2. Loving G-d & One's Fellow
3. Fear of G-d & Parents
4. Torah Study & the Fulfilment of the Mitzvos
5. Kindness
6. Charity
7. Prayer
8. Humility vs. Pride
9. Modesty vs. Immorality
10. Shame vs. Arrogance
11. Faithfulness vs. Theft
12. Honesty vs. Deceitfulness
13. Compassion vs. Cruelty
14. Amicability vs. Anger
15. "A Good Name"
16. Yetzer Tov vs. Yetzer Hara
17. Teshuva (Repentance)
18. Wisdom vs. Foolishness
19. Wealth
20. Diligence vs. Laziness
21. Easily Satisfied vs. Gluttony
22. Generosity vs. Stinginess
23. Derech Eretz
24. Peace vs. Contention & Gossip

== Leiden Jerusalem Talmud ==
Jehiel ben Jekuthiel Anav was the copyist who hand-copied what today is known as the Leiden Jerusalem Talmud.

The Leiden Jerusalem Talmud (also known as the Leiden Talmud) is a medieval copy of the Jerusalem Talmud. The manuscript was written in 1289 CE, meaning it is the oldest complete manuscript of the Jerusalem Talmud in the world. The manuscript is also the only surviving complete (non-printed) manuscript of the Jerusalem Talmud. It is dated with the Hebrew year 5049 (Anno Mundi).

The manuscript receives its name from the University of Leiden where it has been kept since 1609.

Yechiel states at the beginning of the manuscript that he finished writing Zeraim and Moed on the 12th day of the month of Shevat. He subsequently states that he finished Nashim and Nizikin one and a half months later; the latter is two of the six orders of the Jerusalem Talmud in about six weeks.

=== Errors within the text ===
There are several errors throughout the manuscript which is consistent with many other Hebrew manuscripts of that period. Errors in Hebrew manuscripts were common since access to texts such as the Talmud was limited. This was partially due to the absence of printing. However most notably, Talmudic texts were rare since they were outlawed on several occasions. The most prominent example of this would be the Vatican decree to burn all Talmudic manuscripts. This decree led to the Paris book burnings of 1244. Yehiel writes that he copied the text from a different manuscript that was filled with scribal errors. However, Yechiel noted, he tried to correct as many errors as possible, and he humbly states 'I know that I have not corrected even half of the mistakes' and begs for the readers forgiveness.

=== Bomberg printing of the Jerusalem Talmud ===
During 1523-1524 the Jerusalem Talmud was printed for the first time in Venice by Daniel Bomberg. Jacob ben Hayyim ibn Adonijah, the editor of the Bomberg edition of the Jerusalem Talmud, used the Leiden Manuscript along with three other manuscripts as the basis of the printed edition of the Jerusalem Talmud. However, Jacob ben Hayyim ibn Adoniyahu considered the Leiden Manuscript the least accurate copy of the Jerusalem Talmud. The other three manuscripts of the Jerusalem Talmud used for the printing of Bomberg's edition of the Talmud have been lost, "with the exception of the Yerushalmi to tractate Horayot which was printed by Bomberg in his edition of the Babylonian Talmud.

=== University of Leiden ===
After the publication of the Bomberg edition of the Jerusalem Talmud, the Leiden Talmud was lost for around three hundred years. It was only to be rediscovered in the mid nineteenth century in the Library of the city of Leiden. It had been entrusted to the Library by the notable Protestant scholar Joseph Scaliger who was a professor at Leiden.

The Leiden Talmud was transferred to Leiden University Library along with the rest of Scaliger's collection of manuscripts.

=== Recent history ===
Recently the Academy of Hebrew Language published an exact transcription of the Leiden Talmud along with carefully annotated corrections.

In 1973 the manuscript was restored and rebound. Leiden University Libraries has made available a digital version of both volumes in its Digital Collections.
