= Eugene Dubnov =

Jewish-born Russian and English poet

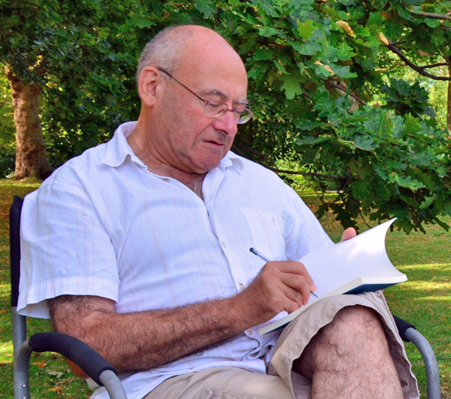
- Dubnov in 2015, Regent's Park, London
- Born: Zalman Dubnov; 2 November 1949; Tallinn, Estonia
- Died: 5 August 2019 (aged 69); Jerusalem, Israel
- Education: London University
- Occupations: Poet, short-story writer, and memoirist
- Relatives: Simon Dubnow
- Writing career
- Language: Russian, English
- Genres: Poetry, novels
- Website: eugenedubnov.co.uk

Eugene Dubnov (born Zalman Dubvov, Russian: Евгений (Юджин) Дубно́в, Hebrew: יוג'ין דובנוב; 2 November 1949 – 5 August 2019) was a Jewish-born Russian and English poet, novelist and memoirist.

== Life and career ==
Eugene Dubnov was born on 2 November 1949, in Tallinn, Estonia (then a part of the former USSR). His mother tongue was Russian, and he spoke English fluently since his childhood spent in Riga, Latvia (then a part of the former USSR). He studied at the Moscow State University, at the Bar-Ilan University, Israel, and at the London University where from he was graduated (psychology and English Literature). He then worked on his PhD thesis in the London University (Russian Literature and English Literature) but did not bring it to a close.

In 1971, Eugene Dubnov repatriated to Israel, served in the Israeli army and settled in Jerusalem where he had been living and teaching English to the day of his death, with a break for education in United Kingdom in middle 1970s.

Dubnov was a holder of the Israeli Presidential Merit Scholarship in 1972, 1974, and 1999. He also was a scholar of the Tel Aviv Literature and Art Foundation in 1975 and 2001.

== Publications ==
Eugene Dubnov published his poems and short stories in Russian magazines, almanacs and newspapers in Israel, Europe and worldwide; among them, in Kontinent (Paris), La pensée russe (Paris), 22 (Tel Aviv), Novy Zhournal (The New Review, New York), (Sagittarius, New Jersey), Novoe russkoe slovo (New Russian Word, New York), Vozrojdénie (The Renaissance, Paris), Vremya i my (We and Our Time, US), Grani (Frankfurt am Main), etc.

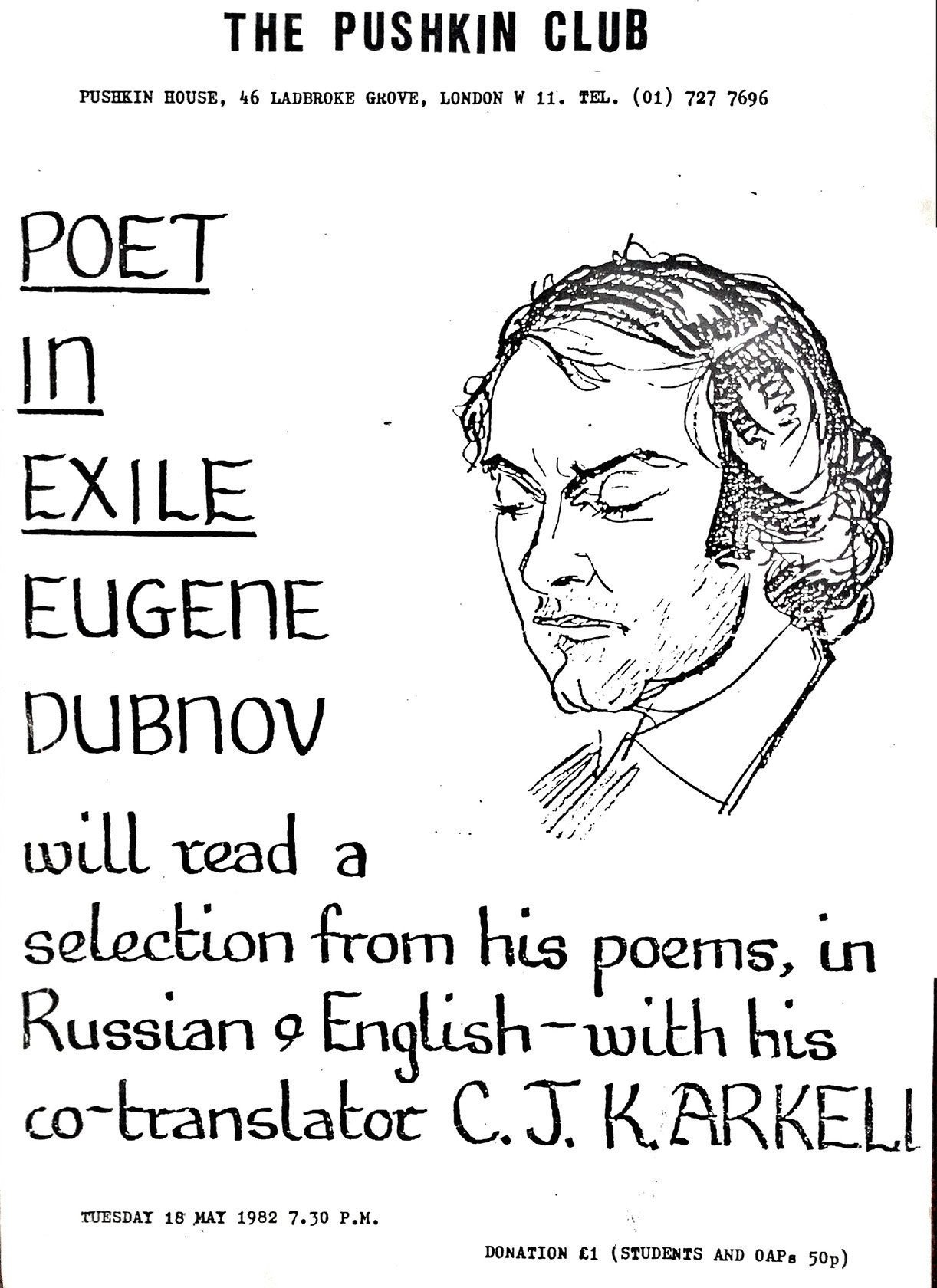

He also published his original and translated poems, novels and memoirs in numerous English language issues all over the world, among them, in The Times Literary Supplement, The Canadian Journal of Poetry and Critical Writings, Poetry (Chicago), Chicago Review, Yale Literary Magazine, Poetry London, The London Magazine, North American Review, Poetry Ireland Review, New England Review, Oxford Poetry, Mid-American Review, New Wales Reader, Canadian Literature, The Massachusetts Review, Poetry New Zealand, Mississippi Review, Westerly, Chapman, Mediterranean Poetry, St. Petersburg Review, The Jerusalem Post, Grain, and others.

== Books ==
- Е. Дубнов. Рыжие монеты ("The Auburn Coins"), poems, (Goldfinch Press, London, 1978),
- Е. Дубнов. Небом и землею ("By Heaven and Earth"), poems, Amber Press, London, 1984).
- Eugene Dubnov. Thousand-Year Minutes (Shoestring Press, UK, 2013).
- Eugene Dubnov. Never Out of Reach (memoirs) (Clemson University Press, USA, 2015 and Liverpool University Press, UK, 2015).
- Eugene Dubnov. Beyond the Boundaries (Shoestring Press, UK, 2016).

== Quotes ==
"Rich in texture, poignant, subtle, and beautifully made, the poems of Eugene Dubnov are long overdue for a collection in English." — X.J. Kennedy. In: Eugene Dubnov. Never Out of Reach (memoirs) (Clemson University Press, USA, 2015 and Liverpool University Press, UK, 2015).

"Eugene Dubnov’s poetry is remarkable for its tight structure and dense, complex texture." — W.D. Snodgrass In: Eugene Dubnov. Never Out of Reach (memoirs) (Clemson University Press, USA, 2015 and Liverpool University Press, UK, 2015).

"Over thirty years ago, when Eugene Dubnov was mulling over a doctoral thesis on Mandelstam, I first read his poetry and was astonished that such a genuine talent was subordinating itself to analyzing others' talents. But a Russian poet in post-Soviet space or exile has few of the paths to recognition available to an earlier generation — being imprisoned, shot or deported. This volume (Beyond the Boundaries) has Dubnov at his best, and with each poem beautifully mirrored in English, too. It is still clear that he is an heir to Mandelstam (and to Joseph Brodsky, as well), but his is an original voice, moulding the Russian language with finesse and sensitivity." — Donald Rayfield, Professor Emeritus, University of London. In: Eugene Dubnov. Beyond the Boundaries (Shoestring Press, UK, 2016)).

"The poems of Eugene Dubnov are poignant, subtle, and beautifully made. At home in several cultures, Dubnov is a true original." — X.J. Kennedy. In: Eugene Dubnov. Beyond the Boundaries (Shoestring Press, UK, 2016)).

"A real gift." — Prof. John Bayley, Oxford. In: Eugene Dubnov. Beyond the Boundaries (Shoestring Press, UK, 2016)).

"To the religious believers, to artists or merely to sensitive readers with a profound feeling for nature, these daring poems of faith will confirm Eugene Dubnov's importance as a poet in exalted tradition of Dante, Blake, George Herbert, Father Hopkins and W. B. Yeats."— Anne Stevenson. In: Eugene Dubnov. Beyond the Boundaries (Shoestring Press, UK, 2016)).

== Literature ==
- Lea Vladimirova. "…All kind of thirsts I’ve quenched by my word…" (on Eugene Dubnov poetry collection 'By Heaven and Earth', 1984). Novyi Zhurnal / The New Review No. 183, 1991, New York, pp. 389–396 (in Russian).
- Chris Newman. Eugene Dubnov poems 1979–90. With German transl. by Gisela Gronemeyer & C. Newman. MusikTexte. Edition Musiktexte. 1993.
- Stand, Winter 2017/2018)Stephen Pimenoff. Review.
- Yuri Kolker. In memoriam Eugene Dubnov (1949–2019). Masterskaya 24.09.2019 (in Russian)
- Lea Grinberg-Dubnov (Ed.) "The Voice of my Life..." In memory of Eugene Dubnov. Articles about the work of E. Dubnov. Memories of friends. Prose and poetry". Aleteya Publishing House, Saint Petersburg, 2021, 570 p.(in Russian) ISBN 978-5-00165-361-5
