= Moritz Güdemann =

Austrian rabbi and historian (1835–1918)

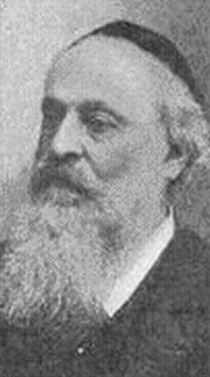
- Portrait of Moritz Güdemann
- Born: 19 February 1835; Hildesheim, German Confederation
- Died: 5 August 1918 (aged 83); Baden bei Wien, Austria-Hungary
- Occupations: Rabbi and historian

Moritz Güdemann (Hebrew: משה גידמן; 19 February 1835 – 5 August 1918) was an Austrian rabbi and historian. He served as chief rabbi of Vienna.

== Biography ==
Moritz (Moshe) Güdemann attended the Jewish school in Hildesheim, and thereafter went to a Catholic Gymnasium. He was educated at the University of Breslau (Ph.D. 1858), and took his rabbinical diploma (1862) at the newly founded Jewish Theological Seminary there. In the latter year he was called to the rabbinate of Magdeburg; in 1866 he went to Vienna as preacher, where he became rabbi in 1868, and chief rabbi in 1892.

He married his first wife, Fanny Spiegel, in 1863. After her death he married Ida Sachs, with whom he had four children.

== On Zionism ==
Güdemann protested the proposal to strike from the prayer-book all passages referring to the return of the Jews to the Holy Land (compare his sermon "Jerusalem, die Opfer und die Orgel," 1871). He threatened to resign over this issue.

Theodor Herzl tried to persuade Güdemann – as the Chief Rabbi of Viennese Jewry – to take a Zionist side and submitted his pamphlet Der Judenstaat. Versuch einer modernen Lösung der Judenfrage (1896) before the publication for his approval. Güdemann's initially positive association with Herzl's project changed after reading his manuscript, which he opposed on theological grounds. Herzl's Zionism was influenced by the state theories of Machiavelli and Hegel, the nation-state thinking of the 19th century, far more than by the religious traditions of Judaism.

Güdemann fought Herzl's project with his anti-Zionist counter-writing Nationaljudenthum (1897). Güdemann published his detailed rebuttal before the first Zionist congress in Basel in 1897, in the same publishing house that had published Herzl's pamphlet. Güdemann argued that a “National Judaism” no longer existed since the destruction of the Second Temple in Jerusalem, that Judaism was a world religion and that there was an irreconcilable contradiction between Judaism and Jewish nationality. Zionism “transfers national chauvinism... to Judaism” and “a Judaism... with cannons and bayonets would swap the role of David for that of Goliath and be a pathetic travesty of itself”, he criticized. He was not, however, opposed to apolitical Jewish immigration to the land of Israel, and he would later raise funds for Jewish settlement there.

== Published works ==
Güdemann wrote on the history of Jewish education and culture, and was associated with the Wissenschaft des Judentums movement. In addition to dozens of articles, he published the following monographs:

- "Die Geschichte der Juden in Magdeburg," 1865
- "Die Neugestaltung des Rabbinenwesens," 1866
- "Sechs Predegten," 1867
- "Jüdisches im Christenthum des Reformationszeitalters," 1870
- "Jüdisches Unterrichtswesen Während der Spanisch-Arabischen Periode," 1873
- "Religionsgeschichtliche Studien," 1876
- "Geschichte des Erziehungswesens und der Kultur der Abendländischen Juden," 3 vols., 1880–88
- "Nächstenliebe," 1890
- "Quellenschriften zur Gesch. des Unterrichts und der Erziehung bei den Deutschen Juden," 1894
- "Das Judenthum in Seinen Grundzügen und nach Seinen Geschichtlichen Grundlagen Dargestellt," 1902
- "Das Judenthum im Neutestamentlichen Zeitalter in Christlicher Darstellung," 1903.
