= Avigdor Cohen of Vienna =

Austrian rabbi (c. mid-13th century)

Rabbi Avigdor HaKohen ben Elijah of Vienna (also known as Rabbi Avigdor Cohen Tsedek or Avigdor Cohen von Wien) (fl. mid-13th century) was the earliest of the great Talmudists of Austria.

== Biography ==
Rabbi Avigdor HaKohen was the pupil of R. Simha of Speyer (who flourished about 1220), but he knew also R. Joel HaLevi of Bonn (who flourished about 1175). Avigdor lived in Vienna, and from there administered the religious affairs of the Jewish population of Austria. Of his writings, we possess only a commentary on the Pentateuch and the five Megillot, which still exist in manuscript. From various sources, we know that he also wrote Tosafot to the treatise Ketuvot. The most prominent scholars of Germany often applied to him for advice on difficult ritualistic problems, theoretical or practical, and attached great importance to his decisions. He had also distinguished pupils, among whom was the eminent Rabbi Meir of Rothenburg.
