= Moshe Avigdor Amiel =

Russian rabbi (1882–1945)

Rabbi Moshe Avigdor Amiel
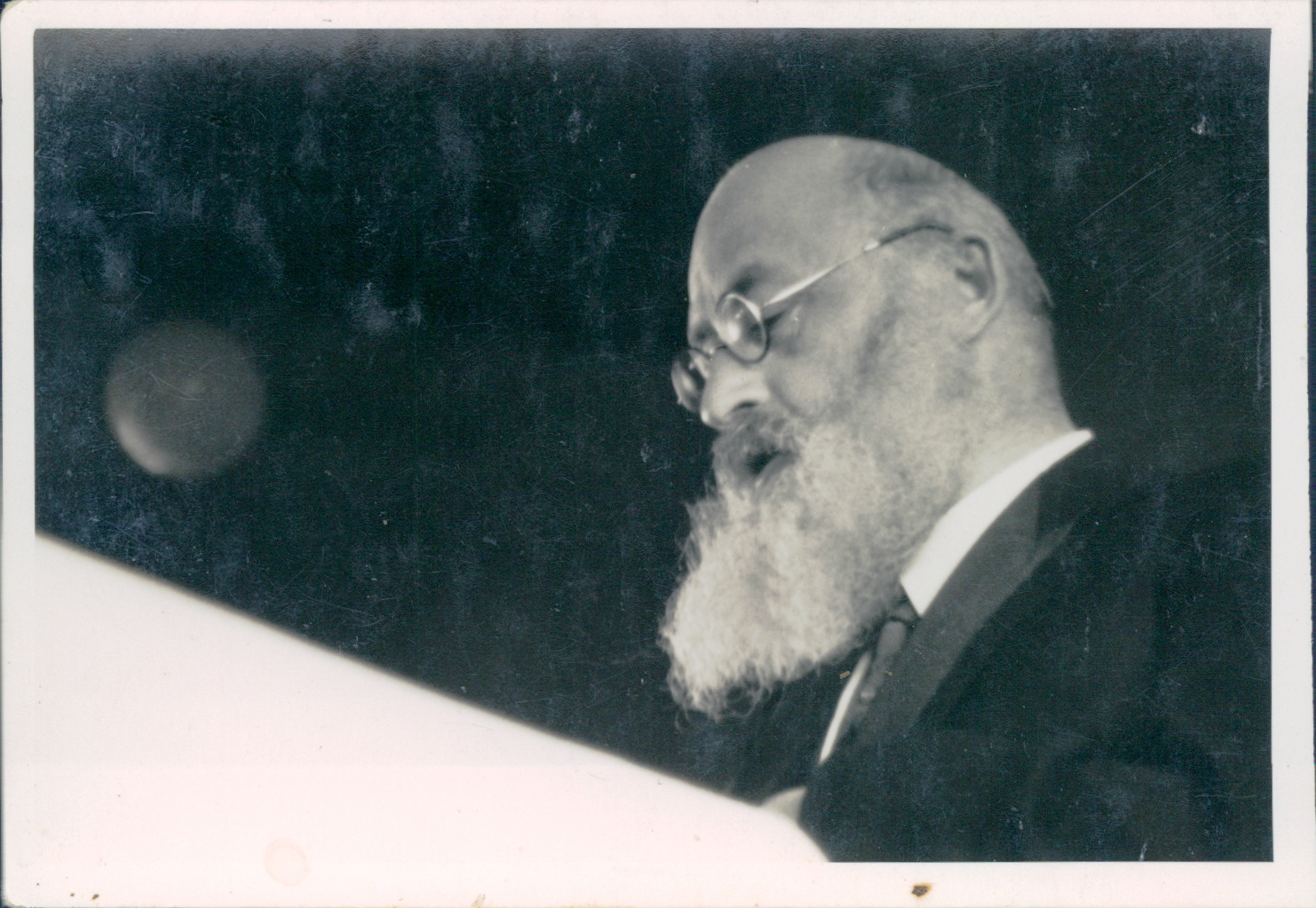
- Rabbi Amiel photographed between 1930 and 1940

Personal life
- Born: 1 April 1882 Porazava, Russian Empire (now Belarus)
- Died: 27 March 1945 (aged 62) Tel Aviv, Mandatory Palestine (now Israel)
- Spouse: Masha Amiel

Religious life
- Religion: Judaism

Jewish leader
- Predecessor: Shlomo HaKohen Aharonson
- Successor: Isser Yehuda Unterman
- Position: Head Rabbi of Tel Aviv

Moshe Avigdor Amiel (Hebrew: משה אביגדור עמיאל; 1 April 1882 – 27 March 1945) was a Russian rabbi, writer, philosopher, and one of the leaders of the World Mizrachi and Religious Zionism. He served as a rabbi in Švenčionys, Lithuania, Grajewo, Poland, and Antwerp, Belgium, and was the chief rabbi in Tel Aviv.

== Early life and education ==
Amiel was born in Porazava, Grodno Governorate, Russian Empire, the first child of Rabbi Yaakov-Yosef and Rivka. Until the age of 13, he studied in the religious schools of the city and with his father. When he was 13 he went to study at the Telshe Yeshiva with Rabbi Eliezer Gordon, Rabbi Shimon Shkop, and Rabbi Yosef Leib Bloch. Later, he went to study at the Brisk Yeshiva with Rabbi Chaim Soloveitchik, and another year later he went to study in Vilna with the Rabbi Haim Ozer Grodzonski. When Amiel was 18 he received semikhah from the rabbis Meir Simcham of Dvinsk and Joseph Rosen, becoming a rabbi.

== Career ==
After the death of Rabbi Pinchas Rozobski, Amiel became the rabbi in the city of Švenčionys, aged 23, and established a yeshiva there. After speaking at the World Mizrachi in 1920, Amiel was called to serve as a rabbi in Antwerp, a position he held from 1920 to 1936.

In 1933, Amiel visited Mandatory Palestine and met Rabbi Abraham Isaac Kook. After the death of Tel Aviv's chief rabbi Shlomo HaKohen Aharonson, Amiel was offered the position, which he accepted on 16 January 1936. Upon arriving at the railway station in Jerusalem, he was greeted by a large delegation of Orthodox Jews, some of whom had even gone ahead to Alexandria to greet him early. He founded a yeshiva in Tel Aviv that is now named after him.

== Death and legacy ==
Towards the end of his life, Amiel suffered from heart disease. He died on 27 March 1945 in Tel Aviv.

A yeshiva in Tel Aviv which he helped found, Yeshivat Harav Amiel is named after him.

== Writings ==
Rabbi Amiel wrote about a wide range of subjects, including halacha, aggadah, philosophy, and kabbalah. He was particularly influenced by the Lithuanian school of halachic thought, as well as René Descartes and Immanuel Kant. He also wrote nine volumes of ecclesiastical works.

=== Philosophy ===
In his philosophical writings, Amiel largely utilized Descartes's theory of rationalism and the concept of a priori and a posteriori popularised by Kant, while also showing how those systems of philosophy already existed within the Jewish tradition. He also used a version of Descartes's ontological argument to prove the existence of God:

The very fact that I exist and that I have the notion of a totally perfect object, this itself clearly demonstrates that God exists. However, these things are not at all new. Here is the first tenet of Judaism: "Just as He is, so are you"—namely, in the very sense of commitment involved in the "so you are merciful and gracious" implies that "just as He is in the world".

— Moshe Avigdor Amiel

==== Unitary synthesis ====
Rabbi Amiel viewed the unity of God and the unity of creation as interconnected and used the idea of synthesis to describe Judaism:

For Judaism is based on a synthesis within the world of thought and feelings. Just as nature as a whole is a synthesis of day and night, summer and winter, cold and hot...so also does human thought operate according to the principle of thesis-antithesis-synthesis... This is why the Torah is called a song... For what is singing if not the harmony formed by a variety of voices?

— Moshe Avigdor Amiel

==== Liberty ====
Rabbi Amiel introduced the idea of three types of liberty: political liberty (freedom from foreign rule), moral liberty (freedom from external influences), and economic liberty (freedom from being economically dependent on others), and connected them to the three pilgrimage festivals: Passover, Shavuot, and Sukkot respectively.

==== Democracy and capitalism ====
Rabbi Amiel was very critical of democracy and capitalism in the early twentieth century, especially what he characterized as American trampling capitalism, or "a jungle where capitalists reign supreme in the name of democracy". He viewed the Jewish system of democracy as ideal but nonexistent:

An extremely ideal democracy such as the Jewish one is nonexistent...granting to others all the rights, absolute equality of rights, while burdening ourselves with all the obligations.

— Moshe Avigdor Amiel

=== Religious Zionism ===
Rabbi Amiel was a Religious Zionist and viewed Religious Zionism as the embodiment of the concept of "Torah ve'Avoda" (Torah and work), and held that both were needed for building a state. Amir Mashiach of Ariel University writes about this:

Using Hegelian dialectics, Amiel explained his approach: the thesis (spirit) and antithesis (matter) unite to form a synthesis (complete Judaism). He argued that exile transformed Jewish identity from a multidimensional biblical identity to a one-dimensional rabbinical identity focused solely on spirituality. Religious Zionism aimed to restore Judaism to its original completeness.

— Amir Mashiach

Amiel viewed both secular Zionism and ultraorthodoxy as not useful for building a Jewish state due to the ultraorthodox exclusive focus on Torah and secular Zionism's exclusive focus on work; in fact, he compared secular nationalism to idolatry and viewed socialism as a form of oppression.

=== List ===
- Darkhei Moshe (the way of Moses) — composed between 1912 and 1928, a work on halacha.
- Hegyonot El Ami — collection of essays.
- Sermons Unto My People — Composed in 1936, a collection of sermons.
- HaMiddot LeCheker HaHalakhah (Qualities to expound the Halacha) — Composed between 1933-1939, three-volume work on Jewish legal methodology.
- LeNevukhei HaTekufah (for the confused of the period) — Amiel's last work; covers topics like belief in God, ethics, and Jewish history.
