= Dovid Barkin =

Rabbi Dovid Barkin
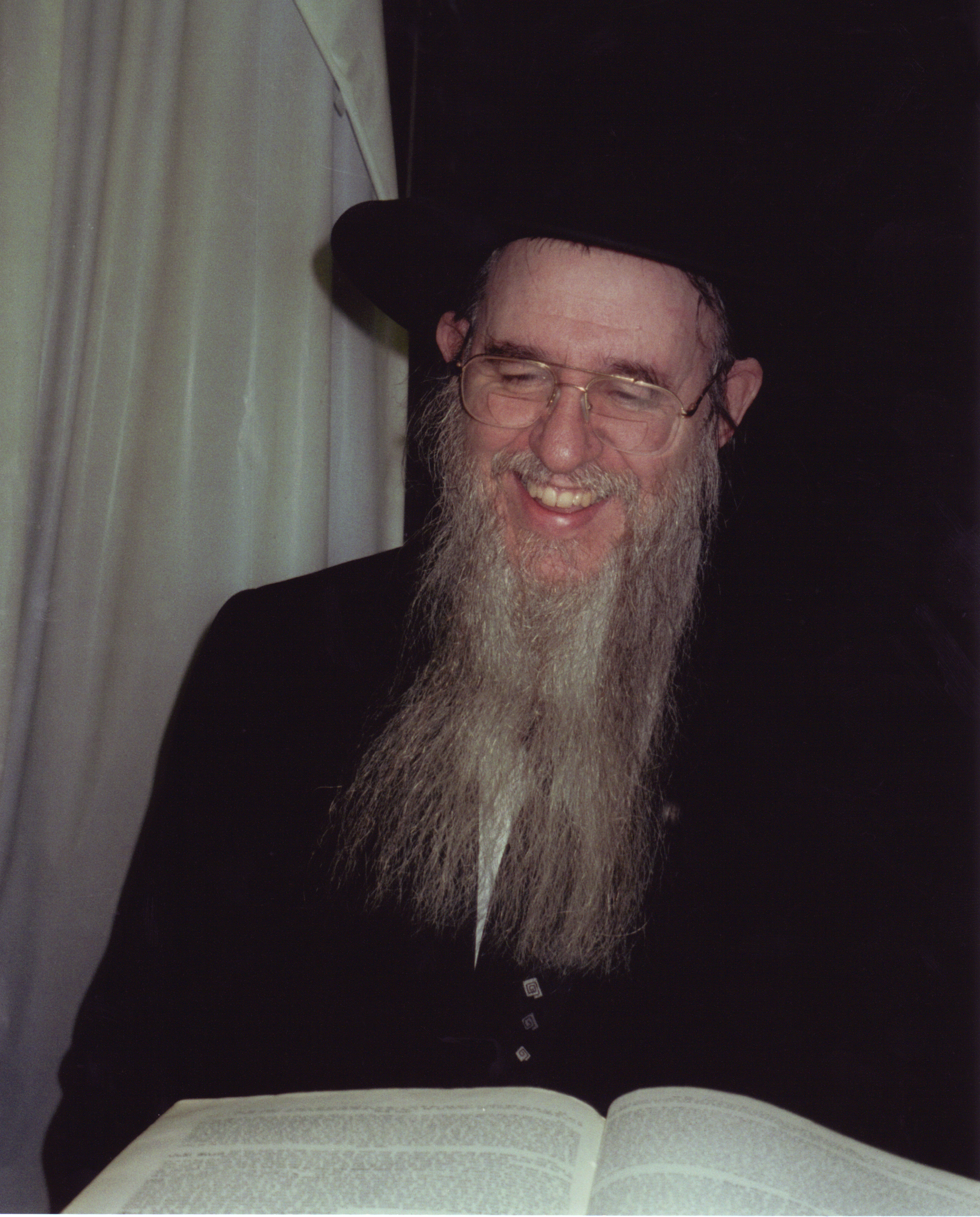
- Rabbi Dovid Barkin

Personal life
- Born: David Barkin; October 24, 1945 Chicago, Illinois, U.S.
- Died: December 20, 2005 (aged 60) Cleveland, Ohio, U.S.
- Spouse: Miriam Bloch
- Parent(s): Kalmen Barkin and Golda Barkin
- Occupation: Rosh yeshiva

Religious life
- Religion: Judaism
- Denomination: Orthodox

Jewish leader
- Predecessor: Mordechai Gifter
- Successor: Yitzchok Sorotzkin
- Position: Rosh Yeshiva
- Yeshiva: Telshe yeshiva
- Main work: Lectures on the Talmud

Dovid Barkin (born David Barkin; October 24, 1945 – December 20, 2006) was an American Rosh Yeshiva (dean) of the Telshe Yeshiva in Cleveland, Ohio.

Barkin was born in Chicago to Kalmen Barkin, a rabbi, and his wife Golda, Lithuanian Jews. He married Miriam Bloch, the daughter of Telzer Rosh Yeshiva, Eliyahu Meir Bloch.
