= Sorotzkin =

Sorotzkin is a surname. Notable people with the surname include:

- Baruch Sorotzkin (1917–1979), American Haredi rabbi
- Yitzchok Sorotzkin, American Orthodox rabbi
- Zalman Sorotzkin (1881–1966), Lithuanian Orthodox rabbi
- Sholem Ber Sorotzkin, Rosh Yeshivas Ateret Shlomo Jerusalem

Sorotzkin may also refer to:

- Unsdorf, a Jerusalem neighborhood also known as Sorotzkin, after its main street
