= Chaim Dov Keller =

American rabbi (1930–2020)

Chaim Dov Keller (1930 – August 17, 2020) was an American Haredi rabbi, Talmudic scholar, and rosh yeshiva (dean) of the Telshe Yeshiva in Chicago for six decades. He was also a member of the "Nesius" (Presidium) of the Moetzes Gedolei HaTorah of Agudath Israel of America.

== Biography ==
Chaim Dov Keller was born in New York City in 1930. He studied at Yeshiva University and subsequently attended the Telshe yeshiva in Cleveland, Ohio, under the leadership of Rabbis Chaim Mordechai Katz and Eliyahu Meir Bloch. Keller became a student and disciple of Bloch in particular.

== Telshe yeshiva in Chicago and Agudath Israel of America ==
In 1960, Rabbi Avrohom Chaim Levin and Rabbi Chaim Schmelczer were hand-picked by Katz to open a new branch of the yeshiva in Chicago. Keller came to serve as rosh yeshiva of the Chicago branch the following year. The Chicago yeshiva became the main non-Hasidic Lithuanian yeshiva in Chicago. Keller led the yeshiva for six decades, presenting tens of thousands of shiurim (Torah lectures) and mussar talks, and producing thousands of students. He also maintained a personal relationship with each student, being a source of guidance for his choice of higher yeshivas, finding a shidduch, and advice after marriage.

== Recognition by Agudath Israel ==
With the passage of time, and as a relatively significant number of alumni graduated from the Telshe yeshiva in Chicago, it added to the reputations of its founders in the world of (New York-based) Agudath Israel of America to which they belong. While Levin was elevated to a seat on the Moetzes Gedolei HaTorah of Agudath Israel of America, Keller became a member of its "Nesius" (Presidium), a lesser yet still prestigious appointment. Thus at Agudath Israel's premier event, its annual convention, Keller was frequently one of the official rabbis and rosh yeshivas designated to give official speeches or lectures, such as at the 77th Agudah convention in 1999 (symposium, "Drawing Lines, Drawing Near — Securing The Future Of American Jewry"); the 80th Agudah convention in 2002 (plenary session, "What in the World is Going On? — Searching for Meaning in the Maelstrom"); and the 83rd Agudah convention in 2005 ("Shabbat speakers"). He frequently wrote articles for the Agudah magazine The Jewish Observer as well.

== Personal life and death ==
Keller's first wife died in the 1990s; his son-in-law, Rabbi Dovid Schechter, also died in the 2000s. Keller was prone to weakness and poor health in his later years.

He became ill from COVID-19 during the COVID-19 pandemic in Illinois in March 2020. He never recovered and died on August 17, 2020.

== Bibliography ==
Keller authored Sefer Chidekel on weekly portions of the Torah.

The following is a short list of subjects and articles to which Keller has addressed his critiques:

- Criticism of Modern Orthodox Judaism
- Criticising Chabad Messianists
- Opposing female rabbis
- Attacking the existence of a gay club at Yeshiva College
- A Torah perspective attacking the decision in the Dover case on intelligent design

Keller also wrote a widely published obituary on Rabbi Boruch Sorotzkin, Telshe rosh yeshiva, in 2007.
