= Barkin (disambiguation) =

Barkin may refer to:

- Barkin, surname of Hebrew origin
- Barkin, surname of Basque origin
- Barkin Ladi, a local government area in Nigeria

== See also ==
- Barkin' Bill Smith, an American singer
