= Har HaMenuchot =

Jewish cemetery in Jerusalem

- הר המנוחות
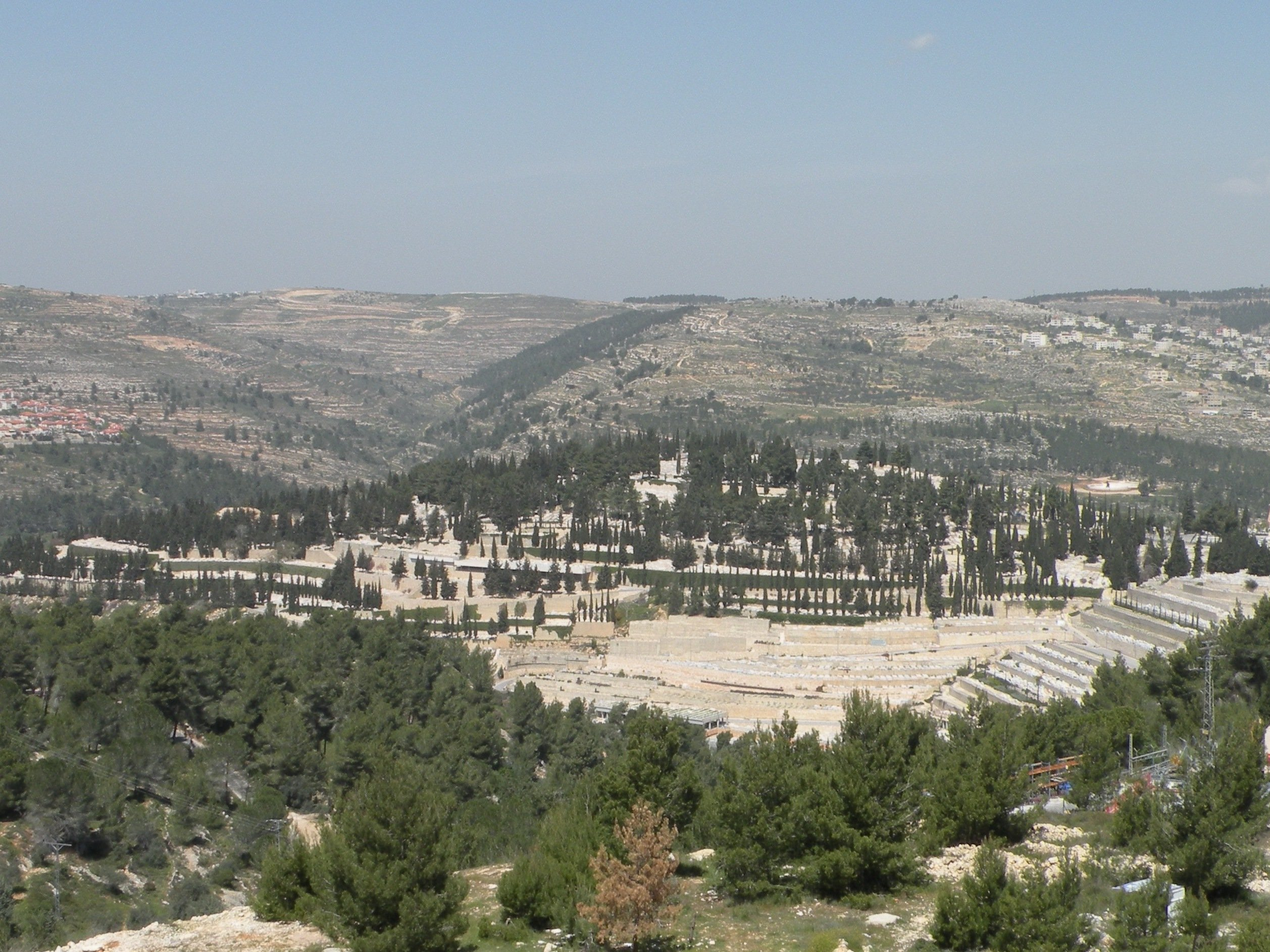

Highest point
- Elevation: 750 m (2,460 ft)
- Coordinates: 31°47′53″N 35°10′40″E

Geography
- Location: Jerusalem
- Parent range: Judean

Har HaMenuchot
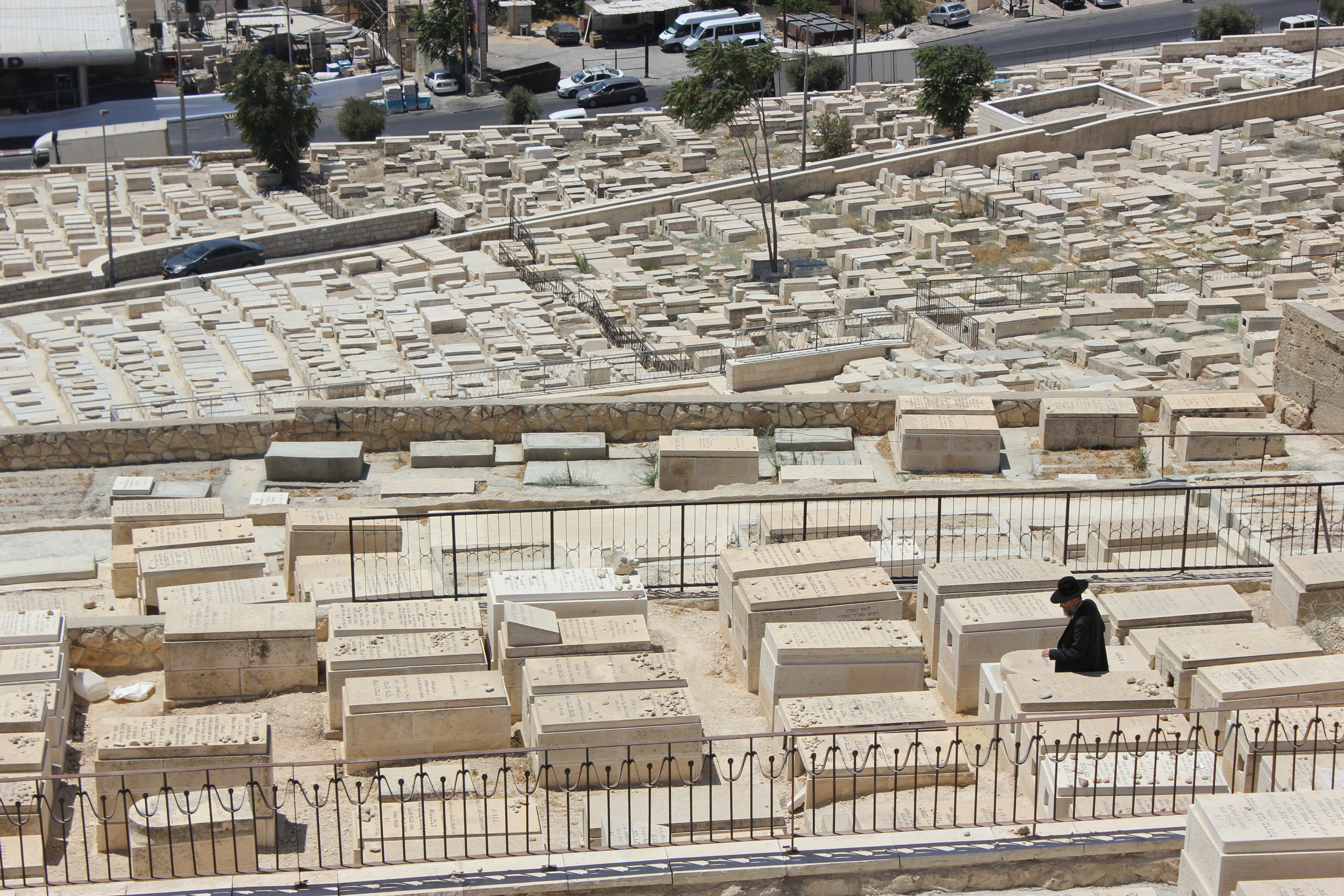
- Interactive map of Har HaMenuchot

Details
- Established: 1951
- Location: Jerusalem
- Size: 580 dunams (0.58 km^{2}; 0.22 sq mi)
- No. of graves: over 150,000

Har HaMenuchot (Hebrew: הר המנוחות, Ashkenazi pronunciation, Har HaMenuchos, lit. "Mount of Those who are Resting", also known as Givat Shaul Cemetery) is the largest cemetery in Jerusalem. The hilltop burial ground lies at the western edge of the city adjacent to the neighborhood of Givat Shaul, with commanding views of Mevaseret Zion to the north, Motza to the west, and Har Nof to the south. Opened in 1951 on 300 dunams (0.30 km^{2}; 0.12 sq mi) of land, it has continually expanded into new sections on the northern and western slopes of the hill. As of 2008, the cemetery encompasses 580 dunams (0.58 km^{2}; 0.22 sq mi) in which over 150,000 people are buried.

== History ==
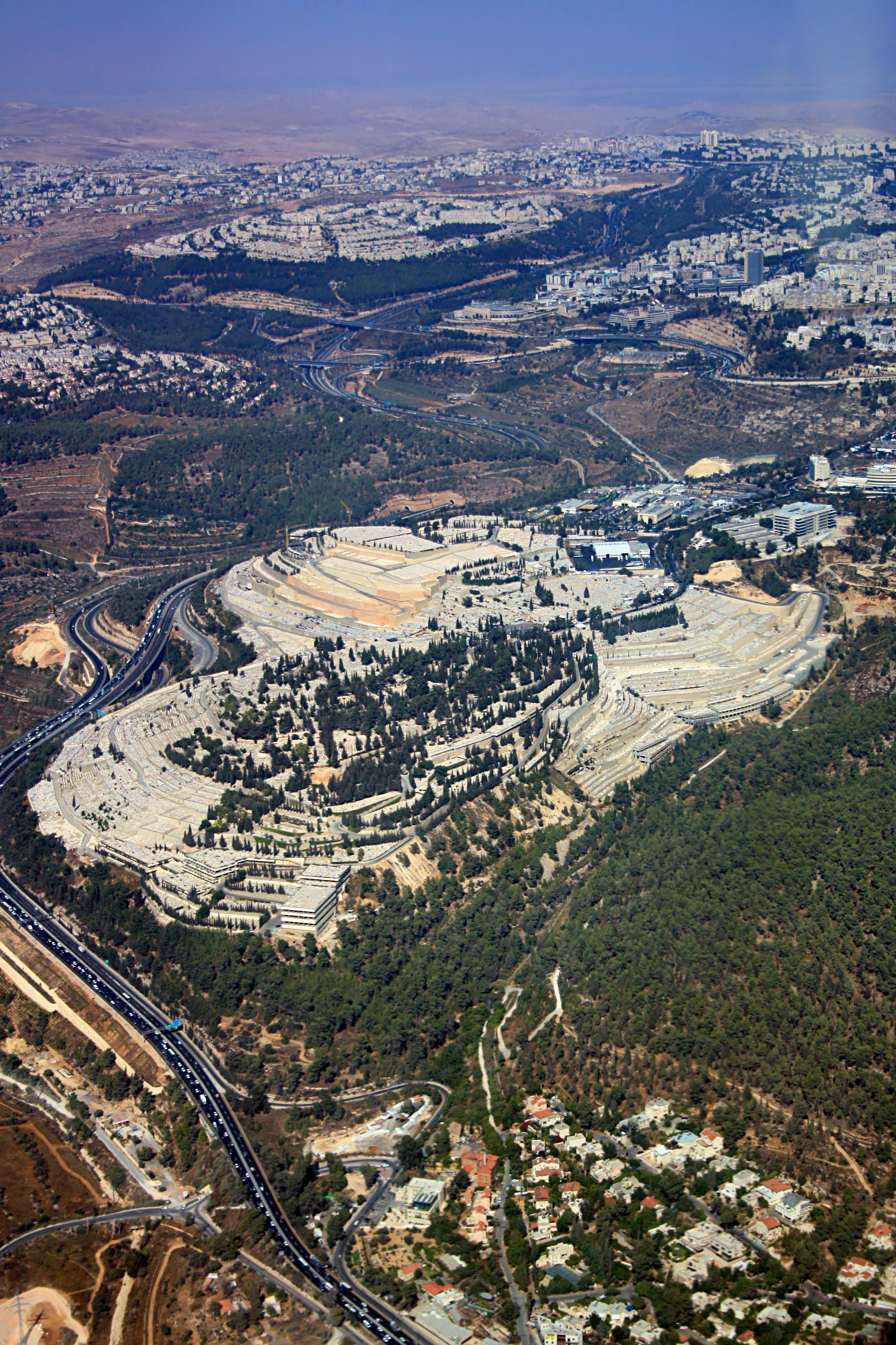
Aerial view of Har HaMenuchot

Until 1948, Jewish burials in Jerusalem were conducted in the millennia-old Jewish cemetery on the Mount of Olives. In 1948, the Arab siege of Jerusalem cut off access to the Mount of Olives, and this remained the status quo after the 1949 Armistice Agreements. In 1948 several temporary cemeteries opened to handle wartime deaths in Jerusalem, including the Sanhedria cemetery, Sheikh Badr Cemetery, and the Shaare Zedek Cemetery (on the grounds of the old Shaare Zedek Hospital on Jaffa Road). After the establishment of the state, however, these were deemed inadequate for the needs of a growing city.

In late summer 1948, developers identified a 300 dunams (0.30 km^{2}; 0.12 sq mi) hilltop located between Givat Shaul and Motza and overlooking Highway 1. It was outside the boundaries of Jerusalem at that time, yet accessible to the city, and it had soft rock for grave-digging. They calculated that each dunam would accommodate 200 graves and estimated a need for 1,000 graves per year. At the time, the city of Jerusalem had 150,000 Jewish residents with a mortality rate of 1,000 annually; at that rate, the new cemetery was expected to suffice for the next 40 years.

The developers received permission to build the cemetery a month later, but disagreements between the various burial societies delayed the first burial until the fall of 1951. With the opening of the new cemetery, civilian graves were transferred here from the temporary cemeteries at Sheikh Badr and the old Shaare Zedek Hospital.

In 1951 a new cemetery was established at Mount Herzl, dedicated by government decision as Israel's national cemetery, where national leaders and fallen soldiers would be interred.

By 1988 Har HaMenuchot had about 50,000 graves. In the 1990s developers began expanding the cemetery onto the northern and western slopes of the hill. By 2008 the cemetery spanned 580 dunams (0.58 km^{2}; 0.22 sq mi) in which more than 150,000 people are interred.

In November 2012 the Jerusalem municipality approved a plan to shield the view of the cemetery from Highway 1, the main entryway to Jerusalem, by planting cypress trees and erecting a stone wall. The plan would allow for continued expansion of the cemetery to the north and west.

On October 30, 2019, the underground cemetery in the complex was inaugurated. The complex includes 24,000 underground graves, accessible by 3 elevators. The cost of the project was about NIS 300 million.

== Operation ==
The graves on Har HaMenuchot are divided into sections operated by various chevrei kadisha (burial societies). The Kehillat Yerushalayim burial society was allotted more than 50% of the land when the cemetery opened. Other sections were apportioned to burial societies serving the Ashkenazim (also known as Perushim), Sephardim, and Hasidic communities of Jerusalem. In the late 1990s other chevrei kadisha opened, serving the Kurdish, Georgian, Yemenite, and Bukharan Jewish communities. The Kehillat Yerushalayim burial society also operates a special section reserved for those whose Jewish identity is questionable, such as non-Jewish immigrants and atheists. (Bona fide Christians and Muslims are not buried here, but rather in their own cemeteries.) Both the Kehillat Yerushalayim and the Sephardi burial societies maintain an on-site funeral parlor.

As the official municipal burial ground, Har HaMenuchot accommodates free burials for Israeli citizens and tourists who die while in Israel; the cost of the plot and funeral services is paid for by Bituah Leumi, the National Insurance Institute. However, the choice of plot is left to the burial society, and if a spouse wishes to be buried in the adjacent plot, he or she must pay for the second plot. According to the law, the burial society must reserve the plots on both sides of a newly dug grave for 90 days in order to give the spouse and relatives of the deceased the option to purchase them. According to the Kehillat Yerushalayim burial society, 90 percent of the burials at Har HaMenuchot involve couples. Stone monuments must be paid for by the family of the deceased. The burial societies recoup their development costs and make their profit on the sale of plots to Jews living abroad, with the price of the plot, burial costs, and transportation of the body by airline exceeding US$11,000. Burials from abroad constitute an estimated one-fifth to one-third of all burials.

The cemetery has a section for individuals without a religious faith. One example of a burial here was in 2018, when Ala'a Qarash was buried after a ruling by Chief Rabbi of Jerusalem Rabbi Aryeh Stern. Muslim cemeteries in the area refused to bury Qarash because he sold his property to a Jew.

== Description ==
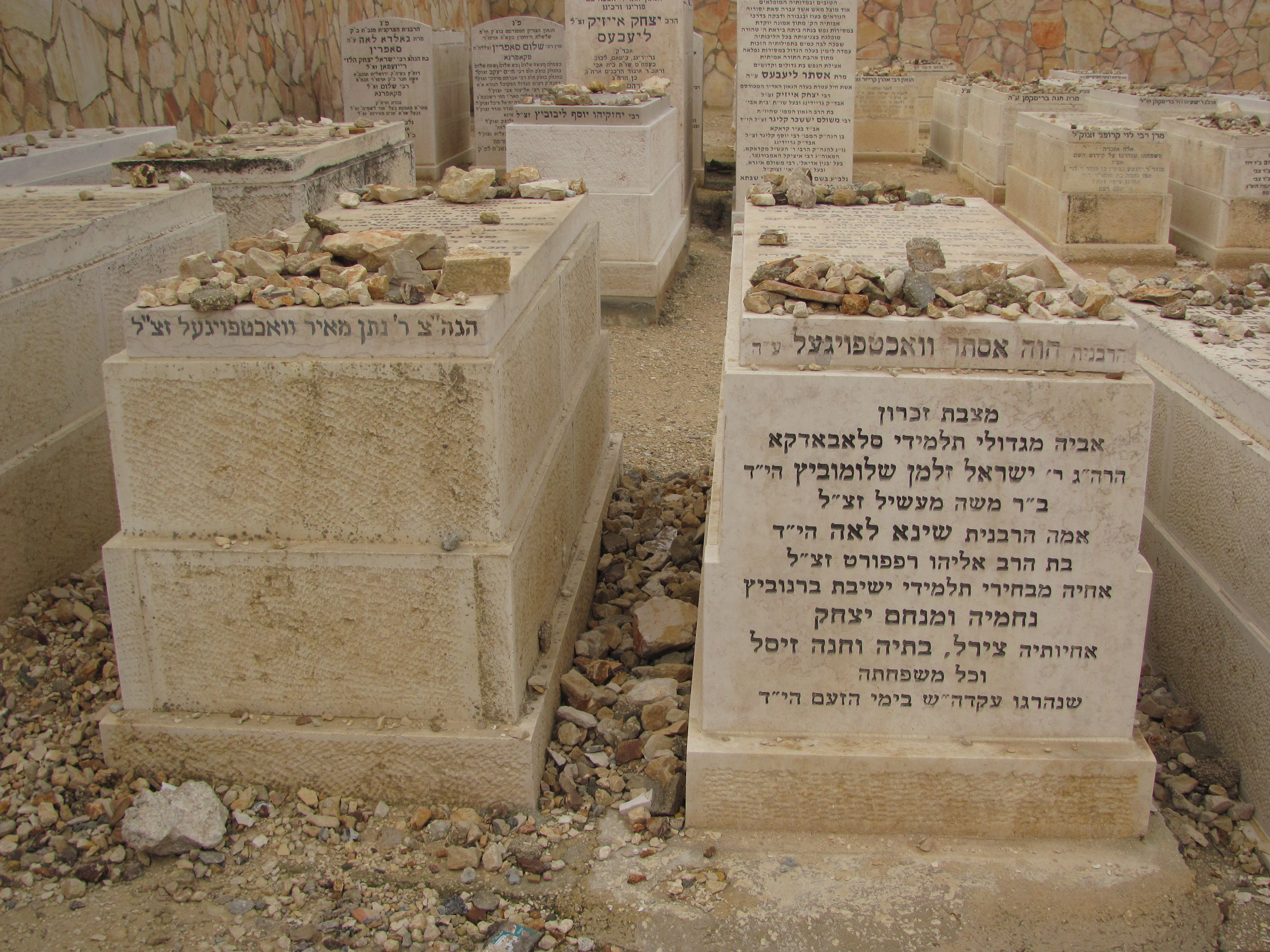
The names of family members killed in the Holocaust are engraved on the side of the grave of Chava Esther Wachtfogel (right), wife of Rabbi Nosson Meir Wachtfogel (grave at left).

Like other Jewish cemeteries in Jerusalem, the plots on Har HaMenuchot consist of an underground grave topped by a rectangular platform of poured concrete, faced with stone tiles, that rises 2 feet (0.61 m) or more above-ground. The name, date and praises of the deceased are inscribed on the top panel and occasionally on the sides. The writing is either engraved and filled in with black lead, or simply painted on. In some cases, names of family members of the deceased who were murdered in the Holocaust are engraved on the sides of the gravestone. Many graves include a small cavity hollowed out of the box, where memorial candles are placed. The graves are generally positioned less than 1 foot (0.30 m) apart.

The sections run by the Kehillat Yerushalayim and Perushim burial societies differ in appearance. The former is divided into color-coded sections that are easily reached by roadways, and has trees and bushes planted alongside the sections to provide shade for visitors on hot summer days. The Perushim section, on the other hand, abides by customs maintained in Jewish cemeteries for centuries, including the complete absence of trees or vegetation near the graves or even bordering the road.

Kohanim are interred in a separate section just outside the main entrance, so that their family members who are not allowed to enter cemeteries to avoid tumas meis (ritual impurity caused by the dead) may stand by the side of the road and pray at their ancestors' graves.

The cemetery contains a genizah (sacred texts repository) where kvitlach (prayer notes) from the Western Wall are buried.

In addition to visitor parking, the cemetery is serviced twice an hour by Egged bus number 54, which has its terminus at the Har Hotzvim terminal passes the Jerusalem Central Bus Station and Rav-Shefa Mall, and Kanfei Nesharim Street.

== Points of interest ==
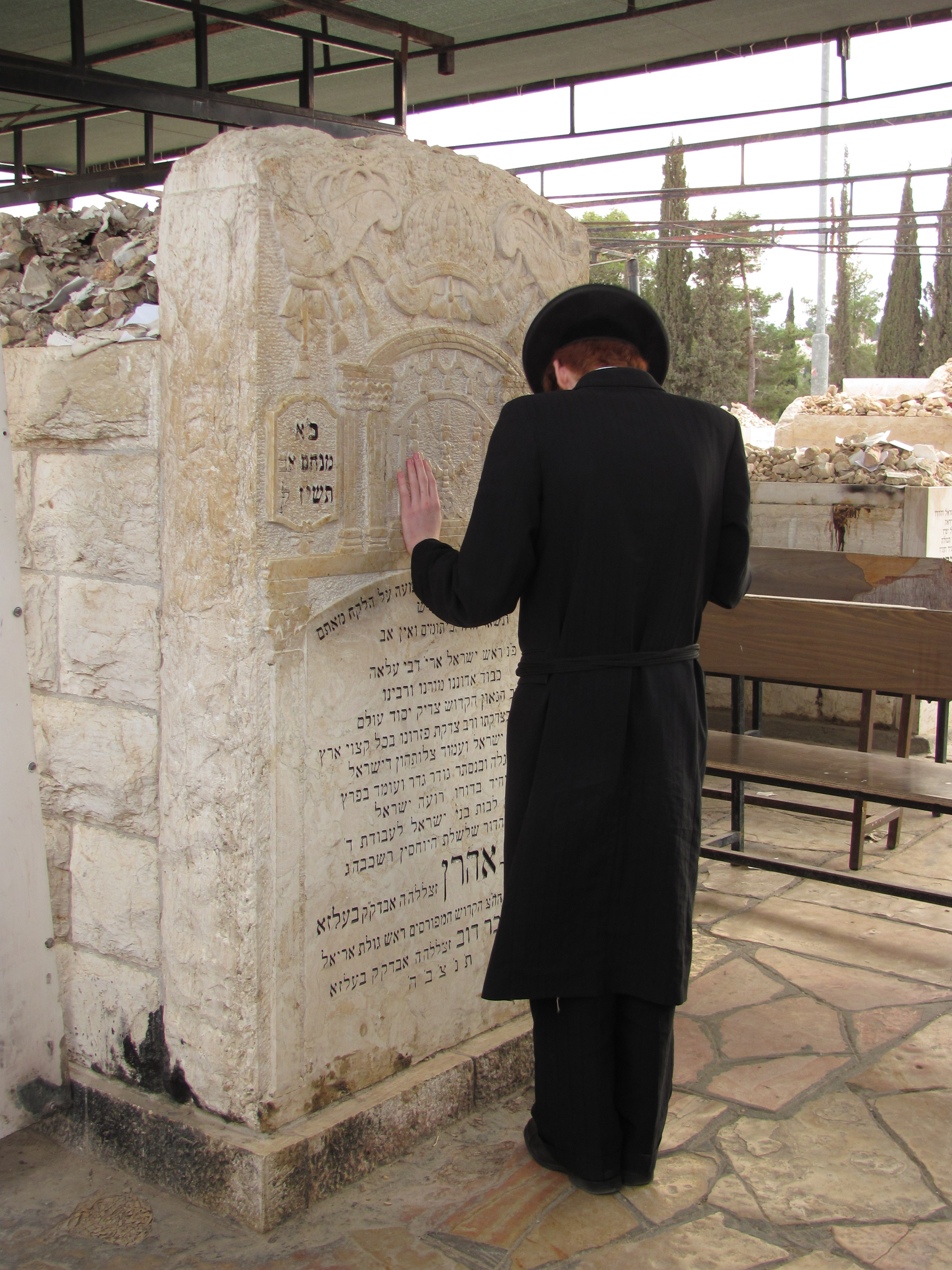
A man prays at the tomb of Aharon Rokeach, the fourth Belzer rebbe.

Near the main entrance lies the original Chelkat Harabbonim (Hebrew: חלקת הרבנים, "Rabbis' Section") operated by the Ashkenazi (Perushim) burial society, which includes the graves of many gedolim of the past 60 years from around the world. The largest grave in this section is that of Rabbi Aharon Rokeach, the fourth Belzer Rebbe, which has become a shrine for thousands of visitors annually. An area of dalet amos (four cubits) surrounds this grave. An iron parapet constructed nearby allows Kohanim to pray near the rabbinical graves without exposing themselves to tumah (ritual impurity). Another Chelkas Harabbonim is located on the north slope of the hill; this is the resting place for Rabbis Shlomo Wolbe, Nosson Meir Wachtfogel, and Yosef Shalom Elyashiv, among others.

A grave known as a segula (propitious remedy) for childless women is that of Miriam ha-Koveset (Hebrew: מרים הכובסת, Miriam the Laundress), who only worked in the homes of Torah scholars, including Rabbi Yosef Shalom Elyashiv and the Zvhiller Rebbe, Rabbi Shlomo "Shlomke" Goldman. Once Miriam asked the Zvhiller Rebbe for a blessing for children, but he blessed her that in her merit, others would merit to have children. Twenty-nine years after her death in 1964, one of her neighbors had a dream in which Miriam appeared to her, told her of the Zvhiller Rebbe's promise, and gave her directions to her grave. On her yahrzeit that year, busloads of women came to pray at the grave while a Torah scholar recited prayers for the elevation of her soul. There were 32 known cases of women who prayed at Miriam's grave and gave birth to children that year. Since then, her grave, located near the main parking lot, has been renovated and enlarged to accommodate women year-round.

The burial place of Rabbi Aryeh Leib Malin on Har HaMenuchot

== Notable rabbis buried at Har HaMenuchot ==
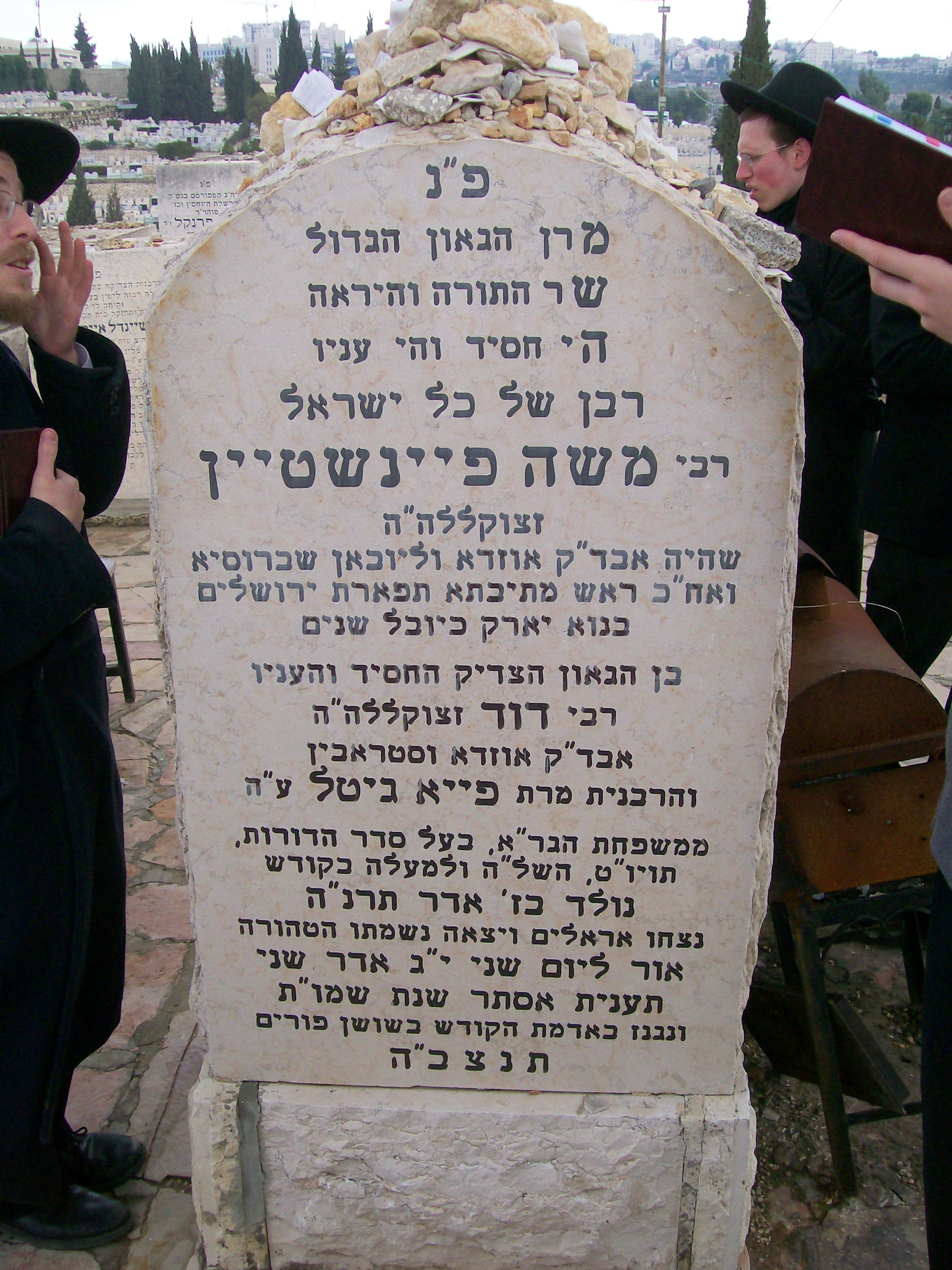
Grave of Rabbi Moshe Feinstein.

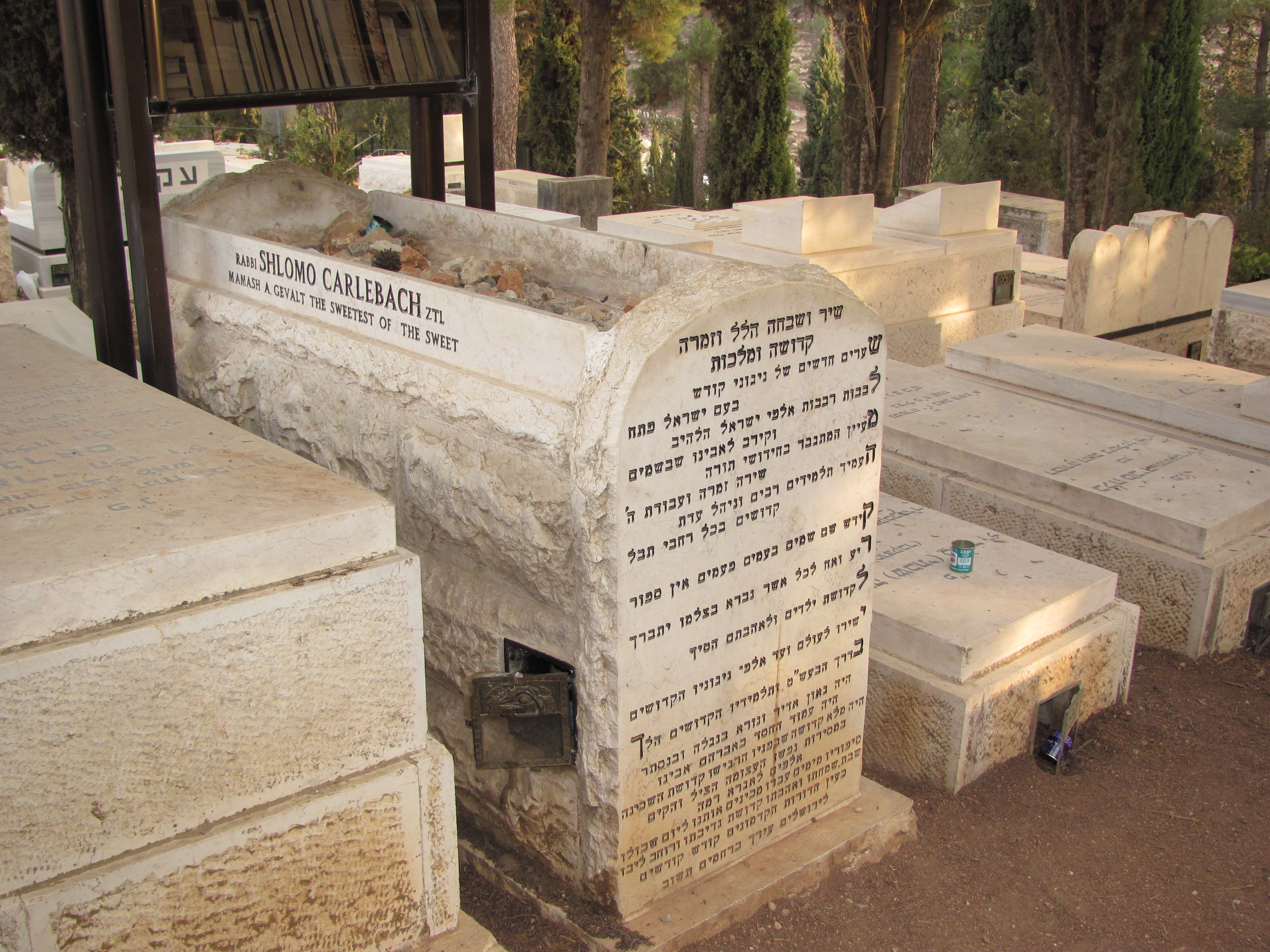
Grave of Rabbi Shlomo Carlebach, with Hebrew and English inscriptions.

- Yehezkel Abramsky, Av Beit Din of London
- Yaakov Ades, Sephardic gadol and member of the Jerusalem beth din
- Yehuda Amital, founder of Yeshivat Har Etzion, Meimad movement
- Baruch Ashlag, kabbalist
- Yehuda Ashlag, the Baal HaSulam
- Ezra Attiya, rosh yeshiva of Porat Yosef Yeshiva, Jerusalem
- Chaim Yehuda Leib Auerbach, rosh yeshiva of Shaar Hashamayim Yeshiva
- Shlomo Zalman Auerbach, Jerusalem posek
- Baruch Ben Haim, assistant chief rabbi of the Syrian Jewish community in Brooklyn, New York
- Zelig Reuven Bengis, rosh av beit din of Jerusalem
- Amram Blau, one of the founders of Neturei Karta
- Abraham Yochanan Blumenthal, founder of Zion Blumenthal Orphanage
- Nachman Bulman, rabbi in the United States and Israel
- Shlomo Carlebach, rabbi-songwriter
- Reb Chaim Daskal, Reb Chaim of Yerushalayim
- Akiva Ehrenfeld, Jerusalem rabbi
- Shmuel Ehrenfeld, the Mattersdorfer Rav
- Mordechai Eliyahu, former Sephardi chief rabbi of Israel
- Yosef Shalom Elyashiv, Lithuanian Orthodox gadol and posek
- Pesach Eliyahu Falk, Gateshead, Posek Hador
- Moshe Feinstein, American gadol and posek
- Binyomin Beinush Finkel, rosh yeshiva of Yeshivas Mir, Jerusalem
- Eliezer Yehuda Finkel, rosh yeshiva of Yeshivas Mir, Belarus and Jerusalem
- Eliyahu Boruch Finkel, rosh yeshiva of Yeshivas Mir, Jerusalem
- Nosson Tzvi Finkel, rosh yeshiva of Yeshivas Mir, Jerusalem
- Tzvi Pesach Frank, chief rabbi of Jerusalem
- Yozef Friedlander, Lisker Rebbe
- Moshe Hauer, Executive Vice President of the Orthodox Union
- Yaakov Yosef Herman, Orthodox Jewish pioneer in the United States in the early 20th century.
- Yitzhak Kaduri, Sephardi kabbalist
- Meir Kahane, Kach party founder
- Jacob S. Kassin, chief rabbi of the Syrian Jewish community in Brooklyn, New York
- Chaim Mordechai Katz, rosh yeshiva of Telz-Cleveland
- Aharon Kotler, founder and rosh yeshiva of Beth Medrash Govoha, Lakewood, New Jersey
- Shneur Kotler, rosh yeshiva of Beth Medrash Govoha
- Chaim Kreiswirth, av beit din of Antwerp
- Zundel Kroizer, Haredi Israeli rabbi and author of Ohr Hachamah
- Aaron Aryeh Leifer, Nadvorna Rebbe
- Avraham Abba Leifer, Pittsburger Rebbe
- Zion Levy, chief rabbi of Panama
- Aharon Lichtenstein, rosh yeshiva of Yeshivat Har Etzion in Alon Shvut
- Gershon Liebman, rosh yeshiva of the Novardok Yeshiva network in France
- Aryeh Leib Malin, rosh yeshiva of Beth Hatalmud Rabbinical College
- Isser Zalman Meltzer, rosh yeshiva of Slutsk and Etz Chaim, Jerusalem
- Yisroel Ber Odesser, Breslov rabbi
- Chanoch Dov Padwa, av beit din of London
- Menachem Porush, legislator, educator, journalist
- Yosef Qafih, Yemenite rabbi and community leader
- Louis Isaac Rabinowitz, chief rabbi of South Africa and deputy mayor of Jerusalem
- Bezalel Rakow, Gateshead Rav
- Aharon Rokeach, Belzer Rebbe
- Tibor Rosenbaum, Hungarian-born Swiss rabbi and businessman
- Shulem Safrin, Komarno Rebbe
- Nota Schiller, rosh yeshiva of Ohr Somayach
- Chaim Shmuelevitz, rosh yeshiva of Yeshivas Mir, Jerusalem
- Yochanan Sofer, leader of the Erlau (Eger) dynasty.
- Meshulam Dovid Soloveitchik, rosh yeshiva of Brisk
- Yitzchok Zev Soloveitchik, Brisker Rav
- Baruch Sorotzkin, rosh yeshivas Telz-Cleveland
- Zalman Sorotzkin, av beit din of Lutsk
- Nosson Meir Wachtfogel, mashgiach ruchani, Beth Medrash Govoha
- Eliezer Waldenberg, medical halakhist and member of the Jerusalem beit din
- Chaim Walkin, rabbi and lecturer
- Simcha Wasserman, Jerusalem rabbi
- Dov Berish Weidenfeld, av beit din of Tchebin (Trzebinia)
- Noah Weinberg, founder and rosh yeshiva of Aish HaTorah
- Yechiel Yaakov Weinberg, Orthodox rabbi, posek ("decisor" of Jewish law) and rosh yeshiva
- Shlomo Wolbe, mashgiach, Be'er Yaakov yeshiva
- Avraham Yoffen, rosh yeshiva of Beis Yosef Novardok
- Mordechai Leib Kaminetzky, Jerusalem rabbi
- Yitzhak Kaduri, Mekubal / kabbalist
- Mordechai Sharabi, Mekubal / kabbalist and rosh yeshiva of Yeshivat Nahar Shalom
- Shimon Abecassis, member of Beit Din of Mogador, Morrocco, author of sefarim

== Notable rabbis reinterred at Har HaMenuchot ==
- Chaim Joseph David Azulai, the Chida
- Yosef Yozel Horwitz, the Alter of Novardok
- Meir Shapiro, Rav of Lublin
- Menachem Ziemba, Rav of Warsaw

== Zionist personalities buried at Har HaMenuchot ==
- Rachel Yanait Ben-Zvi
- Yitzhak Ben-Zvi
- Naftali Herz Imber
- Mordechai Zar

== Other notable people buried at Har Hamenuchot ==
- Tuvia Bielski, leader of the Bielski partisans
- Dora Bloch, killed by Idi Amin after Operation Entebbe
- Udi, Ruth, Yoav, Elad, and Hadas Fogel, victims of the 2011 Itamar attack
- Yossef Kurt Gutfreund, one of the eleven victims of the Munich massacre 1972
- Yaakov Yosef Herman, American Orthodox pioneer
- Menachem Elon, former Deputy Chief Israeli Supreme Court
- Barno Itzhakova, Bukharian Jewish singer
- George Mantello, Hungarian Orthodox Jew. As First Secretary of El Salvador in Switzerland, he saved large number of Jews during the Holocaust by providing them with protection papers. He also publicized the Auschwitz Protocols.
- Miriam Monsonego, victim of the 2012 Toulouse and Montauban shootings
- Itzhak Nener, jurist and Vice President of Liberal International
- Paul Reichmann, Canadian businessman and member of the Reichmann family
- Yonatan, Arieh, and Gabriel Sandler, victims of the 2012 Toulouse and Montauban shootings
- Yona Bogale, first leader of the Ethiopian Jewish community in Israel
- The 7 Sassoon children killed in a Shabbat fire in Brooklyn NY
- Jacques Lipchitz, modernist sculptor
- Mordechai Omer, director of Tel Aviv Art Museum
- Peretz Smolenskin, writer of the Haskalah movement
- Lily Ebert, Hungarian-born Holocaust survivor, author and social media star.

== See also ==
- Bereavement in Judaism
