= Chaim Rabinowitz =

Orthodox Lithuanian rabbi and rosh yeshiva

Chaim Shalom Tuvia Rabinowitz, also known as Reb Chaim Telzer, (1856 – 21 October 1931) was an Orthodox Lithuanian rabbi and rosh yeshiva of the Telshe yeshiva. He developed a unique method of Talmudic analysis which became renowned throughout the yeshiva world as the Telzer Derech.

== Biography ==
He was born in the town of Luokė, Lithuania, and studied under rabbis Meir Simcha of Dvinsk, Yisroel Salanter, and Yitzchak Elchanan Spektor. He married Osnat Geffen (1880–1942) with whom he had two sons, Yosef and Azriel.

Following the death of Spektor in 1896, his son, Rabbi Zvi Hirsch Spektor, renamed the yeshiva in Kovno that his father had founded Knesses Beis Yitzchok and chose Rabinowitz as the first rosh yeshiva. After this, Rabinowitz served as rabbi to the town of Meishad, Lithuania.

== Telshe ==
Rabinowitz next moved to the Telshe yeshiva as a rosh mesivta under Rabbi Eliezer Gordon. In 1904 Rabbi Shimon Shkop, who had replaced Gordon as rosh yeshiva, left the Telshe yeshiva and Rabinowitz replaced him as rosh yeshiva. Rabinowitz taught in the Telshe yeshiva for twenty-six years. He was known for his shiurim (lectures) in Halakha (Jewish law) and his chakira (intensive investigation) into each subject he taught. In each chakira, he would present to his students the two opposing viewpoints and teach them how to dissect each argument point-by-point, developing their acuity and analytical skills.

Among his students was Rabbi Shimon Schwab.

== Death and legacy ==
Rabinowitz died on 21 October 1931 (10 Cheshvan 5692) and was buried in the Kovno Jewish cemetery. His son, Rabbi Azriel Rabinowitz (1905–1941), assumed his father's position as rosh yeshiva of the Telshe yeshiva.

Rabinowitz has no surviving descendants, as his wife, sons and their families were all murdered by the Nazis in Telshe in 1941 and 1942 in the Holocaust.

Rabinowitz's Talmudic lectures were recorded by a special yeshiva editorial committee and made available to students. The unpublished shiurim of Rabinowitz and Rabbi Yosef Leib Bloch are now in the Telshe yeshiva of Cleveland.

Three volumes of Rabinowitz's Talmudic lectures have been published by the Telshe yeshiva in Cleveland, under the title Chiddushei Rabbi Chaim MiTelz.
