= Names, Not Numbers =

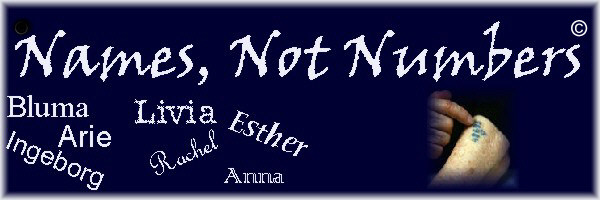

Names, Not Numbers is a Holocaust documentary film program offered to schools, universities and museums around the US, Canada and Israel. The films follow students as they learn the main aspect of filmmaking from journalists and filmmakers including research, interviewing techniques, filming techniques and editing, to prepare them to interview and film survivors and liberators themselves. They also undergo the rigorous process of editing their survivors’ 1.5 hour interview down to 15 minutes, which is added to the DVD as the extended version of their survivors interview. The interviews are further cut down and intertwined with the other survivors who were interviewed for the same school that given year, and the feature-length films are screened at the end of the school year for the students, their families, the participants, and the community.

Each film is archived at the National Library of Israel in Jerusalem, Yeshiva University's Special Collections Library, and Yad Vashem, the official memorial for the victims of the holocaust in Israel.

Currently there are 62 schools participating in the Names Not Numbers program, including Kellman Brown Academy, The Mesivta High School of Greater Philadelphia, YUHSB, YUHSG, the Moriah School, Hillel Torah, SAR Academy and Kushner, amongst other Jewish schools.

Names Not Numbers was founded by Tova Fish-Rosenberg in 2004. It has since become a nonprofit organization. Academy Award-winning producer Michael Berenbaum is among the Board of Directors in the organization.
