= Eliyahu Meir Bloch =

Orthodox Jewish rabbi

Rabbi Eliyahu Meir Bloch

Personal life
- Born: 1894 Telšiai, Russian Empire present-day Lithuania
- Died: January 22, 1955 (aged 60–61) Cleveland, Ohio, US
- Buried: Mount Olive Cemetery, Solon, Ohio
- Spouse: Rivka Bloch née Kaplan
- Parents: Rabbi Yosef Leib Bloch (father); Chasya Bloch née Gordon (mother)

Religious life
- Religion: Judaism
- Denomination: Orthodox Judaism

Jewish leader
- Predecessor: Rabbi Avraham Yitzchak Bloch
- Successor: Rabbi Chaim Mordechai Katz
- Yeshiva: Telshe Yeshiva
- Position: Rosh yeshiva
- Residence: Cleveland, Ohio

Eliyahu Meir Bloch (October 23, 1894 – January 22, 1955), often referred to as Rav Elya Meir Bloch, was a leading Orthodox Jewish rabbi in the United States in the years after World War II. He founded the Telshe Yeshiva in Cleveland, Ohio together with Rabbi Chaim Mordechai Katz, and served as its first rosh yeshiva.

== Early years ==
Rabbi Bloch was born in 1894 on Simchas Torah in Telšiai (Telshe), Lithuania, then part of the Russian Empire, to Rabbi Yosef Leib and Chasya Bloch. His mother was the daughter of Rabbi Eliezer Gordon and his father therefore served as a maggid shiur in Rabbi Gordon's yeshiva, the Telshe Yeshiva in Telšiai. His father later took the positions of rabbi in Varniai and Shadova. He returned to Telšiai in 1910 when Rabbi Gordon died and succeeded him as the community's rabbi and rosh yeshiva.

== Rabbinic career ==
He married Rivka Kaplan, the daughter of the influential Klaipėda (Memel) merchant, Avraham Moshe Kaplan, and therefore moved to Klaipėda where he lived for eight years, studying Torah and delivering shiurim (Torah classes). In 1929, he returned to Telšiai and was appointed as one of the heads of the yeshiva. During this time, he was involved in the World Agudath Israel.

=== The Holocaust ===
In 1940, the Soviets occupied Lithuania and evicted the Telshe Yeshiva from their building, converting it into a military hospital. The fact they were forbidden from teaching religion under the anti-religious Soviet laws, combined with Nazi Germany's intention of conquering Europe and murdering its Jews, led to a decision to move the yeshiva to the United States in 1941. Bloch and Chaim Mordechai Katz were sent to the US to arrange for the yeshiva's emigration. While they were in America the Nazi occupation of Lithuania took place and, out of touch with their families and the yeshiva, they decided to reopen the yeshiva from scratch in the United States. Their families remained in Europe and were murdered by the Nazis.

=== Telshe Yeshiva in the United States ===
Unlike most of the American yeshivas at the time which were established in New York, Rabbi Bloch opened the yeshiva in Cleveland, Ohio, to strengthen its Orthodox Jewish community. The primary Jewish influence in the city was that of the secular Jews, and the establishment of the yeshiva boosted the morale of the city's smaller Orthodox Jewish community.

A large part of the student body of the yeshiva was made of boys born and bred in the United States. Despite having lived their lives in Eastern Europe, Rabbis Bloch and Katz were well attuned to the American way of thinking, and understood the students' feelings. However, the yeshiva was run like the Eastern European yeshivas from before the Holocaust, with strict discipline used in regards to its rigorous schedule. Chaim Dov Keller, who studied in the yeshiva in its early years, recalled Bloch's three-hour mussar shmuess (character-improvement talk) given when the students skipped a Saturday night learning session. Keller said "Rav Elya Meir gave the shmuess.... He told us that they had no intention of opening a yeshiva to cater to the whims of American society....He spoke of the Roshei Yeshiva they had left behind in Europe [who were murdered by the Nazis], whose emissaries they were. They would never agree to such a yeshiva." Bloch then threatened to close the yeshiva if the students did not cooperate.

Bloch's influence on the Cleveland Jewish community included working on the founding of Hebrew Academy of Cleveland, the Yavneh Seminary, and a kollel.

== Death ==
Bloch died on January 22, 1955, and was buried at Mount Olive Cemetery in Solon, Ohio.

He was succeeded as rosh yeshiva by Chaim Mordechai Katz.
