= Yeshiva Birchas Chaim =

Yeshiva in Ocean County, New Jersey, United States

Location
- 1111 Vine Street; Lakewood Township, Ocean County, New Jersey 08701; United States
- 40.1084°N 74.2315°W

Information
- Type: Private High School, all-male Yeshiva
- Established: 2001
- NCES School ID: A0302157
- Faculty: 9.0 FTEs
- Grades: 9–12
- Enrollment: 145.0 (as of 2023–24)
- Student to teacher ratio: 16.1:1
- Affiliation: Orthodox Judaism

Yeshiva Birchas Chaim is a Haredi Mesivta high school in Lakewood Township, New Jersey.

It was founded by Rabbi Shmuel Zalmen Stein in 2001, after his father, Rabbi Chaim Stein, asked him to open a branch of Telshe Yeshiva in Lakewood.

As of the 2023–24 school year, the school had an enrollment of 145 students and 9 classroom teachers (on an FTE basis), for a student–teacher ratio of 16.1:1. The school's student body was 100% (145) White.

== Curriculum ==
The curriculum focuses primarily on Talmudic texts and commentary. It also includes mussar Chumash, and Halachah.
