= Chaim Mordechai Katz =

Head of Telshe Yeshiva in Cleveland

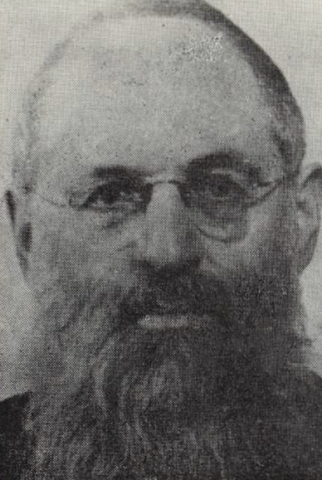

Personal life
- Born: April 9, 1894 Šeduva, Lithuania
- Died: November 17, 1964 (aged 70) Cleveland, Ohio
- Spouse: Perel Leah Bloch; Chaya Kravitz; Esther Mindle Mandel
- Children: Yaakov Zev (Velvel) Katz; Rachel Tress; Avneir Katz

Religious life
- Religion: Judaism
- Denomination: Haredi Orthodox Judaism

Jewish leader
- Predecessor: Eliyahu Meir Bloch
- Successor: Baruch Sorotzkin &Mordechai Gifter
- Yeshiva: Telz Yeshiva
- Position: Rosh Yeshiva
- Began: 1954
- Ended: November 17, 1964

Chaim Mordechai Katz (Hebrew: חיים מרדכי כץ; Lithuanian: Chaimas Mordechajus Kacas; April 9, 1894 – November 17, 1964) was an Orthodox rabbi and the Rosh Yeshiva of the Telshe Yeshiva in Cleveland.

== Prewar years ==
Katz was born in 1894 in Shadova, Russian Empire. As a young man, he studied in the yeshiva in Shadova, under the tutelage of the town's rabbi and Rosh Yeshiva, Rabbi Yosef Leib Bloch. In 1910, he went to study in the Knesses Beis Yitzchak yeshiva in Slobodka for a year, following which, in 1911, he returned to study under Bloch, who had been appointed as Chief Rabbi and Rosh Yeshiva in Telz.

In 1914, Katz went to the Volozhin Yeshiva for two years where he was ordained by Rabbi Refael Shapiro, the son-in-law of the Netziv. In 1916 he studied under Rabbi Shlomo Polachek, the renowned "Maitziter Illuy". In 1918 he returned to Telz, where he married Perel Leah, Bloch's daughter.

In 1920, Katz assisted his father in law in the founding of a preparatory school for young men (Mechina), which would prepare younger students for study in the yeshiva proper. Katz was appointed director of the Mechina. In 1922, a postgraduate institute (Kollel) was founded in Telz and he was appointed Head of the institute.

In 1930, Katz's father, wife, third oldest child (Shmuel, aged six) and father in law died. The following year he married Chaya Kravitz, Bloch's niece.

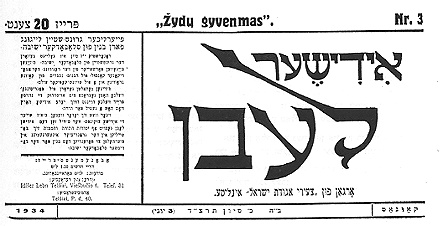
Front Page Head of Dos Yiddishe Lebben

In 1934, Katz was one of the founders of the Zeirei Agudath Israel in Lithuania and he served as the head of the Board of Action (Va'ad Hapoel). Together with his brother in law, Rabbi Eliyahu Meir Bloch, he also served as one of the editors of the Agudah newspaper in Lithuania: "Dos Yiddishe Lebben".

He participated in the first Knessiah Gedolah of the Agudath Israel in 1923 and at the third Knessiah Gedolah in 1937 he was appointed a member of the International Action Committee (Va'ad Hapoel Ha'olami).

== World War II and relocation to the USA ==
In 1940, Katz and Eliyahu Meir Bloch managed to travel out of Soviet occupied Lithuania and make their way to the United States, in the hope of re-establishing the Rabbinical College of Telshe and bringing over its faculty and student body. Both Katz and Bloch were unable to bring their wives and children, the fate of whom remained unknown to them until 1944.

In October 1942 Katz and Bloch re-established the Telz Yeshiva in Cleveland, Ohio. Together, in 1943 they established a Jewish day school: The Hebrew Academy of Cleveland.

Towards the end of the war Katz discovered that his wife and 10 children had been killed by Nazi forces in Telz in 1941. Bloch's family suffered a similar fate.

In 1946 Katz married Esther Mindle Mandel. In 1947 Katz and Bloch established a Hebrew School for girls in Cleveland called Yavneh, under the framework of the Hebrew Academy of Cleveland.

== Telz Cleveland ==
In 1954 Bloch died and Katz became head of the yeshiva (Rosh Yeshiva).

Katz served as a member on the Moetzes Gedolei HaTorah of the Agudath Israel. In 1957 the yeshiva moved from downtown Cleveland to its present-day location in Wickliffe, Ohio, on the outskirts of Cleveland.

In 1960 he established Telshe Chicago, a branch of the yeshiva in Chicago, Illinois.

On Tuesday morning, January 1, 1963, a fire broke out in one of the three dormitories at the yeshiva. Two students died in the fire and local authorities closed the remaining two dormitories as a safety measure.

On November 17, 1964 Katz died of a heart attack. He was buried on Har HaMenuchot.

His son Rabbi Yaakov Zev Katz founded and leads the Cedar-Green Community Kollel in Beachwood Ohio, officially named Kollel Yad Chaim Mordechai after his father.
