= Nachum Zev Dessler =

Lithuania-born Orthodox Jewish Rabbi

Rabbi Nachum Zev Dessler

Personal life
- Born: 1921 Kelm, Lithuania
- Died: January 23, 2011 (aged 89–90) Cleveland, Ohio
- Buried: Jerusalem, Israel
- Spouse: Miriam
- Children: Reuven, Eli, Simcha, Sarika, Malki, Peshy
- Parent(s): Eliyahu Eliezer and Bluma Dessler

Religious life
- Religion: Judaism
- Denomination: Orthodox
- Position: Dean
- Organisation: Hebrew Academy of Cleveland
- Began: 1943
- Residence: Cleveland, Ohio
- Semikhah: Rav Eliyahu Meir Bloch; Rav Chaim Mordechai Katz

Nachum Zev (Velvel) Dessler (1921 – January 23, 2011) was an Orthodox Jewish rabbi as well as founder and dean of the Hebrew Academy of Cleveland.

Dessler was also instrumental in building the National Society for Hebrew Day Schools.

== Personal life ==
Dessler was born in 1921 in Kelm to Rabbi Eliyahu Eliezer and Bluma Dessler. His mother, Bluma, was a granddaughter to Rabbi Simcha Zissel Ziv and Dessler was named after Rabbi Simcha Zissel Ziv's son. In 1929, the family moved to London and Dessler was sent to Yeshivah Etz Chaim. Three years later, he returned to Wilkomir in Lithuania to learn.
