= Mordechai Omer =

Mordechai Omer

Mordechai Omer (Hebrew: מרדכי עומר; April 1941 - 10 June 2011) was an Israeli art historian and museum administrator who served as Director of the Tel Aviv Museum of Art.

Born in Haifa, he was educated at the Hebrew University of Jerusalem (BA Art History, 1961), Columbia University under Meyer Schapiro (MA Art History, 1968) and the University of East Anglia (PhD, 1976) where his doctoral dissertation was on the biblical subjects of J. M. W. Turner supervised by John Gage.

Omer lived in the United States from 1967–1972, studying and working at the Museum of Modern Art New York. He lived in Hampstead, London 1972-1975 whilst completing his doctorate.

He held a professorship in Art History at the University of Tel Aviv from 1986 and was also head of the University’s Museum Studies Program. Omer was guest curator for the São Paulo Biennial (1987 and 1989) and the Commissioner of the Israel Pavilion at the Venice Biennale (2003). He served as Director and Chief Curator of the Tel Aviv Museum of Art from 1995 until his death in 2011 and was instrumental in the commissioning of the Herta and Paul Amir Building.

Omer died from cancer after a short period of illness and was buried in Har Hamenuchot cemetery, Jerusalem. Tel Aviv Mayor Ron Huldai was among those who delivered eulogies

== Publications ==
  - J.M.W. Turner and the Romantic Vision of the Holy Land and the Bible McMullen Museum of Art, Boston College, Boston 1996 ISBN 9780964015357
  - Turner and the Bible The Ashmolean Museum, Oxford, 1981, ISBN 9780900090790
  - Turner und die DichtkunstBayerische Staatsgemäldesammlung, München, 1976 ISBN 3788095695
  - Turner And The Poets: Engravings And Watercolours From His Later Period ISBN 9780716807032
  - Dina Recanati Passage 2001, Tel Aviv Museum, Israel ISBN B000OK6BBI
  - Avigdor Arikha: Drawings Tell Aviv Museum,1998, Israel
  - Hiriya In the Museum Artists and Architect Tel Aviv Museum, 1999 ISBN 9789657161005
  - Adam Berg, Adam Berg (Illustrations), Mordechai Omer (Text), 2008, Tel Aviv ISBN 9788881586400
  - Enzo Cucchi original title Enzo Cucchi: The Tel Aviv Mosaic Charta 2000, Tel Aviv, ISBN 9788881582709
  - Samuel Beckett by Avigdor Arikha, Victoria and Albert Museum, London, 1976
  - Universo y Magia De Joan Ponc Ediciones Poligrafa, Barcelona, 1971
