= Avraham Yitzchak Bloch =

Lithuanian rabbi (1891–1941)

Rabbi Avraham Yitzchak Bloch הרב אברהם יצחק בלוך
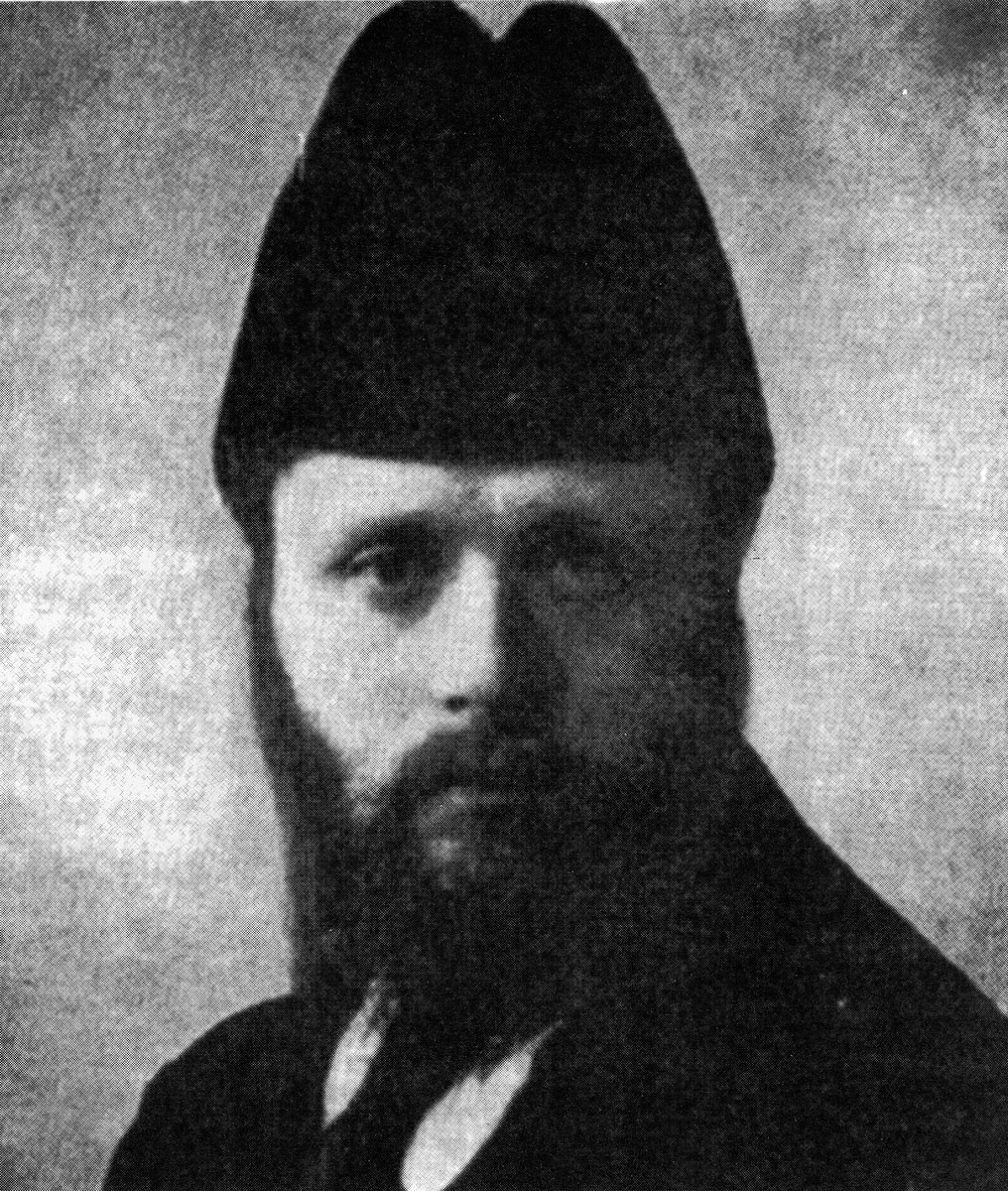

Personal life
- Born: January 1, 1890
- Died: July 13, 1941 (aged 51)
- Parent: Rabbi Yosef Yehuda Leib Bloch (father)

Religious life
- Religion: Judaism
- Denomination: Orthodox Judaism
- Yeshiva: Telshe Yeshiva
- Position: Rabbi of Telz
- Main work: Shiurei Rabbeinu HaGraAI miTelz, the essay "Teshuva Be'inyan Limudei Chol"

Avraham Yitzchak Bloch (Hebrew: אברהם יצחק בלוך; 1891 - July 15, 1941) was the Rosh yeshiva of the Telz Yeshiva in Lithuania, and one of the greatest pre-Holocaust rabbinic figures.

== Early life ==
Avraham Yitzchak Bloch was born in 1891 into a Jewish family and was the second son of Rabbi Yosef Leib Bloch, the Rosh yeshiva of Telz. He represented the third generation of family leadership in Telz, as his grandfather Rabbi Eliezer Gordon was also Rosh yeshiva in Telz. Bloch was educated by both his father and grandfather.

== Telzer Rav and Rosh Yeshiva ==
Upon the death of Yosef Leib Bloch in 1929, it was widely assumed that his oldest son, Rabbi Zalman Bloch would succeed his father as Rosh yeshiva of Telz, as was the custom in many communities. At the funeral Zalman announced that the position should be filled by his younger brother. At the age of 38, Avraham Yitzchak succeeded his father as Rosh Yeshiva of Telz, which was one of the largest and most prestigious yeshivas in Europe.

Bloch traveled to the United States in 1928 on a successful fundraising campaign. Bloch continued to develop the educational methodology pioneered by his father. This method is known as the Telzer Derekh, a unique analytical approach to Torah study.

Bloch was also a member of the Moetzes Gedolei HaTorah of the Agudath Israel and participated at the third Knessia Gedolah of the Agudath Israel at Marienbad, Austria in 1937.

== World War II ==
In 1940, the town of Telz was invaded by Soviet forces. Shortly thereafter, the yeshiva was forced to surrender its main building for use as a Red Army barracks. The students remained in Telz, where they rented accommodation from local townsfolk. This also changed, when the Soviets forbade the renting out of rooms to yeshiva students. Bloch responded by dispersing the yeshiva to five surrounding towns and arranging for members of the faculty to travel from town to town to deliver classes to his students.

On Tuesday July 15, 1941 (20th Tammuz), Nazi Einsatzgruppen and local Lithuanian sympathizers massacred the male population of Telz, including Bloch himself and the faculty of the yeshiva. Three of Bloch's daughters survived the Holocaust. Rochel married Rabbi Baruch Sorotzkin who joined the Telz Yeshiva in Cleveland, Ohio, and later served as the Rosh yeshiva. Another married Rabbi Aizik Ausband, a student of Telz in Lithuania who also became a Rosh yeshiva at the Telz Yeshiva in Cleveland, Ohio. The third daughter Miriam married Yosef Yehudah Leib Kleiner; they met and married in a DP camp in Germany after the war, they immigrated to Israel in 1951.

== Published works ==
Bloch was both a prolific writer and speaker yet many of his writings were lost during the Holocaust. Some notes of Rabbi Bloch's lectures were rescued by students who escaped the Holocaust, and published by Bloch's family:

- Shiurei HaGrai Bloch on the Talmudic Tractates of Chullin and Yevamos.
- Shiurei Daas - A collection of essays on a variety of topics viewed from the unique Telz method of analysis.
