= Eliezer Gordon =

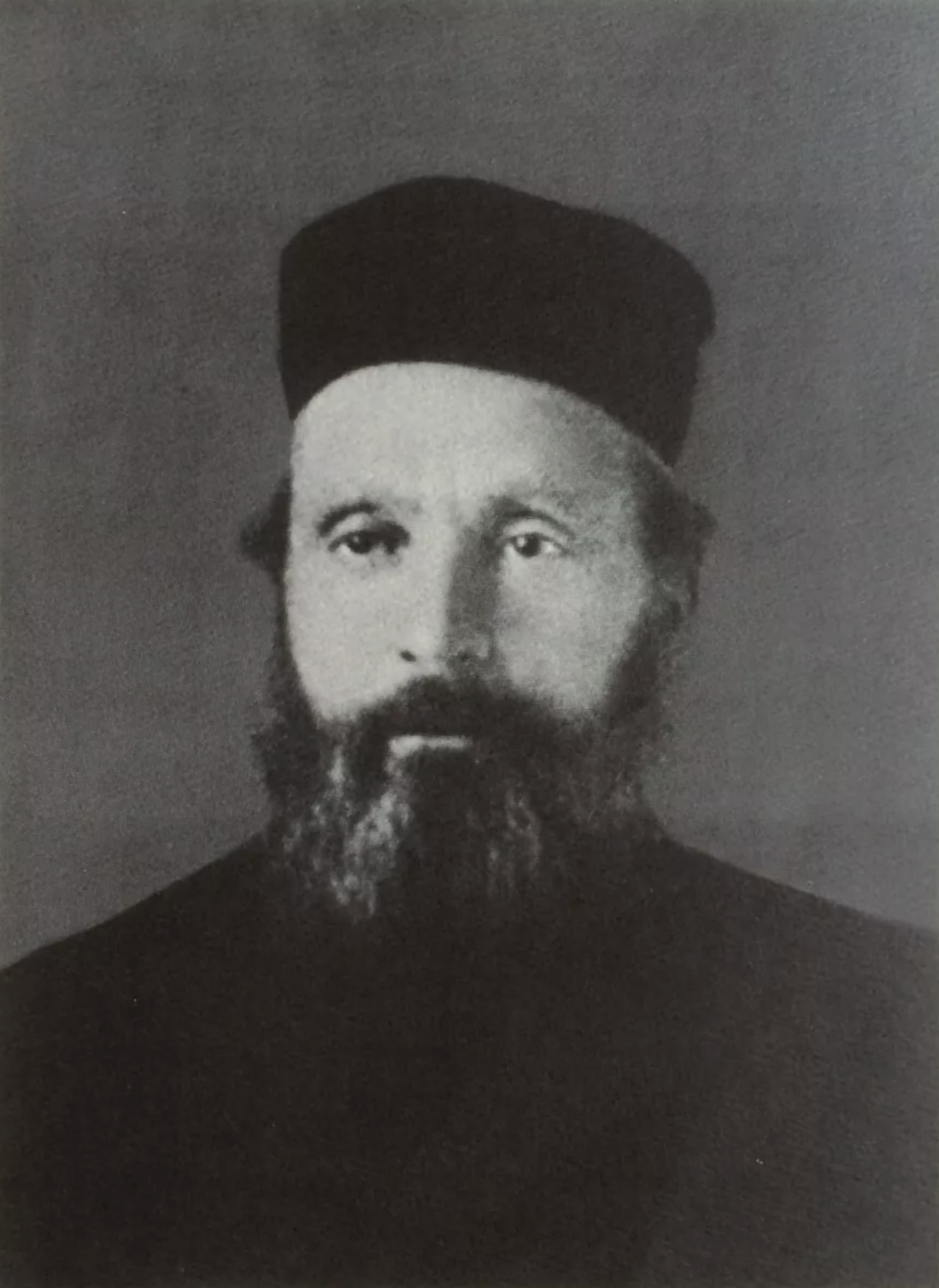
- Born: 1841; Chernyaty, near Svir, Belarus
- Died: 1910 (age 68 or 69 years old); London, United Kingdom
- Father: Avraham Shmuel Gordon

Rabbi Eliezer Gordon (Hebrew: אליעזר גוֹרְדוֹן; 1841–1910) also known as Reb Laizer Telzer (לייזער טעלזער), served as the rabbi and rosh yeshiva of Telz, Lithuania.

== Early years ==
Eliezer Gordon was born in 1841 in the village of Chernyaty (or Chernian in Yiddish), Belarus, near Svir. His father, Avrohom Shmuel Gordon, was a student of Chaim of Volozhin. As a youngster, he studied in the Zaretza Yeshiva in Vilna, later transferring to the Yeshiva of Yisroel Salanter at the Kovno kollel yeshiva in Kovno. Concurrent outstanding fellow students included Yitzchak Blazer, Simcha Zissel Ziv, Naftali Amsterdam, Yerucham Perlman and Jacob Joseph.

Salanter realized that Gordon had great potential and appointed him as a maggid shiur in the yeshiva at a young age. After his father-in-law's death, Gordon succeeded the latter as rabbi of Kovno — but he only stayed for three months. On Tuesday, 24 March (6th Nissan) 1874, Gordon took over the position of Chief Rabbi at Kelm, where he remained for nine years and founded a Yeshiva. From there, he headed to Slabodka, where he served as rabbi for about six months. He finally relocated to Telz in 1884, to serve as Rabbi.

== Telz ==
In 1875, rabbis Meir Atlas, Zvi Yaakov Oppenheim and Shlomo Zalman Abel had founded the Telz Yeshiva.

In 1883 Gordon became the rabbi of Telz; in 1884 he was also appointed head of the fledgling institution.

Gordon instituted numerous innovative ideas in the yeshiva which have since become accepted as standard practice in many contemporary yeshivas:

1. Hitherto, yeshivas grouped all their students into one general shiur (class). Gordon, however, divided the yeshiva into different shiurim commensurate with a student's age and intellectual level.
2. Gordon also promoted a new approach to curriculum in the yeshiva, based primarily on logic and the understanding of the Talmud. While other yeshivas primarily analyzed the later commentaries on the Talmud, such as the Pnei Yehoshua, Maharsha and Maharam Schiff, Gordon directed students to probe the earlier works of the Rishonim, such as Ramban, Rashba and Ritva. Nonetheless, he also included the works of certain Acharonim into the curriculum, such as the Ketzos Hachoshen, Nesivos Hamishpat and Rabbi Akiva Eiger's works.
3. As a student of Salanter, Gordon favored the study of musar (ethical) literature in the yeshiva, however not as mandatory study for all students. Gordon appointed a special teacher of ethics (mashgiach) to supervise the students spiritual development and to shape their characters. The yeshiva's first musar mashgiach was Ben Zion Kranitz, a student of Simcha Zissel Ziv of Kelm. Kranitz was very mild mannered, and did not force his students to accept the musar movement approach. In 1897, however, Gordon engaged a new musar mashgiach - the dynamic Leib Chasman, who instituted a very strict musar regime in the yeshiva. Many of the students opposed this approach, which caused so much dissent among the student body that he eventually left the Yeshiva.

Gordon also felt that important to the success of the yeshiva was employing the highest standard of teachers. Under Gordon's leadership, the yeshiva hired Shimon Shkop, Yosef Leib Bloch and Chaim Rabinowitz ("Reb Chaim Telzer"). Gordon tried, unsuccessfully to hire Yitzchok Yaakov Rabinowitz ("Reb Itzele Ponovezher") to teach at the yeshiva. Gordon himself delivered the highest-level shiur.

=== Communal activities ===
As Rav, he instituted some rules, including that Matzah bakeries must close by 11 p.m. Publicly he said it was for Kashrus, that the workers not exceed the 18 minutes from adding water, but privately he conceded that it was to prevent exploitation of workers.

His son-in-law Zalman Sorotzkin helped in his monitoring of honest weights and measures.

Gordon's approach to Zionism and the haskalah was complex

Gordon was very vocal in his opposition to Zionism and wrote and spoke much on the subject. He warned those Jews who were not yet wary of what he perceived as the evils of Zionism to just look at what Herzl himself said and wrote about the Jewish people, and they would understand what the movement was really about. He also said that those that join with the Zionists are transgressing the sin of "V'Lo Sasim damim bveisecha" - (Do not cause death to be in your home). They are also "giving an opening and support to antisemites".

== Death ==
In 1908, a fire broke out in Telz, destroying all of the wooden homes in the town, including the yeshiva. In 1910, Gordon, who was nearly 70, traveled to Berlin and London along with his wife and younger friend Aharon Walkin of Pinsk — the author of Teshuvos Zekan Aharon — to raise funds for rebuilding the homes and the yeshiva. It was the first time a Lithuanian Rosh Yeshiva had traveled to England to raise funds. I It was winter, and Gordon's doctors warned him that England's weather was dangerous to his health, especially since he had suffered a heart attack a few years earlier. Nonetheless, Gordon could not be deterred.

While in London, Gordon suffered a fatal heart attack.

Dayan Shmuel Yitzchok Hillman of Glasgow and several leading European Rabbis (who were in London at the time) such as Moshe Mordechai Epstein of Slabodka, and Yaakov Dovid Wilovsky (the Ridvaz) of Slutzk delivered tearful eulogies in Yiddish. Eulogies were also delivered in English by Dayan Moses Hyamson of the London Beth Din and Dr Moses Gaster, Haham of the Spanish and Portuguese community. Gordon was buried in the Edmonton Federation Cemetery.

== Writings ==
His sefer Teshuvos Rabbi Eliezer was published posthumously (Pietrokov, 5673/1913).

His sefer Chidueshei Rabbi Eliezer is printed in the back of Teshuvos Rabbi Eliezer, vol. 2
