= Barkin =

Barkin (Russian: Баркин; Hebrew: ברקין) is a Hebrew surname, originated as the simplified form of Bar-Kohen (Hebrew: בר-כהן), which means "son (of a) Kohen" (Israelite priest of the tribes) .Notable people with the surname include:

- Dovid Barkin (1945–2006), American rosh yeshiva
- Elaine Barkin (1932–2023), American composer, writer, and educator
- Ellen Barkin (born 1954), American actress
- Thomas Barkin (born 1961), American banker

== See also ==
- Barkin' Bill Smith, an American singer
