= Naftoli Carlebach =

German-born American-Israeli Orthodox rabbi

Naftoli (Naphtali) Carlebach (Hebrew: נפתלי קרליבך; 1916–2005) was an Orthodox Jewish rabbi and accountant.

== Early life ==
Carlebach was born in Leipzig, Germany to Moses (Moshe) Carlebach, a son of Salomon Carlebach, the av beit din (head of the rabbinical court) of Lübeck, Germany. His maternal grandfather was Joseph Cohn, the av beit din of Eschwege, Germany.

In 1933, at age 16, his parents sent him to study Torah at the Telz Yeshiva in Lithuania. Subsequently, he transferred to the Mir Yeshiva.

In 1938, Carlebach was ordained as a rabbi by the heads of the Telz and Mir yeshivas. He also received rabbinical ordination from Rabbi Simcha Zelig, the posek of Brest, Belarus.

== America ==
In the year preceding World War II, Carlebach narrowly escaped the Holocaust through the aid of Naftoli Neuberger, the principal of Yeshivas Ner Yisroel in Baltimore, who sent him an entry visa. There Carlebach wed his wife, Gittel Gutman, who had also come from Germany. Following his wedding, Rabbi Yaakov Yitzchok Ruderman, rosh yeshiva (dean) of Ner Yisroel, encouraged Rabbi Carlebach to accept the rabbinate at Chambersburg, Pennsylvania.

Two years later, they moved to Detroit, where he worked in Jewish education, teaching at the Yeshiva Beth Yehudah and in the rabbinate. He was instrumental in bringing key rabbinic personnel to Detroit, such as Rabbi Leib Bakst. Carlebach forfeited his positions in Detroit in deference to his older uncle and instead worked as an accountant in Boro Park, Brooklyn, establishing the "Mir Minyan" there (located in Yeshivas Be'er Shmuel on 12th Ave.).

He made aliyah to Israel in 1979 and spent time learning Torah in the yeshivas of Mir, Kamenitz and near his home until his death. Rabbi Aryeh Finkel, the rosh yeshiva of the Mir Yeshiva in Brachfeld, Rabbi Yitzchok Ezrachi, a son-in-law of Rabbi Chaim Leib Shmuelevitz, and others eulogized.
