= Zalman Sorotzkin =

Ukrainian Orthodox rabbi

Rabbi Zalman Sorotzkin זלמן סורוצקין

Personal life
- Born: 1880/1881 Žagarinė (or Žagarė), Lithuania
- Died: June 27, 1966 (85-86) Jerusalem, Israel
- Buried: Har HaMenuchot, Jerusalem, Israel
- Spouse: Miriam
- Children: Rabbi Elchanan; Rabbi Boruch; Rabbi Eliezer; Rabbi Yisrael; Rabbi Bentzion
- Parents: Rabbi Bentzion (father); Chaina (mother)
- Education: Volozhin Yeshiva; Slabodka Yeshiva; Telz Yeshiva

Religious life
- Religion: Judaism
- Denomination: Haredi

Jewish leader
- Predecessor: Rabbi Isser Zalman Meltzer (Moetzes)
- Synagogue: Dziatłava; Lutsk
- Organisation: Moetzes Gedolei HaTorah
- Other: Chairman of Chinuch Atzmai
- Yahrtzeit: 9 Tammuz 5726

Zalman Sorotzkin, also known as the Lutzker Rav (Hebrew: זלמן סורוצקין; 1881–1966), was an Orthodox rabbi who served as the rabbi of Lutsk, Ukraine.

By the end of his life he was noted for his leadership of Moetzes Gedolei HaTorah (Council of Torah Sages, Agudath Israel) The main street in Jerusalem's Kiryat Itri neighborhood, Rechov Sorotzkin, is named after him.

== Biography ==
Sorotzkin was born in Žagarinė (or Zakhrina), in 1881. Initially, he studied with his father, Rabbi Ben-Zion Sorotzkin, who was the town's rabbi. He then studied in the yeshivas of Volozhin, Slabodka, and Telz.

He was a son-in-law of the Telzer rav and rosh yeshiva, Rabbi Eliezer Gordon; Sorotzkin's wife's name was Miriam. When Gordon died in 1910, Sorotzkin was offered the position as rabbi and rosh yeshiva in Telz. He did not accept the position and was shortly thereafter appointed Rabbi of Voranava, Belarus (near Vilna). This enabled him to establish a close relationship with Rabbi Chaim Ozer Grodzenski. In Voranava, Rabbi Sorotzkin established a yeshiva ketana.

After two years in Voranava, Rabbi Sorotzkin moved to Dziatłava (known as Zittel or Zhetel: זשעטל in Yiddish), where he served as rabbi for eighteen years. As Zhetel was the birthplace of the Chofetz Chaim, the Chofetz Chaim would affectionately refer to Rabbi Sorotzkin as "my" rav.

In 1914, owing to the German invasion, Rabbi Sorotzkin moved to Minsk and became a close friend of the Chazon Ish, who rented a room from Rabbi Sorotzkin. Upon the end of the war, Rabbi Sorotzkin returned to Zhetel.

In 1930, he was appointed rabbi in Lutsk, where he remained until World War II. During the early days of the war, when many yeshivas had to relocate, Sorotzkin served as the head of the Vaad Hayeshivos, at the behest of Chaim Ozer Grodzenski. Sorotzkin managed to flee the war and escape to Mandate Palestine.

When the Moetzes Gedolei HaTorah (Council of Torah Sages) of the Agudath Israel was founded in Israel, Sorotzkin was appointed vice chairman "(and after the death of Isser Zalman Meltzer served as its chairman ... until his death)."

In 1953, the Chinuch Atzmai was formed and Sorotzkin was chosen to head it.

== Death and legacy ==
Sorotzkin died in Israel on June 27, 1966 (after sunset, 9 Tammuz 5726). He is buried on Har HaMenuchot.

Sorotzkin authored the works, Oznaim LaTorah, a commentary on the Torah, Sheailos Utshuvos Moznaim LaMishpat (1955) and HaDeah ve-ha-Dibur (1937) which is a collection of derashot. His commentary Ha-Shir ve-ha-Shevach on the Passover Haggadah (1971) was published posthumously.

He was survived by five sons: Rabbis Elchonon Sorotzkin, author of Leman Achai VeRai and leader of the Chinuch Atzmai; Baruch Sorotzkin, rosh yeshiva of the Telz yeshiva in Cleveland, Ohio; Eliezer Sorotzkin, founder of Kiryat Telz-Stone in Israel; Yisrael Sorotzkin, rosh yeshiva in Lomza and Av Beit Din in Petah Tikva; and Benzion Sorotzkin, leader of Chinuch Atzmai.
