= Moriah School =

Coordinates: 40.884474°N 73.961573°W

The Moriah School
- בית ספר מוריה

Location
- 53 South Woodland Street; Englewood, NJ 07631; United States

Information
- Type: Modern Orthodox Jewish day school
- Established: 1965
- School district: district 13
- Director: Erik Kessler
- Principal: Rabbi Daniel Alter
- Faculty: 98.3 (on FTE basis)
- Grades: Toddler-8
- Enrollment: 760 (2024-2025)
- Student to teacher ratio: 100.100:1
- Colors: Blue and Gold
- Website: School website

The Moriah School is a Modern Orthodox Jewish day school located in Englewood, New Jersey. It educates nearly 800 students from toddler through eighth grade.

The Moriah School was founded in 1964 by Rabbi Isaac L. Swift to serve as a cornerstone for Jewish education in Northern New Jersey. The school originally opened in the basement of Rabbi Swift’s synagogue, Congregation Ahavath Torah in Englewood, with a founding class of 12 students. Swift's vision was to create a 'dual-curriculum' institution that synthesized traditional Torah study with rigorous secular academics, a model that helped transform Englewood into a hub of Modern Orthodoxy.

As of the 2024-25 school year, the school had an enrollment of 740 students in grades T-8 and 102 classroom teachers (on an FTE basis), for a student–teacher ratio of 6.7.

== Notable alumni ==
- Tali Farhadian (born 1974/1975), former US federal prosecutor.
- Kevie Feit, former mayor of Teaneck, New Jersey.
- Yakir Forman, winner of the diaspora section of the 2007 International Bible Contest.
- Eric Leiderman ('05), co-founder of Masorti on Campus, and winner of the Shoshana S. Cardin Leadership Award.
- Marc Poleyeff ('05), Director of Education at Aish Gesher Yeshiva in Jerusalem.. Notably, great-grandson of his namesake, Yeshiva University Rosh Yeshiva, Rav Moshe Aharon Poleyeff.
- Joshua Prager, reporter and author.
- Rick Schwartz (born c. 1968), film producer.

== רובו CUP Participation ==
In March 2017, twelve eighth graders from the Moriah school competed in the first annual רובו CUP competition at Ben Porat Yosef. The students faced teams from Ben Porat Yosef and Yavneh Academy. Moriah students won first prize with their glove-controlled RC car to help paralysis victims.
