= Azriel Rabinowitz =

Rabbi Azriel Rabinowitz (Hebrew: עזריאל רבינוביץ; 1905 – 15 July 1941) was a rosh yeshiva at the Telshe yeshiva of Lithuania and one of the youngest pre-Holocaust rosh yeshivas.

== Biography ==
He was born in Telz, Lithuania, in 1905, into a Jewish family, the son of Rabbi Chaim Rabinowitz (Reb Chaim Telzer) (1856–1930), one of the rosh yeshivas at the Telshe yeshiva, and Osnat Geffen (1880–1942). Rabbi Azriel was a brilliant young man and by the age of 20 had mastered the entire Talmud in depth.

Upon the death of his father in 1931, he was appointed to the faculty of the yeshiva at the young age of 26. The following year, he married Channa (1908–1941), daughter of Rabbi Mordechai Zev Dzikansky, with whom he had three children, Chaim (1932–1941), Avigdor (1935–1941), and Shoshana.

== Teaching style ==
His ability to go through a volume, absorb its contents in depth and remember everything, in a matter of several hours, distinguished him from his colleagues. His students relate how on occasion, Rabbi Rabinowitz would leave the yeshiva thinking over a particular Talmudic concept, and became so engrossed that he was unaware that he had walked all the way out of the town's boundaries. Indeed, despite his youth he was one of the greatest Torah scholars of his generation. He behaved modestly, not wanting to bring any special attention to himself. His complete knowledge and understanding of the requirements of mitzvot, would never impel him to render halachic decisions for others, because he did not want to assume such a great responsibility.

Rabbi Rabinowitz organized lectures in his own home to assist students who were finding the transition from the mechina (preparatory school), to the yeshiva proper, a difficult one. He also arranged lectures at his home on the subjects found in the second half of the Talmudic Tractate being studied in the yeshiva, which was not lectured on by the faculty.

== Telz massacre ==
On Tuesday, 15 July (20 Tammuz) 1941, Nazi forces and local Lithuanian sympathizers massacred the male population of Telz, including Rabbi Azriel Rabinowitz and the faculty of the Telshe yeshiva. His wife and children were murdered on 17 August 1941.

Almost all of Rabbi Rabinowitz's writings were lost in the Holocaust. A few lectures recorded by students have been published in Talmudic journals.
