= Mordechai Gifter =

20th-century American rabbi and rosh yeshiva

Rabbi Mordechai Gifter
- Gifter in 1988

Personal life
- Born: October 15, 1915 Portsmouth, Virginia, U.S.
- Died: January 18, 2001 (aged 85)
- Children: 6
- Parent: Yisroel Gifter

Religious life
- Religion: Judaism
- Denomination: Haredi Orthodox Judaism

Jewish leader
- Predecessor: Chaim Mordechai Katz
- Position: Rosh yeshiva
- Yeshiva: Telz Yeshiva
- Began: 1964
- Ended: January 18, 2001

Mordechai Gifter (October 15, 1915 - January 18, 2001) was an American Haredi rabbi. He was the rosh yeshiva (dean) of the Telz Yeshiva in Cleveland. He lived in Israel for approximately two years, and is buried there.

Gifter studied in yeshivas in Lithuania, and held several rabbinical positions in the United States.

== Early life and education ==
Gifter was born in Portsmouth, Virginia to Yisrael and Matla (May) Gifter. He was raised in Baltimore, Maryland, where his father owned a grocery. He attended the Baltimore City Public Schools, at the time being known as Max, and received his religious education in after-school programs. He had a younger brother and sister, and both predeceased him.

As a young man, Gifter studied at the Rabbi Isaac Elchonon Theological Seminary in New York City, under the tutelage of Moshe Aharon Poleyeff and Moshe Soloveichik. His uncle, Samuel Saar (Yehudah Leib), was the dean of the seminary. At the time, Avigdor Miller, also a Baltimore native, was learning in RIETS. On Saar's advice, Gifter traveled in 1932 to Lithuania on the same boat as Miller to study in the Telshe Yeshiva. Gifter was immediately accepted for admission and placed in advanced classes. He developed a strong bond with Zalman Bloch, the mashgiach ruchani (spiritual supervisor) at the yeshiva. He eventually became engaged to Bloch's daughter. In 1939, prior to his wedding, Gifter returned home to the United States to visit his parents in Baltimore. He planned on returning to Lithuania for his wedding and to resume his studies.

When it became obvious that he would be unable to return due to the political climate of the late 1930s, Gifter arranged for his bride's family to join him in the United States. Only his bride came; the family chose not to abandon their community in its time of greatest need. The Gifters married in Baltimore, with Mrs. Gifter's family still in war-torn Lithuania. One of the witnesses at Gifter's wedding was Bernard Lander, then a rabbi in Baltimore and later founder of Touro College.

== Career ==
In 1941, Gifter moved to Waterbury, Connecticut and assumed a rabbinic pulpit in that community. In 1944 Gifter moved to Cleveland, Ohio to join the faculty of the newly re-established Rabbinical College of Telshe, which was moved from Telshe, Lithuania to Cleveland. The original school and Telshe community were almost completely destroyed by the Nazis and Lithuanian militia. In 1964, he was appointed as dean together with Boruch Sorotzkin.

In 1977, Gifter brought 20 students from Cleveland to Israel and opened a branch of the college in the town of Kiryat Ye'arim (Telz-Stone), leaving Sorotzkin in charge of the Cleveland campus. When Sorotzkin died in 1979 Gifter was sent back to the United States to lead the Cleveland campus and the Israeli branch closed.

Gifter died in 2001.
