= Barquín =

Barquín or Barkin (modern Basque spelling) is a Basque surname widely present in the province of Biscay and Cantabria.

== People ==
- Pedro Zaballa Barquín, a Spanish footballer
- Francisco Bilbao Barquín, a Chilean writer
- Celia Barquín Arozamena, a Spanish golfer

== See also ==
- Basque surnames
