= Moshe Aharon Poleyeff =

American rabbi

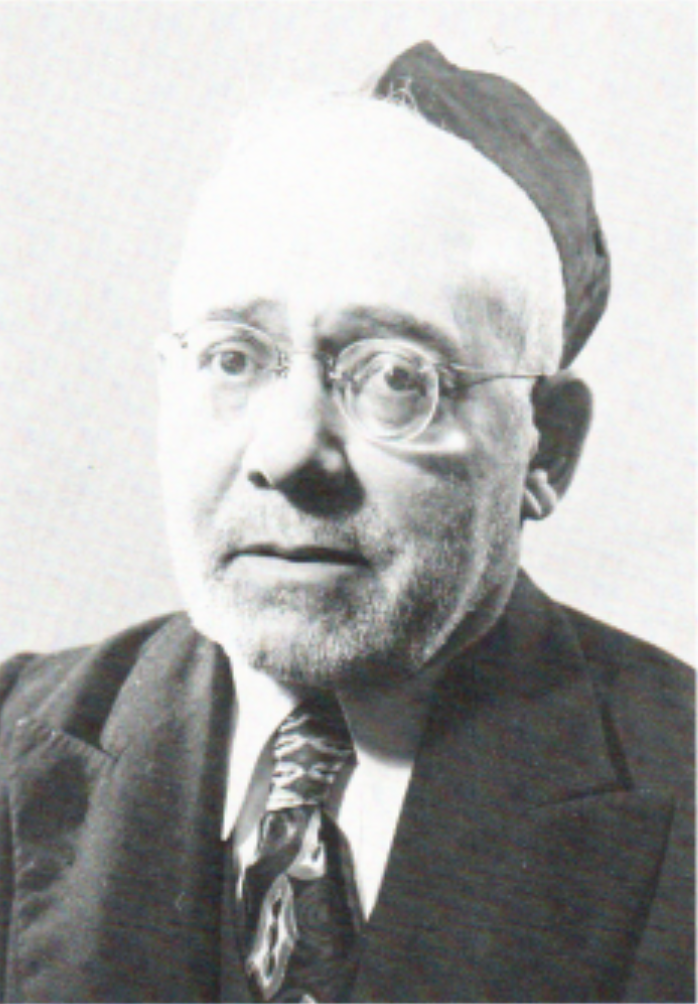
- Born: 1888; Timkovitz, Belarus
- Died: 1966 (aged 77–78); New York City
- Occupation: Rosh Yeshiva
- Spouse: Rochel
- Children: Rabbi Israel Poleyeff; Chaim Paley (Hymie); Abraham Paleyeff; Sarah Goldstein; Rosalind Rosenbaum

Moshe Aharon Poleyeff (1888 – 1966) was an American rabbi, teaching at Yeshiva University (YU) in New York where he was a Rosh Yeshiva for over 45 years, training generations of rabbis, including Mordechai Gifter.

== Biography ==
Poleyeff was born in 1888, in Timkovitz, near Slutsk, 98 km (61 mi) south of Minsk, Belarus (White Russia).

He was a student of Rabbi Isser Zalman Meltzer, by whom he was ordained in 1910. He married Rochel in 1912.

Poleyeff arrived in the United States in 1920, and immediately began a teaching career at Yeshiva University in New York, where for about 46 years he was a YU/RIETS Roshei Yeshiva and had thousands of students. His "Thursday Shiur" teaching methodology incorporated a student-presented topic, followed by discussion; he helped the student prepare the prior week or two.

Poleyeff died 2 Kislev 5727 (November 1966).

== Works ==
- Machaneh Yisroel
- Be'er Avraham
- Ohr HaShemesh
- Orach Mishor
