= Chaim Stein =

American rabbi and Talmudic scholar

Chaim Yaakov Stein (March 29, 1913 - June 29, 2011) is best known for leading the Telshe Yeshiva at two times in its history: Cleveland and Wickliffe.

== Biography ==
Stein was born to Binyamin Moshe and Miriam Stein in the Lithuanian hamlet of Skudvil, where he received his rabbinical ordination from a major Jewish school located in the area, Telshe Yeshiva.

During World War II he spent time in labor camps in Siberia. He escaped and was one of many Jews saved from the Holocaust by Japanese diplomat Chiune Sugihara, who granted them visas.

He later became a Rosh Yeshiva (dean) in Wickliffe, Ohio.

He and his wife, the former Friedel Zaks, had five children:
