= Meir Atlas =

Lithuanian rabbi

Rabbi Meir Atlas
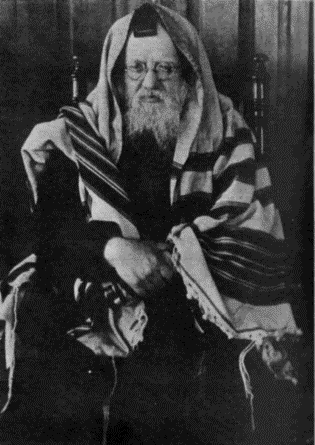

Personal life
- Born: 1848 Baisagola, Kovno Governorate, Russian Empire
- Died: 1926 (aged 77–78) Šiauliai, Lithuania
- Spouse: Chiena Atlas (née Zogerer)
- Parent(s): R' David and Golda Atlaz

Religious life
- Religion: Judaism
- Denomination: Haredi Judaism

Jewish leader
- Predecessor: Rabbi Yosef Zecharia Stern [HE]
- Successor: Rabbi Aharon Bakst [HE]
- Position: Rabbi
- Synagogue: Šiauliai, Lithuania
- Began: 1904
- Ended: 1926

Meir Atlas (Hebrew: מאיר אטלס; 1848–1926) was the rabbi of numerous communities in pre-World War II Europe and one of the founders of the Telz Yeshiva. He was an outstanding halachic authority who authored many responsa and was one of the foremost Lithuanian rabbis of his time.

== Biography ==
Rabbi Meir Atlas was born in 1848 in Baisagola, Lithuania. In 1875, together with Rabbi Zvi Yaakov Oppenheim, Rabbi Shlomo Zalman Abel and the help of a German Jewish layman, Ovadyah Lachman, Atlas founded the Telz Yeshiva in Telz, Lithuania. He later served as rabbi and spiritual leader in a number of cities, including Libau in Latvia, Salant in Lithuania, and Kobryn in Belarus. In 1904, Rabbi Atlas was appointed rabbi to the community of Shavel.

Meir's brother was Rabbi Eliezer Atlas. His daughter Michle was married to Rabbi Elchonon Wasserman, His other sons-in-law include Rabbi Chaim Ozer Grodzinski and Rabbi Yehudel Kahana Shapiro, the son of Rabbi Zalman Sender Kahana Shapiro. Rabbi Meir died on the 12th of Shevat in 1926.
