= Shlomo Zalman Abel =

Shlomo Zalman Halevi Abel (1857–1886) was one of the founders of the Telz Yeshiva and author of Beis Shlomo.

== Biography ==
Abel was born March 11, (15 Adar) 1857 at Novomyesto-Sugint (now Žemaičių Naumiestis) in the Kovno Governorate of the Russian Empire (present-day Lithuania).

In 1875, together with Meir Atlas and Zvi Yaakov Oppenheim, he assisted in establishing the Telz Yeshiva and subsequently taught there. He was the brother-in-law of Shimon Shkop.

Abel died on Tuesday October 12, (13th Tishrei) 1886.

== Works ==
- Beis Shlomo, published posthumously in Vilna in 1893, deals primarily with aspects of Halacha pertaining to financial matters.
