= Pene Yehoshua =

Pene Yehoshua may refer to the following works of Rabbinic literature:

- Commentary and novellae on the Talmud, by Jacob Joshua Falk, 1680–1756
- Responsa (She'elot u-Teshuvot Pene Yehoshua), by Rabbi Joshua Höschel ben Joseph, 1715
- Homilies in the order of the parashas, by Rabbi Joshua Falk, 1742
