= Yosef Leib Bloch =

Rabbi in Telshe, Lithuania (1860–1929)

Rabbi Yosef Yehudah Leib Bloch הרב יוסף יהודה לייב בלוך

Personal life
- Born: February 13, 1860 Raseiniai, Russian Empire present-day Lithuania
- Died: November 10, 1929 (aged 69) Telšiai, Lithuania
- Spouse: Chasya; Miriam; Taibe Freida
- Parents: Mordechai (father); Sara Basya (mother)
- Education: Kelm Talmud Torah

Religious life
- Religion: Judaism
- Denomination: Orthodox Judaism

Jewish leader
- Predecessor: Rabbi Eliezer Gordon
- Successor: Rabbi Avraham Yitzchak Bloch
- Yeshiva: Telshe Yeshiva
- Began: 1910
- Ended: 1929
- Main work: Sefer Shiurei Daas
- Other: President of Agudas HaRabbonim

Rabbi Yosef Yehudah Leib Bloch (February 13, 1860 – November 10, 1929) was a prominent rabbi and rosh yeshiva in Telshe (Telšiai), Lithuania.

== Early life ==
Bloch was born on February 13, 1860, in Raseiniai, Lithuania, then part of the Russian Empire, to Mordechai and Sara Basya Bloch. When he was eleven he left home to learn in the yeshiva Rabbi Moshe Charif in Vekshena, and at the age of thirteen (or fifteen), his parents sent him to Kelmė to study in the yeshiva of Rabbi Eliezer Gordon. Rabbi Nosson Tzvi Finkel (Slabodka), was living in Kelmė at that time, and brought Yosef Leib to study by Rabbi Simcha Zissel Ziv. In 1881 he married Gordon's oldest daughter, Chasya.

== Rabbinic career ==
In 1884, Gordon brought Bloch to the Telshe Yeshiva, which he headed, and in 1886, Bloch became a teacher in the yeshiva. When he and his father-in-law introduced the study of mussar (Torah ethics) into the curriculum, and then appointed Leib Chasman, a strong proponent of mussar, as mashgiach ruchani, many of the students rebelled, and Bloch left the yeshiva. In 1902, he became a rabbi in Varniai, and opened a yeshiva there. Two years later, he founded a yeshiva in Shadova (Šeduva). Among his students there was Chaim Mordechai Katz, future rosh yeshiva of the Telshe Yeshiva in Cleveland.

=== Return to Telshe ===
The Yavneh Seminary in Telshe

In 1910 Gordon died and Bloch returned to Telshe where he succeeded his father-in-law as community rabbi and rosh yeshiva. In the 1920s, to counter the influence of the Haskalah (the Jewish Enlightenment) on the city's youth, he founded elementary schools for boys and girls which incorporated secular studies, as opposed to a strictly Torah study-based curriculum; some criticized him for this initiative; he was backed by the Chofetz Chaim, one of the leaders of European Jewry at the time. Two teachers' seminaries were established, one for men (established in 1927) and one for women (established in 1930), under the name Yavneh Teachers' Seminary, to train adults to become teachers. In 1929, a kollel, called Kollel HaRabbonim, was created.

Aside from his leadership role as rabbi and rosh yeshiva in Telshe, Bloch also served as the head of the Agudas HaRabbonim of Lithuania, and was a member and supporter of the organization, Agudath Israel. He also wrote the Sefer Shiurei Daas and Sefer Shiurei Halachah.

Bloch died on November 10, 1929, in Telshe at the age of 69. His son, Rabbi Avraham Yitzchak Bloch, succeeded him as community rabbi as well as rosh yeshiva.

== Family ==
Bloch had eight children, among them rabbis Avraham Yitzchak Bloch, the last rosh yeshiva of Telshe in Lithuania before the Holocaust, and Eliyahu Meir Bloch, co-founder of the Telshe Yeshiva in Cleveland. His daughter, Perel Leah, married Rabbi Chaim Mordechai Katz, later the co-founder of the Telshe Yeshiva in Cleveland with Eliyahu Meir Bloch. His granddaughter (daughter of Avraham Yitzchak) was Rochel Sorotzkin, a teacher in Cleveland's Yavneh Seminary and wife of Rabbi Boruch Sorotzkin, rosh yeshiva of Telshe in Cleveland.
