= Yitzchok Sorotzkin =

American rabbi

Avrohom Yitzchok Sorotzkin (born October 1945) is a rabbi and writer and former Rosh Yeshiva (dean) of Telshe yeshiva who delivers the most advanced Talmudic lecture at the Mesivta of Lakewood. He is a member of the Moetzes Gedolei HaTorah (Council of Torah Sages).

== Biography ==
Sorotzkin is the son of Baruch Sorotzkin, a Rosh Yeshiva in Telshe Yeshiva whose position he inherited. Due to controversy concerning the leadership of the Telshe Yeshiva in Cleveland, Sorotzkin relocated to Lakewood, NJ.

Sorotzkin, in addition to having studied under his father, is also a student of Berel Soloveitchik.

Sorotzkin is the son-in-law of Yecheskel Grubner, Chief Rabbi of Detroit.

== Works ==
Sorotzkin has authored over seventy volumes of seforim, almost all of which are named one of the following two titles (this list is incomplete):

- Rinas Yitzchok רנת יצחק (Commentaries to Torah (three separate editions), Neviim and Ketuvim (each book being a different volume), Commentary to the Siddur, Commentary to the Shabbat prayers, Commentary to Rosh Hashanna and Yom Kippur prayers)
- Gevuras Yitzchok גבורת יצחק (Commentaries to various Talmudic tractates, Pirkei Avos, Chumash, Laws of Teshuva, Laws of Torah study, Maimonides' Mishneh Torah, and on the holidays of Sukkos, Chanukah, Purim, and Shavuoth.)
