= Baruch Sorotzkin =

Rephoel Baruch Sorotzkin
- Speaking for Agudath Israel of America

Personal life
- Born: February 5, 1917 Dzyatlava, Grodno Governorate, Russian Empire (now Belarus)
- Died: February 10, 1979 (aged 62)
- Buried: Har HaMenuchot
- Spouse: Rachel Bloch
- Children: Yitzchok Sorotzkin; Binyomin Sorotzkin; Eliyahu Meir Sorotzkin; Rassia Busel; Chenia Schulman; Shoshana Herzka; Chassie Brog
- Parent(s): Zalman Sorotzkin and Miriam Gordon

Religious life
- Religion: Judaism
- Denomination: Haredi Orthodox Judaism

Jewish leader
- Predecessor: Chaim Mordechai Katz
- Successor: Mordechai Gifter
- Position: Rosh Yeshiva
- Yeshiva: Telz Yeshiva
- Began: 1964
- Ended: February 10, 1979

Rephoel Baruch Sorotzkin (February 5, 1917 – February 10, 1979) was the Rosh Yeshiva (dean) of the Telz Yeshiva in Cleveland.

He was born on February 5, 1917 (13th of Shevat, 5677) in Zhetl, in the Grodno Governorate of the Russian Empire (present-day Belarus). His father, Rabbi Zalman Sorotzkin was the town's rabbi. As a young man, Sorotzkin studied under Rabbi Elchonon Wasserman in the Baranovich Yeshiva, and then under Rabbi Baruch Ber Lebovitz in Kamenitz.

In 1940, Rabbi Boruch Sorotzkin married Rochel Bloch, daughter of the Telzer Rav and Rosh Yeshiva, Rabbi Avraham Yitzchak Bloch.

Sorotzkin was involved in the "tension" over visas needed to flee: the two factions were "those from Lithuanian versus Polish Yeshivot;" control of the Kobe committee was by "students from the Polish yeshivot." The rabbi and his wife fled Europe at the start of World War II, via Shanghai, and made their way to the United States. There, they joined his wife's uncles (and his own cousins) Rabbi Eliyahu Meir Bloch and Rabbi Chaim Mordechai Katz who had re-established the Telz Yeshiva in Cleveland, Ohio.

== Teaching ==
In 1943 Sorotzkin began delivering classes in the yeshiva. In 1953 Sorotzkin was appointed associate dean of the yeshiva.

In 1962 Sorotzkin became dangerously ill and the name Rephoel was added to his name. In 1964, when the Telz Rosh Yeshiva, Rabbi Chaim Mordechai Katz died, Sorotzkin together with Rabbi Mordechai Gifter assumed the leadership of the yeshiva.

In the Telzer tradition, Rabbi Sorotzkin extended his sphere of activities to include even more areas of communal responsibility, such as working for Chinuch Atzmai, Torah Umesorah and Agudath Israel of America where he served as one of the youngest member of its Moetzes Gedolei HaTorah - Council of Torah Sages.

== Death and family ==
Sorotzkin died on Saturday, February 10, 1979.

His brothers included rabbis Eliezer Sorotzkin, founder of Kiryat Telz-Stone in Israel, and Yisrael Sorotzkin, rosh yeshiva in Lomza and Av Beit Din in Petah Tikva.

His sons include Rabbi Yitzchok Sorotzkin, dean of the Telz Yeshiva and Mesivta of Lakewood, New Jersey.

Many of his lectures on Talmud were posthumously published by his children under the title Sefer Habinah V’habrachah.
