= Telshe Yeshiva (Chicago) =

Jewish school in Illinois, United States

Coordinates: 41°58′31.6″N 87°43′3.0″W

- Type: Private, Jewish
- Location: Chicago, Illinois, United States

Telshe Yeshiva (Chicago) (or Telshe Chicago or Telz Chicago) is a Yeshiva (Jewish Talmudical and Rabbinical School) in Chicago, Illinois. In 1960 (66 years ago).

== Prominent Rebbeim ==
Well-known Rebbeim at Telshe Yeshiva

- Rabbi Chaim Dov Keller
- Rabbi Avrohom Chaim Levin
