= Telshe Yeshiva =

Yeshiva founded in Lithuania

- הישיבה הגדולה והקדושה דטעלז

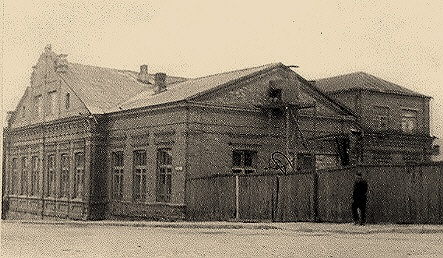
- Old photo of Telshe Yeshiva, Telšiai, Lithuania

Location
- 28400 Euclid Avenue; Wickliffe, (Lake County), Ohio 44092; United States
- Coordinates: 41°35′39″N 81°29′0″W

Information
- Type: Private high school, college, and post-graduate school
- Religious affiliation: Haredi Judaism
- Grades: 9-12, undergraduate, and graduate

Telshe Yeshiva (Yiddish: טעלזער ישיבה; Lithuanian: Telšių ješiva; also spelled Telz) is a yeshiva in Wickliffe, Ohio, formerly located in Telšiai, Lithuania. During World War II the yeshiva relocated to Cleveland, Ohio in the United States and is now known as the Rabbinical College of Telshe, commonly referred to as Telz Yeshiva, or Telz for short. In 1957, the yeshiva moved out of Cleveland proper to the Wickliffe suburb.

It is a Haredi (ultra-orthodox) institution of Torah study, with additional branches in Chicago (which eventually became its own institution, no longer associated with the Cleveland Yeshiva) and in New York. It is the successor of the New Haven Yeshiva of Cleveland.

== History ==
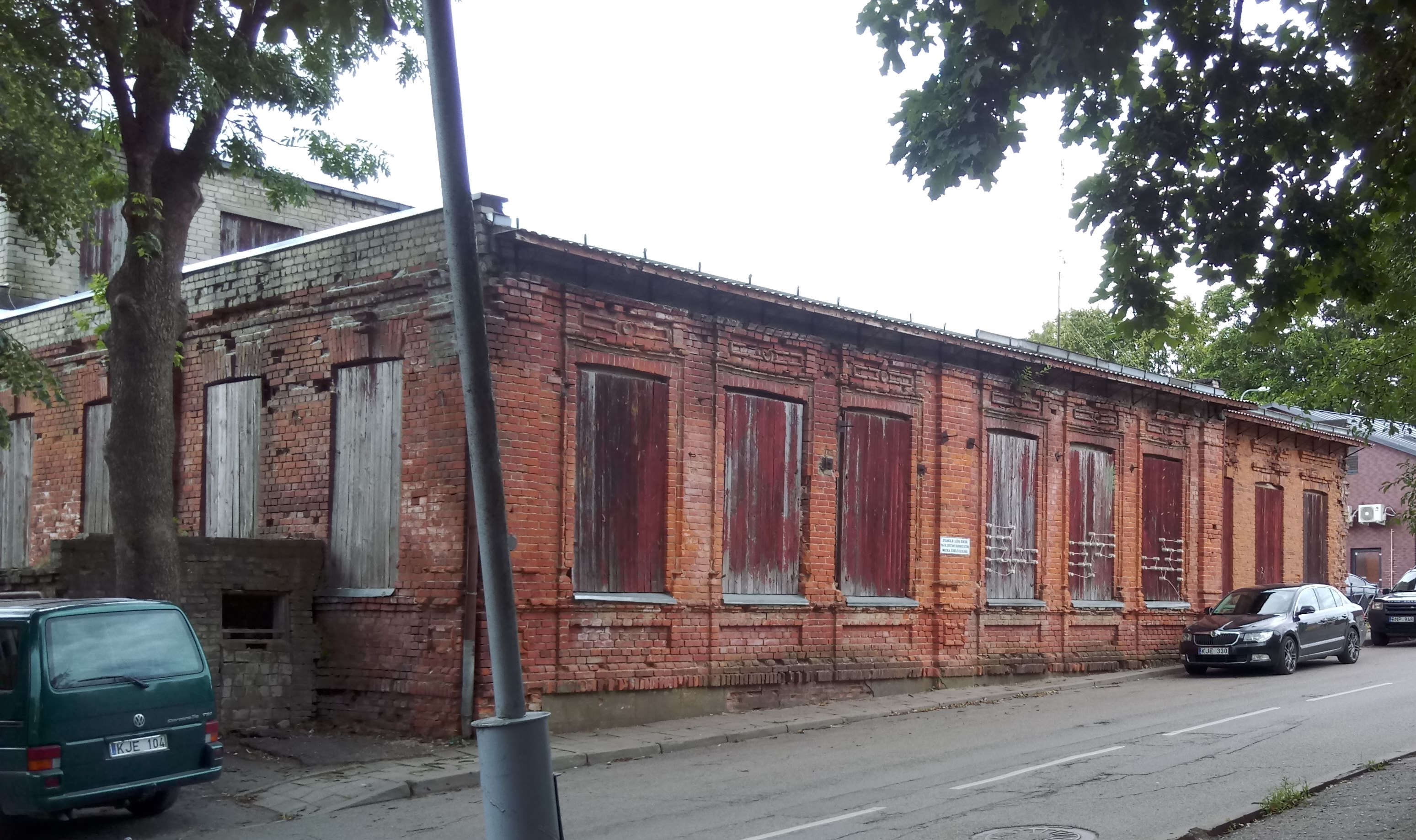
Telshe yeshiva building, Telšiai, Lithuania

The yeshiva was founded in 1875 in the town of Telshi (Lithuanian: Telšiai, Russian: Тельши, Yiddish: טעלז, romanized: Telz) in Kovno Governorate of the Russian Empire. By 1900 it was "one of the three largest yeshivot in Imperial Russia."

The yeshiva was established by three Orthodox rabbis and Talmudists:

- Meir Atlas, later the rabbi of Shavli and the father-in-law of Elchonon Wasserman and Chaim Ozer Grodzensky;
- Zvi Yaakov Oppenheim, who later became the rabbi of Kelm; and
- Shlomo Zalman Abel, the brother-in-law of Shimon Shkop.

=== Rabbi Zvi Yaakov Oppenheim ===
Zvi Yaakov Oppenheim (Hebrew: צבי יעקב אופנהיים; 1854–1926) was Chief Rabbi of Kelm, Lithuania, and one of the founders of the yeshiva. Oppenheim was born in 1854 in the small village of Yakubowe (now Jokūbavas, Kretinga district, Lithuania). He showed extraordinary talents from his earliest youth and at age nine could already study a page of Talmud with commentaries on his own. He was an orphan, and his relatives sent him to Trishik, where he studied with the local rabbi and teacher, Rabbi Lev Szpiro, a son of Rabbi Leibele Kovner.

From Trishik he traveled to the study group of Rabbi Yosef Rosin, who was then chief rabbi in Telz. He was already famous in Telz as a great scholar and while he was still a very young man, Rabbi Simcha Zissel Ziv chose him as the head of his modern mussar yeshiva. After several years there, he returned to Telz and taught Talmud to the students in the group in which he himself had once studied.

In 1883, Rabbi Eliezer Gordon relinquished the Kelm rabbinate and after a short period in Slabodka, became the rabbi in Telz. Through Rabbi Gordons's intercession, the twenty-nine-year-old Rabbi Oppenheim became the new Rabbi of Kelm.

Rabbi Oppenheim served as the rabbi in Kelm for forty-three years and died on Thursday, February 11 (27 of Shevat), 1926, at 72. He was succeeded as Rabbi of Kelm by his son in law, Rabbi Kalman Beineshovitz.

=== Rabbi Eliezer Gordon ===
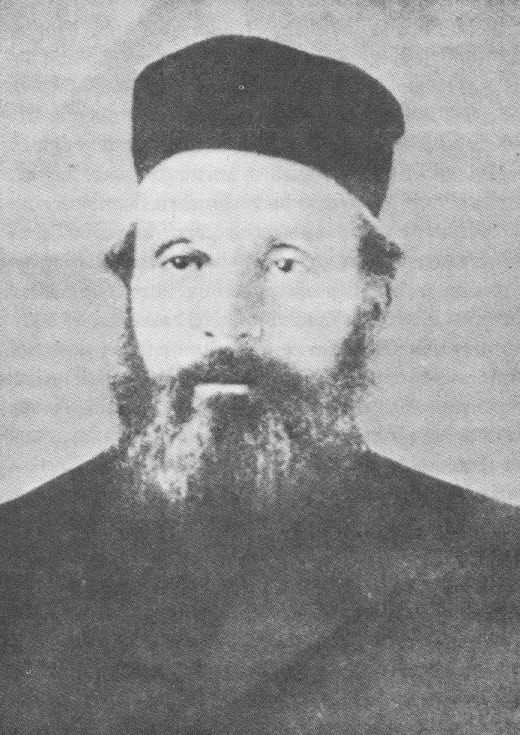
Eliezer Gordon

In 1883, Eliezer Gordon was appointed as the chief rabbi of the town of Telz and in 1884, rosh yeshiva (dean) of the yeshiva. A student of Yisrael Salanter, he had been a maggid shiur (lecturer) in Salanter's yeshiva, and a rabbi in Kelm, with a short stint in Slabodka (a suburb of Kaunas/Kovno). The yeshiva eventually became one of the largest in Imperial Russia. Gordon added his son-in-law, Yosef Leib Bloch, to the faculty, and in 1885, he hired Shimon Shkop.

In 1894, the yeshiva moved from its Telz community-provided building into a new facility. That year, it added a new subject of study, mussar (Jewish ethics). Ben Zion Kranitz was hired for a new faculty position: mussar mashgiach (teacher of ethics). In 1897 Gordon hired Leib Chasman, who instituted a very strict mussar regime in the yeshiva which many students opposed.

In 1902, Shkop left to become the rabbi of Breinsk, Lithuania. In 1905 Chaim Rabinowitz joined the yeshiva.

In 1910, while fundraising for the yeshiva in London, Gordon died of a heart attack.

=== Rabbi Yosef Leib Bloch ===
Gordon's son-in-law Yosef Leib Bloch became the community's rabbi and the rosh yeshiva. In 1920, he established primary schools in Telz for boys and girls, and also added a mechina ("preparatory school") to the yeshiva.

Parallel to an easier version of the yeshiva curriculum, the mechina also featured secular studies, another innovation at the time. In 1924 the Lithuanian government announced its decision to accredit only those rabbinical colleges that possessed a secular studies department. The Rabbinical College of Telshe was the only such institute, although secular studies were only in its mechina.

A kollel (postgraduate institute) opened in 1922, to train graduates for the rabbinate. Bloch's son-in-law Chaim Mordechai Katz was dean (rosh hakollel).

==== Yavneh School ====
In 1918, a teachers training institute was opened in Kovno but did not achieve much success. In 1925 The Yavneh School for the Training of Teachers reopened in Telz under the auspices of The Rabbinical College of Telshe. This served as a postgraduate institute, with the charter of producing teachers for Jewish schools. The curriculum at the teacher's institute included educational skills, Hebrew Bible, Talmud, the Hebrew language and literature and mathematics.

Yavneh Girls High School Building in Telz, Lithuania.

For many years the Jewish community in Lithuania had lacked a structured educational system for teenage girls. In 1927 a high school department for girls was established in Telshe.

In 1930, a sister institute to The Yavneh Teacher's Training Institute was opened by Joseph Leib Bloch of Telz. The school offered a two-year course to young women.

These various schools were all incorporated as a part of The Rabbinical College of Telshe.

In October 1930 Yosef Leib Bloch died and his second oldest son, Avraham Yitzchak Bloch succeeded him as both community rabbi and rosh yeshiva.

=== Rabbi Avraham Yitzchak Bloch ===
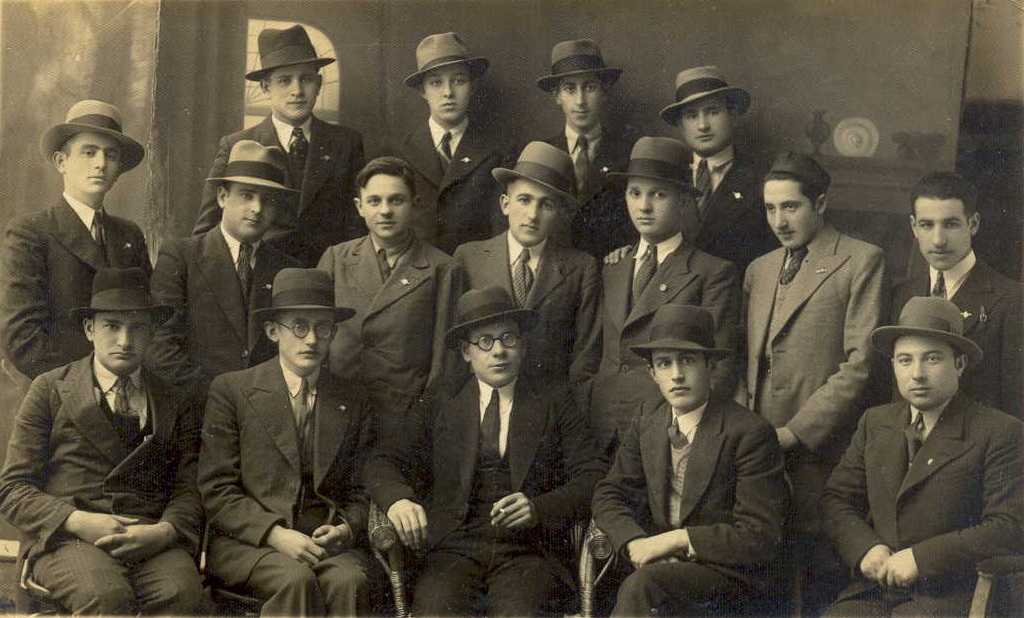
Students of Telshe on Purim 1936.

In the 1930s older students in the yeshiva were selected to teach for periods of time at new schools in small towns where there had previously been little or no structured schooling, and then return to continue their studies at the yeshiva.

Rabinowitz died in the year 1931 which was the year Yosef Leib Bloch and his son Azriel Rabinowitz, was appointed as a rosh yeshiva.

In 1933, the yeshiva built a new building to house the mechina ("preparatory school").

=== The Holocaust ===
In the fall of 1939, the Russians were allowed to bring troops into Lithuania on the pretext of defending the country. In June 1940, the Russians seized control of the country and quickly transformed it into the Lithuanian Soviet Socialist Republic. As part of this transformation, private Jewish organizations and schools were disbanded and the yeshiva was closed. Most of the students dispersed, with only about a hundred students remaining in Telshe. The learning was done in groups of 20-25 students, studying in various batai medrashim (small synagogues) led by the rosh yeshivas.

During the early years of World War II, Elya Meir Bloch and Chaim Mordechai Katz were in the United States on a fund-raising mission. After the war broke out they rebuilt the yeshiva in Cleveland Ohio.

In October 1940, a group of students led by Chaim Stein escaped via Russia. This group found its way to the United States in early 1941 and joined the Yeshiva in Cleveland.

== Telshe in the United States ==
The yeshiva was opened in Cleveland in the house of Yitzchak & Sarah Feigenbaum on November 10, 1941. As of 1954, it became officially titled the Rabbinical College of Telshe. They relocated to the Wickliffe location in 1957.

Telshe consists of a high school, college and post-graduate school. The yeshiva is a non-profit and is accredited through the Association of Advanced Rabbinical and Talmudic Schools. The yeshiva has a department of secular studies that grants a high school diploma.

In the United States the original faculty included Elya Meir Bloch, Chaim Mordechai Katz, Boruch Sorotzkin, Mordechai Gifter, and Chaim Stein.

The 2013 student count of 130 included 80 in grades 9-12; the highest student count, in 1966, was about 425.

== Notable alumni ==
Among the well-known alumni of the yeshiva are:

- Chaim Yitzchak Hacohen Bloch, Chief rabbi of Bausk and Plunge
- Noson Ordman, Rosh Yeshiva Etz Chaim Yeshiva (London)
- Naftoli Carlebach, Orthodox Jewish rabbi and accountant
- Nachum Zev Dessler, Cleveland, Ohio
- Haim Fishel Epstein, Lithuanian-American rabbi
- Azriel Goldfein, founding Rosh Yeshiva of Yeshivah Gedolah of Johannesburg
- Chaim Gutnick, Melbourne Australia
- Chaim Dov Keller, Chicago, Illinois. Rosh Yeshiva of Telshe Chicago
- Zev Leff, Moshav Mattityahu, Israel
- Moshe Leib Rabinovich
- Avraham Tanzer, Rosh Yeshiva at Yeshiva College of South Africa

== Branches ==
- Telshe Chicago. In 1960 the yeshiva opened a branch in Chicago, Illinois. Within ten years it became independent of the yeshiva in Cleveland.
- Kiryat Ye'arim (Telz-Stone), Israel. In 1977 Mordechai Gifter brought a group of 20 students from Cleveland to open a branch of the yeshiva in Kiryat Ye'arim (Telz-Stone), Israel. In 1979 the Israeli branch closed.
- Yeshiva of Telshe Alumni. In the early 1980s the Yeshiva of Telshe Alumni opened in Riverdale, New York.
- Birchas Chaim. In 2001 Yeshivah Birchas Chaim opened in Lakewood, New Jersey.

== Gallery ==
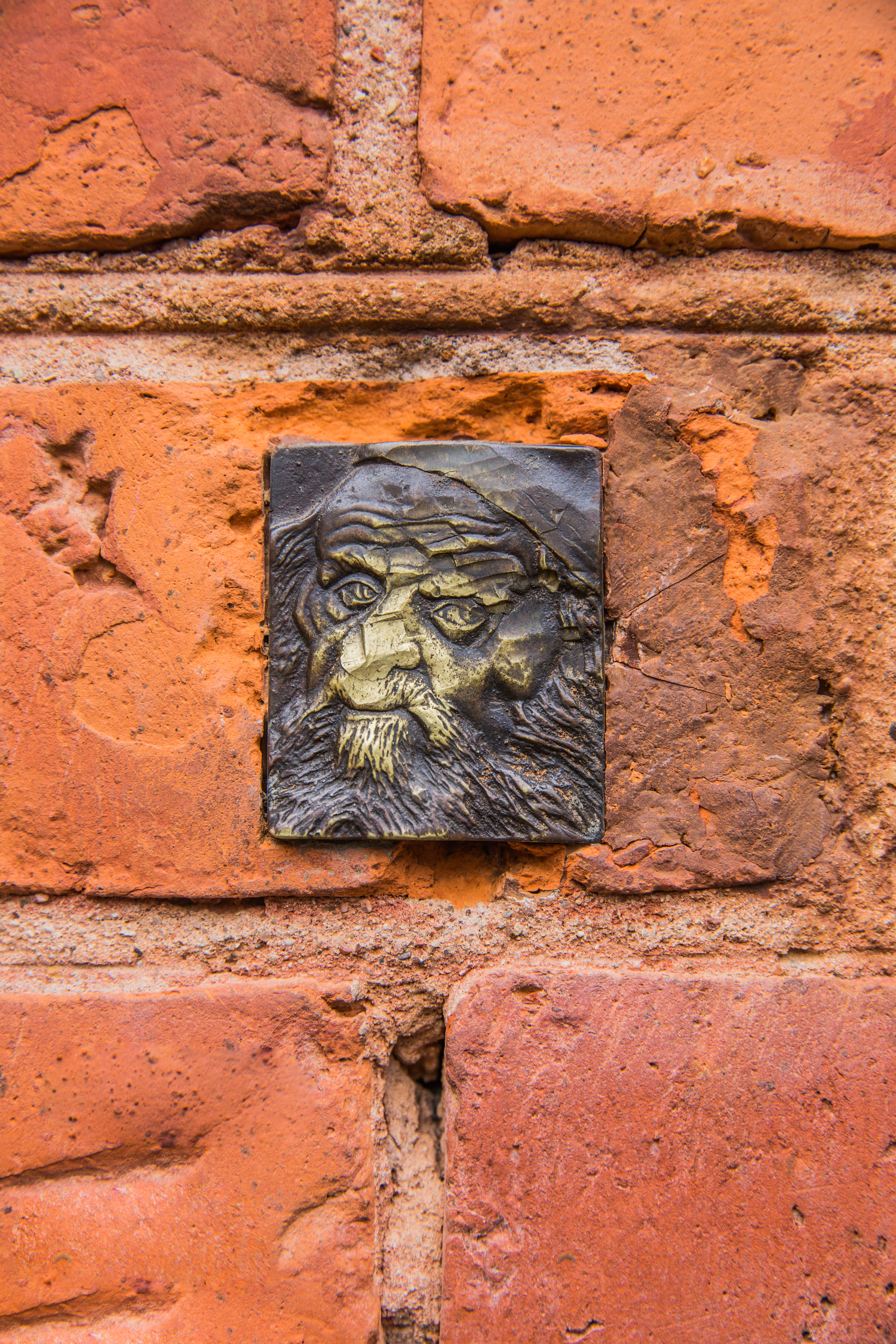
Telšiai Yeshiva art

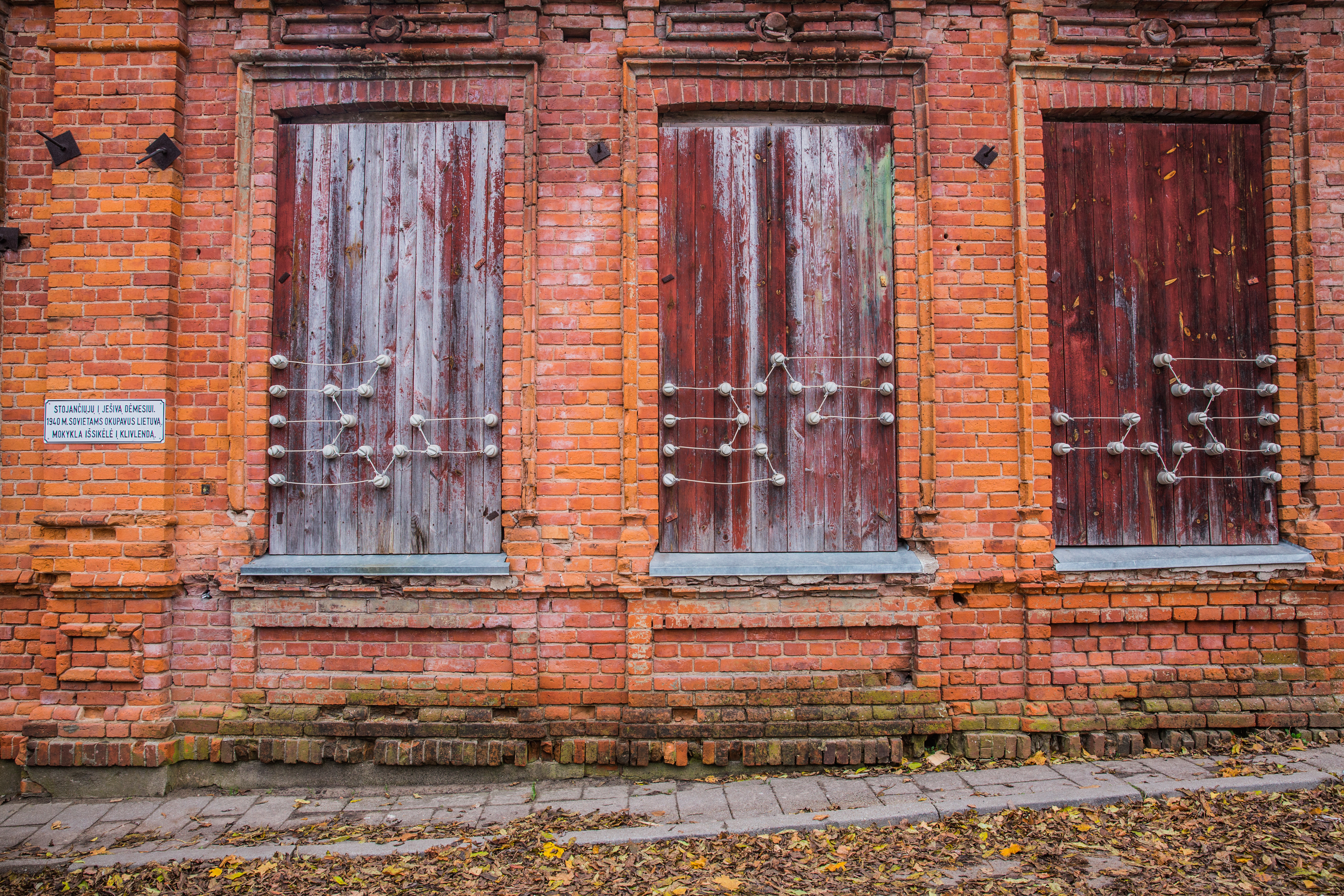
Telšiai Yeshiva building

== See also ==
- Holocaust in Telšiai
