= Hebrew Academy of Cleveland =

School in Cleveland, Ohio

The Hebrew Academy of Cleveland is a private day school in Cleveland, Ohio with over 1,000 students. It provides Judaic and secular education from pre-school through high school. The Hebrew Academy was established in 1943 by the Telshe Yeshiva. In 1947, Yavne, a girls division, was added.

== Divisions ==
- Early Childhood Division
- Girls Elementary Division
- Yeshiva Ketana / Boys Elementary Division

Yeshiva High School / The Oakwood Campus

- Beatrice J. Stone Yavne High School.

== The Living Memorial Project ==
The Living Memorial Project is a project to develop a national curriculum to teach day school students about the Jewish world in Europe before the Holocaust, headed by members of the school faculty. The curriculum has included the "Learning For Letters" Mishnayos Program, dedicating a Sefer Torah in memory of the one million martyred children, a family genealogy project and four published textbooks which delve into pre-war life.

== Notable alumni ==
- Brian Michael Bendis, comic book artist, writer of Marvel's Ultimate Spider-Man.
- Jeff Jacoby (1977), conservative political commentator and Boston Globe columnist.
