= Mattersdorf =

Mattersdorf may refer to:

- a town in the former Kingdom of Hungary, now Mattersburg in Austria
- Kiryat Mattersdorf, a neighborhood in Jerusalem, Israel
