= Bayit =

Bayit or Basis is Hebrew for "house" and might refer to:

== Locations ==
- Bayit VeGan, neighbourhood in Jerusalem
- Bayit Lepletot, orphanage in Jerusalem

== Other ==
- Shalom bayit, Jewish concept of domestic harmony
- Bayit Yehudi, Israeli political party
