= Chaim Pinchas Scheinberg =

Rabbi

Rabbi Chaim Pinchas Scheinberg חיים פנחס שיינברג
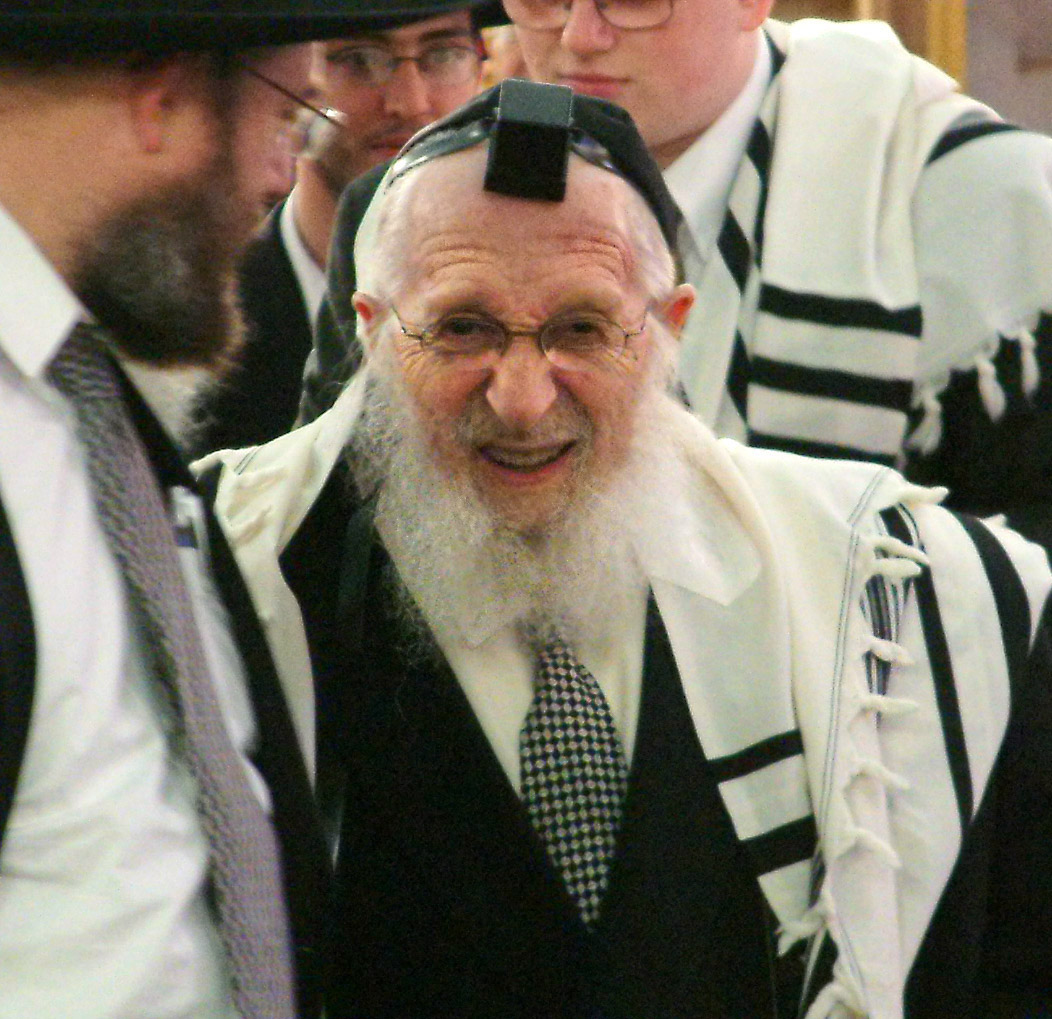
- Rabbi Scheinberg at a brit milah in 2004

Personal life
- Born: Chaim Pinchas Scheinberg; 1 October 1910 Ostrov, Poland
- Died: 20 March 2012 (aged 101) Jerusalem, Israel
- Spouse: Bessie (Basha) Herman (m. 1929; died 2009)
- Children: Fruma Rochel; Rivka; Chana; Zelda Alpert; Simcha
- Parent(s): Yaakov Yitzchak Scheinberg and Yuspa (Yosefa) Tumback
- Education: RIETS; Mir yeshiva (Belarus)

Religious life
- Religion: Judaism
- Denomination: Haredi
- Yeshiva: Torah Ore
- Position: Rosh yeshiva
- Began: 1960
- Residence: Jerusalem, Israel
- Semikhah: RIETS - Rabbi Boruch Ber Leibowitz

Chaim Pinchas Scheinberg (Hebrew: חיים פנחס שיינברג; 1 October 1910 – 20 March 2012) was a Polish-born, American-raised, Israeli Haredi rabbi and rosh yeshiva who, from 1965, made his home in the Kiryat Mattersdorf neighborhood of Jerusalem, Israel. He was the rosh yeshiva of the Torah Ore yeshiva in Kiryat Mattersdorf and Yeshivas Derech Chaim in Brooklyn. He was a posek (decisor of Jewish law), Gadol HaDor, and one of the last living Torah scholars to have been educated in the yeshivas of prewar Europe. He was often consulted on a range of communal and personal halachic issues. He was one of the rabbinic leaders of Kiryat Mattersdorf, together with Rabbi Yisroel Gans and Rabbi Yitzchok Yechiel Ehrenfeld. He was also a member of the Moetzes Gedolei HaTorah of Israel.

== Early years ==
Scheinberg was born in Ostrov, Poland, the second son of Rabbi Yaakov Yitzchok Scheinberg and Yuspa (Yosefa) Tamback. Earlier that year his father had gone to America to avoid conscription into the Polish army and with the outbreak of World War I in 1914, the family lost contact. By 1919, Scheinberg's father had saved enough money to open his own tailor shop and pay for his wife and children to come to America.

At age 9 he moved with his family to an apartment on the Lower East Side. After briefly attending public school, Scheinberg enrolled in the Rabbi Jacob Joseph School where he studied until he was 14, when Yaakov Yosef Herman encouraged him to go to Rabbi Yehuda Levenberg's Beis Medrash LeRabbonim yeshiva in New Haven, Connecticut, where no secular subjects were taught. Herman also wanted Scheinberg to marry his daughter, Bessie, who was then only 12 years old. Scheinberg left the yeshiva at the age of sixteen and a half, having studied the entire Talmud.

At age 17 Scheinberg went to Rabbi Isaac Elchanan Theological Seminary where he studied under rabbis Shlomo Polachek and Moshe Soloveichik.

When Scheinberg was 19 Herman suggested Scheinberg marry his 17-year-old daughter Bessie and the Scheinbergs agreed. Scheinberg received rabbinic ordination before his wedding.

== Mir, Poland ==
Scheinberg and his wife moved to Mir, Belarus (then Poland). where they lived next-door to a yeshiva where Scheinberg studied, and where he was one of the few students who was married and one of the few American students. His wife's brother Nochum Dovid and sister Ruchoma moved to Mir with their spouses. Scheinberg's younger brother, Shmuel, came to study at the Mir at the age of 14; he escaped on one of the last ships leaving Europe before World War II broke out.

The Scheinbergs' first two daughters, Fruma Rochel and Rivka, were born in Poland. When they were expecting their first child, Scheinberg and his wife visited Rabbi Yisrael Meir Kagan (known as the Chofetz Chaim), a leader of Ashkenazi Jewry at the time, to receive his blessing. When Scheinberg asked for an additional blessing since he had come all the way from America to study, the Chofetz Chaim said, "Moses came down all the way from heaven to teach the Jews Torah. What’s the big deal about coming from America to Europe?!” Then he blessed them.

While in Europe, Scheinberg also studied at the Kaminetz yeshiva and received rabbinic ordination.

== New York ==
In 1935 the Scheinbergs returned to America because his American citizenship would have expired after more than five years abroad. Soon after his return, Scheinberg was offered the position of mashgiach ruchani (spiritual supervisor) of the Yeshiva Chofetz Chaim in Queens founded by Rabbi Dovid Leibowitz, a position he held for 25 years before leaving to open his own yeshiva, Torah Ore. During this time, Scheinberg also became the rabbi of Congregation Bakash Shalom Anshei Ostrov on the Lower East Side, where he gave Torah lectures to working men.

The Scheinbergs had two more daughters, Chana and Zelda, and a son, Simcha, in New York. Zelda was married to Rabbi Nisson Alpert. They also raised Rivky Kaufman, one of the seven orphans of Bessie's sister Freida, after the latter's sudden death in 1938.

With the help of his brother Shmuel and his son-in-law, Rabbi Chaim Dov Altusky (Fruma Rochel's husband), Scheinberg opened the Torah Ore yeshiva in Bensonhurst, Brooklyn in 1960. The yeshiva started with six students and went on to enroll many local Sephardi boys.

== Move to Israel ==
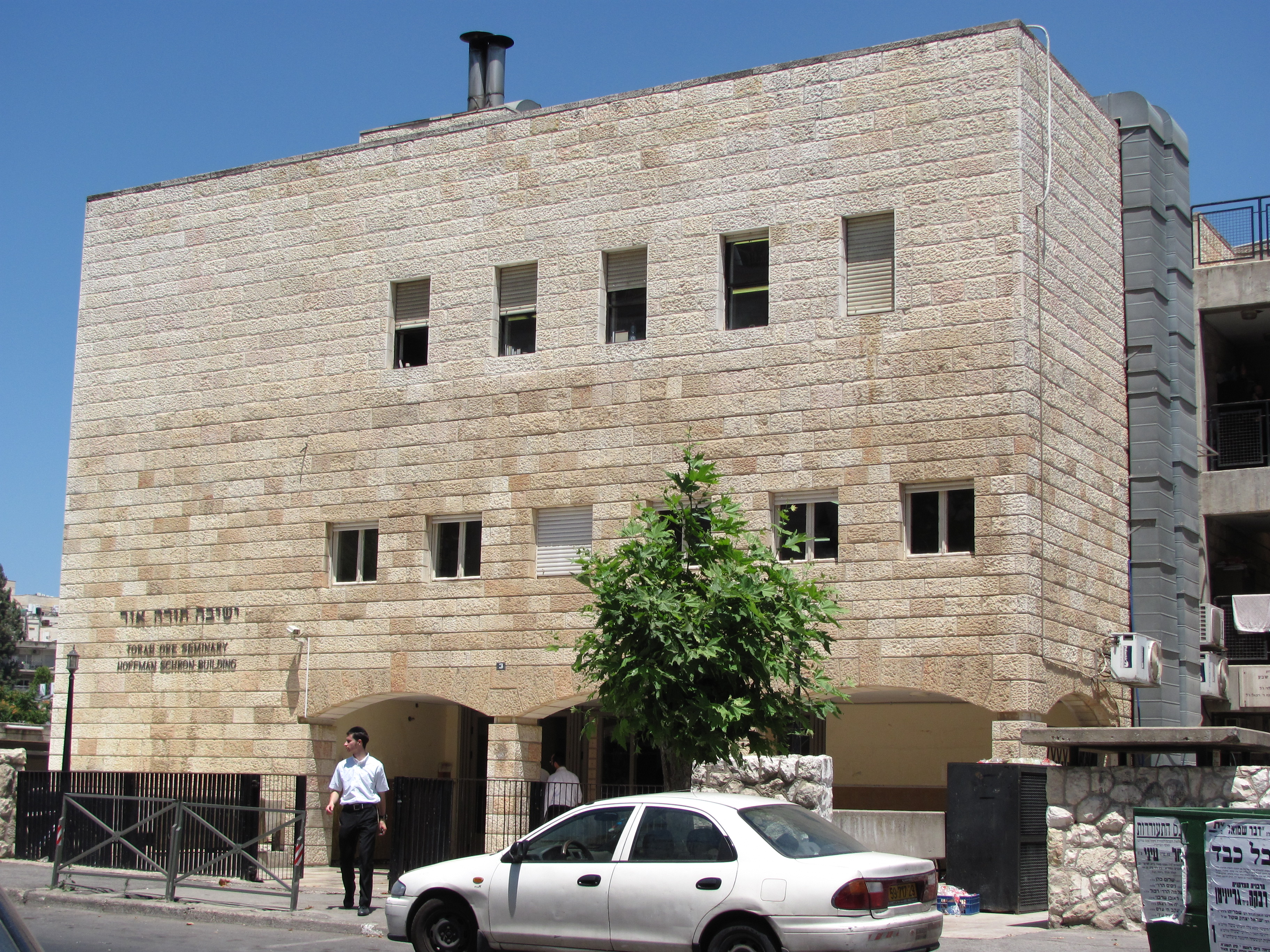
Torah Ore yeshiva in Kiryat Mattersdorf, Jerusalem.

In 1963 Bessie's sister Ruchoma visited their father in Israel and toured a planned Haredi housing development in northern Jerusalem called Kiryat Mattersdorf, which was founded by Rabbi Shmuel Ehrenfeld, the Mattersdorfer Rav, who was Ruchoma's neighbor in New York. Upon her return, Ruchoma told Bessie about her desire to buy an apartment there, and Bessie also expressed interest in buying an apartment. Though Scheinberg was skeptical about relocating his family and his American yeshiva to Israel, he made a pilot trip to tour the development and decided that it could work. Ehrenfeld's son, Rabbi Akiva Ehrenfeld, who was his representative in supervising the construction and sale of the apartments, encouraged Scheinberg to relocate his yeshiva to Jerusalem from Bensonhurst, Brooklyn by offering attractive terms for apartments and land for the yeshiva.

The Scheinbergs, their daughter Fruma Rochel and her family, their son Simcha and his family, and over 20 of Scheinberg's students moved into their new homes in May 1965. Rabbi Asa Wittow, a married student who had learned under Scheinberg since 1960 and who also served as his driver in New York, made aliyah with him and moved into the same apartment building.

Scheinberg first established the Torah Ore yeshiva in the Diskin Orphanage building in Jerusalem's Givat Shaul neighborhood. When the Six-Day War broke out in June 1967 and many American tourists headed home, Scheinberg encouraged his students to stay, and none of the American students at Torah Ore left the yeshiva. During the war, Scheinberg showed his complete devotion to his students, giving them encouragement and sleeping together with them in the bomb shelter.

After the war, Scheinberg undertook plans to build a permanent home for his yeshiva. Torah Ore moved into its present building in Kiryat Mattersdorf in 1971. As of 2011, the yeshiva enrolls nearly 800 students, including over 500 kollel students.

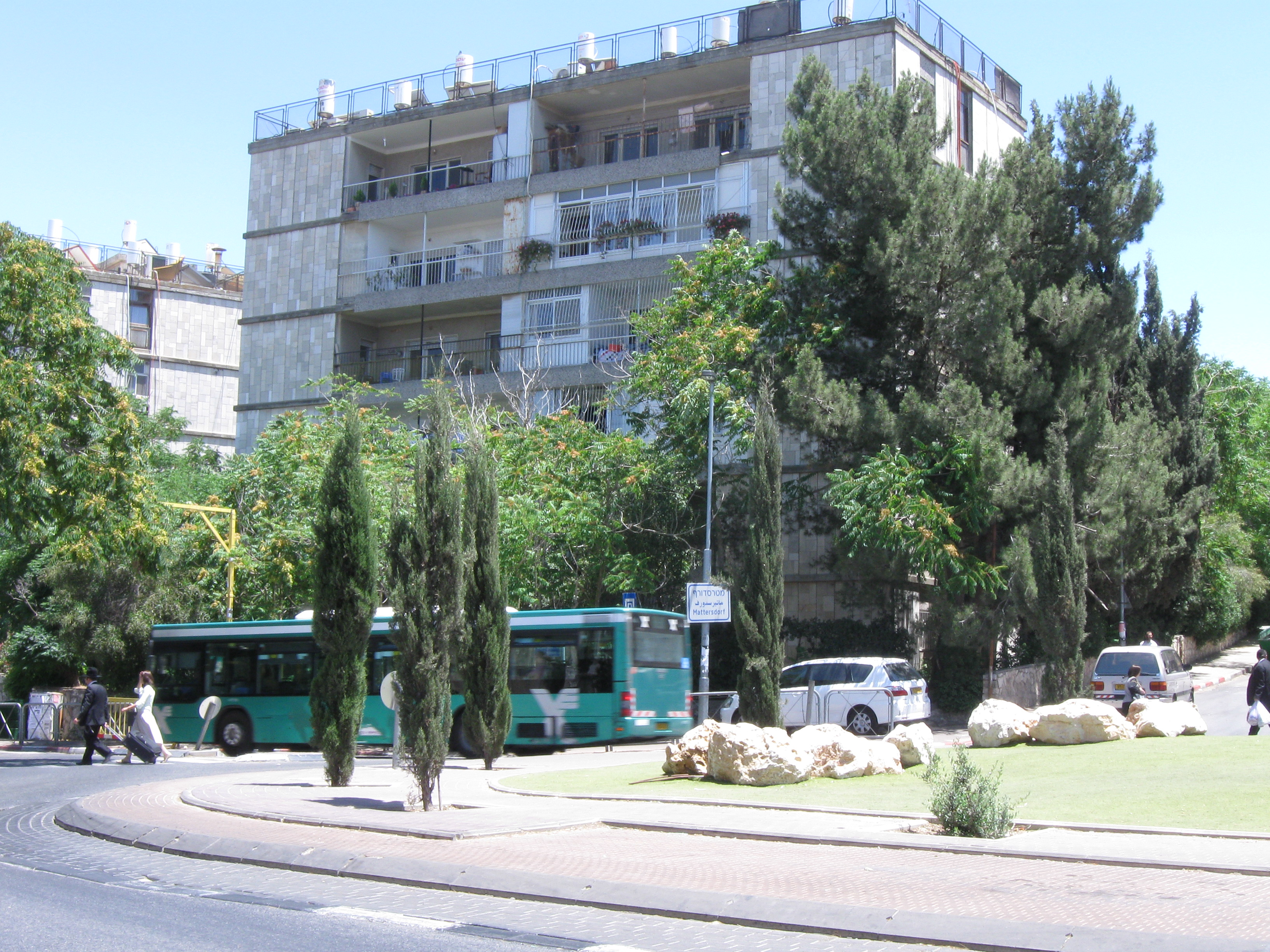
The Scheinbergs' apartment building at the western entrance to Kiryat Mattersdorf; their apartment is at top left.

Bessie was a key partner in her husband's work, supporting him and his students and opening her home to the many people who sought her husband's counsel. They installed a telephone in their bedroom so callers could reach him at any hour. On Simchat Torah, when hundreds of singing and dancing students escorted Scheinberg home from the yeshiva after the services, she would look on from their sixth-floor apartment. When he came upstairs, he would say to her, "Did you see that? Did you see all those students singing and dancing? That was all because of you. It's all yours, Basha". Similarly, when she came into the yeshiva, he would give up his seat for her, saying, "Basha, this seat belongs to you".

Scheinberg became a central address for Americans in Israel seeking guidance for raising children, finding a neighborhood to live in, finding spouses, and coping with medical issues, as well as regular halachic questions. His approbation was sought for many Hebrew- and English-language halacha books for adults and children. The English sefer Rigshei Lev: Women and tefillah – perspectives, laws and customs cites his halachic opinions extensively. In 2000, his neighborhood lectures to English-speaking women were compiled in a book titled Heart to Heart Talks, published by ArtScroll.

== Later life ==
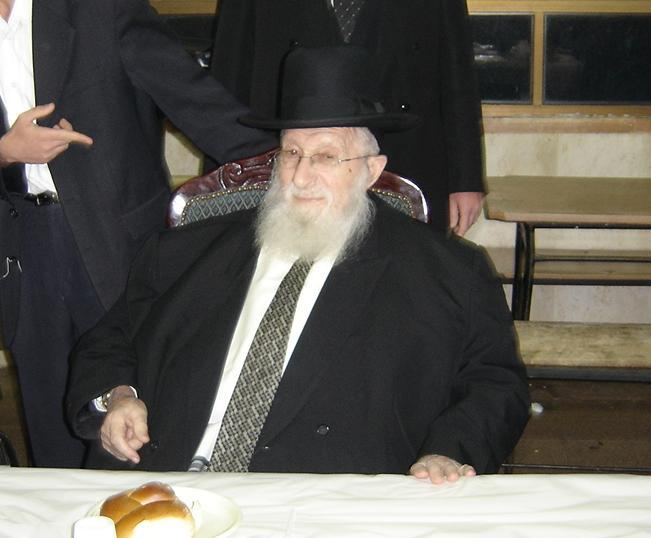
Scheinberg in 2010.

His wife died on 21 October 2009 at the age of 96 after over 79 years of marriage.

Scheinberg died in the Shaare Zedek Medical Center of Jerusalem at the age of 101 on 20 March 2012 (27 Adar 5772) after a brief illness. He had an inflammation in the kidneys and an infection in his vascular system. An estimated 70,000 people attended his funeral, which began at the Torah Ore yeshiva and proceeded to the Mount of Olives. His only son, Rabbi Simcha Scheinberg, succeeded him as rosh yeshiva of Torah Ore.

== Works ==
- Derech Emunah U-Bitachon (The Way of Faith and Trust)
- Tabaas HaChoshen (see here) – a comprehensive, multi-volume explanation of the Ketzot Hachoshen, first published in 1951
- Mishmeres Chaim
- Shiurei Rebbe Chaim Pinchas – shiurim and new Torah thoughts on numerous Talmudic tractates, edited by Rabbi Mordechai Levine, Toras Chaim: The Association for the Dissemination of Torah, 2005
- Netivot Chaim (translated into English as The Torah Way of Life by Jerusalem Publications: Vol. 1: Bereishis (2004), ISBN 0-9743911-9-0; Vol. 2: Shemos (2005); Vol. 4: Bamidbar (2007).
- Heart to Heart Talks: Rabbi Chaim Pinchas Scheinberg lectures to women. Mesorah Publications. 2000. ISBN 1-57819-503-9.
- Imrei Chaim

== Bibliography ==
- Abramov, Rabbi Yirmiyohu; Abramov, Tehilla (1994). Two Halves of a Whole: Torah guidelines for marriage. Targum Press. ISBN 1-56871-068-2.
- Apelbaum, Shiffy (2000). Moshe Mendel the Mitzva Maven and the Wonderful World of Berachos. Feldheim Publishers. ISBN 1-58330-453-3.
- Chizkayah, Rabbi Michael (2005). The Halachic Guide to Medical Practice on Shabbos: For physicians, caregivers, and the home. Targum Press. ISBN 1-56871-359-2.
- Finkelstein, Rabbi Moshe, ed. (2000). Heart to Heart Talks: Rabbi Chaim Pinchas Scheinberg lectures to women. Mesorah Publications. ISBN 1-57819-503-9.
- Greenwald, Rabbi Ze'ev (2001). You Don't Say: A children's guide to the halachos of speech. Feldheim Publishers. ISBN 1-58330-476-2.
- Nissel, Menachem (2001). Rigshei Lev: Women and tefillah – perspectives, laws and customs. Targum Press. ISBN 1-56871-156-5.
- Shain, Ruchoma (1984). All For The Boss: An affectionate family chronicle of Reb Yaakov Yosef Herman, a Torah pioneer in America. Jerusalem/New York: Feldheim Publishers. ISBN 0-87306-346-5.
- Travis, Rabbi Daniel Yaakov (2006). Shabbos, Tasting Eternity: The mitzvos of enjoying and honoring Shabbos. Hamodia Publishers. ISBN 965-555-159-8.
- Wikler, Dr. Meir (1997). Einei Hashem: Contemporary stories of Divine Providence in Eretz Yisrael. Feldheim Publishers. ISBN 0-87306-852-1.
