= Kiryat Itri =

Neighborhood of Jerusalem, Israel

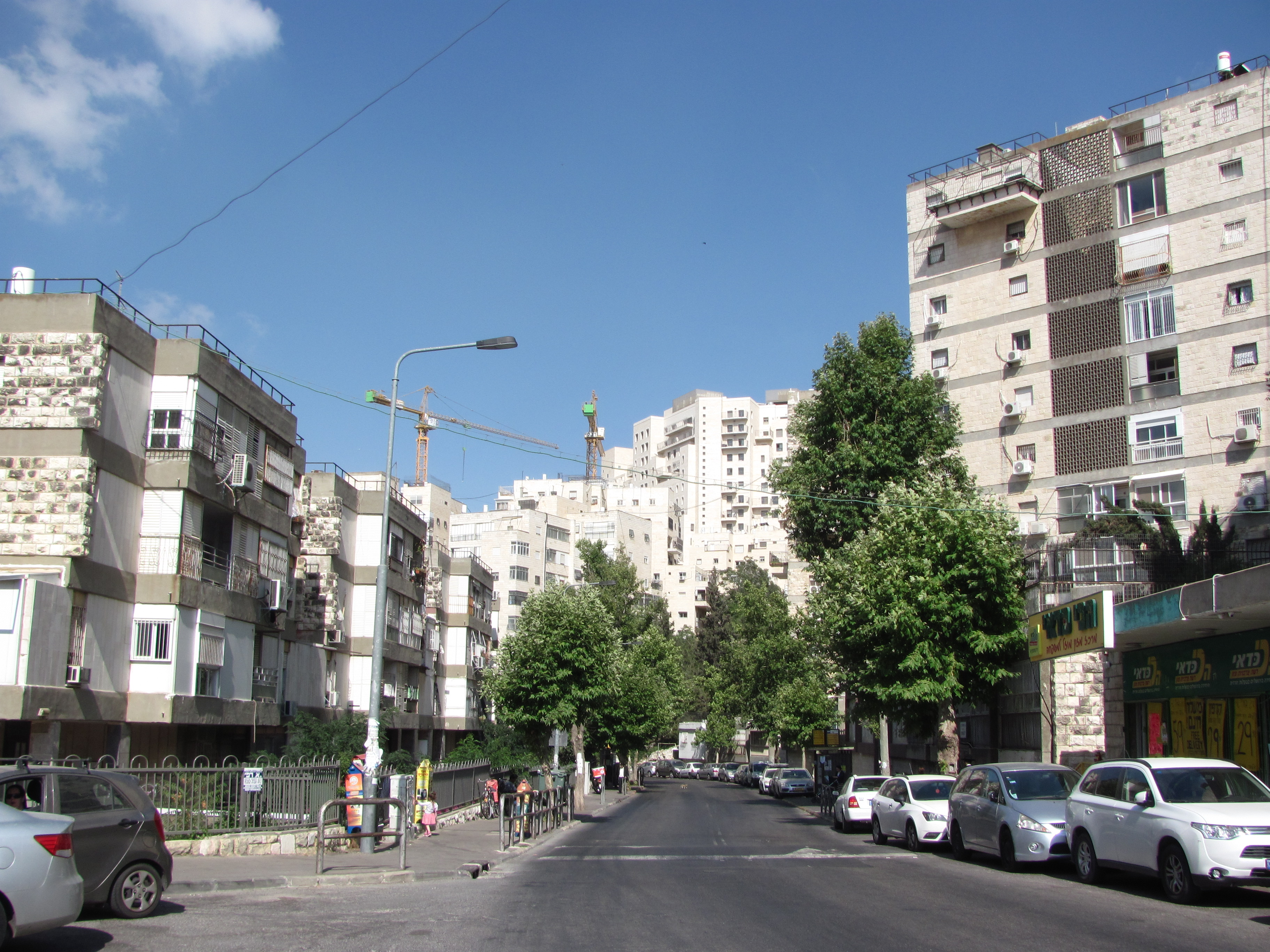
Kiryat Itri

Kiryat Itri (Hebrew: קריית איתרי) is a Haredi neighborhood in Jerusalem. It is located on the northern edge of the mountain plateau on which central Jerusalem lies.

The neighborhood was established in the late 1960s by Rabbi Mordechai Elefant, in cooperation with the Jewish Agency for Israel, to encourage American Jewish immigration to Israel. The small neighborhood is usually associated with the larger, adjoining neighborhoods of Kiryat Mattersdorf to the west or Unsdorf to the northeast.

== History ==
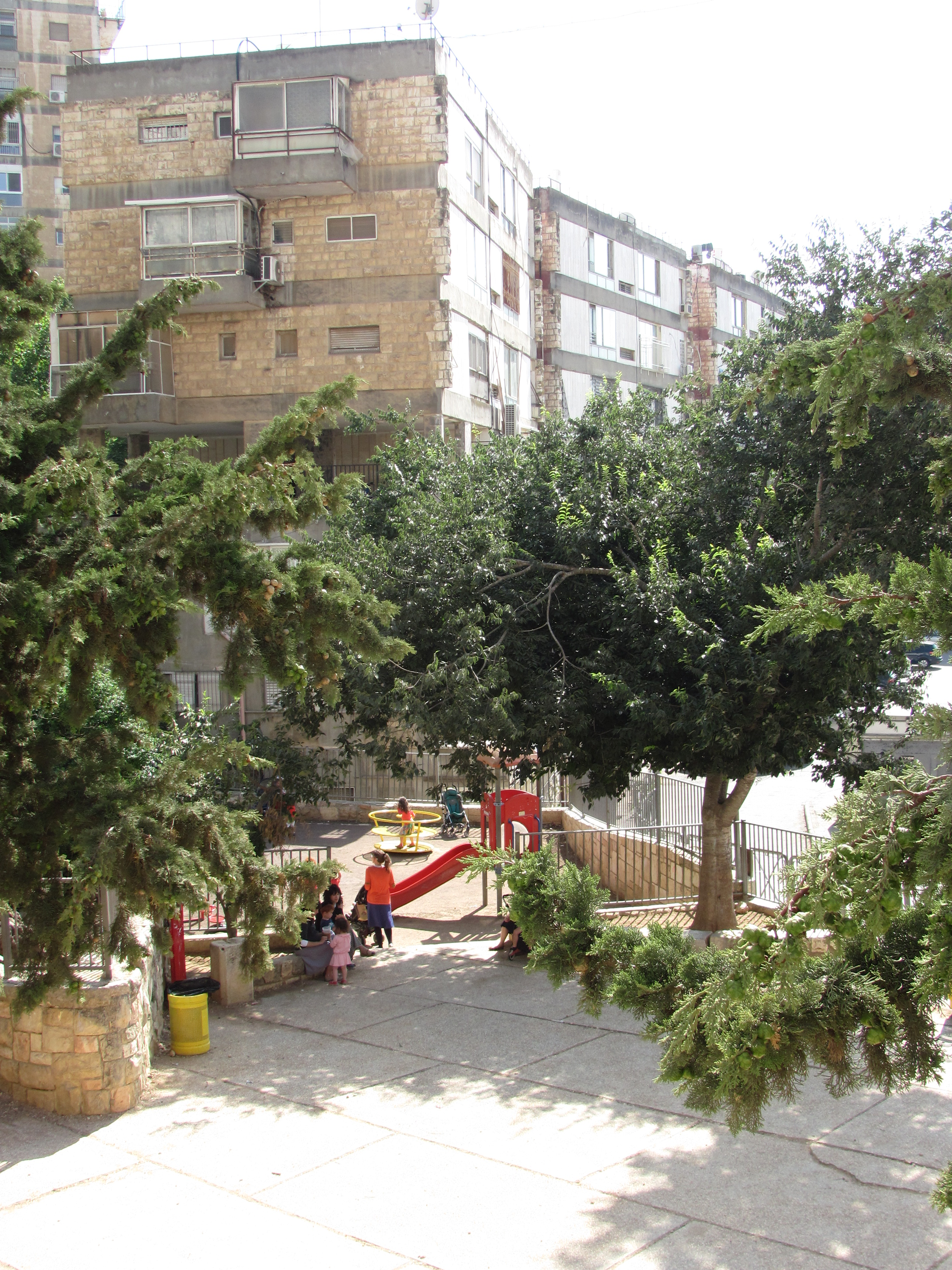
Small playground beside buildings of Kiryat Itri

Kiryat Itri was established in 1967 by the Israel Torah Research Institute (ITRI) of New York City, under the leadership of Rabbi Mordechai Elefant, institute dean. Elefant established Yeshivas Itri in the southeast of the city the following year. The housing development was undertaken in co-operation with the Jewish Agency for Israel, to encourage American Jewish immigration to Israel. Construction costs exceeded IL30 million (US$7.5 million, or $72,400,000 in current dollar terms).

The neighborhood was planned along the northern edge of the mountain plateau on which central Jerusalem lies, adjacent to the newly built neighborhood of Kiryat Mattersdorf. Its viability was threatened before construction even began, when, in the spring of 1967, it was found that the site abutted a rock quarry to the south in Romema, which bombarded the area with dust and noise from explosions. Elefant and the owners of the quarry appeared before a district planning committee to discuss the relocation of the quarry.

Kiryat Itri was planned for 250 families. Three high-rise apartment buildings were erected on the south side of the street, and five low-rise apartment buildings on the north side. The flats were small by American standards. A supermarket and postal agency occupy the ground floor of 14 Sorotzkin, the westernmost building. The main street, Rechov Sorotzkin, is named after Rabbi Zalman Sorotzkin.

The first residents, comprising 85 individuals and 65 families, arrived in Israel from the United States in August 1968. Singles and young people were temporarily lodged in a former British hospital in Beit Safafa and in the Orient House hotel to await completion of their apartments, while families were lodged in rented homes. Occupancy began in 1969.

== Landmarks ==
=== Synagogues ===
- B'tzeil HaChachma
- Ohel David V'Elimelech Maimon
- Ohel Sarah-Leah

=== Lakewood Yeshiva–Jerusalem ===
The Israel branch of the Lakewood Yeshiva was first founded in Kiryat Itri in the 1980s. In 2004, the yeshiva moved to its own building in the Ramot neighborhood.

== Notable residents ==
Notable residents of Kiryat Itri include Rabbi Yitzchok Ezrachi, a rosh yeshiva of the Mir yeshiva; famous Jewish radical Rabbi Meir Kahane (1932–1990); Rabbi Nathan Kamenetsky, an instructor at Yeshivas Itri; and Rabbi Naftali HaKohen Rot, Rav of the Chabad community of Kiryat Mattersdorf–Itri.

Rabbi Eliyahu Abba Shaul, son of Rabbi Ben Zion Abba Shaul, represented Kiryat Mattersdorf, Kiryat Itri, and Kiryat Unsdorf on the Jerusalem Religious Council.
