= Orient House =

Building in East Jerusalem

Coordinates: 31°47′20.19″N 35°13′48.31″E

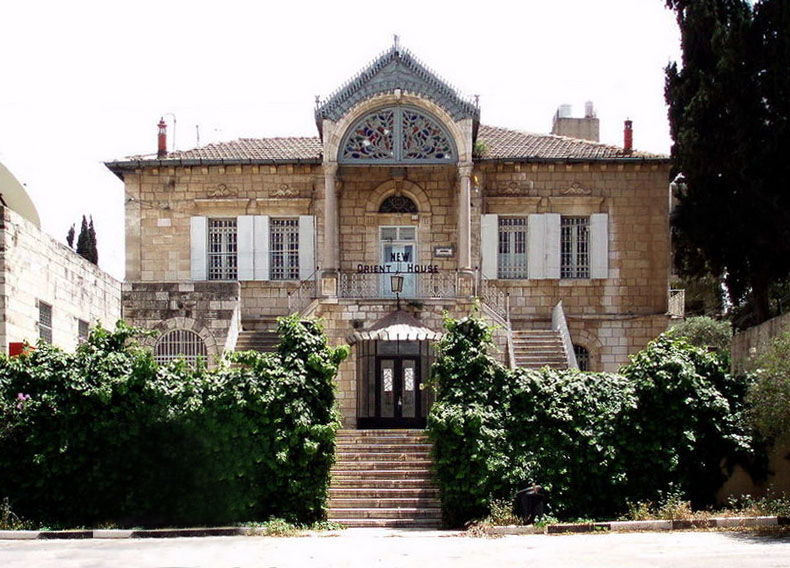
Orient House (former PLO headquarters in Jerusalem)

Orient House (Arabic: بيت الشرق, romanized: Bayt ash-Sharq; Hebrew: אוריינט האוס, romanized: Oriyent Ha'us) is a building located in Jerusalem that served as the headquarters of the Palestine Liberation Organization (PLO) in the 1980s and 1990s.

Built in 1897 by Ismail Musa Al-Husseini, it has been owned by the Al-Husseini family since. Originally intended to serve as a family residence, it was at times vacated to host important guests, such as Kaiser Wilhelm II of Germany in 1898 and Emperor Haile Selassie of Ethiopia in 1936.

== History ==
=== 1948 War and Jordanian rule ===
During the 1948 Arab–Israeli War, Orient House remained east of the ceasefire line, in the area controlled by Jordan. Between 1948–1950, the headquarters of the United Nations Relief and Works Agency for Palestine Refugees in the Near East (UNRWA) was located there and two years later, its owner turned it into a luxury hotel called "The New Orient House".

=== Israeli occupation ===
Following the 1967 Six-Day War and the capture of East Jerusalem by Israel, the hotel was closed and the building was mostly neglected. Many of the first residents of the northern Jerusalem neighborhood of Kiryat Itri, who arrived from the United States in 1968 before their flats were ready, were temporarily lodged in the Orient House.

In 1983, the Arab Scientific Association, a PLO-affiliated organization led by Faisal Husseini, rented a part of the house. In 1988, Israel closed the House and banned PLO activity in it. It was renewed four years later in 1992. It was then rented and renovated by Husseini. In an exchange of letters preceding the 1993 Oslo Accords, Israel promised that it would not violate the right of the House to continue to operate freely.

During his first tenure as Prime Minister of Israel, Benjamin Netanyahu "tried and failed to have Orient House shut down, amid warning from the international community that such a step would be regarded very negatively."

When Ehud Olmert was serving in his post as Mayor of Jerusalem, he led efforts to protest against the way Orient House was functioning, refusing to meet with Husseini and demanding that Orient House pay US$300,000 in municipal taxes. Husseini refused the request, stating that Orient House, as a diplomatic institution, was exempt. Husseini died a few years later in May 2001.

During the Second Intifada in August 2001, the then Israeli prime minister Ariel Sharon determined that with the expectation of a massive Israeli response, the conditions were as favorable as they would ever be for Israel to undertake the forcible closure of Orient House. Two days after the Sbarro restaurant suicide bombing, the Israeli cabinet voted to close the Orient House, and the building was raided by Israeli security forces. Items confiscated by Israeli authorities included personal belongings, confidential information relating to the Jerusalem issue, documents referring to the Madrid Conference of 1991 and the Arab Studies Society photography collection. The personal books and documents of Faisal Husseini were summarily impounded. Other Palestinian institutions in Jerusalem, such as the Governor's House and the headquarters of Force 17 were shut down and raided in the same operation.

In January 2010, at a meeting of the Quartet on the Middle East, representatives from the European Union and Russia suggested reopening Orient House and other Palestinian institutions in East Jerusalem as a way of bringing the Palestinian Authority back to the negotiating table. The suggestion was made after George Mitchell told those at the meeting that Palestinian representatives had insisted that they would not return to negotiations until Israel halted all settlement activity in the eastern half of the city.

== Cultural references ==
The jazz musician Gilad Atzmon has named his band The Orient House Ensemble after this building.

== Bibliography ==
- Joanne Maher (ed.), The Middle East and North Africa 2003 (49th, illustrated ed.), Europa Publishing/Routledge (Taylor & Francis), ISBN 9781857431322 (1st ed. 2002 by Routledge)
- Friedland, Roger; Hecht, Richard D. (1996), To rule Jerusalem (Illustrated ed.), Cambridge University Press, ISBN 9780521440462
