= Yehuda Levenberg =

R Yehuda Heschel Levenberg 1884-1938 (54 years)

Rabbi Yehuda Heschel HaLevi Levenberg (December 18, 1884 – January 15, 1938) (יהודה העשל לעווענבערג) was a well-known pioneer in the implanting of the European Jewish community on the shores of America. Rabbi Levenberg moved to Cleveland and was buried in New Haven, Connecticut. His Mechutan (His son married Moshe Shatskesz daughter) Moshe Shatzkes|

== Biography ==
In his youth, Rabbi Levenberg studied under Rabbi Zalman Sender Kahana-Shapira in the Maltch yeshiva and later spent much time in the Slabodka yeshiva. He immigrated to America in the summer of 1910 and soon afterwards was appointed as Chief Rabbi of Jersey City, New Jersey. In 1915, he was among the most prominent rabbis in America who spoke at the dedication of the merged Etz Chaim yeshiva and RIETS. In 1917, he accepted a rabbinical position in New Haven, Connecticut and was appointed as Chief Rabbi there in 1920. In New Haven, he was known for his great oratory skill in inspiring the members of his congregation. He established a yeshiva there in 1923 which did not offer any secular studies as only Torah study was on the curriculum. The yeshiva eventually became the most prestigious in America and at different times had on its faculty the likes of Rabbi Moshe Feinstein, Rabbi Yaakov Ruderman, and Samuel Belkin.

In 1930, after accepting a position as the community Rabbi of Cleveland, Ohio, Rabbi Levenberg moved his Yeshiva to Cleveland. Although, it never reached the same position in prestige at its newer location.

Amongst other famous personalities, Rabbi Chaim Pinchas Scheinberg studied in Rabbi Yehuda Levenberg's yeshiva.

In addition to his academic and communal contributions, Rabbi Levenberg also aided in the reformation of Shechita practices in America.

Rabbi Levenberg's son, Tzvi Levenberg, married Chana, a daughter of Rabbi Moshe Shatzkes (Chana died on 21 March 2013 / Nissan 10, 5773). He was one of the Rosh Yeshivas of Yeshiva Rabbi Chaim Berlin. Rabbi Tzvi Levenberg died on 13 Shvat 5777. His son, named Rabbi Yehuda Levenberg (named for his grandfather), is the author of Imrei Chayn (אמרי חן) and resides in Lakewood, NJ. Rabbi Yehuda Heschel's other son, Samuel Levenberg was a Rabbi in New Haven for many years and subsequently Wheeling, WV, Kalamazoo, MI and retired from the pulpit outside Buffalo, NY. Rabbi Levenberg moved to Cleveland and was buried in New Haven, Connecticut.

== Sources and External Links ==
- Biography of Rabbi Levenberg (written by his son-in-law in Yiddish)
- Short biography of Rabbi Levenberg in Doros HaAcharonim, 1914, pp. 213-216 (Rabbi Benzion Eisenstadt)
- Short biography of Rabbi Levenberg in Orthodox Judaism in America, Rabbi Moshe Sherman, 1996, pp. 131-133
- The world of the Yeshiva: an intimate portrait of Orthodox Jewry
- Rabbi Yehuda Heschel Levenberg's tombstone
