= Kiryat Unsdorf =

Neighborhood in Jerusalem

Coordinates: 31.794923°N 35.204358°E

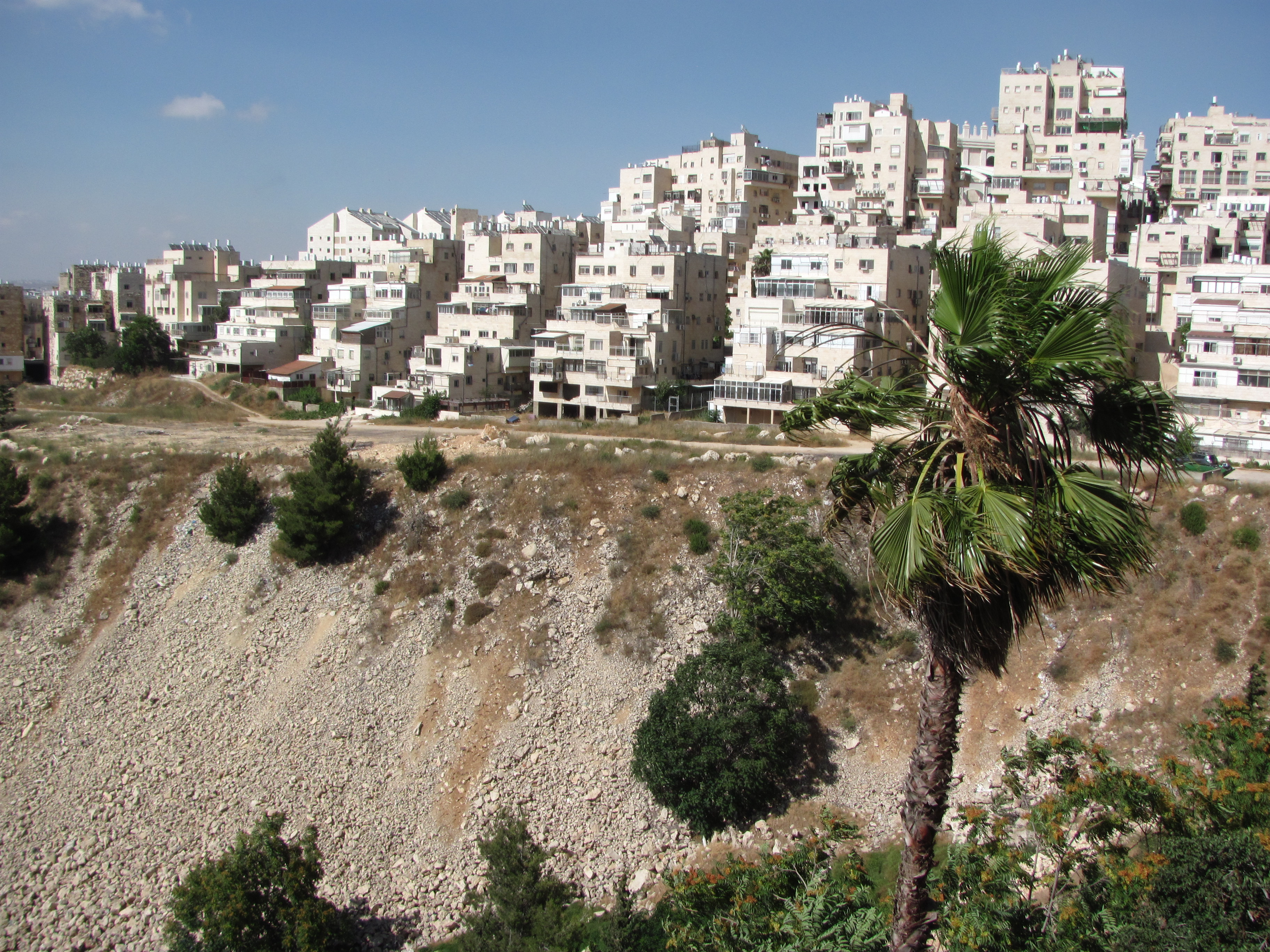
View of the Unsdorf neighborhood and wadi below

Kiryat Unsdorf (Hebrew: קריית אונסדורף), also known as Sorotzkin, after its main street, is a Haredi Jewish neighborhood in Jerusalem. It is located along the northern edge of the mountain plateau on which central Jerusalem lies. Constructed between 1970 and 1985, Unsdorf is home to several landmark educational centers. A large percentage of residents are American or British-born.

== Name ==
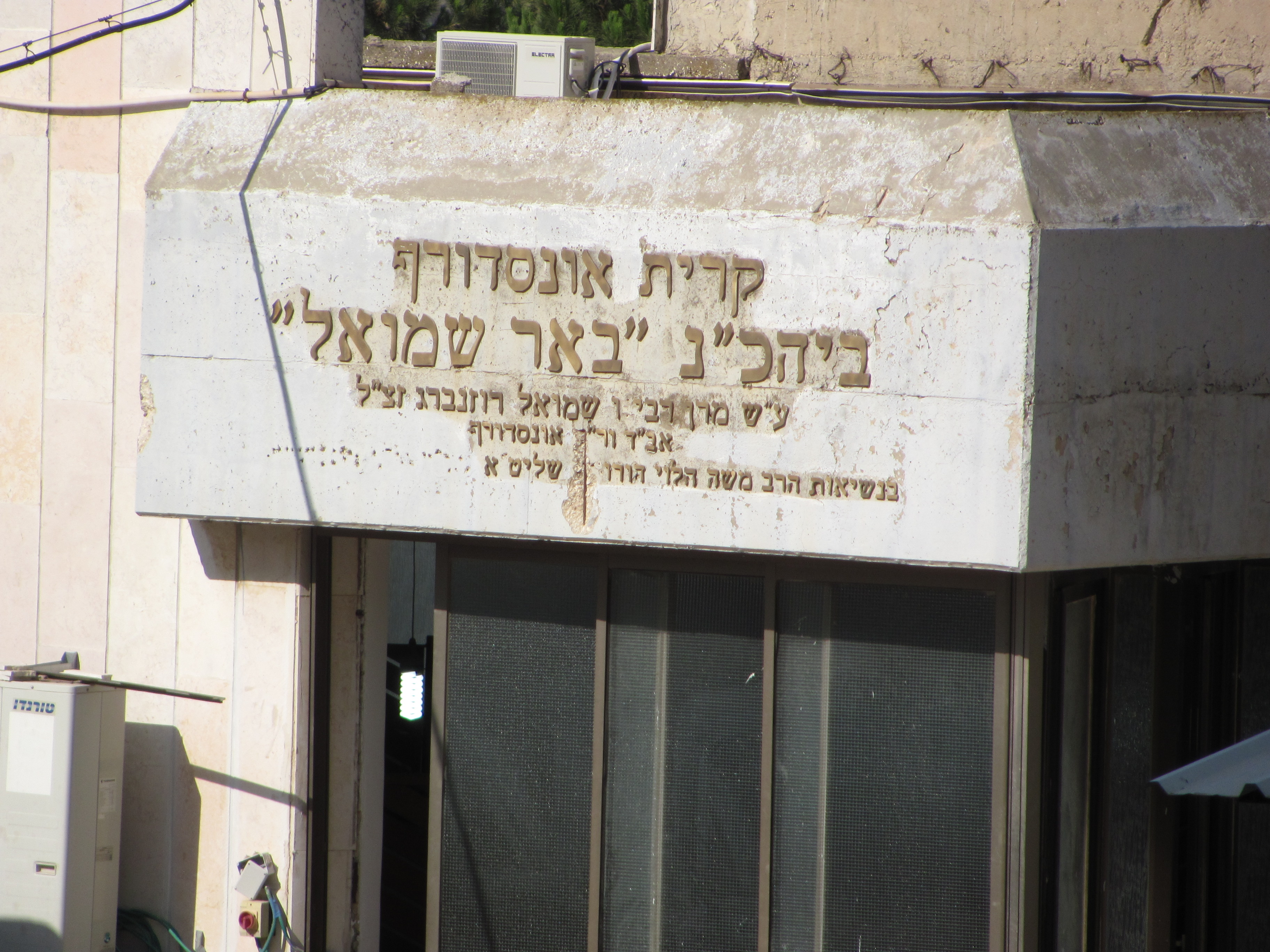
Entrance of Be'er Shmuel Synagogue, dedicated to the Unsdorfer Rav, Rabbi Shmuel Rosenberg

Unsdorf is named in memory of the Slovak town of Huncovce (Yiddish: Unsdorf), whose Jewish community was destroyed during the Holocaust. The main synagogue, Be'er Shmuel, is named after the Unsdorfer Rav, Rabbi Shmuel Rosenberg (1842-1919), a disciple of the Ksav Sofer and author of the work Be'er Shmuel.

== Location ==
Situated along the northern edge of the mountain plateau on which central Jerusalem lies, Unsdorf is one of a series of Haredi neighborhoods extending in a continuous line from the western entrance of Jerusalem to Jaffa Gate. Unsdorf is bordered by Kiryat Sanz to the east, Kiryat Belz to the south, and Kiryat Itri to the southwest. The main thoroughfare is Sorotzkin Street, named after Rabbi Zalman Sorotzkin. A small side street off Sorotzkin is Rechov Menachem Meishiv, named after the Torah work by Rabbi Menachem Sofer, a rabbinical leader in pre-war Romania and who was murdered in the Holocaust.

== History ==
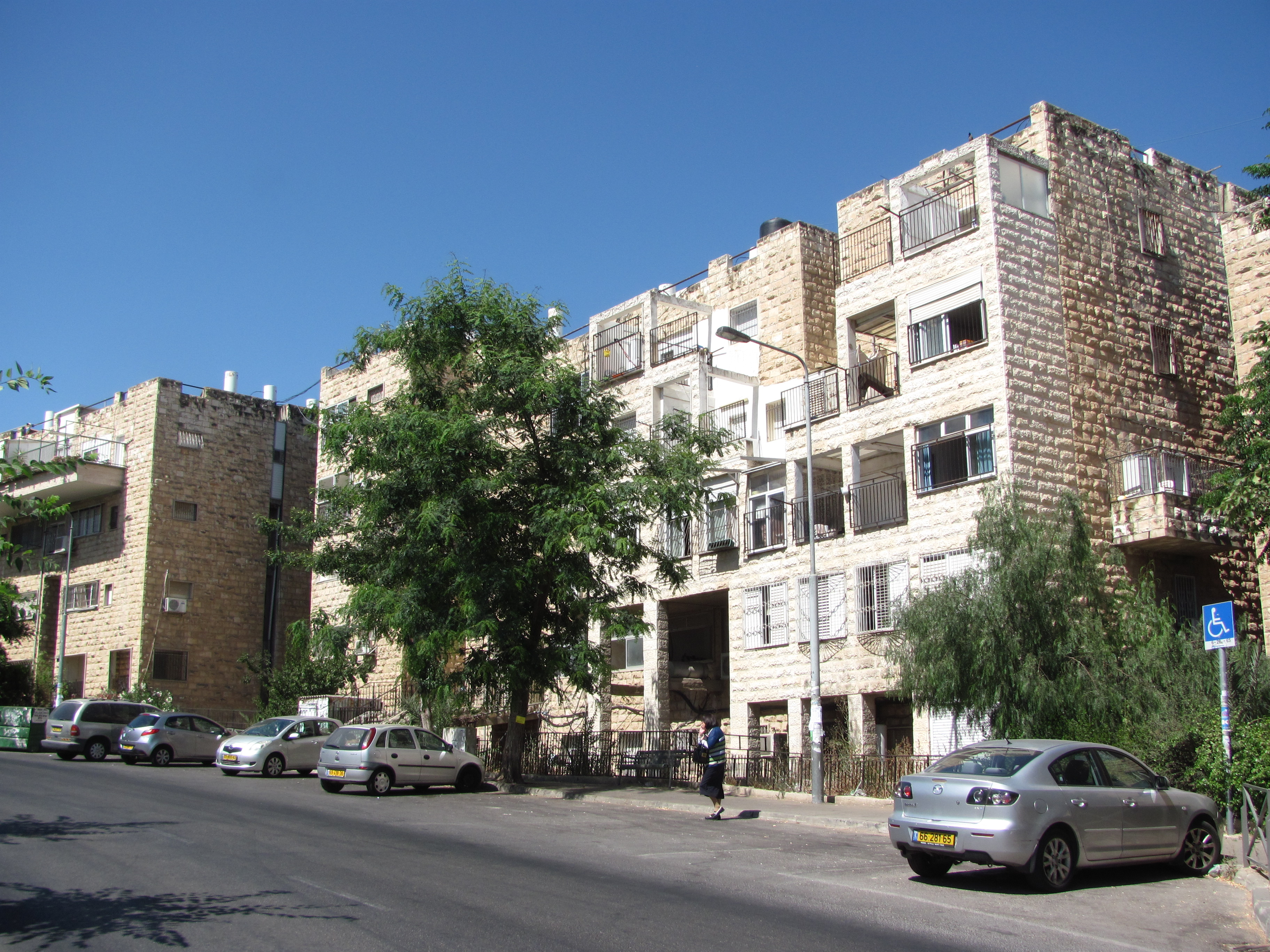
Original apartment buildings with extensions

The land for the neighborhood was purchased by Rabbi Moshe Halevi Horowitz, the son of the Unsdorfer-Frankfurter Rav, Rabbi Yonah Tzvi Halevi Horowitz. He engaged Rabbi Akiva Ehrenfeld, who established the nearby community of Kiryat Mattersdorf, to assist with planning and construction. The initial plan called for construction of 250 apartment units and public institutions. Construction took place from 1970 to 1985. The residential buildings averaged six stories in height. Further expansion of apartments, including the addition of new wings, was undertaken in the 2000s. Like Kiryat Mattersdorf, Unsdorf has a lack of urban open space.

In the 2000s, Unsdorf saw an influx of newly-wed Haredi couples from the United States and Europe. The Unsdorf Renter's Union was formed at this time, to control excessive rent hikes and halt the practice of inflating rental prices for new tenants. An English-speaking N'shei (women's social group) called N'shei Sorotzkin organizes shiurim (Torah lectures) and social evenings.

The majority of residents identify with the Litvish style of life and Torah study. A large percentage of residents are American-born. The foreign-born population increases noticeably over the Sukkot holiday when tourists rent flats in the locale, which is an hour's walk from the Western Wall.

== Educational institutions ==
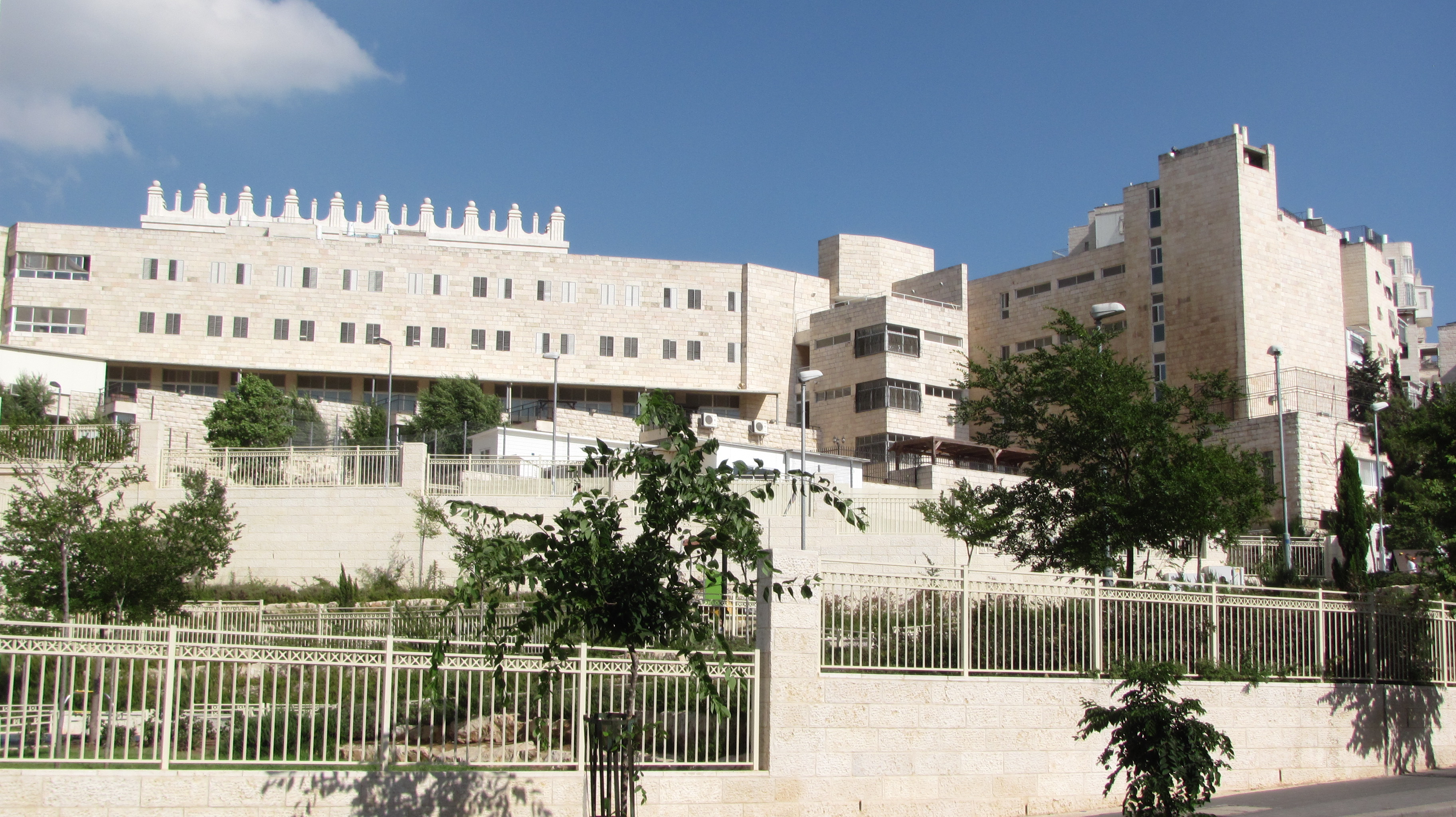
Beth Jacob Jerusalem seminary (crenelated roof of Belz Great Synagogue in background)

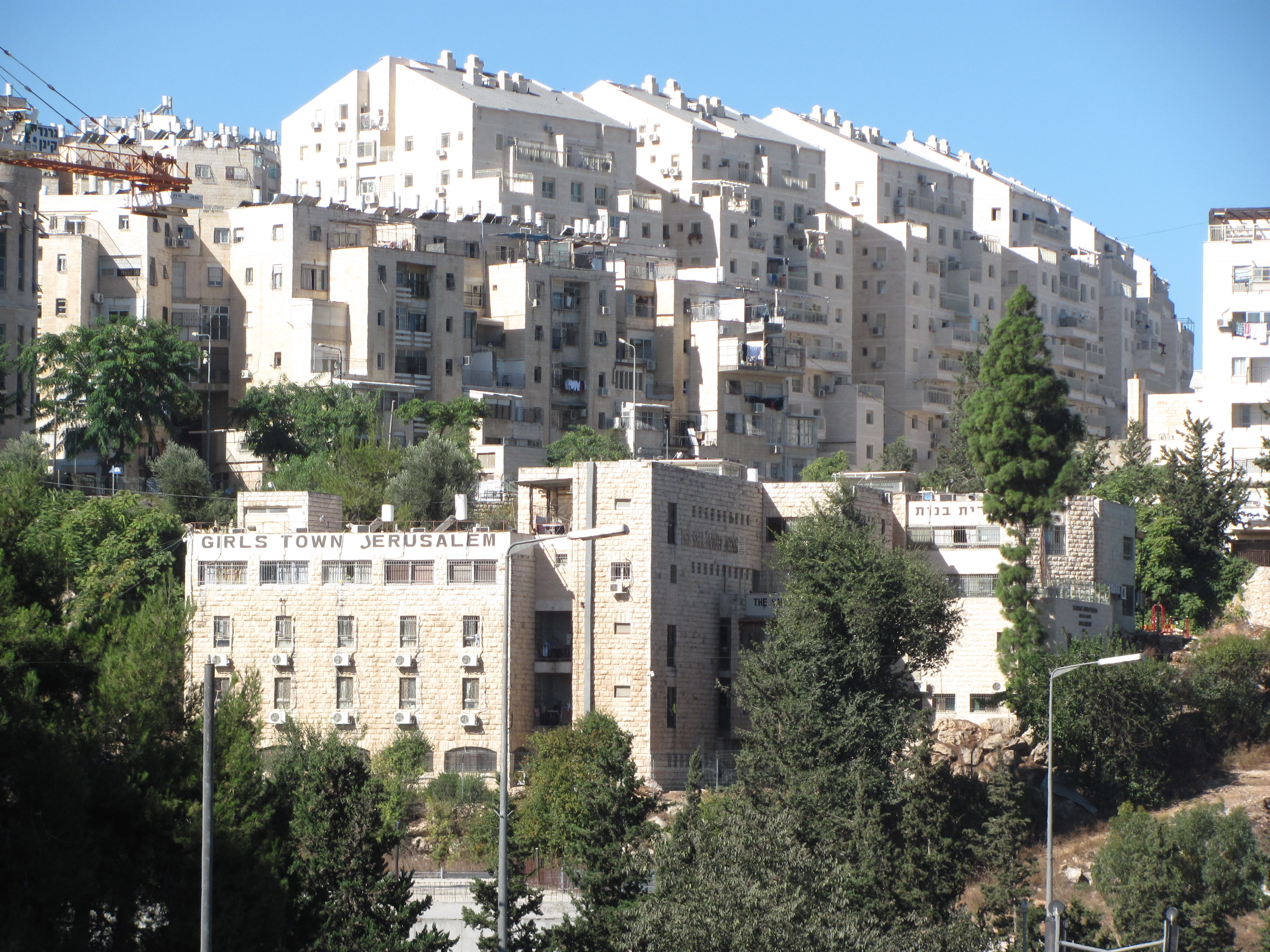
Kiryat Banot (Girls Town) orphanage, with buildings of Unsdorf and Kiryat Belz above

Unsdorf is home to several landmark educational centers. Beth Jacob Jerusalem, a prestigious Haredi girls' seminary and teacher training institute, was established by Dr. Bruria David in the early 1970s. Kiryat HaYeled (Children's Town), an orphanage for Haredi boys, was founded in 1973 by Rabbi Menachem Porush. Kiryat Banot (Girls Town) is the second campus of the Bayit Lepletot girls' orphanage located in Mea Shearim. Founded in 1973, the campus is situated on a hillside below the neighborhood; its street address is 55 Sorotzkin Street. The main branch of the Sulam Special Education Center, an early childhood intervention center, occupies a multi-story facility atop the Shearit Yosef synagogue on Sorotzkin Street.

Unsdorf also hosts several yeshivas: Yeshivas Daas Moshe, Yeshivat Zohar HaTorah, Yeshiva Toras Simcha and Yeshivat Ateret Shlomo. In the 2010s, a Bais Yaakov seminary, Chemdat Bais Yaakov, moved onto the premises of the former Maon Tzvia Mother & Baby Convalescent Home, which had operated since 1984. In 2011 a new American Yeshiva opened under the leadership of Rabbi Yeshaya Portnoy a notable resident of the neighborhood and former Rabbi in Kol Torah Yeshiva

== Synagogues ==
Synagogues and study halls in Unsdorf include:

- Be'er Shmuel Synagogue (Nusach Ashkenaz and Nusach Sefard)
- Shearit Yosef Synagogue (Edot HaMizrach)
- Trisk beit medrash
- Halakha LeMoshe beit medrash
- Schonfeld Synagogue (Children's Town)

== Notable residents ==
- Rabbi Pinchos Horovitz, Rav of Kiryat Unsdorf
- Rabbi Yitzchak Yechiel Ehrenfeld, Rav of Kiryat Mattersdorf and rosh yeshiva, Yeshivas Beis Shmuel
- Rabbi Yisroel Eichler, Member of Knesset
- Rabbi Binyamin Rimmer, rosh yeshivas Tchebin and Yeshivas Kiryas Melech
- Rabbi Eliyahu Abba Shaul, Jerusalem Religious Council representative for Kiryat Mattersdorf, Kiryat Itri, and Kiryat Unsdorf
- Rabbi Yissochor ("Suki") Berry, music composer and producer. His son, Israeli singer/musician Yitzy Berry, grew up here.
- Rabbi Yeshaya Portnoy, founder and Rosh Yeshiva of “Portnoys Yeshiva” and former director of the American program at Kol Torah - his son Yechezkel grew up here

== Sources ==
- Eisenberg, Ronald L. (2006). The Streets of Jerusalem: Who, What, Why. Devora Publishing. ISBN 1932687548.
