= Torah Ore =

Torah Ore ישיבת תורה אור

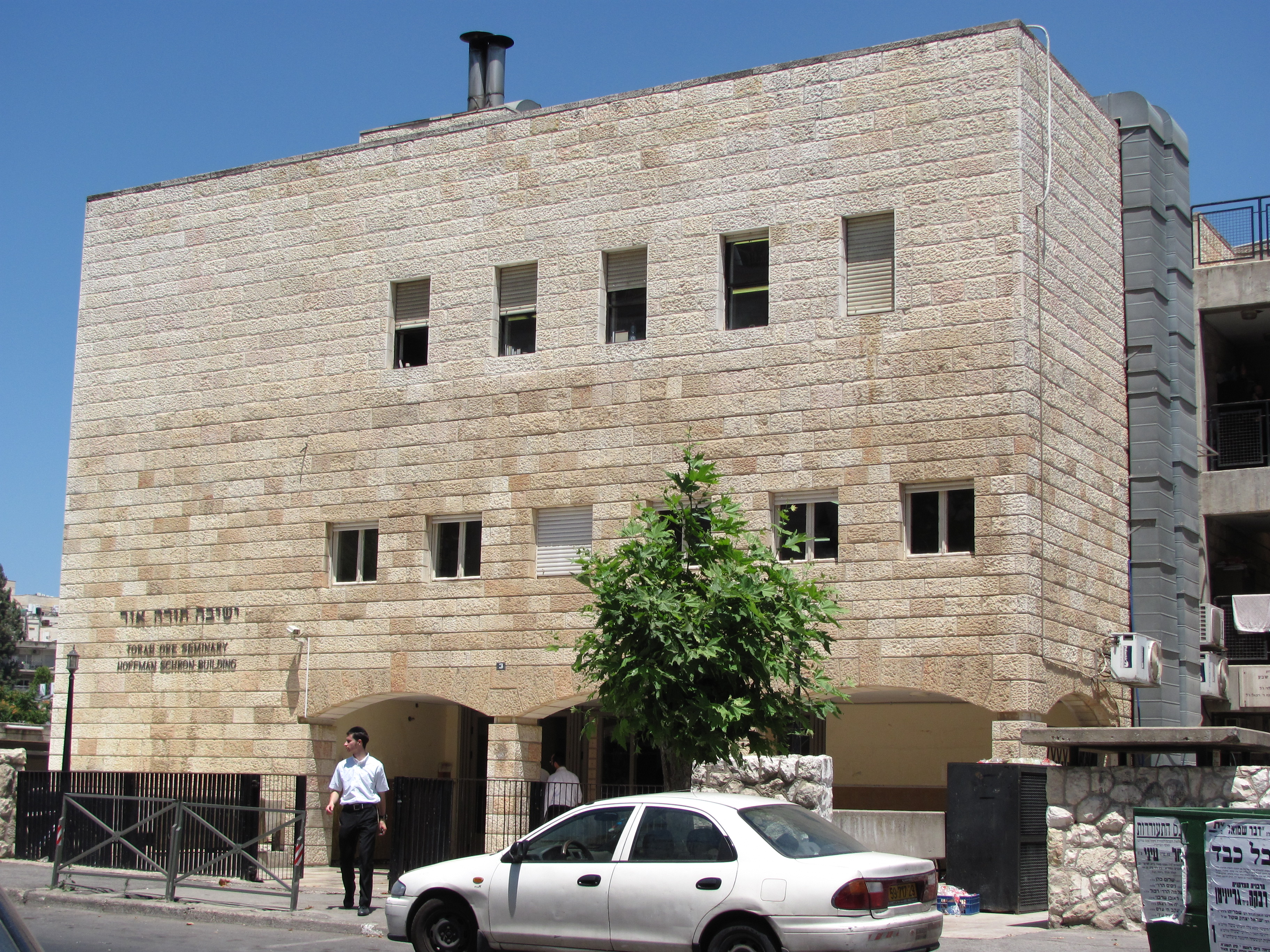

Address
- 3 Sorotzkin Street; Kiryat Mattersdorf; Jerusalem; Israel
- Coordinates: 31.7951°N 35.2040°E

Information
- School type: Yeshiva and Kollel
- Religious affiliation(s): Orthodox Judaism
- Founded: 1960
- Founder: Rabbi Chaim Pinchas Scheinberg
- Dean: Rabbi Simcha Scheinberg
- Gender: Male
- Age: Post-high school+
- Enrolment: 800 (2013)
- Website: torahore.org

Torah Ore (Hebrew: ישיבת תורה אור, "Torah is Light") is an American Orthodox post-high-school yeshiva and kollel located in the northern Jerusalem neighborhood of Kiryat Mattersdorf. It was founded in 1960 in Bensonhurst, Brooklyn, New York, by Rabbi Chaim Pinchas Scheinberg. The yeshiva moved to Jerusalem in 1965 and entered its present location in 1971. As of 2013, Torah Ore enrolls approximately 300 undergraduate students and 600 kollel (married) students. It has thousands of alumni, many of whom became prominent rabbis, rosh yeshivas, and lay leaders of Jewish communities around the globe. Scheinberg served as rosh yeshiva of Torah Ore for over 50 years until his death in 2012; he was succeeded by his son, Rabbi Simcha Scheinberg.

== Name ==
The yeshiva's name is derived from the verse in Proverbs: Ki ner mitzvah vTorah ore ("For the commandment is a lamp and the Torah is light"). (Proverbs 6:23).

== History ==
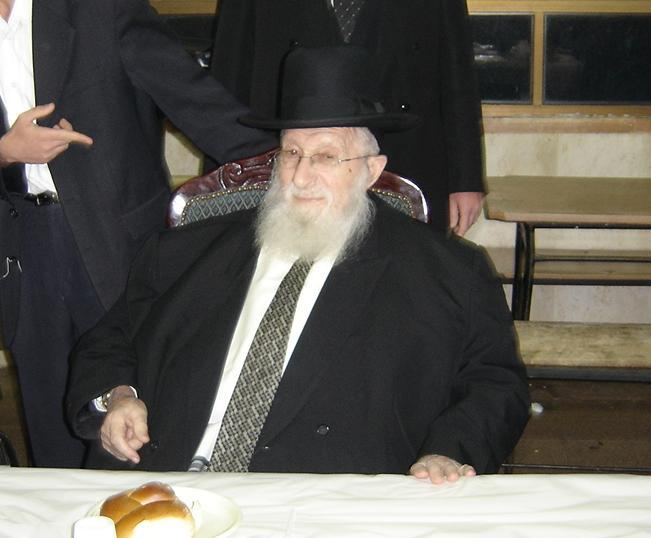
Rabbi Chaim Pinchas Scheinberg in 2010.

After serving as mashgiach ruchani in Yeshivas Chafetz Chaim in Williamsburg, Brooklyn, for 22 years, Rabbi Chaim Pinchas Scheinberg decided to open his own yeshiva, with the assistance of his brother, Rabbi Shmuel Scheinberg, and his son-in-law, Rabbi Chaim Dov Altusky. Torah Ore opened in Bensonhurst, Brooklyn, in 1960. The yeshiva opened with six students and grew steadily, enrolling many local Sephardi boys who were attracted by Scheinberg's Torah knowledge and warmth. Torah Ore was known both for its in-depth learning and the personal care extended to students by the rosh yeshiva and his wife, Bessie. The Scheinbergs paid the students' dental bills and raised money for their weddings.

In 1963 Bessie expressed interest in buying an apartment in the planned Haredi housing development of Kiryat Mattersdorf in Jerusalem, where her sister Ruchoma Shain also wanted to buy. Though Scheinberg was skeptical about relocating his family and his American yeshiva to Israel, he made a pilot trip to tour the development and decided that it could work. Rabbi Akiva Ehrenfeld, who was in charge of the construction and sale of the apartments, encouraged Scheinberg to move his yeshiva to Jerusalem by offering attractive terms for apartments and land for the yeshiva.

The Scheinbergs, their eldest daughter Fruma Rochel and her family, their son Simcha and his family, and over 20 of Rav Scheinberg's students moved into their new apartments in Kiryat Mattersdorf in May 1965. Rav Scheinberg reestablished the Torah Ore yeshiva in the Diskin Orphanage building in Jerusalem's Givat Shaul neighborhood. When the Six-Day War broke out in June 1967 and many American tourists headed home, Rav Scheinberg encouraged his students to stay, and none of the American students at Torah Ore left the yeshiva. During the war, Rav Scheinberg showed his complete devotion to his students, giving them encouragement and sleeping together with them in the bomb shelter.

After the war, Rav Scheinberg undertook plans to build a permanent home for the yeshiva. Torah Ore moved into its present building at 3 Sorotzkin Street in Kiryat Mattersdorf in 1971.

Rav Scheinberg fund-raised for his yeshiva, making regular trips to the United States, England, and Europe until the age of 100. He generally traveled during the six-week period from Rosh Chodesh Adar until just before Passover each year.

Rav Scheinberg died shortly before midnight on March 20, 2012, at the age of 101. His funeral procession was held in the streets of Yeshushalayim and attended by tens of thousands. Rav Sheinberg is buried at Mount of Olives Jewish Cemetery. His only son, Rabbi Simcha Scheinberg, succeeded him as rosh yeshiva of Torah Ore.

== Curriculum ==
The student body is divided into 24 chaburas (learning groups), of which 12 convene in the morning and 12 in the afternoon. Each group is led by an advanced scholar and has its own curriculum of Talmud and Halakha. The yeshiva also has an American beis medrash program for post-high school students.

== Notable faculty ==
- Rav Noach Orlowek, Mashgiach
- Rav Mordechai Altusky, Rosh Yeshiva

== Spin-off yeshivas ==
A number of yeshivas named in honor of Rabbi Chaim Pinchas Scheinberg were founded by his students. These include the Brooklyn, New York-based Yeshiva Derech Chaim and (now defunct) Yeshiva Nesivos Chaim, and the Israel-based Yeshiva Tiferes Chaim, Kollel Nefesh Hachaim, Kollel Ruach Chaim, Kollel Toras Chaim, and Yeshiva Shaarei Chaim. The latter yeshiva meets in the Torah Ore building.
