= Shmuel Ehrenfeld =

Austrian Orthodox Jewish rabbi

Rabbi Shmuel Ehrenfeld
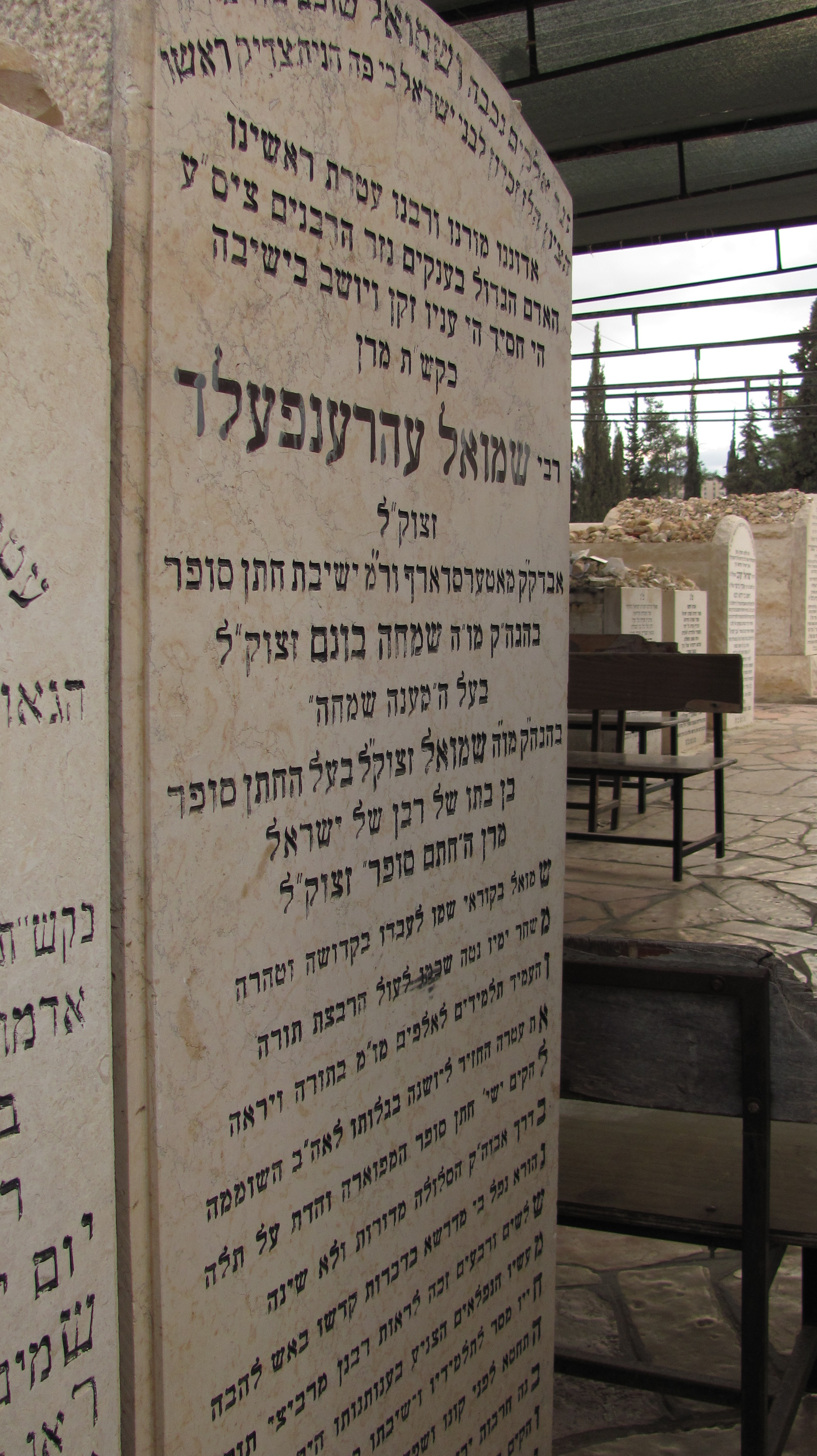
- Gravestone in Har HaMenuchot cemetery of Jerusalem
- Title: Mattersdorfer Rav

Personal life
- Born: Shmuel Ehrenfeld; 1891 Mattersdorf, Austria
- Died: May 22, 1980 (aged 88–89) New York City
- Buried: Jerusalem
- Spouse: Rochel Ehrenfeld
- Children: 6, including Akiva Ehrenfeld
- Parent(s): Simcha Bunim Ehrenfeld; Gittel Krauss

Religious life
- Religion: Judaism
- Denomination: Haredi
- Semikhah: Meir Arik and Yosef Engel

Shmuel Ehrenfeld (Yiddish: שמואל עהרענפעלד, 1891–1980), known as the Mattersdorfer Rav, was an Orthodox Jewish rabbi in pre-war Austria and later in post-war America. He established Yeshivas Ch'san Sofer in New York City and taught thousands of students who went on to become leaders of American Torah Jewry. He also founded the neighborhood of Kiryat Mattersdorf in Jerusalem, where his son and grandson became prominent Torah educators. He was the great-great-grandson of the Chasam Sofer through the Chasam Sofer's daughter Hindel, who married Rabbi Dovid Tzvi Ehrenfeld.

== Family background ==
Shmuel Ehrenfeld was born and raised in Mattersdorf, Austria. His parents were Rabbi Simcha Bunim Ehrenfeld, rav of Mattersdorf, and Rebbetzin Gittel Krauss. His paternal grandfather, Rabbi Shmuel Ehrenfeld (1835–1883), known as the Chasan Sofer, was one of the oldest grandsons of the Chasam Sofer.

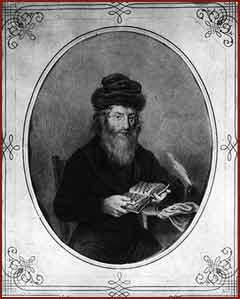
The Chasam Sofer

In addition to founding the Sofer-Ehrenfeld family line, the Chasam Sofer set the precedent for his family members to serve as rav of the Austrian town of Mattersdorf and head the yeshiva there. Mattersdorf had a Jewish presence going back to the eleventh century. The Chasam Sofer became rav of the town in 1798. When he left to become rav of Pressburg in 1807, he was succeeded in Mattersdorf by his uncle, Rabbi Bunim Eger (brother of Rabbi Akiva Eger), and then by his son, Rabbi Shimon Sofer (the Michtav Sofer). When Rabbi Shimon Sofer left to become rav in Kraków, the Chasam Sofer's eldest grandson, Rabbi Shmuel Ehrenfeld (the Chasan Sofer (Hebrew: חתן סופר, an acronym for חידושי תורה נכד סופר, Chidushei Torah Neched Sofer, "Torah Insights of the Grandson of Sofer"), became rav of Mattersdorf. After Rabbi Shmuel's death on 4 August 1883 (1 Av, 5643), he was succeeded by his son, Rabbi Simcha Bunim Ehrenfeld (the Maaneh Simcha). When the latter died on 18 July 1926 (7 Av, 5686), he was succeeded by his son, Rabbi Shmuel Ehrenfeld.

Young Shmuel was an erudite scholar. He received rabbinic ordination from Rabbi Meir Arik and Rabbi Yosef Engel at the age of 19. Two years later, when his father fell ill, Shmuel ran the Mattersdorf yeshiva in his place.

He married his first cousin, Rochel Ehrenfeld, daughter of his uncle, Rabbi Dovid Tzvi Ehrenfeld. They had two sons, Simcha Bunim and Akiva, and five daughters.

== Community leader ==
Ehrenfeld assumed the leadership of the Mattersdorf community after his father's death in 1926. His opinions and halakhic rulings were widely respected, and he also served as president of the Siebengemeinden (Sheva Kehillos, or Seven Communities) of Burgenland. He also had frequent dealings with government officials. He was instrumental in changing public policy to exempt Jewish students from studying in public schools and to have religious rather than secular teachers teach secular subjects in Torah schools. He also lobbied for Jewish soldiers to be granted leave on Shabbat and Yom Tov. For his accomplishments, he was awarded a gold medal from the Austrian government.

His leadership of the community ended abruptly in 1938 with the Anschluss. On Saturday, 12 March 1938, German soldiers raided the Mattersdorf synagogue during services and ripped the prayer shawls off the worshippers. Commandant Koch warned Ehrenfeld that unless all 4,000 Jews in the district left immediately, they would all be killed. After making many efforts to help relocate community members to safer shores, Ehrenfeld escaped with his family to America, where he arrived on 13 September 1938.

== America ==
Ehrenfeld's first priority was the re-establishment of the Mattersdorf yeshiva in America. Two months after his arrival, he opened Yeshivas Ch'san Sofer on the Lower East Side. The yeshiva later moved to Boro Park, where it currently enrolls over 400 students in kindergarten through twelfth grade and operates a Head Start Program and rabbinical seminary. Ehrenfeld appointed his son-in-law, Rabbi Shmuel Binyomin Fisher, as yeshiva administrator in 1942. Another son-in-law, Rabbi Binyomin Paler, became a maggid shiur and eventually rosh yeshiva in the yeshiva, until he left to form his own yeshiva in 1965.

Ehrenfeld also served as Rav in three Lower East Side synagogues, Anshei Marmarosh, Chevrah Eitz Chaim, and the Stropkover Chevrah.

== Founding Kiryat Mattersdorf ==
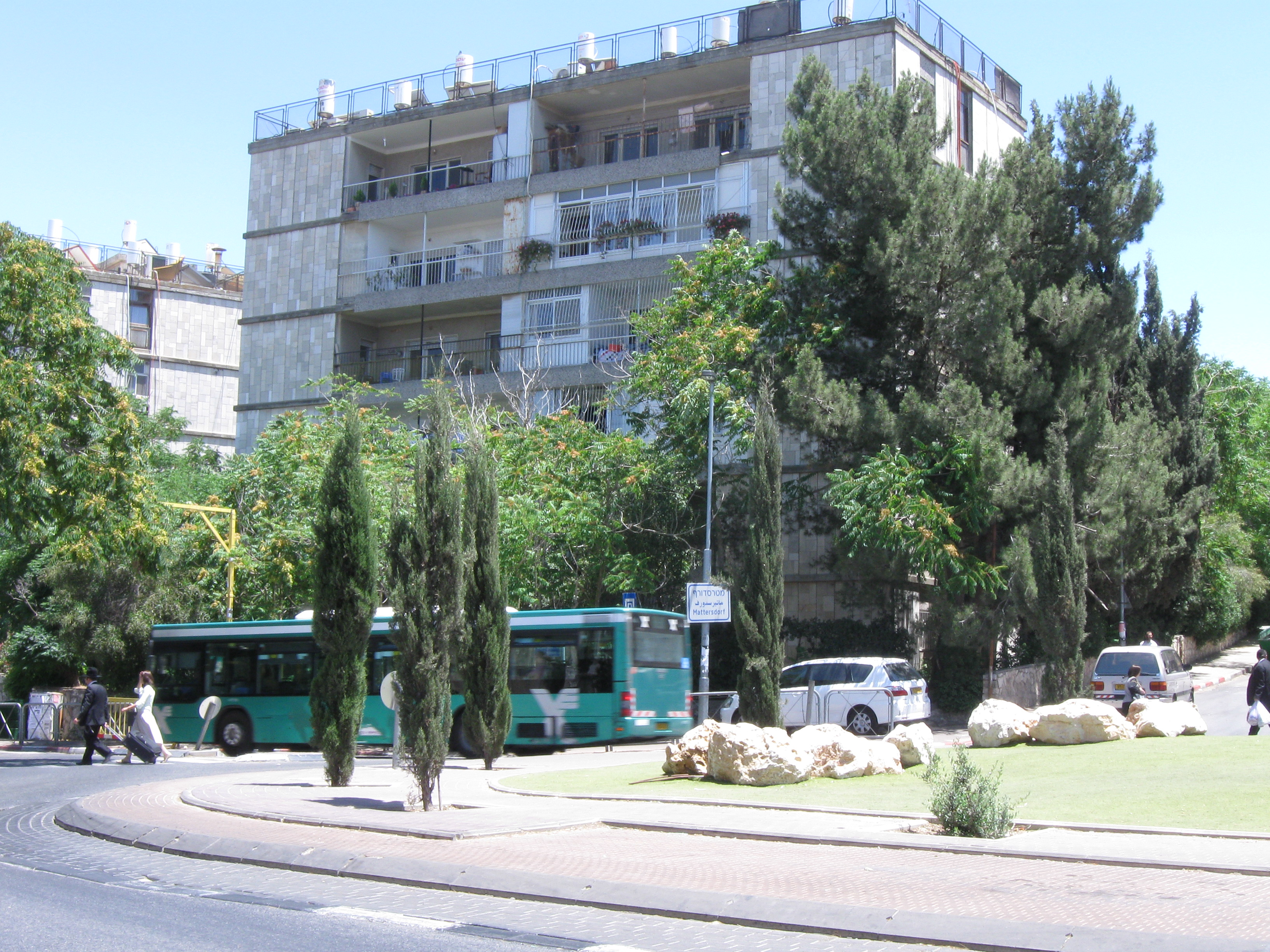
Western entrance to Kiryat Mattersdorf

Ehrenfeld founded the Torah community of Kiryat Mattersdorf in northern Jerusalem in memory of the Siebengemeinden (Seven Communities) of Burgenland which were destroyed in the Holocaust, Mattersdorf being one of them. He appointed his son, Rabbi Akiva Ehrenfeld (1923–2012), as his representative to supervise the construction and sale of apartments, but declined to serve as the new neighborhood's Rav. Instead, his son Akiva became president of the Chasan Sofer Institutions in Israel while his grandson, Rabbi Yitzchok Yechiel Ehrenfeld, became Rav of Kiryat Mattersdorf.

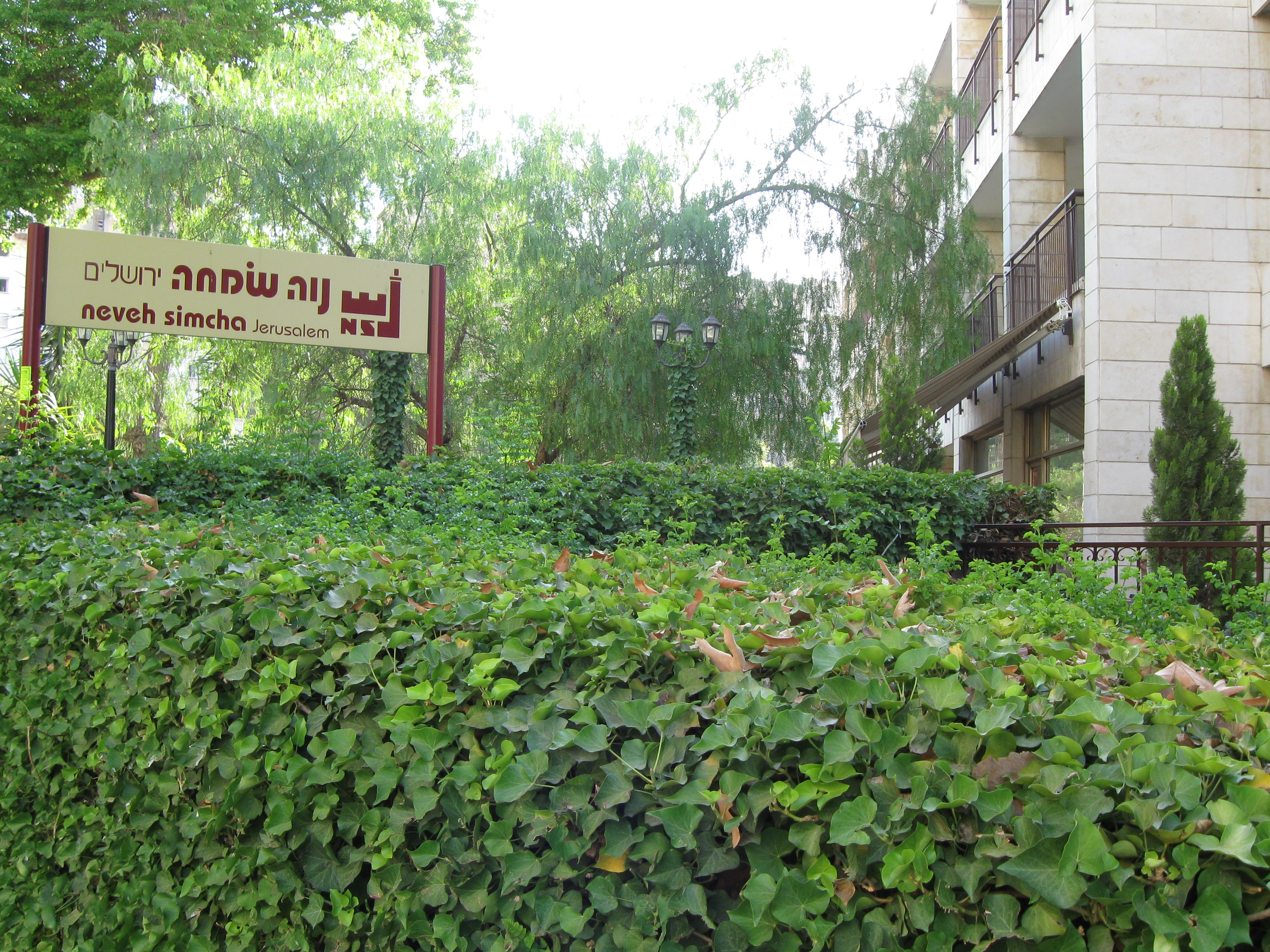
Neveh Simcha nursing home, which serves the Haredi public of northern Jerusalem

Among the institutions which Ehrenfeld founded were Talmud Torah Maaneh Simcha; Yeshiva Maaneh Simcha; two synagogues named Heichal Shmuel, one for nusach Ashkenaz and one for nusach Sefard; and the Neveh Simcha nursing home, named after his father. The outermost street in the neighborhood is named Maaneh Simcha after his father's Torah work. Akiva Ehrenfeld moved to Kiryat Mattersdorf in the early 1990s and served as president of all these institutions. Akiva Ehrenfeld also founded Yeshivas Beis Shmuel, named for his father, in the mid-1980s.

Ehrenfeld also established the first Talmud Torah in Petah Tikva, also named Chasan Sofer, in 1954.

== Death and burial ==
Ehrenfeld died on the second day of Shavuot, 22 May 1980, after reading Megillas Rus (the Book of Ruth, which is traditionally read in synagogues on Shavuot morning). His funeral began in Yeshivas Ch'san Sofer in Boro Park on 23 May. Among the rabbis eulogizing him were Yaakov Kamenetsky, the Satmar Rebbe, and Shneur Kotler. His body was then flown to London, where he was eulogized by rabbis Shmuel Wosner and Yitzchok Yaakov Weiss, among others. The body was then flown to Israel and buried on Har HaMenuchot near the grave of the Belzer Rebbe, Aharon Rokeach.

His son, Simcha Bunim Ehrenfeld, succeeded him as Mattersdorfer Rav.
