= Akiva Ehrenfeld =

Rabbi Akiva Ehrenfeld עקיבא עהרענפעלד
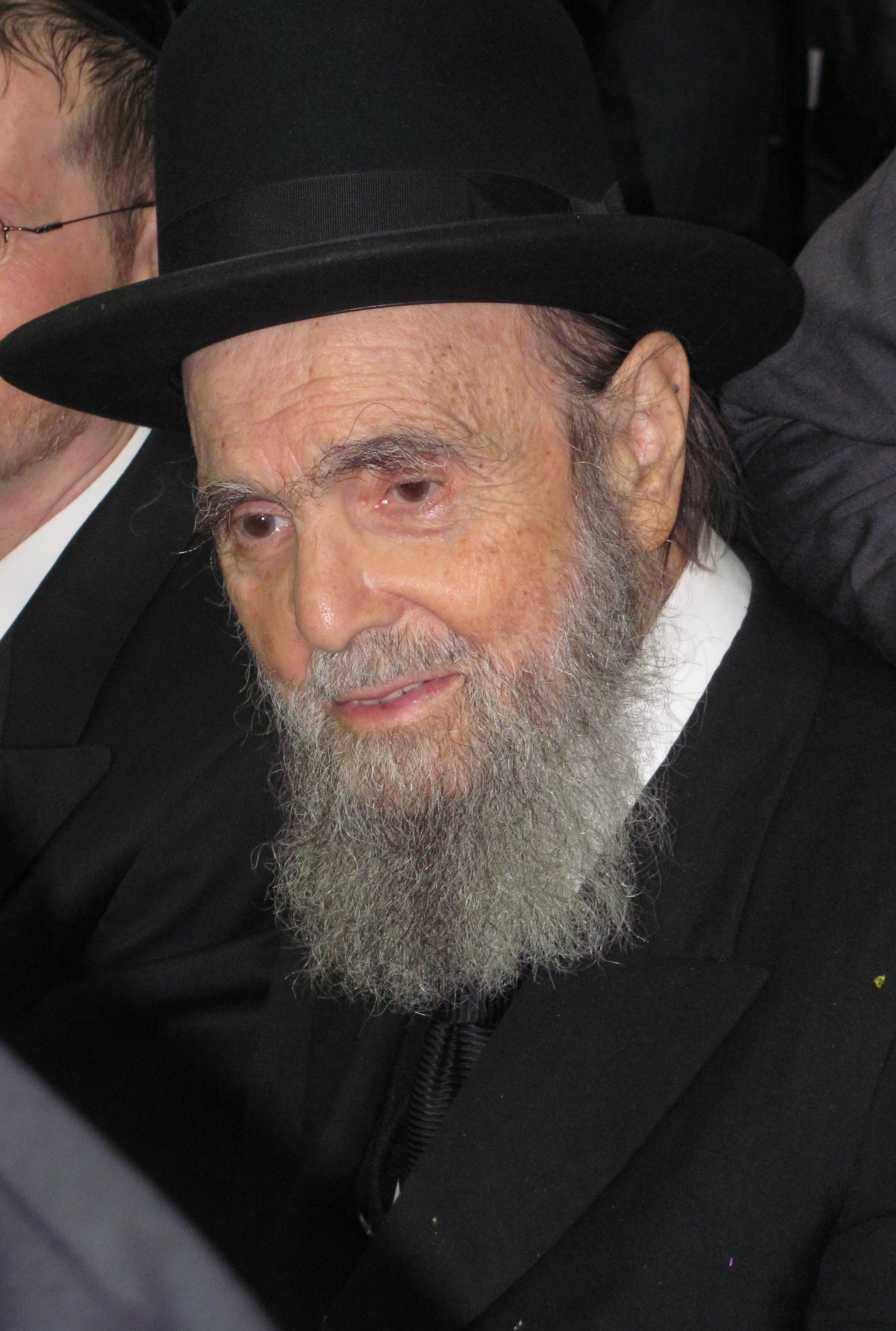
- Rabbi Ehrenfeld in January 2011

Personal life
- Born: Akiva Ehrenfeld; 1923 Mattersdorf, Austria
- Died: 16 August 2012 (aged 88–89) Jerusalem, Israel
- Buried: Har HaMenuchot
- Children: Yitzchok Yechiel; Golda; Gittel; Faiga; Miriam; Esther
- Parent(s): Rabbi Shmuel Ehrenfeld; Rochel Ehrenfeld

Religious life
- Religion: Judaism
- Denomination: Haredi

Jewish leader
- Position: President
- Organisation: Kiryat Mattersdorf
- Residence: Jerusalem, Israel

Akiva Ehrenfeld (Hebrew: עקיבא עהרענפעלד; 1923 – 16 August 2012) was an Orthodox Jewish rabbi who helped establish the Kiryat Mattersdorf and Unsdorf neighborhoods of northern Jerusalem. He served as president of Kiryat Mattersdorf and president of the Chasan Sofer Institutions in the United States.

== Biography ==
He was born in Mattersdorf, Austria, to Rabbi Shmuel Ehrenfeld, then rosh yeshiva of the Mattersdorf yeshiva, and Rochel Ehrenfeld. His parents were first cousins. He was named after his parents' ancestor, Rabbi Akiva Eger. Akiva's great-grandfather, Rabbi Shmuel Ehrenfeld (the Chasan Sofer), was the eldest grandson of the Chasam Sofer. At the time of his birth, his grandfather, Rabbi Simcha Bunim Ehrenfeld, was the Rav of the city; upon his death in 1926, Rabbi Shmuel Ehrenfeld succeeded him as Rav. Akiva had a younger brother, Simcha Bunim, and five sisters.

The family fled Austria in 1938 with the Anschluss. They arrived in New York on September 13, 1938. Two months later, Akiva's father established Yeshivas Ch'san Sofer on the Lower East Side.

Akiva studied in Yeshiva Torah Vodaas and later joined his father's yeshiva, Yeshivas Ch'san Sofer. In 1954 he married the daughter of Rabbi Chaim Tzvi Krieger, formerly Rav of Brussels, Belgium. The couple had one son and five daughters.

== Establishing Kiryat Mattersdorf ==
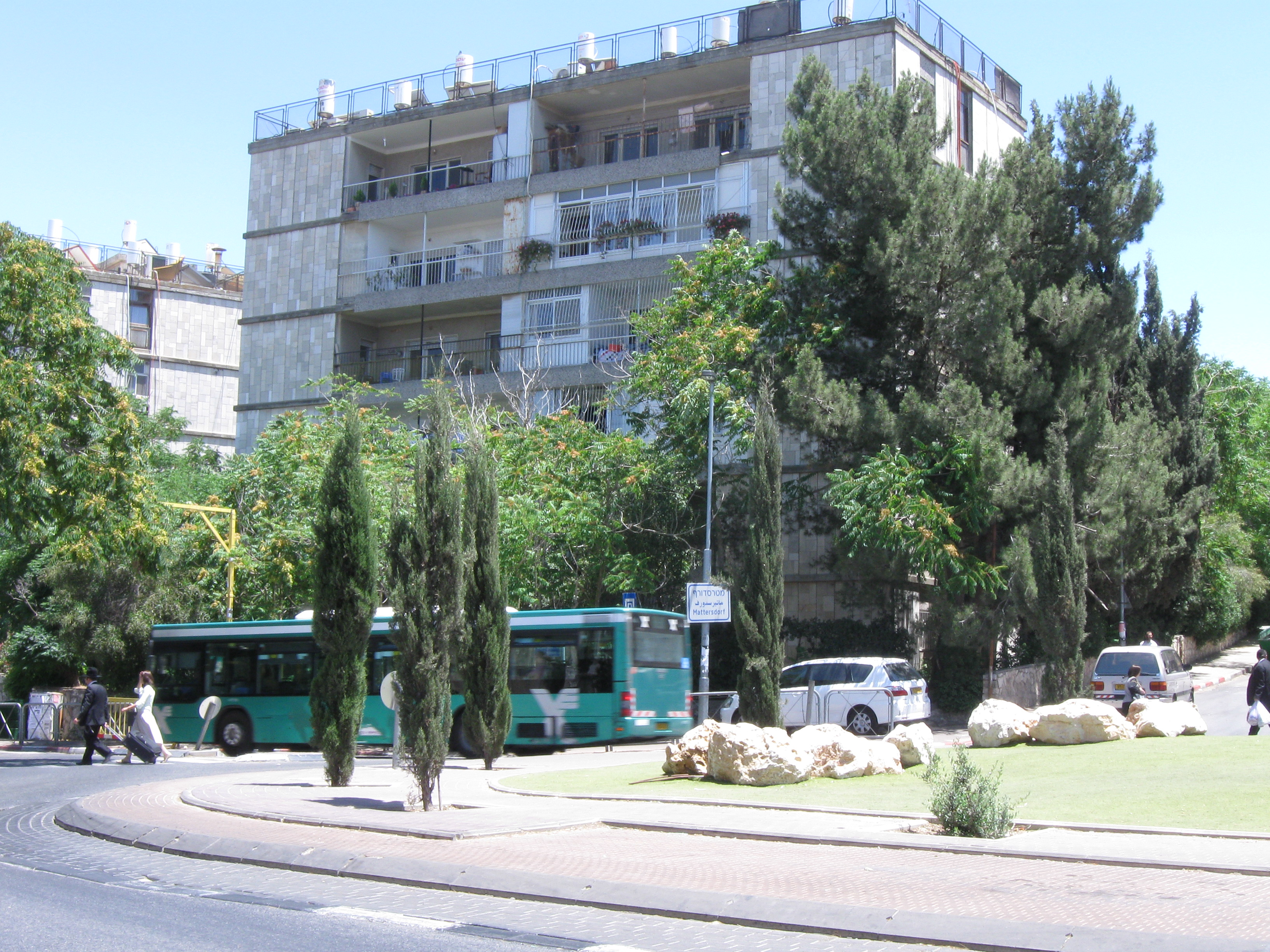
Western entrance to Kiryat Mattersdorf.

In 1958 the Mattersdorfer Rav founded the Haredi community of Kiryat Mattersdorf in northern Jerusalem in memory of the Siebengemeinden (Seven Communities) of Burgenland, Austria, which were destroyed in the Holocaust, Mattersdorf being one of them. He appointed Ehrenfeld as his representative to supervise the construction and sale of apartments. Ehrenfeld sold some of the first apartments in the neighborhood to Rabbi Chaim Pinchas Scheinberg, his family members and students, encouraging Scheinberg to relocate his yeshiva, Torah Ore, to Jerusalem from Bensonhurst, Brooklyn by offering attractive terms for apartments and land for the yeshiva at the southeast end of the neighborhood. Torah Ore opened in Kiryat Mattersdorf in 1971. Ehrenfeld also encouraged other Torah institutions to populate the community.

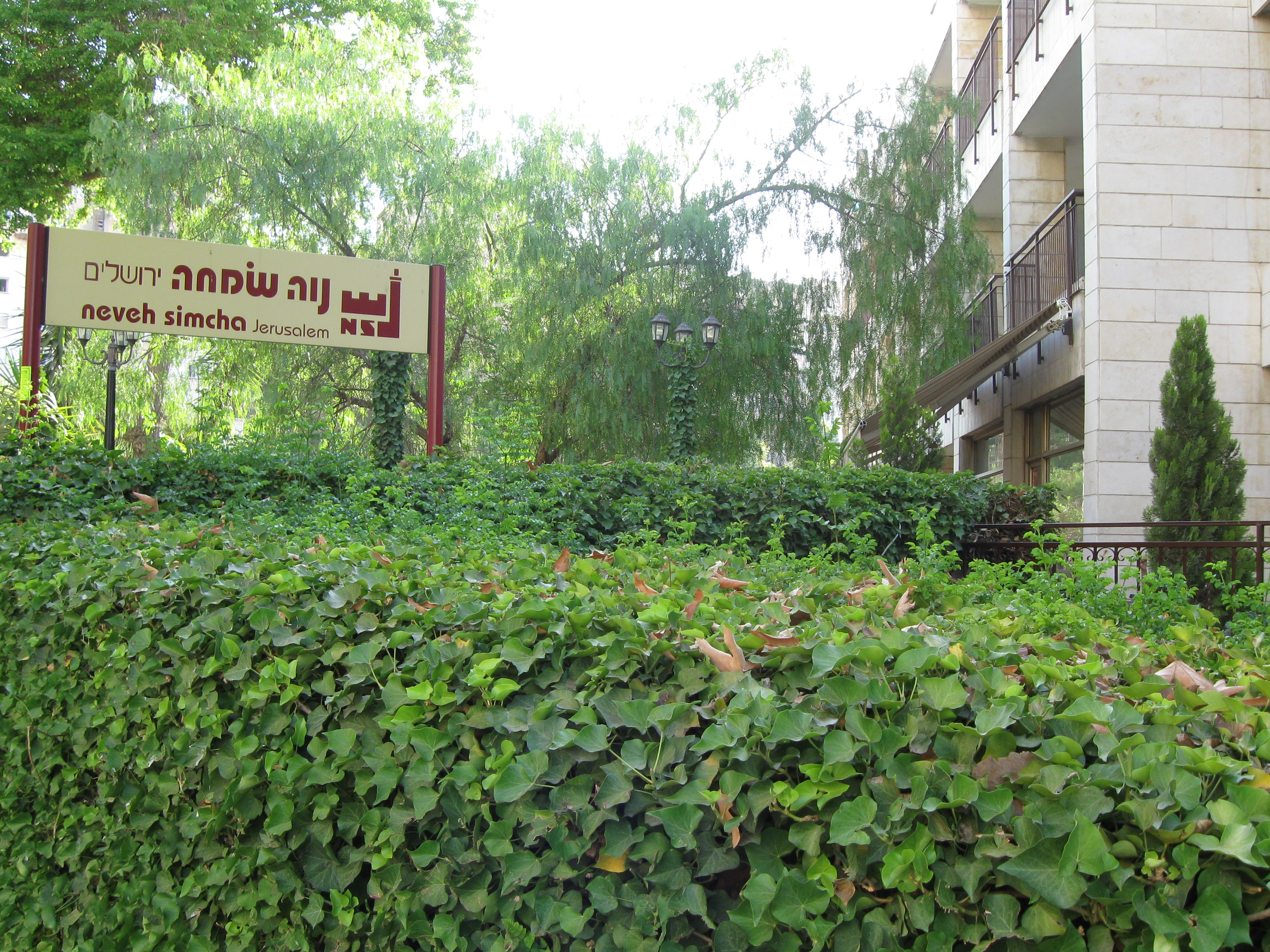
Neveh Simcha nursing home, which serves the Haredi public of northern Jerusalem.

Among the institutions that the Mattersdorfer Rav founded were Talmud Torah Maaneh Simcha; Yeshiva Maaneh Simcha; two synagogues named Heichal Shmuel, one for nusach Ashkenaz and one for nusach Sefard; and the Neveh Simcha nursing home, named after his father. The outermost street in the neighborhood is named Maaneh Simcha after his father's Torah work.

Akiva Ehrenfeld moved to Kiryat Mattersdorf in the early 1990s and served as president of all these institutions. Akiva Ehrenfeld also founded Yeshivas Beis Shmuel, named for his father, in the mid-1980s. He established close ties with the government of Austria to obtain funding for several institutions, including a kindergarten and the Neveh Simcha nursing home. Following an official state visit to Israel by Austrian President Thomas Klestil in 1994, which included a side tour of Kiryat Mattersdorf, Klestil hosted Ehrenfeld at an official reception at the Hofburg Palace in Vienna on January 24, 1995.

Ehrenfeld declined to serve as the neighborhood's Rav. Instead, he acted as president of Kiryat Mattersdorf while his only son, Rabbi Yitzchok Yechiel Ehrenfeld, became the Rav of the neighborhood.

== Death and burial ==
Ehrenfeld underwent surgery for an abdominal obstruction on July 16, 2012 (Tisha B'Av) but did not recover. He died on August 16, 2012, at Shaare Zedek Medical Center and was buried that night on Har HaMenuchot near the grave of his father.
