= Kiryat Mattersdorf =

Haredi neighborhood in Jerusalem

Coordinates: 31°47′44.94″N 35°12′6.73″E

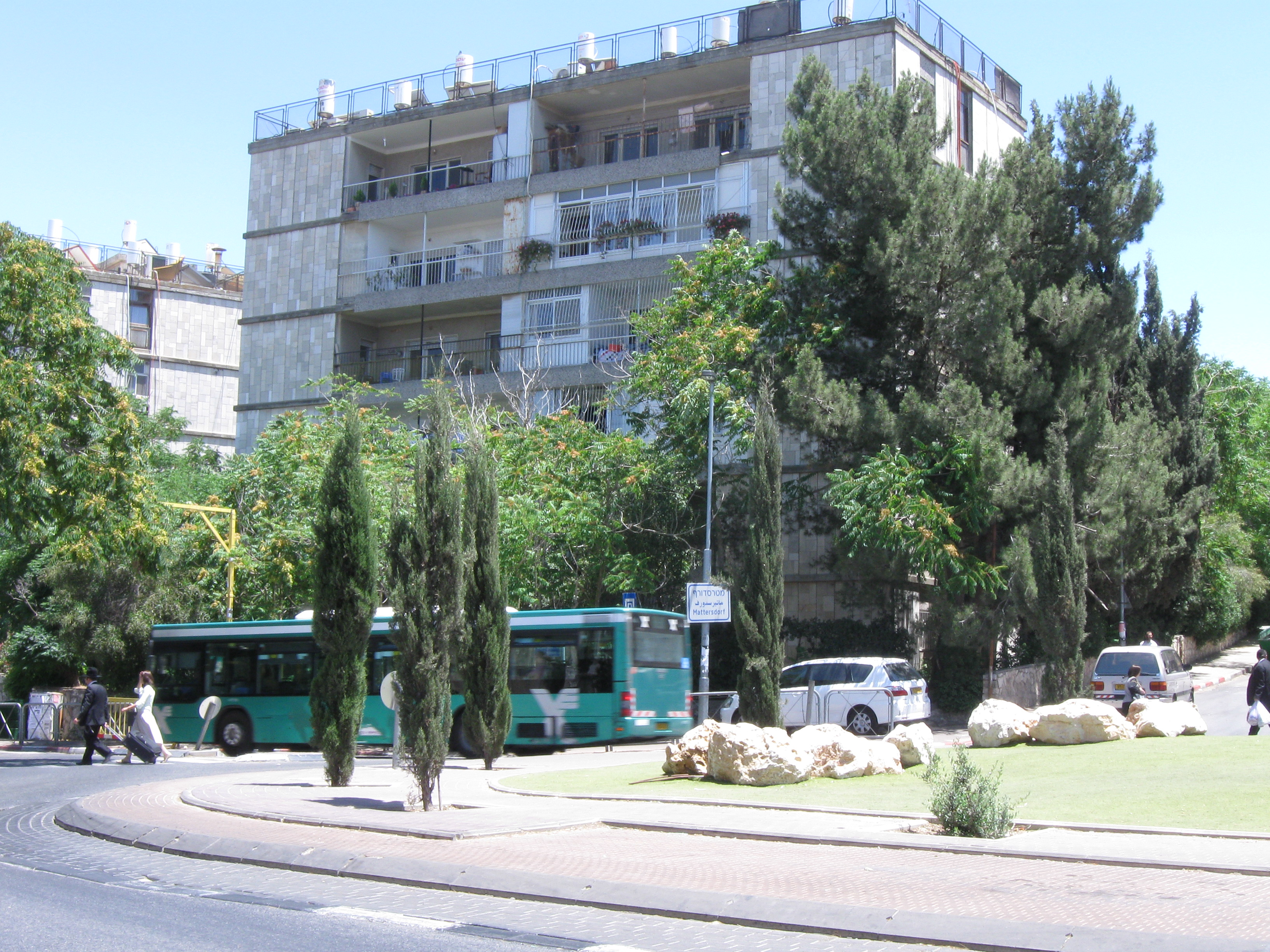
Western entrance to Kiryat Mattersdorf.

Kiryat Mattersdorf (Hebrew: קרית מטרסדורף) is a Haredi neighborhood in Jerusalem. It is located on the northern edge of the mountain plateau on which central Jerusalem lies. It is named after Mattersburg (formerly Mattersdorf), a town in Austria with a long Jewish history. It borders Kiryat Itri and Romema. The main thoroughfare is Panim Meirot Street, which segues into Sorotzkin Street at the neighborhood's eastern end. In 2015, Kiryat Mattersdorf had approximately 700 residents.

A lesser known name for the neighborhood is Kiryat Sheva Kehillos, in memory of the Siebengemeinden (Seven Communities) of Burgenland which were destroyed in the Holocaust, Mattersdorf being one of them.

== History ==
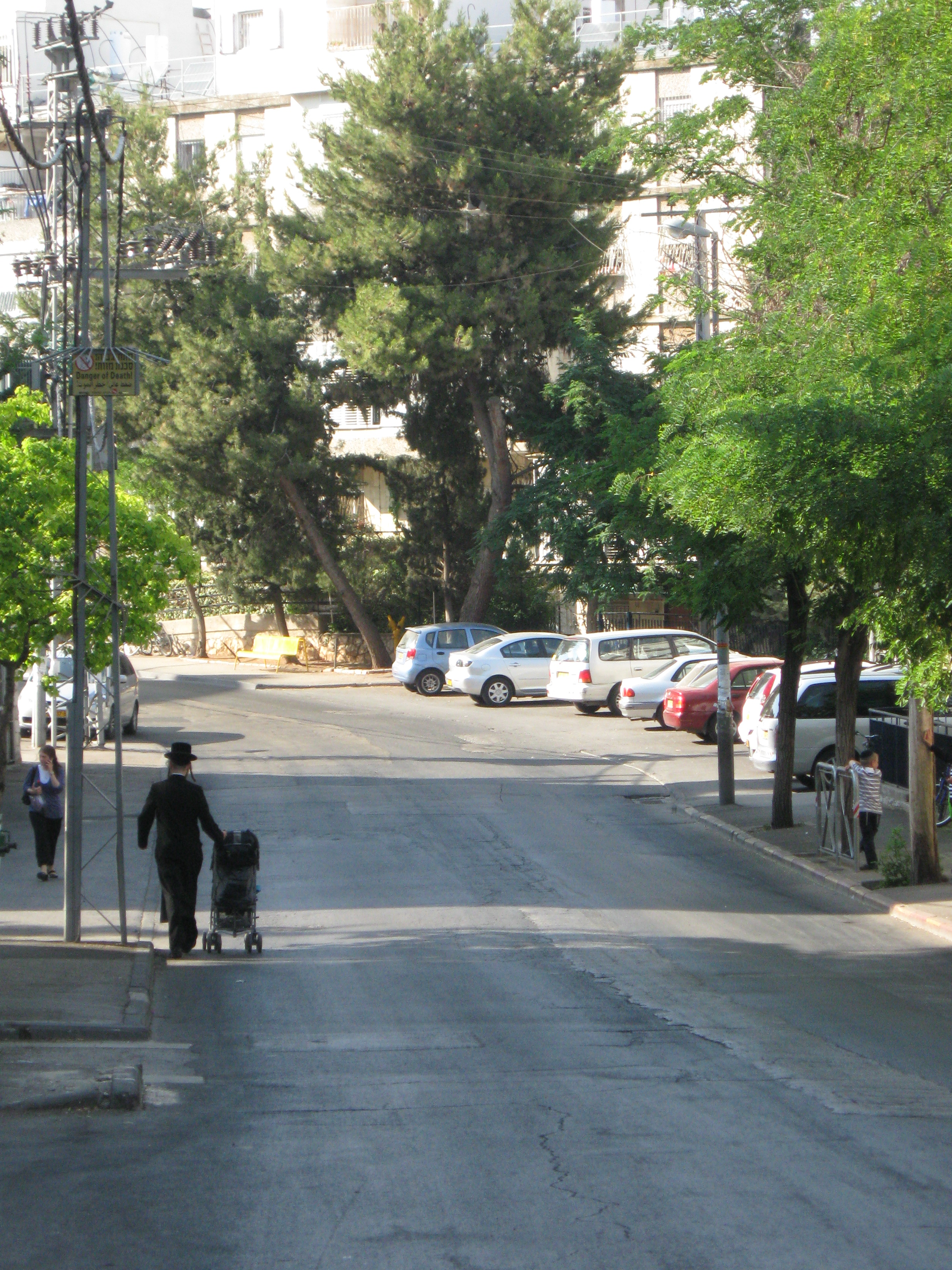
The main thoroughfare, Panim Meirot Street.

Kiryat Mattersdorf was founded in 1958 by the Mattersdorfer Rav, Rabbi Shmuel Ehrenfeld, whose ancestors had served as Rav of the Hungarian, later Austrian town of Nagymarton (later Mattersdorf, now Mattersburg) for centuries, starting with his great-great-grandfather, the Chasam Sofer, in 1798. When the community was evicted from Austria during the Anschluss of 1938, the Mattersdorfer Rav re-established his yeshiva in New York. On one of his visits to Israel in 1958, accompanied by Rav Avrum Mayer Israel, Honyader Ruv, he purchased the land and established a new neighborhood, in commemoration of the seven communities of Burgenland, Mattersdorf among them, that had been destroyed by the Nazis. In 1959, he sent one of his sons, Rabbi Akiva Ehrenfeld, to supervise the construction and selling of apartments and public institutions in the new neighborhood.

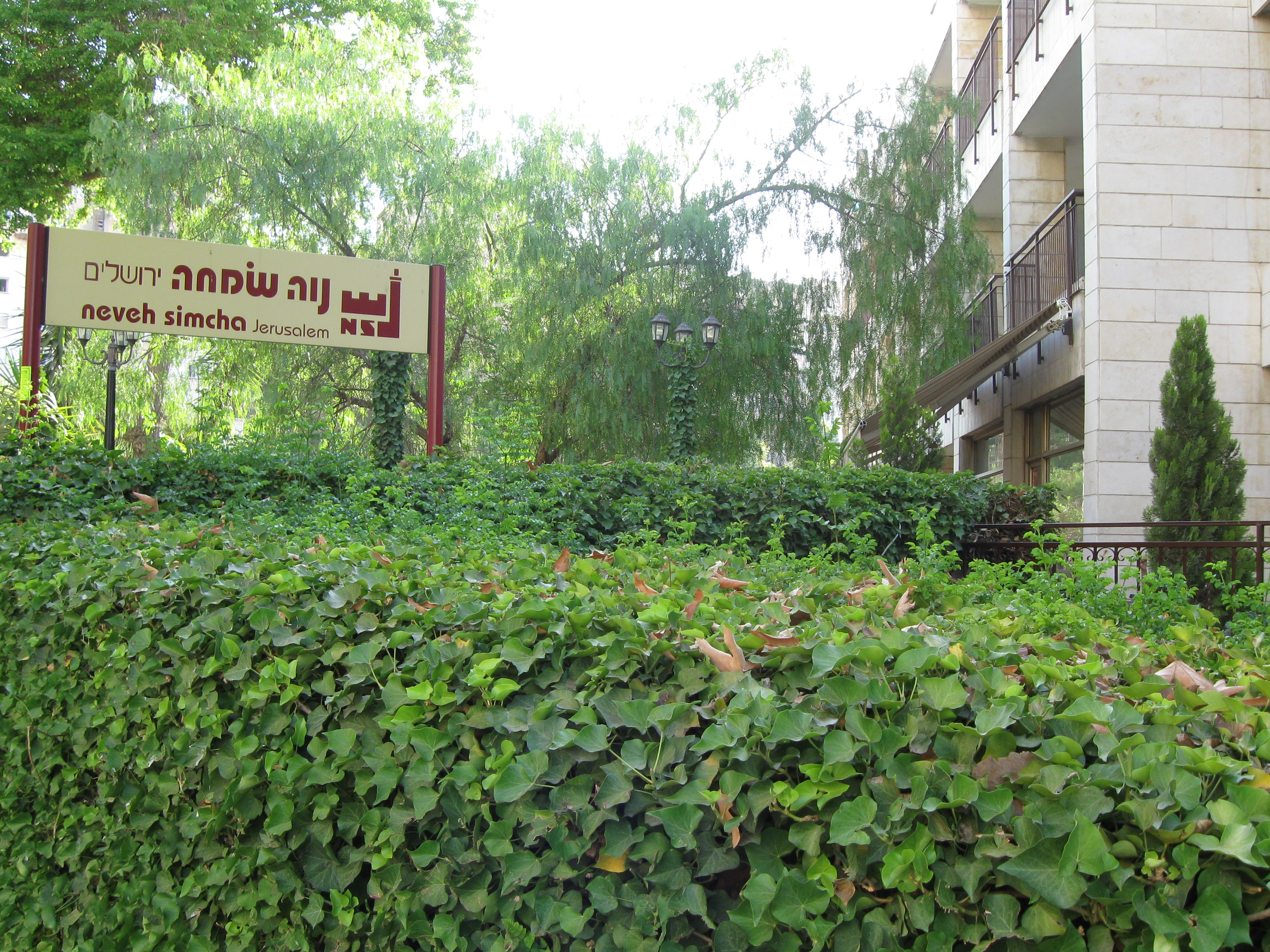
Neveh Simcha nursing home, which serves the Haredi public of northern Jerusalem.

Among the institutions that the Mattersdorfer Rav set up were Talmud Torah Maaneh Simcha; Yeshiva Maaneh Simcha; two synagogues named Heichal Shmuel, one for nusach Ashkenaz, and one for nusach Sefard; and the Neveh Simcha nursing home, named after his father. The outermost street in the neighborhood is named Maaneh Simcha, after his father's Torah work. Akiva Ehrenfeld moved to Kiryat Mattersdorf in the early 1990s, and served as president of all these institutions. Akiva Ehrenfeld also founded Yeshivas Beis Shmuel, named for his father, in the mid-1980s.

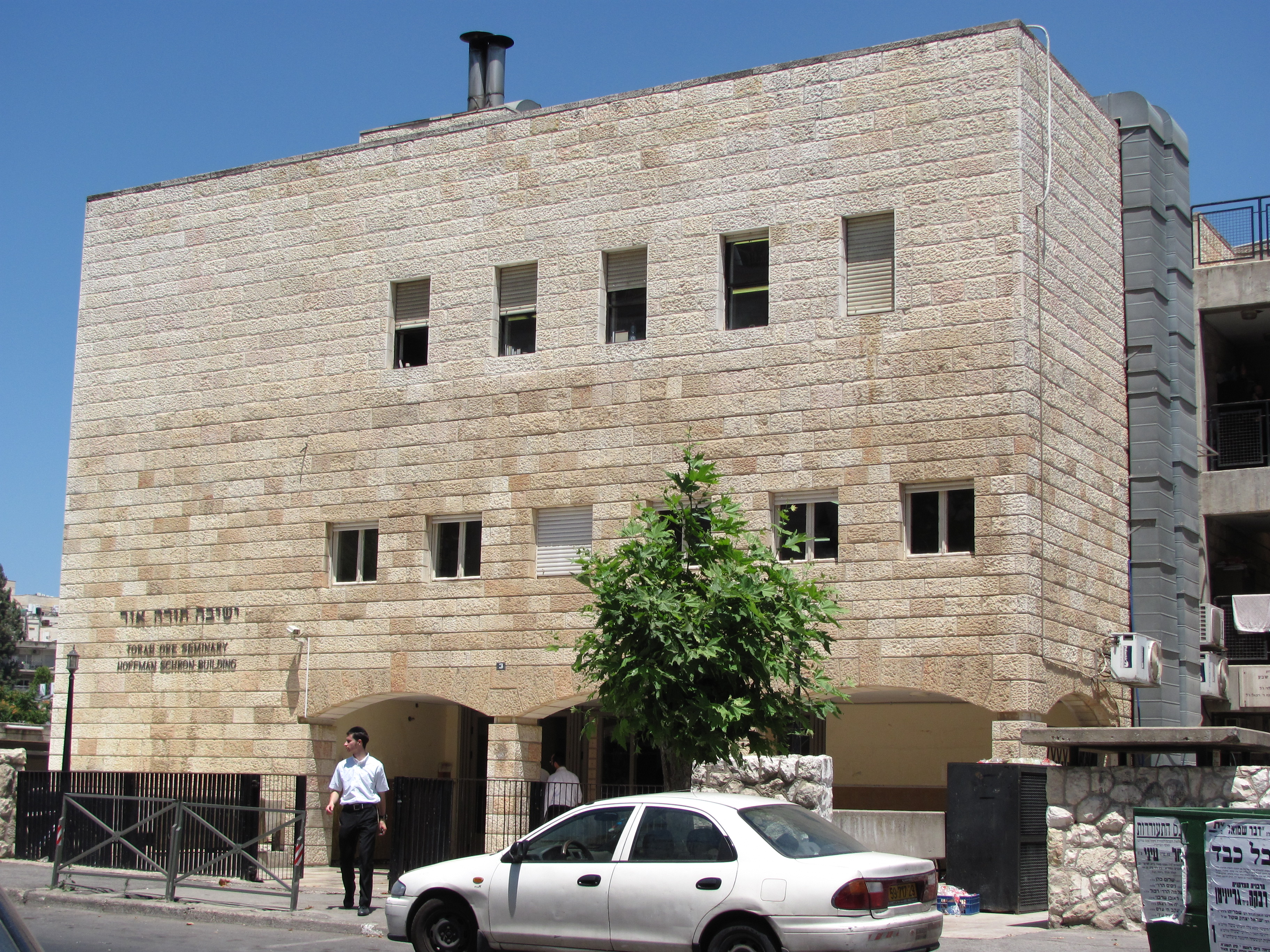
Torah Ore Yeshiva

The cornerstone for the neighborhood was laid in spring 1963, and the first apartments were ready for occupancy in May 1965. The first occupants included Rabbi Chaim Pinchas Scheinberg and his wife Bessie; his son Rabbi Simcha Scheinberg and his family; his daughter Rebbetzin Fruma Rochel Altusky and her family; and more than 20 students from Rabbi Chaim Scheinberg's yeshiva, Torah Ore. Akiva Ehrenfeld was the one who encouraged Scheinberg to relocate his yeshiva to Jerusalem from Bensonhurst, Brooklyn, offering attractive terms for apartments and land for the yeshiva at the southeast end of the neighborhood. Ehrenfeld also encouraged other Torah institutions to populate the community.

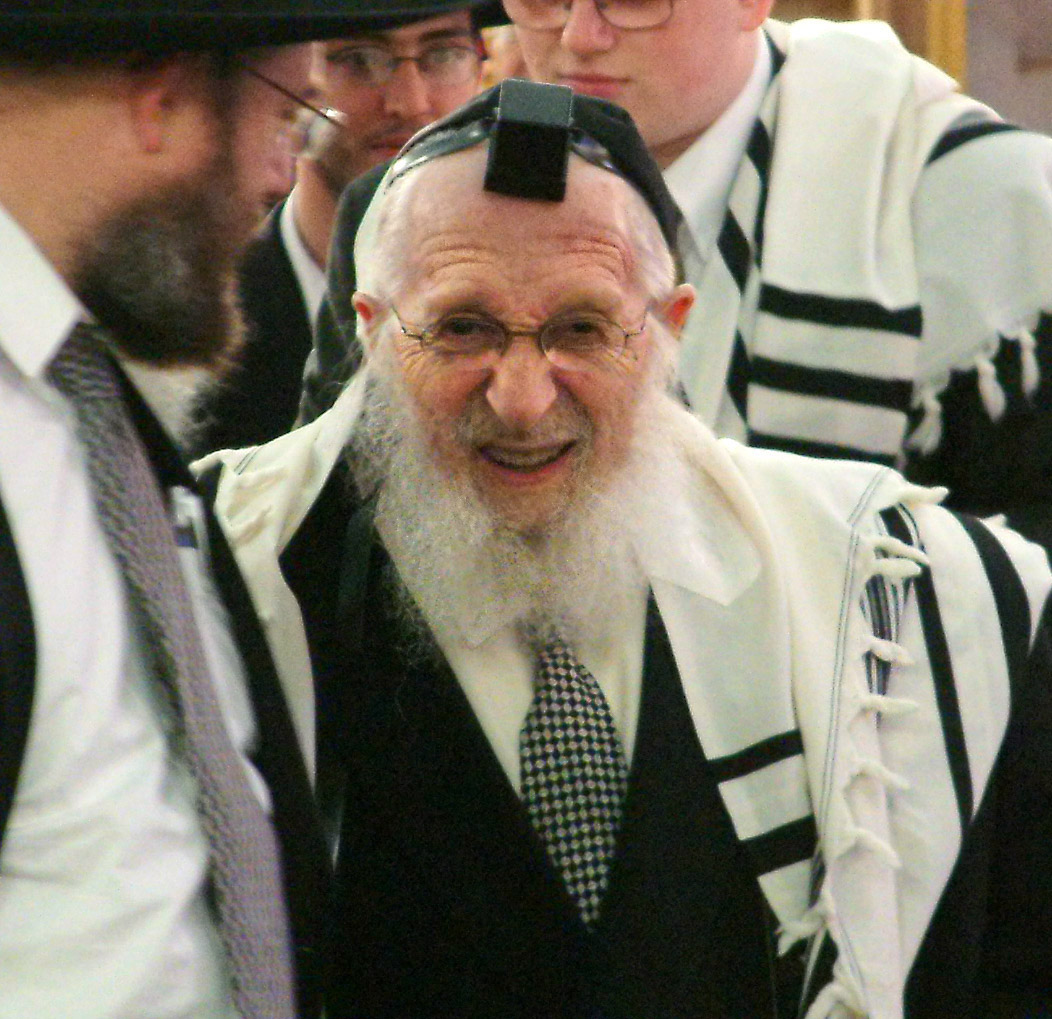
Rabbi Chaim Pinchas Scheinberg, rabbi of the neighborhood

Kiryat Mattersdorf was the first neighborhood to be built in northern Jerusalem; it was joined in subsequent years by Kiryat Itri, Kiryat Unsdorf, Kiryat Sanz, and HaMem Gimmel Street of northern Romema. For many years, the neighborhood was situated on Jerusalem's northern border, facing Jordanian strongholds across the valley in present-day Ramot. The main street has always been known as Rechov Panim Meirot (Panim Meirot Street), after the sefer Panim Meirot by Rabbi Meir Eisenshtadt.

=== Austrian ties ===
Akiva Ehrenfeld established close ties with the government of Austria to obtain funding for several institutions, including Neveh Simcha and a kindergarten. Following an official state visit to Israel by Austrian President Thomas Klestil in 1994, which included a side tour of Kiryat Mattersdorf, Klestil hosted Ehrenfeld at an official reception at the Hofburg Palace in Vienna on 24 January 1995.

== Resident profile ==
Most of the inhabitants of Kiryat Mattersdorf identify with the Litvish style of Haredi Judaism. Many are olim from the United States and United Kingdom.

Notable rabbis who live in Kiryat Mattersdorf include Rabbis Zelig Pliskin, Moshe Sacks, Nota Schiller, Chaim Brovender, and Yosef Savitzky. Rabbis Simcha Wasserman, Chaim Pinchas Scheinberg, Mendel Weinbach, and Shlomo Lorincz were long-time residents. Rabbi Yitzchok Yechiel Ehrenfeld, grandson of Shmuel Ehrenfeld and son of Akiva Ehrenfeld, is the Rav of Kiryat Mattersdorf.

== Schools ==
The Torah Ore Yeshiva, founded by Rabbi Chaim Pinchas Scheinberg, and the Chasan Sofer network of schools and Yeshiva, formerly headed by Rabbi Akiva Ehrenfeld, are the major institutions for boys and young men in the neighborhood. Girls' schools include Beis Yaakov of Mattersdorf and the Vizhnitz School for Girls.
