= Meir Arik =

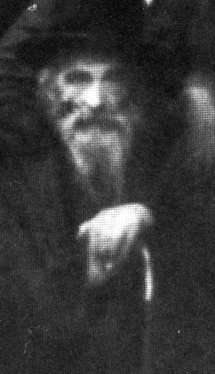
- Meir Arik

Personal life
- Born: 1855
- Died: 1925 (aged 69–70)

Religious life
- Religion: Judaism

Rabbi Meir Arik (1855–1925) was a famous Galician Torah scholar.

== Biography ==
Arik was a talmid of the "Kochav MiYaakov," R. Yaakov Weidenfeld. He was so highly respected by the leading Rabbis of his generation that following the death of Rabbi Schwadron, the Belzer Rav directed all halakhic questions to Rabbi Arik. Rabbi Arik was the posek for the Galician town of Buchach. However, during World War I, Arik fled to the Austrian city of Vienna. Upon his return to Galicia after the war, Arik assumed the post of Chief Rabbi of Tarnów.

In addition to his insights on various tractates of both the Jerusalem and Babylonian Talmud and his halakhic responsa, he also arranged and published a volume with the title of 'Chidushei HaRaMaL' (Kolomye 1890).

In 1912, he was appointed rabbi of Buchach, but with the outbreak of the First World War, in 1914, he fled to Vienna, and on his way he spent six months in Karoli in the apartment of the city's rabbi, Rabbi Shaul Barach. In his escape, he lost five large volumes of questions and answers, the loss of which he deeply regretted. When he returned in 1922 in the summer to Galicia, he was appointed rabbi in Tarnov (Tarna).

== Legacy ==
Arik's students include Rabbi Reuvein Margolies and Rabbi Meir Shapiro who were acknowledged leaders of their generation, as well as Rabbi Zev Wolf Leiter, dayan of Trembovla and later Av Beis Din of Pittsburgh, PA, as well as his nephews, the late Klausenberger Rosh Yeshiva Rabbi Aharon Yehuda Wilner and Rabbi Aharon Yehuda Arik.

Arik's opinions are cited extensively by his contemporaries, as well as later halachic authorities including the Chelkas Yaakov, Kinyan Torah beHalacha, and Mar'eh Yechezkel.

== Written works ==
Arik wrote the following works:

- Tal Torah (טל תורה) on the Babylonian Talmud and Jerusalem Talmud
- Minchas Kena'os (מנחת קנאות) on Tractate Sotah
- Minchas Pittim (מנחת פיתים) on Shulchan Aruch
- Imrei Yosher (Munkacs 5673; c. 1912 CE) - legal responsa covering a wide range of contemporary issues
