= Bayit Lepletot =

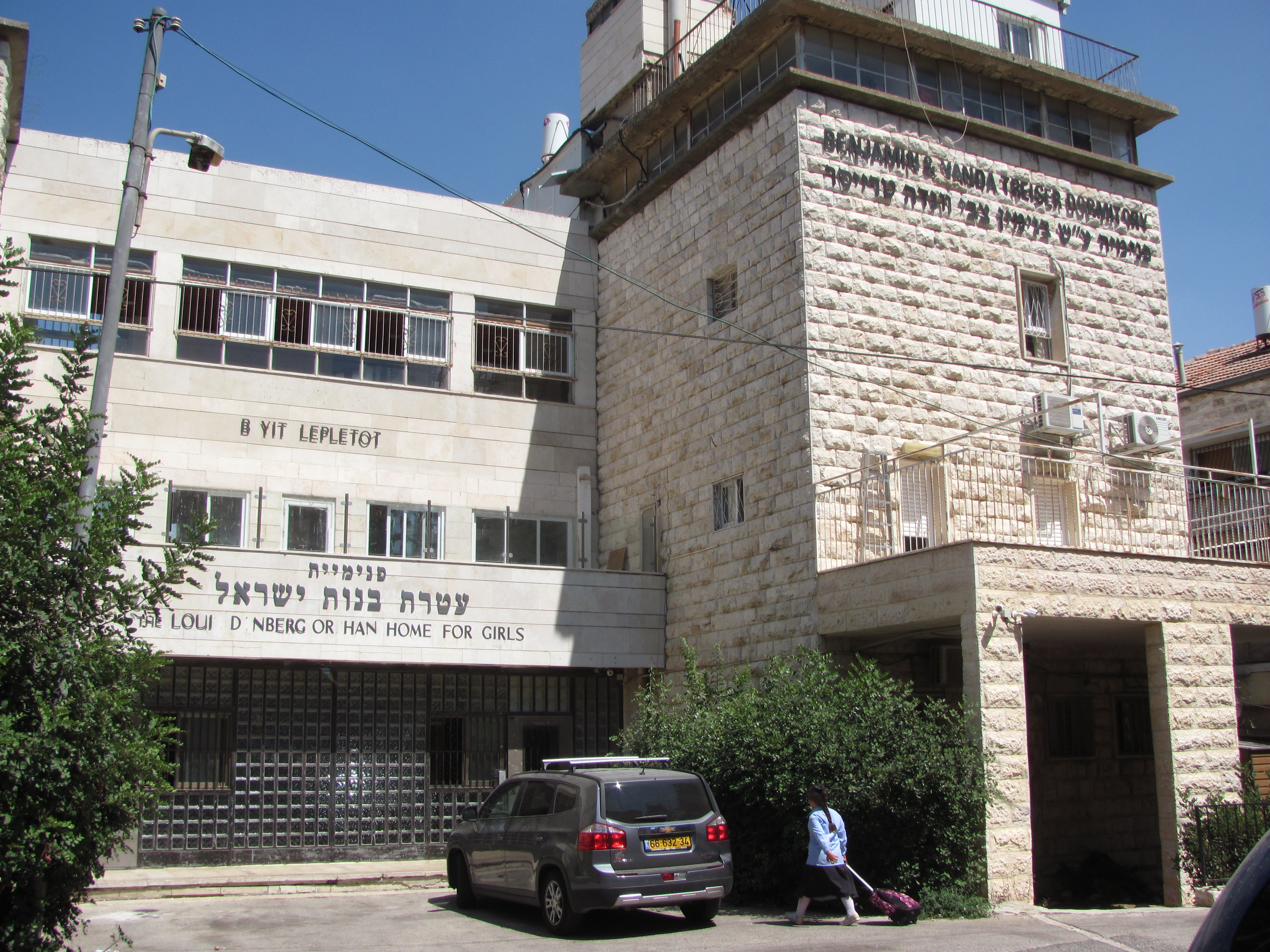
- Bayit Lepletot dormitory buildings
- Formation: 1949
- Founder: Rabbi Naftali Rosenfeld; Rabbii Shlomo Pappenheim; Rabbi Samuel Y. Stern
- Type: Nonprofit
- Purpose: Orphanage for girls
- Headquarters: 1 Baharan Street
- Location: Jerusalem, Israel
- Official language: Hebrew
- Directors: Rabbi Chaim E. Rosenfeld; Rabbi Moshe Yona Rosenfeld
- Website: Blphome.org

Bayit Lepletot (Hebrew: בית לפליטות, literally, "Home for Refugees"), is an Orthodox Jewish orphanage for girls in Jerusalem, Israel. Established in 1949 in the Mea Shearim neighborhood to accommodate young Holocaust refugees and orphans, the orphanage opened a second campus in north-central Jerusalem called Girls Town Jerusalem (Hebrew: קרית בנות, "Kiryat Banot") in 1973. Over time, the resident profile changed to comprise girls from dysfunctional or abusive homes, children of terror victims, and abandoned immigrant children. Girls enter the orphanage as young as three years of age and can remain at the home until their wedding. The orphanage takes full responsibility for each girl's welfare and covers all living, educational, and wedding expenses. As of 2004, the two campuses had housed and educated over 8,000 girls.

== History ==
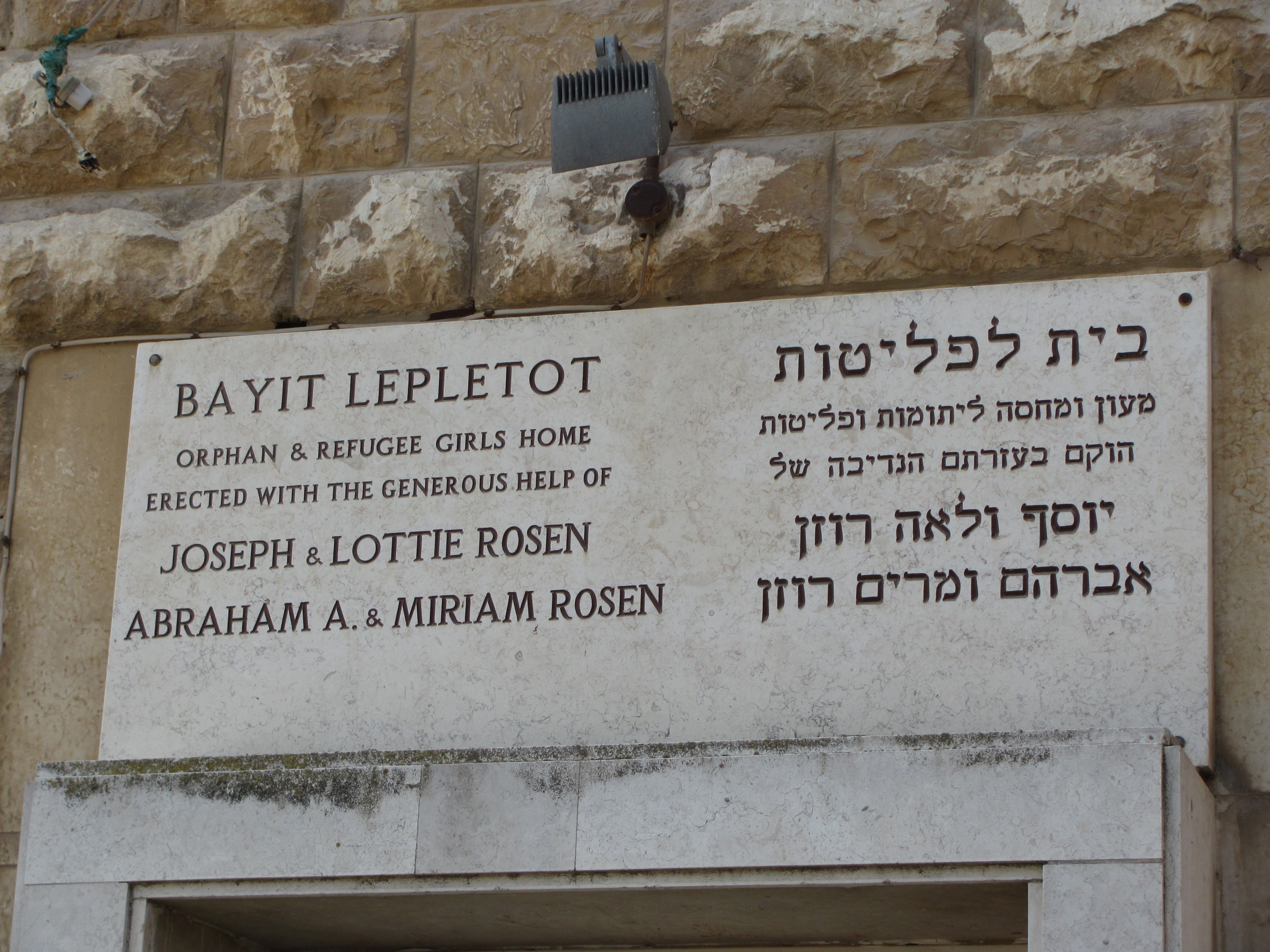
Dedication plaque on the 1959 building

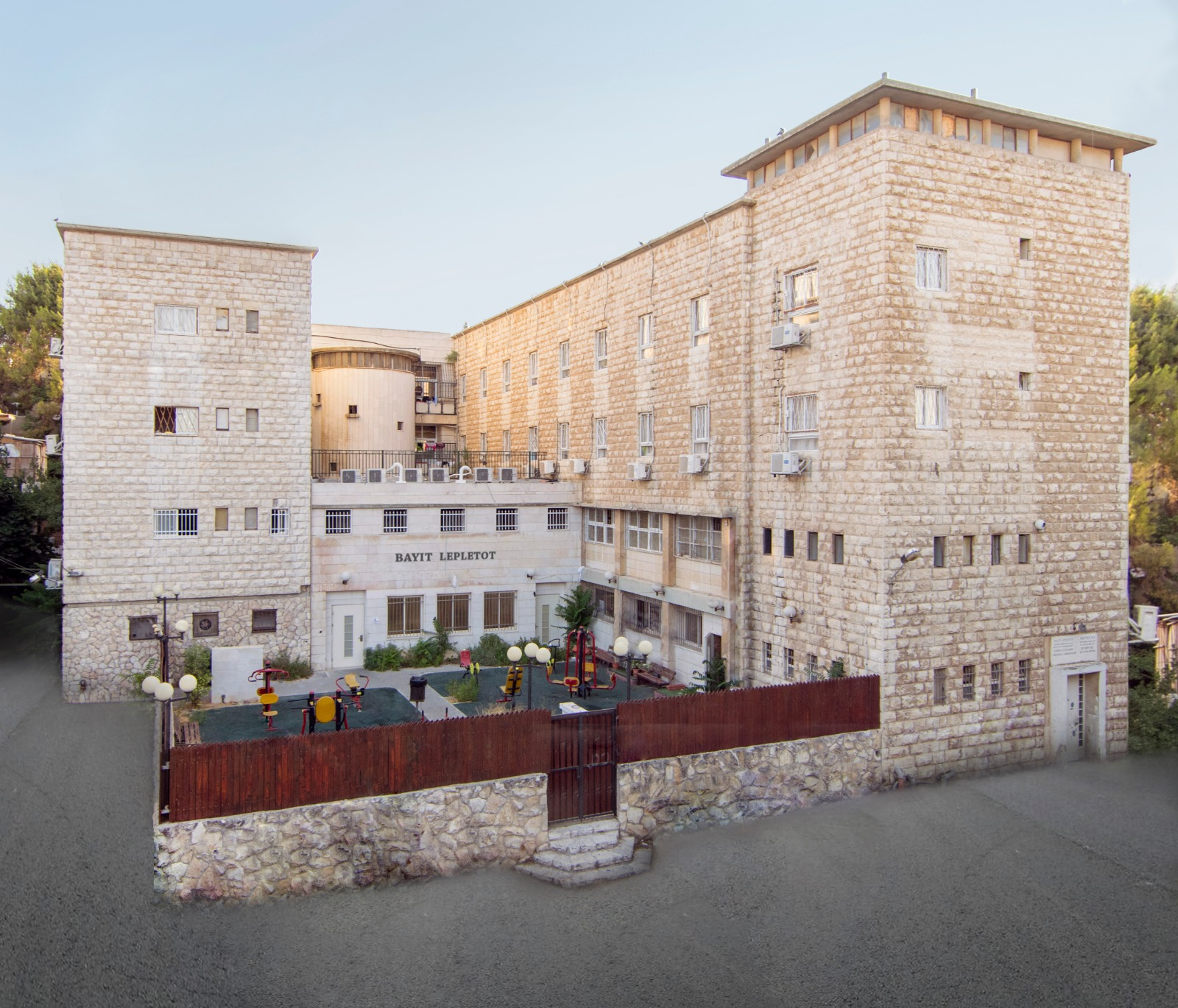
Girls Town Jerusalem campus in north-central Jerusalem

In the postwar years, Israel was flooded with young Holocaust refugees who were being placed in non-religious institutions by the Israeli government. Girls whose parents were unable to cope were also wandering the streets without a framework. The Toldos Aharon Rebbe, Rabbi Aharon Roth, tried to accommodate some of these girls in his own home in Jerusalem. Unable to deal with the economic burden of caring for them, he asked his chassid, Rabbi Naftali Rosenfeld (1914–2012), to take over the undertaking. Rosenfeld, a native of Kleinwardein, Hungary, was a Holocaust survivor whose first wife and three children had been murdered by the Nazis; he made aliyah after the war with his second wife, the daughter of Rabbi Moshe Yona Schlesinger of Hungary. Rosenfeld rented a basement apartment in the Mea Shearim neighborhood of Jerusalem and opened the Bayit Lepletot orphanage in 1949 with an enrollment of seven girls.

While enrollment grew, conditions were difficult. By the early 1950s, Bayit Lepletot housed several dozen girls in two small rooms with a leaky roof and an outdoor toilet shared with a neighboring family. One of the rabbis in the program made a collection every morning in the synagogue and gave the proceeds to the housemother so she could buy that day's main meal. In years to come, the directors would arrange for used clothing to be sent from America.

The operation of the orphanage was also difficult on Rosenfeld's wife, who had also lost her family in the Holocaust and was left alone for long periods to care for their children while her husband was away fund-raising overseas. At one point she and her husband consulted the Belzer Rebbe, Rabbi Aharon Rokeach, who blessed Rosenfeld's wife that she would be able to manage and would merit to raise good Jewish children.

Rabbi Shlomo Pappenheim joined Rosenfeld as a co-director shortly after the home's founding. In 1960 Rabbi Shmuel Yitzchak Stern, an American-born accountant and grandson of Yaakov Yosef Herman, became the third co-director. Both Rosenfeld and Stern worked for the orphanage for over 50 years. Today the sons of the original co-directors fill those roles.

Bayit Lepletot constructed its own building in Mea Shearim in 1959. The original quarters, renamed "The Small Building", continues to accommodate girls from preschool through fifth grade. The home also conducts activities in two neighboring buildings. In 1969 the orphanage purchased land for a second campus in north-central Jerusalem with the aid of a United States government grant. Girls Town Jerusalem opened in 1973 on a hillside below the neighborhood of Unsdorf. The campus, located at 55 Sorotzkin Street, includes a Museum of Jewish Art with collections of Jewish ritual objects.

Rosenfeld also established the Beit Hachlamah convalescent home for new mothers in the Bayit Vegan neighborhood in 1975. In 1987 this institution was moved to larger facilities in Telz-stone.

== Description ==
The profile of girls living at Bayit Lepletot has changed from orphans and refugees to girls from dysfunctional or abusive homes, children of terror victims, and abandoned immigrant children. The orphanage takes full responsibility for each girl's welfare, "acting as both surrogate parent and advocate" to give them the personal and emotional support they need. Girls enter Bayit Lepletot as young as three years of age and can remain at the home until their wedding.

Bayit Lepletot provides both living and educational arrangements, and operates its own school for girls who scholastically lag behind their peers. It also furnishes private tutoring; dance, music, and drama therapy; and vocational training. The summer schedule includes a sleepaway camp. An average of 25 to 30 girls are married each year, with the orphanage providing all their wedding needs.

By 2004, the orphanage had housed and educated nearly 8,000 girls. The two campuses together have capacity for up to 600 residents.

== Directors ==
=== Original co-directors ===
- Rabbi Naftali Rosenfeld
- Rabbi Shlomo Pappenheim
- Rabbi Samuel I. Stern

=== Present-day ===
- Rabbi Moshe Yona Rosenfeld
- Rabbi Chaim E. Rosenfeld
- Rabbi Gavriel Pappenheim
