= Tzvi Hirsch Ferber =

British rabbi

Rabbi Tzvi Hirsch Ferber
- צבי הירש פרבר

Personal life
- Born: 1879 Slabodka, Lithuania
- Died: November 1966 (aged 86–87) London
- Education: Yeshivas Knesses Yisrael (Slabodka)

Religious life
- Religion: Judaism
- Denomination: Orthodox

Jewish leader
- Synagogue: West End Talmud Torah Synagogue
- Main work: Kerem HaTzvi

Tzvi Hirsch Ferber (Hebrew: צבי הירש פרבר; 1879 – November 1966) was a Lithuanian-born British rabbi. A gifted orator, prolific author and Torah scholar, he led the West End Talmud Torah Synagogue in Soho, London.

== Early life ==
Tzvi Hirsch Ferber was born to Shimon Yehuda Leib (died 9 March 1906) and Chana Devorah (died 29 December 1911) Farber (note the spelling) in Slabodka/Kovno in about 1878. The name Tzvi Hirsch is a bilingual tautological name in Yiddish. It means literally "deer-deer" and is traceable back to the Hebrew word צבי tsvi "deer" and the German word Hirsch "deer". Ferber studied in the prestigious Slabodka yeshiva, as well as under such Talmudic and Mussar giants as Yitzchak Elchanan Spektor, Yitzchak Blazer and Naftali Amsterdam. He married Fraida the daughter of Tzvi Yosef Goldberg (died 6 June 1923), great granddaughter of Zev Wolf Lipkin, the Av Beth Din of Goldingen and Telz (the Ben Aryeh, author of glosses on the Talmud & Rishonim; died 18 May 1858) and great niece of Yisrael Salanter Lipkin (died 2 February 1883; Father of the Musar Movement).

== Career ==
Ferber arrived in Manchester, England in 1911, where he founded a yeshiva along with Yehoshua Dov Silverstone. In July 1913, he accepted a call to become Rabbi of the West End Talmud Torah Synagogue in Soho, London, a disorganised community of working-class Jewish immigrants of Eastern European origin. In a short span of time, Ferber successfully centralised the unorganised Jewish activities and religious life of the community into one institution.

Active in communal affairs, Ferber established the Chesed V’emeth Burial Society in 1915. He helped found the London yeshiva and was for many years the honorary secretary of the London "Vaad Harabonim" (rabbinical council) and chairman of the Association of London Rabbis ("Hisachdus Harabonim"). A member of its World Rabbinical council, Ferber gave valuable assistance to the Agudas Yisroel movement. He closely collaborated with Rabbi Drs. M. Jung and V. Schonfeld in Shechita and other communal issues. He was a friend of Avraham Yitzchak Kook, Chief Rabbi of Palestine, from the time that the latter was Rabbi of Machzike Hadath in London.

Ferber was widely respected by his congregation and colleagues. Contemporary accounts described him as a religious leader known for his gentle manner and public speaking. He preached his sermons in Yiddish and was noted for engaging audiences through both emotional and humorous elements.

Ferber was Rabbi of Soho for 42 years, from 1913 until his retirement in 1955. He died in 1966 in London, survived by his son Jacob Ferber and four older daughters.

== Personal life ==
Ferber's eldest daughter Hoda Malka (Eda) married the teacher, editor and poet Chaim Lewis. Eda was an early female marriage counsellor in post war London. Chaim Lewis published the prize-winning memoir 'A Soho Address' (Gollancz, 1965) and several books of poetry and was editor of The Jewish Review periodical in South Africa.

The second daughter Feiga Leah (Fanny) was married to Moshe (Morris) Davidson, Rabbi of the South West London United synagogue, who obtained his smicha from Elyah Lopian at Etz Chaim yeshiva, London.

The third daughter Anne took care of her father in his later years.

The fourth daughter Liba (Lilly) married Shlomo Pesach Toperoff, who first served as Rabbi of Sunderland and then as Rabbi of Newcastle upon Tyne. He authored of many prolific works including Lev Avot, Echod Mi Yodea, Eternal Life a handbook for the mourner, and The Animal Kingdom in Jewish Thought.

== Works ==
Ferber was recognized within the Orthodox Jewish community as a distinguished Torah scholar. A prolific author, he published 22 works of Torah scholarship, among the largest bodies of published rabbinic scholarship produced by a rabbi in England. He also contributed regularly to Hebrew journals and frequently consulted the Hebrew collections of the British Library. While living in London's West End, he was a regular visitor to the Oriental Reading Room of the British Museum.

=== Publications ===
- Kerem HaTzvi – 5 volume work on the Torah (Beraishis, Shemos, Vayikra, Bamidbar and Devarim) and Haggada, Rabbi Ferber's seminal work, issued between 1920 and 1938
- Degel Machane Yehudah – dealing with the influence of some archaeological finds on Torah interpretation (1925)
- Shvil HaTzvi - commentary on Megillas Esther (1933)
- Aishes Chayil - commentary on Aishes Chayil (1934)
- Birur Halacha - on civil marriages and divorce in Jewish law (1937)
- Kiryas Chana David - about King David (1950)
- Sefer Hamo'adim - volume of sermons (1950)
- Hegyonei Tzvi - on the end of days in Judaism (1952)
- Chamudei Tzvi - thoughts on the festivals and special periods of the year (1953)
- Hegyonei Avos - commentary on Pirkei Avos (1954)
- Siach Tzvi - commentary on prayer (1955)
- Kerem HaTorah (1956)
- Zivchei Todah - on Torah, prayer and Pirkei Avos (1957)

His works are now being republished by his descendants.
