= Lauren Tuchman =

American rabbi and disability rights activist

- Born: 1986 (age 39–40)
- Education: Dickinson College, BA; Jewish Theological Seminary of America, MA, Semikhah
- Occupation: Rabbi
- Years active: 2017-
- Employer: Avodah
- Website: https://rabbituchman.com/

Lauren Tuchman (born 1986) is the first blind woman to be ordained as a rabbi. She is notable for her contributions to inclusive Torah and advocacy for disability justice.

== Biography ==
Tuchman was born in 1986, and has been blind since infancy. She was raised in Washington, D.C., in an interfaith family with a secular Jewish father and a Catholic mother. Tuchman was raised Catholic and her mother incorporated Jewish traditions into her upbringing. During her time in the Catholic community, Tuchman experienced several ableist incidents. As a teenager, she began embracing Judaism after encountering a braille siddur. Tuchman formally converted to Judaism as a young adult.

Tuchman attended Dickinson College, where she majored in religion. She later earned a master's degree from the Jewish Theological Seminary of America (JTS). Recognizing a lack of broader inclusion for individuals with disabilities in Jewish spaces, Tuchman decided to pursue rabbinical ordination three years after completing her graduate studies.

She continued her education at JTS for rabbinical school, where she participated in social justice programs, including the Jewish Organizing Institute & Network (JOIN for Justice) training for clergy and the Jews United for Justice Jeremiah Fellowship. She also served as a rabbinic intern for T'ruah. In 2017, she delivered an ELI Talk titled We All Were At Sinai: The Transformative Power of Inclusive Torah.

After her ordination in 2018, Tuchman began working at Avodah, a Jewish service organization, as their Washington, DC–based Rabbi-in Residence. In 2019, she joined JOIN for Justice's board of directors and completed the first cohort of SVARA's Kollel. From 2018 to 2020, Tuchman participated in David Jaffe's Inside Out Wisdom and Action Project, focusing on social justice leadership through Musar, and subsequently began teaching within the program.

Following her ordination in 2018, Tuchman began working at Avodah, a Jewish service organization, as the Washington, DC–based Ruach Rabbi-in Residence. In September 2019, she joined JOIN for Justice's board of directors. Also in 2019, she completed SVARA's Kollel as a part of their first cohort.

Tuchman's work also includes speaking with congregations and consulting with individuals and organizations on access and inclusion and contributes Torah commentary to several resources.

== Theology ==
For many years, Tuchman incorporated Hasidic teachings, particularly those of Kalonymus Kalman Shapira.

== Awards and honors ==
- 2017: The Jewish Week's 36 Under 36
- 2020: Jewish Orthodox Feminist Alliance's Ushpizot
