= Reuven Dov Dessler =

Rabbinic leader

Reuven Dov Dessler (1863–1935) was a rabbinic leader of the Musar movement and the director of the Kelm Talmud Torah from 1918 until 1931.

He was born in 1863 in the city of Liepāja (Libau) in Courland, Latvia. His parents were strong supporters of the Musar movement and especially of the efforts of Rabbi Simcha Zissel Ziv, who directed a yeshiva known as the Kelm Talmud Torah. In 1874, at the age of eleven, Reuven Dov became a student at the Talmud Torah, and he remained a student there as a student of Ziv for many years.

While continuing to study at the Talmud Torah, Reuven Dov also took a position in the timber industry. In 1891, he married Hene Freidel Grodznsky, the daughter of Rabbi Eliyahu Eliezer Grodzensky and granddaughter of Rabbi Yisroel Lipkin Salanter, the father of the Musar movement. They had a son, Eliyahu Eliezer Dessler. Hene Freidel died in 1895. Reuven Dov later remarried to Frume Rochel Rabinovitch, the daughter of Rabbi Ya'akov Rabinovitch of Telsiai. Frume Rochel died in a terrible domestic accident in December, 1922.

In 1918, Reuven Dov became the director of the Kelm Talmud Torah, a position he held until 1931.

In 1931, he moved to London, where his son Eliyahu Eliezer was living. Reuven Dov died in 1935.
