= Musar literature =

Jewish ethical works emphasizing virtue

Musar literature is Jewish ethical and didactic literature which describes virtues and vices and the path towards character improvement. This literature gives the name to the Musar movement in 19th-century Lithuania, but this article considers such literature more broadly.

== Definition ==
Musar literature is often described as "ethical literature". Geoffrey Claussen describes it as "Jewish literature that discusses virtue and character." Isaiah Tishby and Joseph Dan have described it as "prose literature that presents to a wide public views, ideas, and ways of life in order to shape the everyday behavior, thought, and beliefs of this public." Musar literature traditionally depicts the nature of moral and spiritual perfection methodically. It is "divided according to the component parts of the ideal righteous way of life; the material is treated methodically – analyzing, explaining, and demonstrating how to achieve each moral virtue (usually treated in a separate chapter or section) in the author's ethical system."

Musar literature can be distinguished from other forms of Jewish ethical literature, such as aggadic narrative and halakhic literature.

== Early Musar literature ==
Ethical monotheism originated in early Judaism, and along with it came the highly didactic ethics in the Torah and later works.

Mishlei is commonly regarded as a musar classic in its own right and is arguably the first true sefer musar. In fact, the Hebrew word musar (מוסר, 'discipline'), being the eponymous name for the literature, stems from the term's extensive use in the biblical book.

An example from the Tanakh is the earliest known text of the positive form of the famous "Golden Rule":

You shall not take vengeance or bear a grudge against your kinsfolk. Love your neighbor as yourself: I am the LORD.

— Leviticus 19:18

Hillel the Elder (c. 110 BCE – 10 CE) taught the verse as the most important of the Torah. Once, he was challenged by a ger toshav who asked to be converted under the condition that the Torah be explained to him while he stood on one foot. Hillel accepted him as a candidate for conversion to Judaism, but, drawing on Leviticus 19:18, briefed the man:

What is hateful to you, do not do to your fellow: this is the whole Torah; the rest is the explanation; go and learn.

— Shabbath folio:31a, Babylonian Talmud

Pirkei Avot is a compilation of Jewish ethics and related teachings the Rabbis of the Mishnaic period and part of didactic Jewish ethical musar literature. Because of its contents, it is also called Ethics of the Fathers. The teachings of Pirkei Avot appear in the Mishnaic tractate Avot, the second-to-last tractate in the order of Nezikin in the Mishnah. Pirkei Avot is unique in that it is the only tractate of the Mishnah dealing solely with ethical and moral principles; there is little halakha found in Pirkei Avot.

== Medieval period ==
Medieval works of Musar literature were composed by a range of rabbis and others, including rationalist philosophers and adherents of Kabbalistic mysticism. Joseph Dan has argued that medieval Musar literature reflects four different approaches: the philosophical approach; the standard rabbinic approaches; the approach of Chassidei Ashkenaz; and the Kabbalistic approach.

Tikkun Middot ha-Nefesh-The Improvement of the Moral Qualities, by Solomon Ibn Gabirol, Hebrew version 1167. 1869 edition

Philosophical works of Musar include:

- Chovot ha-Levavot by Bahya ibn Paquda
- Hilchot Deot in Sefer ha-Madah of Mishneh Torah by Maimonides
- Sefer Hayashar (the ethical work, not to be confused with the many other unrelated works of the same name), published anonymously
- Shemona Perakim ("The Eight Chapters"):, the introduction to Pirkei Avot in Maimonides' commentary to the Mishnah.

Orchot Tzaddikim-The Ways of the Righteous, anonymous author. First Hebrew edition, Prague 1581

Rabbinic Musar literature came as a reaction to philosophical literature, and tried to show that the Torah and standard rabbinic literature taught about the nature of virtue and vice without recourse to Aristotelian or other philosophical concepts. Classic works of this sort include

- Ma'alot ha-Middot by Rabbi Yehiel ben Yekutiel Anav of Rome
- Shaarei Teshuvah (The Gates of Repentance) by Rabbi Yonah Gerondi
- Menorat ha-Ma'or by Israel Al-Nakawa b. Joseph of Toledo
- Menorat ha-Ma'or by Isaac Aboab
- Orchot Tzaddikim (The Ways of the Righteous), by an anonymous author
- Meneket Rivkah by Rebecca bat Meir Tiktiner

Similar works were produced by rabbis who were Kabbalists but whose Musar writings did not bear a kabbalistic character: Nahmanides' Sha'ar ha-Gemul, which focuses on various categories of just and wicked people and their punishments in the world to come; and Rabbi Bahya ben Asher's Kad ha-Kemah.

Chassidei Ashkenaz (literally "the Pious of Germany") was a Jewish movement in the 12th century and 13th century founded by Rabbi Judah the Pious (Rabbi Yehuda HeChassid) of Regensburg, Germany, which was concerned with promoting Jewish piety and morality. The most famous work of Musar literature produced by this school was The Book of the Pious (Sefer Hasidim).

Explicitly Kabbalistic mystical works of Musar literature include Tomer Devorah (The Palm Tree of Deborah) by Moses ben Jacob Cordovero, Reshit Chochmah by Eliyahu de Vidas, and Kav ha-Yashar by Tzvi Hirsch Kaidanover.

== Modern period ==
Literature in the genre of Musar literature continued to be written by modern Jews from a variety of backgrounds.

=== Mesillat Yesharim ===
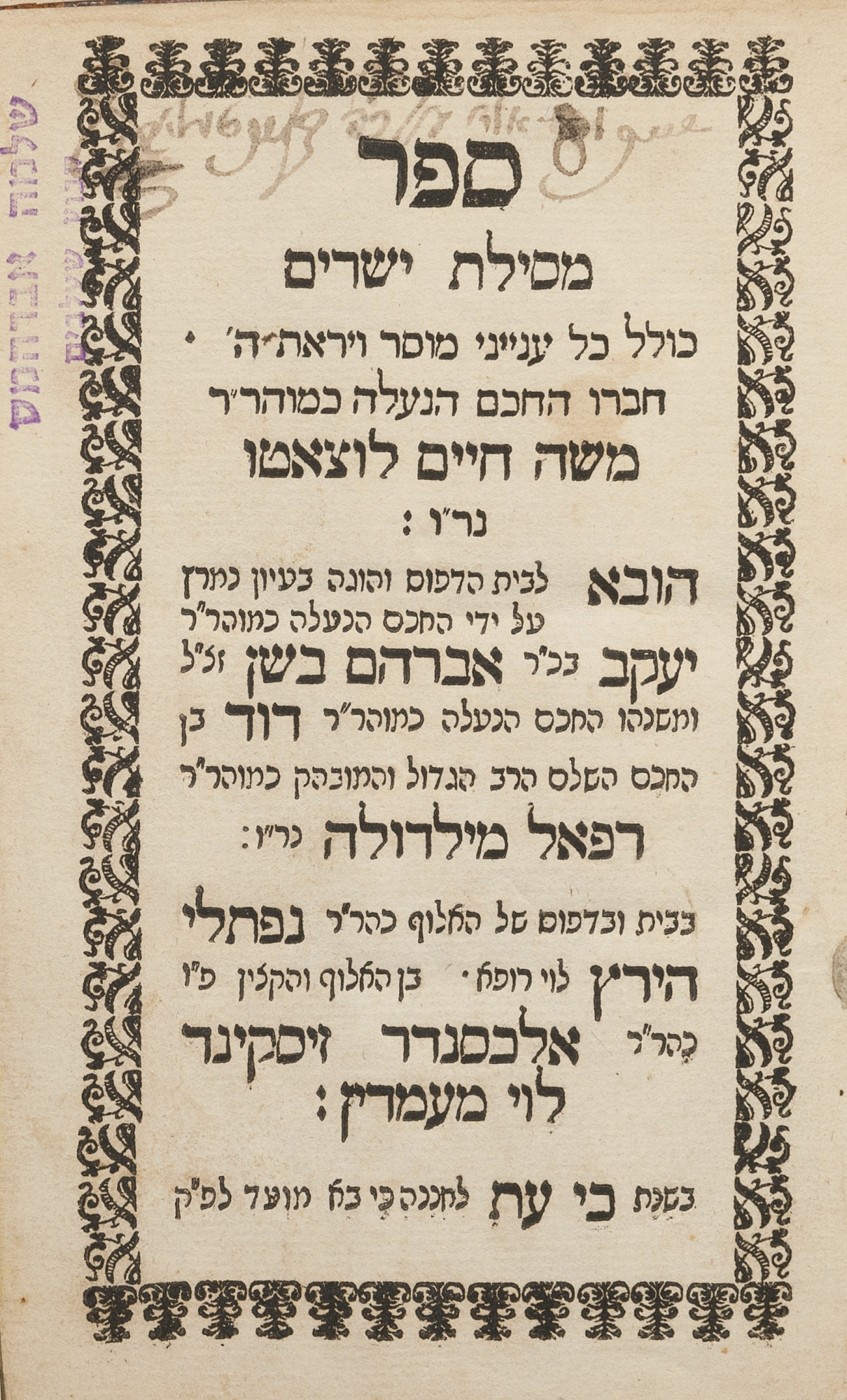
Mesilat Yesharim (Path of the Just): cover page

Mesillat Yesharim is a Musar text published in Amsterdam by Moshe Chaim Luzzatto in the 18th century. It is perhaps the most important work of Musar literature of the post-medieval period. The Vilna Gaon commented that he could not find a superfluous word in the first seven chapters of the work and stated that he would have traveled to meet the author and learn from his ways if he'd still been alive.

=== Ottoman ===
According to Julia Phillips Cohen, summarizing the work of Matthias B. Lehmann on Musar literature in Ottoman Sephardic society:

Beginning in the eighteenth century, a number of Ottoman rabbis had undertaken the task of fighting the ignorance they believed was plaguing their communities by producing works of Jewish ethics (musar) in Judeo-Spanish (also known as Ladino). This development was inspired in part by a particular strain within Jewish mysticism (Lurianic Kabbalah) which suggested that every Jew would necessarily play a role in the mending of the world required for redemption. The spread of ignorance among their coreligionists thus threatened to undo the proper order of things. It was with this in mind that these Ottoman rabbis--all capable of publishing in the more highly esteemed Hebrew language of their religious tradition--chose to write in their vernacular instead. While they democratized rabbinic knowledge by translating it for the masses, these "vernacular rabbis" (to use Matthias Lehmann's term) also attempted to instill in their audiences the sense that their texts required the mediation of individuals with religious training. Thus, they explained that common people should gather together to read their books in meldados, or study sessions, always with the guidance of someone trained in the study of Jewish law.

Among the most popular works of Musar literature produced in Ottoman society was Elijah ha-Kohen's Shevet Musar, first published in Ladino in 1748. Pele Yoetz by Rabbi Eliezer Papo (1785–1826) was another exemplary work of this genre.

=== Haskalah ===
In Europe, leaders of the Haskalah made significant contributions to Musar literature. Naphtali Hirz Wessely wrote a Musar text titled Sefer Ha-Middot (Book of Virtues) in approximately 1786. Menachem Mendel Lefin of Satanov wrote a text titled Cheshbon Ha-Nefesh (Moral Accounting) in 1809, based in part on the ethical program described in the autobiography of Benjamin Franklin.

=== Hasidic ===
One form of literature in the Hasidic movement was tracts collecting and instructing mystical-ethical practices. These include Tzavaat HaRivash ("Testament of Rabbi Yisroel Baal Shem") and Tzetl Koton by Elimelech of Lizhensk, a seventeen-point program on how to be a good Jew. Rabbi Nachman of Breslov's Sefer ha-Middot is a Hasidic classic of Musar literature.

=== Mitnagdic and Yeshivish ===
The "Musar letter" of the Vilna Gaon, an ethical will by an opponent of the Hasidic movement, is regarded by some as a classic of Musar literature. Many of the writings of Yisrael Meir Kagan have also been described as Musar literature.

=== Literature by the Musar movement ===
The modern Musar movement, beginning in the 19th century, encouraged the organized study of medieval Musar literature to an unprecedented degree while producing its own Musar literature. Significant Musar writings were made by leaders of the movement, such as Rabbis Israel Salanter, Simcha Zissel Ziv, Yosef Yozel Horwitz, and Eliyahu Dessler. The movement established musar learning as a regular part of the curriculum in the Lithuanian Yeshiva world, acting as a bulwark against contemporary forces of secularism.

=== By Reform rabbis ===
Musar literature has been composed by Reform rabbis including Ruth Abusch-Magder, noted for her writing on humility, and Karyn Kedar, noted for her writing on forgiveness.

=== By Conservative rabbis ===
Musar literature has been composed by Conservative rabbis, including Amy Eilberg (noted for her writing on curiosity and courage) and Danya Ruttenberg (noted for her writing on curiosity). Rabbi Ira F. Stone, founder of the Center for Contemporary Mussar, is the author of _A Responsible Life; Thje Spiritual Path of Mussar_, as well as a commentary on the classic Mussar texts Mesillat Yesharim and Tomer Devorah.

=== By Reconstructionist rabbis ===
Musar literature has been composed by Reconstructionist rabbis, including Susan Schnur (noted for her writing on forgiveness), Sandra Lawson (noted for her writing on curiosity), Rebecca Alpert (noted for her writing on humility), and Mordecai Kaplan (noted for his writing on humility). Schnur's writings show how gender matters in discussion of forgiveness as a virtue.
