= Kovno Kollel =

Jewish educational institution in Kaunas, Lithuania

Coordinates: 54°54′30″N 23°53′30″E

Kollel Perushim
- קולל פרושים
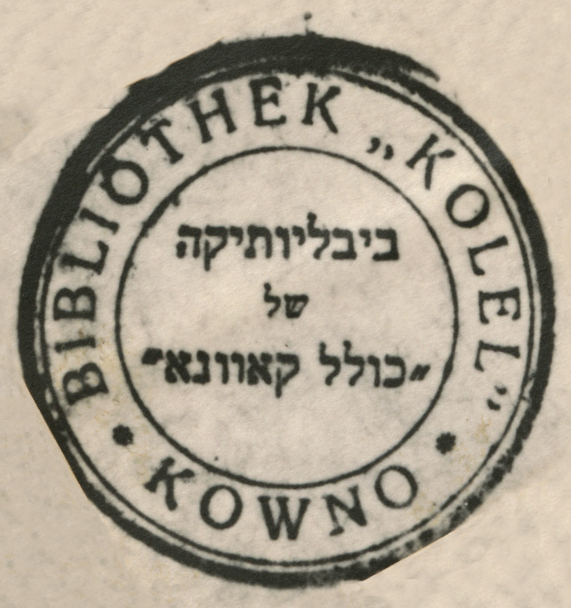
- Library book stamp, Kovno Kollel Library
- Other names: Kovno Kollel
- Type: Kollel
- Active: 1877–1941
- Founders: Rabbi Israel Salanter
- Affiliations: Orthodox Judaism, Musar
- Rosh Kollel: Rabbi Yitzchak Elchanan Spektor, Rabbi Zvi Hirsh Rabinowitz, Rabbi Yitzchak Blazer, Rabbi Shimon Zvi Dubiansky
- Location: Kaunas, Lithuania

Kovno Kollel (Lithuanian: Kauno kolelis) also known as Kollel Perushim of Kovno or Kollel Knesses Beis Yitzchok, was a kollel located in Kaunas, Lithuania. It was founded in 1877 by Rabbi Yisrael Lipkin Salanter when he was 67.

Kovno Kollel's purpose was the furtherance of hora'ah (expertise in deciding matters of Jewish law) and musar - by supporting and guiding exceptional Torah scholars in their development as authorities.

== History ==
In 1877, Rabbi Yisroel ben Ze’ev Wolf Lipkin – also known as Yisroel Salanter – founded a Kollel (a yeshiva for young, mostly married, men) in the city of Kaunes (Kovno), Lithuania.

The Kollel taught the non-Hasidic Orthodox Musar movement (of which Lipkin was the founder) that sought to emphasize ethical conduct and spiritual devotion.

The project was approved by, and eventually named for, Yitzchak Elchanan Spektor, the rabbi of Kovno.

When the Nazis invaded and occupied Kovno, the Kollel students were murdered like most of the city's Jewish residents.

== Innovations ==
Until 1877, yeshivas only subsidized students until they got married (at an early age). Rabbi Salanter instituted the practice of paying a small salary to married students to continue their advanced Talmudical studies. He defended this innovation because he said that he was training leaders. His argument was that the need for well-trained communal leaders mandated this drastic action. The justification was that these individuals would eventually serve the community, and it was not that because they sat and learned that they should be supported.

By 1877–1878, ten scholars had begun their full-time studies, following a curriculum which included the study of musar literature. In 1879, Rabbi Spektor became its head. Rabbi Nosson Tzvi Finkel served as the mashgiach of the kollel. Rabbi Spektor's son, Rabbi Zvi Hirsh Rabinowitz accepted the administrative responsibilities and was one of the roshei kollel (heads of the kollel), while Rabbi Avrohom Shenker and Rabbi Finkel conducted the internal affairs. Under the latter's guidance, the book Eitz Pri was published, featuring essays by Rabbis Salanter and Spektor - including a foreword by the then lesser-known Rabbi Yisroel Meir HaKohen (the "Chafetz Chaim").

In 1880, Finkel left the kollel so he could devote himself to establishing more kollelim throughout Eastern Europe. In 1880, Spektor also left the Kollel, and Salanter's student Yitzchak Blazer became its new head. Under Blazer's direction, the kollel came to be "considered by its contemporaries as a bastion of the Mussar movement," and was attacked by the Mussar movement's opponents.

The Kovno Kollel was later transferred to Slabodka, a suburb of Kovno, where Rabbi Shimon Zvi Dubiansky was appointed rosh kollel and served there until the outbreak of World War II.

== Notable chavrei kollel (Kollel members) ==
- Rabbi Yosef Yozel Horwitz
- Rabbi Yaakov Kamenetsky
- Rabbi Dovid Leibowitz
- Rabbi Chaim Rabinowitz
- Rabbi Shmuel Leib Svei (father of Rabbi Elya Svei)
- Rabbi Aharon Shmuel Tamares

== See also ==
- Yitzchak Isaac Sher#Slabodka Kollel
