= Aaron Samuel Tamares =

European Rabbi (1869-1931)

Rabbi Aaron Samuel Tamares
- הרב אהרן שמואל בן משה יעקב תמרת
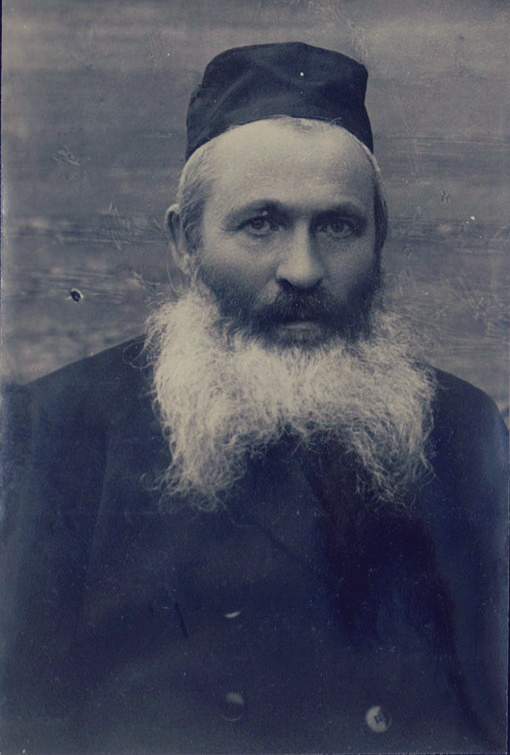
- Aaron Samuel Tamares

Personal life
- Born: 1869 Grodno, Belarus
- Died: 10 August 1931 (aged 61–62) Milejczyce, Poland
- Spouse: Rachel
- Children: Miriam, Zirka, Shlomo, David, Hannah, Rivkah Perelis
- Parent: Moshe Ya'akov Tamares (father)
- Education: Kovno Kollel, Volozhin Yeshiva
- Other name: Aḥad ha-Rabanim ha-Margishim
- Occupation: Rabbi

Religious life
- Religion: Judaism

Jewish leader
- Position: Chief Rabbi of Milejczyce
- Yeshiva: Volozhin Yeshiva, Kovno Kollel
- Began: 1893

Aaron Samuel Tamares (Hebrew: אהרן שמואל תמרת, Aharon Shmuel Tamares, sometimes Tamaret; 1869–1931) was an Ashkenazi Orthodox Rabbi, author, and philosopher, most notable for voicing a pacifist opposition to the mainstream Zionist movement. He often wrote under the pen name Aḥad ha-Rabanim ha-Margishim ("one of the feeling rabbis").

== Biography ==
=== Early life ===
Tamares was born in 1869 in a shtetl called Malech, in Grodno, within the Pale of Settlement. His father, Moshe Ya'akov Tamares, owned a tavern and was the grandson of a well-known tzadik known as Maltsher Preacher, Reb Arehle. He began studying in the cheder from a young age, and soon became regarded as a prodigy. At the age of 19, he left to study in Kovno at the famed Kollel Perushim, followed by two years at the Volozhin Yeshiva.

=== Marriage and children ===
He was originally set to marry the eldest daughter of the Chief Rabbi of Milejczyce, but she unexpectedly died before the marriage went through. He instead married her younger sister, Rachel, at the age of 17, with whom he would go on to have six children. Three of his children would ultimately immigrate to Mandatory Palestine, while the other three were killed in Treblinka after his death. His children, including daughters, were highly educated in the Bible, Mishnah, and even Talmud.

=== Career ===
In 1893, he replaced his father in law as the Chief Rabbi of Milejczyce, which is a position he would retain throughout his life. Tamares was an early defender of Zionism, standing against the prevailing Haredi opposition. In 1900, he was an elected delegate at the fourth Zionist Congress in London. There, he seemingly became disillusioned with the movement. In 1905, Hayim Nahman Bialik and S. Boriskhin published his Sefer ha-yahadut veha-ḥerut, which argued for a justice-centered Judaism and against what he viewed as a non-Jewish nationalism that was dominant in the movement. He continued to write for the next decades, both in his own books as well as in journals and newspapers like HaMelitz and Ha-Tsfira. In 1912, he was invited by Chaim Tchernowitz to take over the latter's yeshiva in Odesa, although he declined the offer because of his aversion to urban living.

=== Death ===
Tamares died on 10 August 1931 at the age of 62, and was eulogized by the Jewish Telegraphic Agency as a "champion of Zionism and of world peace." A Los Angeles-based Jewish newspaper, the B'nai Brith Messenger, adapted the JTA wire story at his death and claimed that he was "the first Zionist rabbi," "a well known Hebraic authority," and a "writer of considerable note" who "ardently advocated the cause of international peace." It also erroneously referred to him an "active leader of Reform in Poland."

== Philosophical and political views ==
Tamares was most well known for his criticisms of mainstream Zionism along several different fronts:

=== Pacifism ===
From a young age, Tamares was sharply critical of the glamorization of violence and militarism. As a child, he railed against portraits of soldiers being on display in the home. In kollel, he was noted for his anti-war preaching, arguing that war consisted of "taking people from their homes, against their will, and setting them in front of the firing cannons [...] This is the pinnacle of dread against which a special struggle must be initiated." This belief in particular became essential to his system in the years following World War I and the destruction that that wrought on Europe and on European Jewry in particular. This commitment to non-violence included a general opposition to violent revolution.

=== Anti-Marxism ===
While Tamares was certainly sympathetic to socialist ideas, especially their anti-war tendency, he gradually came to harshly oppose Marxism. This was both for the pacifist reasons mentioned above as well as for more abstract reasons. He argued that "Marxism was a food that was too dry, he desired a socialism of the heart, not a socialism of numbers" and that it "sought to replace one ruling class for another."

=== Anti-nationalism ===
Tamares offered a radical Jewish critique of nationalism, going well beyond other Satmar-style anti-Zionism. He opposed national projects not merely out of a concern for the Messianic implications of Jewish autonomy in Palestine, but out of a broader political-theological concern. He argued that even the great Kings of Israel and Judah, such as David and Solomon, being monarchs, underwent a sort of spiritual corruption. The Destruction of the Temples, then, offered an opportunity to overcome statist illusions and shift Judaism into a personal religion, which had greater potential than that of the First Commonwealth.

=== The Role of Exile ===
Tamares argued that the long Galut, or Jewish exile and dispersion to the diaspora, had a necessary rectifying effect on the Jewish People. The Medieval and Modern worlds had created spiritual hardships of war and nationalism. The Jews, in their powerlessness, were spared from having to wield violence or act as national players on the world stage. In their victimization, they also were meant to learn what it means to be oppressed and the great need for universal social justice and peace. Jews, he argued, had a greater freedom in statelessness to maintain their moral compass and reject corrupting influence. Thus, secular aims to "force the end" missed the whole point.

=== Two Kinds of Evil ===
Tamares distinguishes between two kinds of evil. The first of these is a natural inclination, an "animal urge," to do violence in a moment of passion, knowing it is wrong. Another, more insidious evil, comes from the corrupting influence of a corrupt society. When one is engaged in the latter, not only is one more likely to commit immoral acts, they will be unable to see that such acts are immoral. Such evil "walks upright in the streets of the city and struts about without meeting any opposition."

== Published works ==
- Ha-yahadut veha-ḥerut (Odesa,1905) [lit. "Judaism and Freedom"]
- Musar ha-Torah veha-yahadut (Vilnius, 1912) [lit. "Torah Musar and Judaism"]
- Ha-emunah ha-tehorah veha-dat ha-hamonit (Odesa, 1912; Jerusalem, 2025) [lit. "The Pure Faith and the Mass Religion"]
- Keneset Yisra’el u-milḥamot ha-goyim (Warsaw,1920; Jerusalem, 2021) [lit. "The Congregation of Israel and the Wars of the Gentiles"]
- Yad Aharon (Piotrków Trybunalski,1923) [lit. "The Hand of Aaron"]
- Sheloshah zivugim bilti hagunim (Piotrków Trybunalski, 1930) [lit. "Three Indecent Pairings"]
- Patsifism l'or ha-tora (Jerusalem, 1992) [lit. "Pacifism in Light of the Torah"]
- Tohu va-bohu (edited by Isaac Slater, Jerusalem, 2022)
- A Passionate Pacifist: Essential Writings of Aaron Samuel Tamares (edited/translated by Everett Gendler, Teaneck, 2023)

== See also ==
- Everett Gendler — Translated Tamares' essential writings to English
- Shaul Magid — His book The Necessity of Exile is partially inspired by the writings of Tamares
- Abraham Yehudah Khein — A Chabad Rabbi who outlined a similar religious-pacifist critique of mainstream Zionism
- Joel Teitelbaum — Noted for a similar exposition of the significance of exilic life and a resultant opposition to Zionist ideas
- Daniel Boyarin —A contemporary scholar who promotes non-statist diasporic life as preferable to Zionism
- Yehuda Ashlag
- Menachem Froman
- Abraham Isaac Kook
