= Simcha Zissel Ziv =

One of the foremost students of Yisrael Salanter

Rabbi Simcha Zissel Ziv
- שמחה זיסל זיו

Personal life
- Born: Simcha Mordechai Ziskind Broida; 1824 Kelmė, Raseiniai County, Kovno Governorate, Russian Empire (present-day Lithuania)
- Died: July 26, 1898 (aged 73–74) Kelmė
- Spouse: Sara Leah
- Children: Nochum Zev Ziv
- Parent(s): Yisroel Broida and Chaya Ziv
- Known for: Founder and director of the Kelm Talmud Torah
- Other name: Alter of Kelm
- Occupation: Rabbi, Musar movement leader

Religious life
- Religion: Judaism
- Denomination: Orthodox

Senior posting
- Students: Yeruchom Levovitz, Nosson Tzvi Finkel, Reuven Dov Dessler, Nachum Ze'ev Ziv, Zvi Hirsch Braude

Simcha Zissel Ziv Broida (Hebrew: שמחה זיסל זיו, Lithuanian: Simča Ziselis Zivas; 1824–1898), also known as Simhah Zissel Ziv or the Alter of Kelm (the Elder of Kelmė), was one of the foremost students of Yisrael Salanter and one of the early leaders of the Musar movement. He is best known as the founder and director of the Kelm Talmud Torah.

== Early life ==
Simcha Zissel Ziv was born as Simcha Mordechai Ziskind Broida in 1824 in Kelmė. His father, Yisroel, belonged to the well-known Lithuanian Braude family. His mother, Chaya, was a descendant of Zvi Ashkenazi, "the Chacham Tzvi". Chaya's family name was Ziv, and her son took on his mother's family name when he moved to Grobin in 1880.

Ziv married Sara Leah, the daughter of Mordechai of Vidzh, a small town near Kelmė. Following his marriage he travelled to Kaunas, where he studied under his foremost mentor, Yisrael Salanter, the founder of the Musar movement, at the Nevyozer Kloiz. Among the other outstanding students were Yitzchak Blazer, and Naftali Amsterdam. Ziv established himself as one of Salanter’s closest disciples and Ziv devoted his life to furthering Salanter’s teachings.

During this time, Salanter sent Ziv to Zhagory, to strengthen the Beis HaMusar (Musar study house), which had been established there. He also delivered lectures in the town of Kretinga.

At the time, Kalman Zev Wissotzky (who later became famous as a tea magnate) was another of Salanter’s students living in Zhagory. Wissotzky had studied in the Volozhin Yeshiva and had become very wealthy and had many connections within government circles. He was a great supporter and benefactor of many Jewish causes. When Wissotsky decided to move to Moscow, Salanter instructed Ziv to accompany him, out of concern that the move to Moscow might have a negative effect on Wissotzky’s spirituality. Ziv then moved to Moscow, where he lived for two years.

Following his time in Moscow, Ziv moved to St. Petersburg, then the largest city in Czarist Russia. After spending almost a year there, the communal leaders brought Ziv a signed document appointing him as their Rabbi. He was unwilling to accept the position, however, and proposed that his friend from the yeshiva in Kaunas – Yitzchak Blazer – be appointed to the position.

== Kelm Talmud Torah ==
Seeking to combat threats to traditional Judaism and to strengthen the cause of the Musar movement, Ziv decided to open a school in Kelmė, the Kelm Talmud Torah. At the time, Ziv was almost forty years old.

The Talmud Torah opened in approximately 1865 and attracted young students, mainly thirteen and fourteen-year-olds. Ziv’s teacher – Yisrael Salanter – had taught Ziv the importance of Musar and so the Talmud Torah aimed not only to enhance its student’s Torah knowledge but also to shape their personalities and develop their character traits using the Musar approach. Indeed, much of daily study at the Talmud Torah focused on Musar, while comparatively little time was devoted to the conventional study of Talmud.

Ziv also introduced general subjects such as geography, mathematics, and Russian into the Talmud Torah curriculum. These subjects were studied for three hours a day, which was unprecedented in traditional Lithuanian yeshivas. Ziv did not view general studies as a "necessary evil" but rather argued that such studies would encourage "better living" and "a better understanding of religious teachings as well."

In 1872, Ziv purchased a plot of land and erected a building for the Talmud Torah. A few years later, however, in 1876, the Talmud Torah was denounced to the authorities, who began to watch it closely and to hound it. Ziv decided to open elsewhere, and re-established in Grobin, in the Kurland province. He arranged for the purchase of a fine building, situated in a spacious yard. There was a main study hall, smaller rooms for classes, a dining room and dormitories. The school in Grobin opened by 1880.

Ziv suffered from failing health which necessitated his spending long periods in his home, which was in Kelmė. In 1881, he returned to Kelmė, leaving his son, Nochum Zev Ziv to run the Talmud Torah in Grobin. Young men from Kelmė and the surrounding areas flocked to study under Ziv and the town once again became a center of Musar.

From his home in Kelmė, Ziv continued to play a role in the running of the Talmud Torah in Grobin. This, however, began to be too difficult and Ziv decided to close the yeshiva. He sent a member of his family to consult his teacher, Salanter, who was living in Germany at the time.

Salanter disagreed with the idea and the Talmud Torah remained open in Grobin until 1886. In that year, Ziv's health took a turn for the worse and his doctors warned him that there was real danger to his life if he continued making the effort that the running of the yeshiva in Grobin required. At this point, Ziv was forced to close the Talmud Torah in Grobin.

With the closure of the Grobin Talmud Torah, the focus of his work shifted back to Kelmė, which now regained its former prominence. Ziv established a group that was known as "Devek Tov," comprising his foremost students. He shared a special relationship with the group's members and he worked on writing out his discourses for them, which, unfortunately, required more strength than he had.

A number of his students settled in Palestine in 1892, opening the "Beis HaMusar" in Jerusalem, under Ziv’s auspices and with his support.

Ziv died on Wednesday, 26 July 1898.

== Personality ==
Ziv was known for his humility, lovingkindness, thoughtfulness, and focus on order.

At Ziv's funeral, his friend and colleague Eliezer Gordon, the rabbi and Rosh Yeshiva of Telšiai, said that aside from Ziv’s greatness in Torah, he had never heard a single word from him that was not related to Torah and to fear of Heaven.

Ziv was not only great in Musar but also in his knowledge of Torah and Talmud. Gordon, who was known as a fiery and tempestuous genius, would repeat his Talmudic thoughts to Ziv and seek his opinion on them, for he valued Ziv’s scholarship highly. Gordon said that his friend had been fluent in three orders of the Talmud, to such a level where he knew every comment of Rashi and Tosafot word for word. He was also fluent in all four divisions of the Shulchan Aruch and could locate any given Halacha within it with pinpoint precision.

== Musar approach ==
Ziv taught that the whole world is a classroom where one can learn to improve one’s character and increase one’s belief in God. Ziv would frequently quote Socrates, who said that "true wisdom is in knowing you know nothing."

Ziv offered his students the following advice: "Take time. Be exact. Unclutter the mind." The school (Talmud Torah) that he operated in Grobin was an epitome of this approach. The students conducted themselves with calmness and order but were still motivated and enthusiastic. There are numerous anecdotes that illustrated the extent that this reached, among them are:

- A man once left a cane hanging on a hook in the school by mistake; he came back many years later and the cane had not been moved.
- Ziv once came into the school and saw that in the row of galoshes that had been lined up outside the study hall, one of the pair of galoshes was not in line with the others. Ziv dedicated an entire ethical sermon to the need for order in light of this event.
- The windows that faced the street in the study hall were never opened in order to prevent distractions. A noise was once heard outside the study hall. One of the students opened the window and looked out to see what was happening. Ziv commented that he did not see that there was any possibility that that student would become an accomplished person.

Ziv explained that a person can only progress in life and perceive God by clearing his mind of confusion and haphazard thinking. Once a person has done this, they will be able to achieve a level of equanimity and clarity of mind that will allow them to plan a path through life that is independent of the fallacies that are the subconscious product of personal weakness and temptations. They will also be able to recognise the subtleties (subtleness) of God's manifestation in the world.

Ziv would study for twelve solid, successive hours each day no matter the time of year. He explained that only through clarity and clear mindedness can a person overcome their will to act impulsively and achieve focus.

Dov Katz described Ziv’s approach to learning as consisting of three guiding principles:

1. One should become emotionally involved in his studies, whether joyful or sad.
2. One should ask oneself after everything one learns, "What did I think before, and what do I know differently now?"
3. One's study should always delve beyond the external facets and arrive at the essence of the topic.

He encouraged practices that would encourage visualization and introspection.

== Students ==
His foremost student was Yeruchom Levovitz the Mashgiach of Mir, who wrote all of his texts into Chochmah Umussar, due to the fact that no one else was able to put it out. His other students included many of the musar greats of the next generation: Nosson Tzvi Finkel of Slabodka, Aharon Bakst, Reuven Dov Dessler (whose son Eliyahu Eliezer Dessler authored the classic Michtav M'Eliyahu), Nachum Ze'ev Ziv, and Zvi Hirsch Braude.

There were many other great Rabbis who only spent a short period in Kelmė, yet were greatly influenced by Ziv. Among these are Yosef Leib Bloch, the rabbi and Rosh Yeshiva of Telšiai, Yosef Yoizel Horowitz of Novhardok, Elya Lopian of the Knesses Chizkiyahu Yeshiva in Israel, and Chaim Yitzchak Bloch Hacohen, the chief rabbi of Bausk and Plungė.

Other students of Ziv entered professions including medicine, law, and engineering. One of his students, Israel Isidor Elyashev, became a well-known literary critic.

== Published works ==
Many of Ziv's discourses and letters to his students were published in a two-volume work, Hokhmah U-Musar, edited by Yeruchom Levovitz and Simcha Zissel Halevi Levovitz. Additional letters, as well as transcriptions of his words by his disciples, appear in a series of volumes under the title Kitvei Ha-Sabba Mi-Kelm.

An English translation of the opening letters of Hokhmah U-Musar by Ira Stone appears in Stone's A Responsible Life: The Spiritual Path of Musar.
