= Yosef Yozel Horwitz =

Belarusian rabbi

Yosef Yozel Horowitz (Hebrew: יוסף יוזל הורוביץ), also Yosef Yoizel Hurwitz, known as the Alter of Novardok (1847–December 9, 1919), was a student of Rabbi Yisroel Salanter, the founder of the Musar movement. The Alter was also a student of Rabbis Yitzchak Blazer and Simcha Zissel Ziv and spent some time in Brest, learning from Rabbi Chaim Soloveichik. He established the Novardok yeshiva in the city of Navahrudak. Additionally, he established a network of yeshivas in Dvinsk, Minsk, Warsaw, Berdichev, Lida and Zetl. Some of his discourses were recorded in the book Madregas Ha-Adam (Hebrew: מדרגת האדם, Stature of Man). The most basic and important theme in his book is Bitachon (trust in God). (The Alter would sign his name: "B. B.," for Ba'al Bitachon, "Master of Trust [in God]".)

== Biography ==
=== Family ===
The Alter was born in 1847, in Plongian, Lithuania. His father was Rabbi Shlomo Zalman Ziv (later Horowitz), a dayan and rabbi in Plongian and later the rabbi of Kurtuvian. Yosef Yozel had three brothers and four sisters. The Alter acquired his basic education under the supervision of his father. He joined the Kelm yeshiva when he was still very young. At the age of sixteen, he was already delivering the shiur (lesson) in the synagogue of Kurtuvian.

At eighteen, The Alter married the eldest daughter of Rabbi Yaakov Stein, a textile store owner from Shvekesna. As Stein died shortly before the wedding, after the wedding, The Alter assumed the management of his father-in-law's business, as well as the support of Stein's widow and eight children.

=== Meeting Rabbi Yisrael Salanter ===
Because of his business commitments, he was a frequent visitor to Memel, where at the age of 27, he met Rabbi Yisrael Salanter, who was the rabbi of Memel at that time. After attending a number of Salanter's classes and meeting with him, The Alter decided to close his business, leave Shvekesna, and to study Torah full-time in Kovno. This was met with some opposition from his father, Rabbi Shlomo Zalman Horowitz, and from Rabbi Yisroel Salanter, both of whom were concerned about the reaction of his wife to the decision. He assured them, however, that “she has always understood me, and she will understand me this time, too.”

=== Seclusion in Kovno ===
On the advice of Rabbi Yisroel Salanter, The Alter joined Kovno's Kollel Perushim where he studied under Rabbis Yitzchak Blazer, Naftali Amsterdam and Avraham Shenker, musar students of Rabbi Yisroel Salanter.

The Alter eventually brought his wife and children to Kovno, where his wife gave birth to two more children and died in childbirth. After his wife's death, The Alter divided his children among relatives and secluded himself in the home of a Kovno tinsmith by the name of Rabbi Shlomo. He remained in that room for a year and a half without emerging. To guarantee his solitude, he blocked the entrance to his quarters with a brick wall, which contained two small windows through which he maintained contact with his landlord when necessary. He was served dairy meals through one window and meat through the other window.

=== Forced to leave ===
In 1881/1882, the maskilim published a series of articles in which they ridiculed The Alter's seclusion. Later, they threw a bundle of forged banknotes into his yard and then informed the police that his hideout was a base for the manufacture of counterfeit money. That day, The Alter's mother came to visit him and she burned the bundle. Soon afterward, the police stormed The Alter's room and broke down the wall. Although they found nothing suspicious, they forbade him to live in seclusion.

Shortly after he emerged from seclusion, his mentors urged him to remarry. One evening, The Alter passed Rabbi Shlomo's house and heard someone crying. The following day, he asked Rabbi Shlomo what had happened. Rabbi Shlomo told him that the man whom his daughter, Chaya Rivka, was supposed to marry, had broken the engagement. The Alter told Rabbi Shlomo he would marry Chaya Rivka, but only on the condition that he be allowed to isolate himself all week, returning to his family only for Shabbat and Yom Tov. They agreed to this condition, and the match was finalized. Rabbi Gershon Chirinsky, a lumber merchant who owned estates around Zetl, (with the assistance of Rabbi E. Lachman from Berlin), built a forest retreat, where The Alter secluded himself for 12 years, visiting his family only on Shabbat.

When his father died in 1890, and Kurtuvian offered him the position that he would have inherited from his father as head of the community, he did not accept it because he had a sister who was left an orphan and he rejected the rabbinical seat in favour of his future brother-in-law.

=== Establishing Yeshivas ===
In 1893/1894, The Alter began to visit Rabbi Simcha Zissel Ziv in Kelm. Rabbi Simcha Zissel persuaded The Alter to make an effort to counteract the influences of the Haskala Movement.

Once more, The Alter left his seclusion and founded a network of kollels in 20 Polish and Russian towns, among them Shavli, Dvinsk, Minsk, Warsaw, Berditchev, Novardok, Odessa, Lida and Zetl. Once a kollel was established, he would urge his students to establish adjoining yeshivas. The institutions were financed by Rabbi Lachman and headed by Rabbi Yitzchak Blazer. The Yeshiva in Berdichev had two hundred students. When The Alter heard the pupils arguing at a difficult study or discussion, he did not leave until the matter was settled (Rabbi Dov Katz wrote about this subject in his book “Tnuat Musar” (“The Musar Movement”) p. 199).

The Alter also founded a Yeshiva Gedolah in Novardok, where the alumni of the many yeshivas he had established came to study. More than 300 students were enrolled in this yeshiva.

When World War I broke out, The Alter decided to move the yeshiva from the border. He did not permit the yeshiva to remain in Novardok. In 1914/1915, The Alter set out for Ukraine in search of new quarters for the yeshiva. Before leaving, he told his students that if the Germans neared Novardok, they should flee in the direction of Ukraine. The Alter found quarters for the yeshiva in Homel. In the meantime, the Germans conquered the area near Novardok, and the yeshiva students fled to Homel. In Homel, they lived in the home of Rabbi Yaakov Katz. Soon, it became so crowded that they had to move to a nearby beis medrash, and then to various shuls in the city. By the end of the summer of 1915, 80 students had reached Homel, and the yeshiva was reestablished.

=== In Kiev ===
In 1917/1918, wartime circumstances forced The Alter to transfer the yeshiva from Homel to Kiev, where he founded four more yeshiva gedolahs.

During Succos 1919, the Russians made pogroms in Kiev, killing hundreds of Jews. Many Jews in the area sought shelter in Horwitz's home, believing that they would be spared in his merit. On Simchas Torah, the situation worsened, but The Alter instructed his students to conduct hakafos as usual. The rioters fired at the windows of his house. Everyone dropped to the floor – except The Alter, who remained standing at the head of the table, kiddush-cup in hand.

=== Death and burial ===
After Succos, a typhoid epidemic broke out in Kiev, taking the lives of thousands of its residents. The Alter's home soon filled with invalids to whom he personally attended. In Kislev, he contracted the disease, and never recovered from it. Still, he continued to attend to the needs of the invalids. He died on December 9, 1919.

Jews of Kiev and its suburbs streamed to his funeral. The last to eulogize him was his student, Rabbi Dovid Budnik. Forty-three years later, his students transferred his coffin to Israel, and in the summer of 1963 he was reinterred in the Har HaMenuchot cemetery in Jerusalem.

The anniversary of his passing - the 17th of Kislev - remains an important commemoratory date among Novardokers, who would gather together that day to strengthen each other.

== Opposition ==
The Alter was exposed to criticism from Rabbi Yitzchak Elchanan Spektor. Rabbi Burshtain from Tavrik, Lithuania and Rabbi Itzchok Jankef Reines from Lida also opposed The Alter's way of mussar. The Rabbi of Novardok, Rabbi Yechiel Michel Epstein, although not a follower the mussar movement, was a staunch supporter of The Alter and the Novardok yeshiva.

Rabbi Avrohom Yeshaya Karelitz, known as The Chazon Ish, argued with certain elements of the Novardok philosophy, particularly The Alter's approach to the subject of Bitachon, faith and trust in G-d. While Novardok engaged in regular daily sessions of critical self analysis of one's personality and motivations as well as a de-emphasis of worldly physical pleasures and comforts, Hillel Goldberg notes that disciples of Novardok were among the happiest people in the yeshivah world. Furthermore, their ability to meet the challenges of their time with calm and consistent commitment to their values, was unmatched by their peers outside of the Novardok yeshiva network.

== Novardok yeshivas ==
In consonance with his emphasis on unwavering bitachon (trust in Divine providence), The Alter's followers would board trains in time of civil war with no fear, and establish dozens of yeshivas in Russia, all named Yeshivas Beis Yosef (followed by the name of the town which hosted that branch of the yeshiva), in honor of The Alter. After the rise of communism, and its accompanying campaign of terror against all organized religion and against the yeshivahs in particular, the Novardok students fled to cross the border to Poland, often risking their lives to help fellow students escape as well.

While The Alter was still alive, the directors of these yeshivas were in constant contact with The Alter, who guided and visited them, spending nearly every Shabbos in a different town, even when he was already quite elderly by that time. When his closest students tried to dissuade him from making such journeys, he would respond by citing the verse (Genesis 12:9), “And Avraham journeyed, continuously traveling,” on which Malbim comments, “He went to sanctify Hashem’s name.”

One year, The Alter spent Rosh Hashana in Homel, Shabbat Shuvah in Kiev and Yom Kippur in Kharkov, cities which are very distant from one another.

== Successors ==
The Alter had three sons-in-law: Rabbi Alter Shmeulevitz, Rabbi Isroel Yankef Lubchanski and Rabbi Avraham Yoffen. Rabbi Yoffen, the Alter's main successor, was the head of the Novardok Yeshiva in Białystok. He later started a Beis Yosef Yeshiva in New York, and later moved to Eretz Yisroel. Rabbi Shmuelevitz was a renowned scholar and was a follower of the derech hapilpul. He was not a follower of The Alter's way of musar. In the end, Rabbi Alter Shmeulevitz left Novardok and became the head of the yeshiva in Shchuchyn. Rabbi Lubchanski followed the direction of his father-in-law. He was the supervisor of the yeshiva in Baranovichi, "Ohel Torah", which followed the way of musar. In later years (from 1921), Rabbi Elchonon Wasserman was the head of the Yeshiva. Rabbi Zvi Hirsh Gutman was the principal till the last day of its existence. Rabbis Lubchanski and Gutman were killed by the Nazis together with the Jewish community of Baranovichi.

=== After the Holocaust ===
With the exception of Gateshead Talmudical College which is officially called "Yeshivas Beis Yosef" of Gateshead, all the Novardok yeshivas in Europe were wiped out during the Holocaust.

Rabbi Yoffen survived the Holocaust and came to the United States, where he established the Novardok Yeshiva. He also headed the Beit Yosif Yeshiva in Israel.

Two branches of Novardok were founded in Jerusalem; one under the leadership of Rabbi Ben Zion Bruk and the other under the direction of Rabbis Shmuel and Eitan Jofen. Additional branches were started in New York City by various of Rabbi Avrom Yoffen's children and grandchildren. For instance, Rabbi Yechiel Perr of Far Rockaway, New York started Yeshivas Derech Ayson, a.k.a. Yeshiva of Far Rockaway, Rabbi Moshe Faskowitz of Queens, New York started Yeshiva Madregas Ha'Adam, and Rabbis Mordechai Yoffen and Yisroel Zvi (Heshy) Nekritz started Yeshivas Beis Yosef of Brooklyn along with Rabbi Yaakov Drilman, a lifelong friend, and a talmid of Rav Yitzchak Hutner.

An additional network of Novardok Yeshivas was founded after the Holocaust in France by Rabbi Gershon Liebman (1905–1997).

== Teachings ==
"A person should give up his whole future for today, so that he will not waste all his todays for one tomorrow."

When a typhus epidemic in Kiev severely affected his yeshiva's students as well, "Rabbi Joseph Jozel was found cleaning the yeshiva toilets."

"When it is necessary to send a letter, I send a telegram. When it is necessary to send a telegram, I send an emissary. When it is necessary to send an emissary, I go myself."

== External links & Reading ==
- BitachonBoost.com for an elucidation of part of Rabbi Horowitz's work.
- Madreigas Haadam - Darchei HaBitachon, Artscroll Publications
- The Alter of Novardok, Artscroll Publications
- To Turn the Many to Righteousness: Mezake Harabim, Feldheim Publications
- The World of Novardok, The Jewish Observer https://agudah.org/wp-content/uploads/2016/10/JO1977-V12-N03-04.pdf
- Why Are You Running, Mishpacha Magazine, https://agudah.org/wp-content/uploads/2016/10/JO1977-V12-N03-04.pdf
