= Mesillat Yesharim =

1738 text by Moshe Chaim Luzzatto

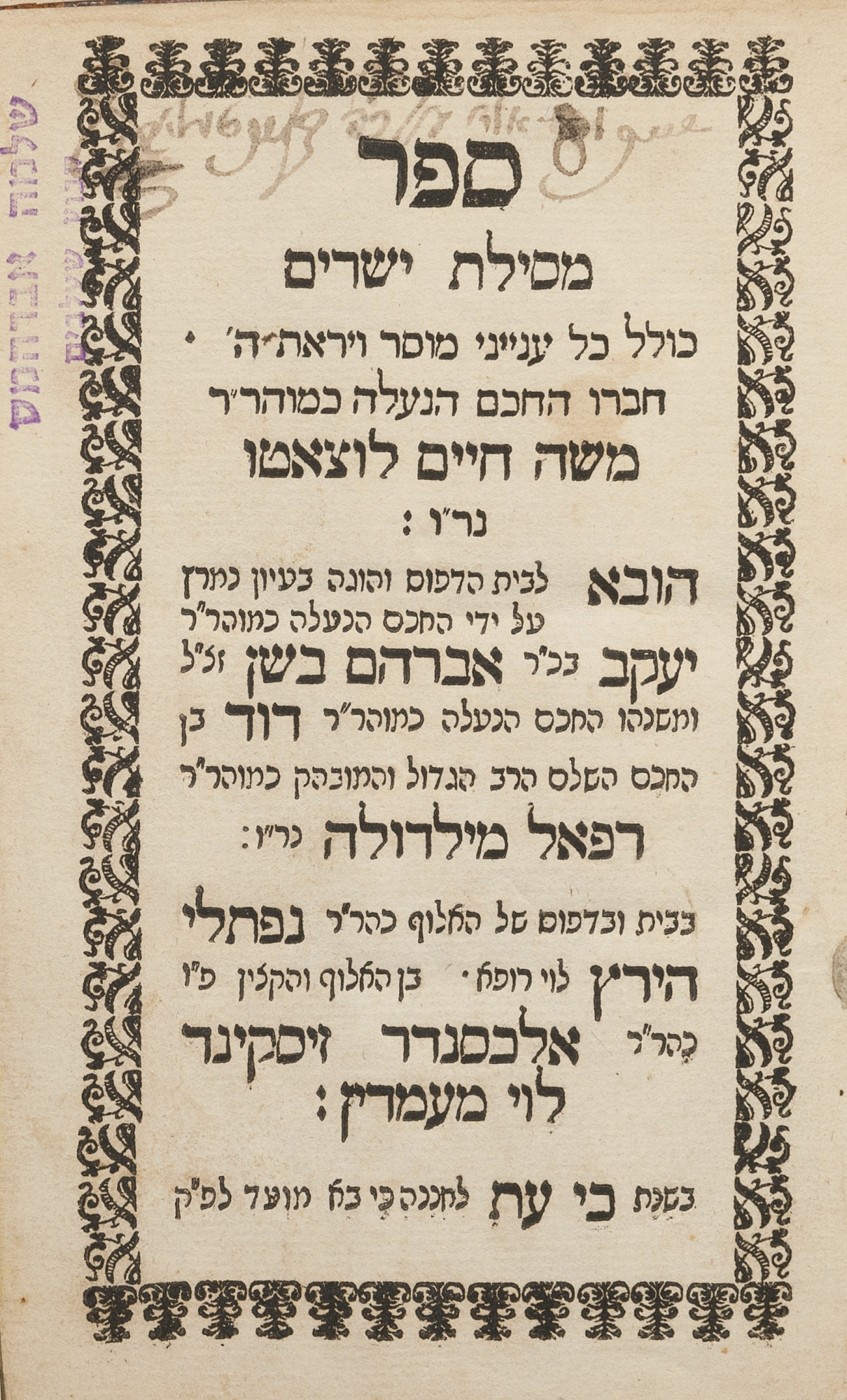
Cover of the first edition of Mesillat Yesharim.

Mesillat Yesharim or Mesillas Yeshorim (Hebrew: מסילת ישרים, lit. 'Path [of the] Upright') is an ethical (musar) text composed by the influential Rabbi Moshe Chaim Luzzatto (1707–1746). It is different from Luzzato's other writings, which are more philosophical.

Mesillat Yesharim was written and published in Amsterdam. The earliest known manuscript version, written in 1738, was arranged as a dialogue between a hakham (wise man) and a hasid (pious person). Before publication, it was rearranged to have only one speaker. The dialogue version often sheds light on the more well-known version.

Mesillat Yesharim is probably Luzzato's most influential work, widely learned in virtually every yeshiva since formal study of musar texts was introduced to the yeshiva curriculum by the Musar movement of Rabbi Yisroel Salanter.

== Aim of the work ==
The aim of this work extends beyond the achievement of the perfection of human character in the service of the divine. Its stated aim is to remind the reader of one's deepest obligations in this regard, as well as to encourage the centrality of the deep study of this subject matter in one's daily life. Unlike much of the Musar literature, which is ordered according to the authors' own lists of character traits, Luzzato builds his work on a baraita in the name of the sage Pinchas ben Yair, whose list goes in order of accomplishment:

Rabbi Pinchas ben Yair said: Torah leads to watchfulness; watchfulness leads to alacrity; alacrity leads to cleanliness; cleanliness leads to abstention; abstention leads to purity; purity leads to piety; piety leads to humility; humility leads to fear of sin; fear of sin leads to holiness; holiness leads to prophecy; prophecy leads to the resurrection of the dead.

Within each step, Luzzatto explains the step itself, its elements, how it can be acquired, and what might detract from its acquisition. For example, Watchfulness can be acquired by setting aside time for introspection, but it can be impaired by excessive mundane responsibilities, bad company, or a cynical stance in life. The same pattern is used for every trait mentioned.

Luzzatto's expressed goal is to condition the reader to accept a disciplined approach to "restrain animal instincts" and encourage "the divine spark in every human into a bright, warming flame", according to Trude Weiss-Rosmarin.

== Outline ==
Mesillat Yesharim is divided into 26 chapters, over which Luzzatto explains the ethical and religious duties commanded in the Torah and elaborated by the Sages.

Introduction
Man's General Duty in His World (Ch. 1)
Watchfulness (zehirut) (Ch. 2-5)
Alacrity (zerizut) (Ch. 6-9)
Cleanliness (of sin, nekiyut) (Ch. 10-12)
Abstention (of improper practices, perishut) (Ch. 13-15)
Purity (tahara) (Ch. 16-17)
Piety (chassidut) (Ch. 18-21)
Humility (anava) (Ch. 22-23)
Fear of sin (yirat chet) (Ch. 24-25)
Holiness (kedusha) (Ch. 26-27)
Epilogue

== Influence ==
Mesillat Yesharim is perhaps the most important Jewish ethical text of the early modern period. The Vilna Gaon is reported to have commented that he could not find a superfluous word in the first eleven chapters of the work, and stated that he would have traveled to meet the author and learn from his ways if he had still been alive. These and similar pronouncements largely cleared Luzzato from misgivings by others as to his suspected Sabbatean leanings.

Mesillat Yesharim became Luzzatto's most famous ethical tract and one of the most popular Jewish ethical treatises. It was published in ten different editions between 1740 and 1835. Along with Shirei Tiferet (Poems of Glory) by Naphtali Hirz Wessely, Mesillat Yesharim became part of the Musar canon over the course of the 1780s to the middle of the 19th century.

American rabbi Mordecai Kaplan published the first English translation of Mesillat Yesharim through the Jewish Publication Society of America in 1936.

== Text, translations, and commentaries ==
- Complete Messillat Yesharim online
  - Hebrew original
  - English translation
- Translations
  - Luzzatto, Moses Hayyim. Messillat Yesharim: The Path of the Upright; translated by Mordecai Kaplan from the critical edition. Philadelphia: Jewish Publication Society. ISBN 978-0-8276-0856-6.
  - Luzzato, Rabbi Moshe Chayim. Mesillas Yeshorim; translated by Rav. Yaakov Bar Yosef. Netzari Faith Publishers. ISBN 9781329314627.
  - Luzzato, Rabbi Moshe Chayim. Mesillas Yeshorim; translated by Yosef Leiber. New York: Feldheim Publishers. ISBN 1-58330-691-9.
  - Luzzato, Rabbi Moshe Chayim. The Path of the Just; translated by Yaakov Feldman. New York: Jason Aronson Publishers. ISBN 1-56821-596-7.
  - Luzzato, Rabbi Moshe Chayim. The Complete Mesillat Yesharim; translated by Avraham Shoshana and associates. Cleveland: Ofeq Institute. ISBN 1-881255-44-1.
- Commentaries on Messilllat Yesharim
  - Ira F. Stone's commentary, included in the new Jewish Publication Society edition of the book (ISBN 978-0-8276-0856-6).
  - Hillel, Yaakov Moshe. Ascending the Path: Insights Into Mesillat Yesharim. Jerusalem: Yeshivat Hevrat Ahavat Shalom. 7 vol
  - Ohr La'Yesharim on Mesilat Yesharim with a compendium of commentaries and explanations by great rabbis from the Musar Movement.
  - Mesilat Yesharim with commentary Sod L'Yesharim, a compendium of commentaries and explanations from other books by the Ramchal.
  - Mandelbaum, Alexander Aryeh. Bam'silah Naale.
  - Bilvavi Mishkan Evneh on Mesilias Yesharim
