= Menachem Mendel Lefin =

Ukraine-born Jewish maskil (1749–1826)

Menachem Mendel Lefin of Satanov (Hebrew: מנחם מנדל מסאטנוב; c. 1749–1826) was an Eastern European writer and a leader of the Haskalah movement.

== Biography ==
He was born in Sataniv, Podolia, where he had a traditional Jewish education supplemented by studies in science, mathematics, and medieval philosophy. In the early 1780s he lived in Berlin, where he met Moses Mendelssohn and other Haskalah leaders. He was later introduced to Prince Adam Kazimierz Czartoryski, and became a tutor to Czartoryski's children in Podolia. He spent most of his life living in Galicia, and had great influence on Nachman Krochmal and Joseph Perl. He is widely regarded as the "father of the Galician Haskalah."

He campaigned in favor of adding general education to the standard curriculum in Jewish schools, and he was a fierce opponent of Hasidic Judaism and Kabbalah, which he viewed as "nonsense." In 1791, he published a French-language pamphlet advocating for Jewish reform, criticizing the Hasidic movement for opposing integration. Among his influential works is a Musar text titled Heshbon Ha-Nefesh (Moral Accounting), which was published in 1808, based in part on the ethical program described in the autobiography of Benjamin Franklin. Levin died in Tarnopol in 1826.

Lefin spent the last part of his life in Brody and Tarnopol, which had become centers of the Haskalah. There he influenced Haskalah intellectuals such as Yosef Perl, Betsal’el Stern, and Yitsḥak Ber Levinzon.

== Heshbon Ha-Nefesh ==
Lefin’s best-known work is Heshbon Ha-Nefesh (“Accounting of the Soul”). The work presents:

- A structured program of ethical self-examination
- Focused attention on specific character traits over set periods
- Regular introspection and self-assessment
- Moral development framed explicitly as service of God

It was translated to English in 1995 by Feldheim Publishers.

== Other writings ==
- Sefer Makhkimat Peti ("Book of the Enlightening of the Foolish"), no longer extant
- Der Ershter Khosid ("The First Hasid"), no longer extant
- Moda la-Binah (Berlin, 1789), which encouraged East European Jews to study natural sciences and medicine
- a translation of Joachim Heinrich Campe's travel book: קמפה, יואכים הינריך; לפין, מנחם מנדל בן יהודה ליב (1859). מסעות הים: המה מעשי ה' ונפלאותיו אשר ראו יורדי ימים באניות האלאנדי ובריטאניא ... כולל שני מסעות: א. על ים הקרח הצפוני בשנת שנ"ו ב. על ים הדרומי בשנת תקמ"ו (in Hebrew). דוס D. H. SCHRNZEL S.
- A translation of Maimonides' The Guide for the Perplexed (Zolkiew, 1829), written in easy-to-read Mishnaic Hebrew
- Elon Moreh, an introduction to the Guide for the Perplexed (Odessa, 1867)
- Sefer Kohelet (Odessa, 1873; Vilna, 1930), a Yiddish translation of Ecclesiastes
- Essai d'un plan de réforme ayant pour objet d'eclairer la nation juive en Pologne et de redresser par là ses moeurs (1791–92).

== Influence of Benjamin Franklin ==
Scholars have noted a structural similarity between the ethical self-improvement program outlined in Lefin's Heshbon HaNefesh and the moral regimen described by Benjamin Franklin in his Autobiography. Franklin proposed a system of thirteen character traits, cultivated sequentially on a weekly cycle and tracked through written charts. Heshbon HaNefesh likewise presents a structured program of character refinement involving a defined set of traits, weekly focus, and systematic self-accounting.

Modern academic literature often describes this resemblance as evidence of direct influence. This view is supported by several nineteenth-century Jewish writers who explicitly stated that Lefin adapted Franklin’s method and reformulated it for a Jewish ethical framework. In addition, unpublished German-language manuscripts attributed to Lefin, identified in the early twentieth century, refer to Franklin’s method of moral improvement, suggesting that Lefin was familiar with Franklin’s writings and privately acknowledged this influence.

At the same time, Lefin did not cite Franklin by name in the Hebrew text of Heshbon HaNefesh. The work is presented entirely within a traditional Jewish framework, grounding character refinement in service of God, repentance, and moral accountability as understood in classical Jewish ethics. The traits themselves are treated flexibly, and the program is explicitly subordinated to religious aims rather than civic or philosophical virtue. As a result, many rabbinic authorities and later Musar figures understood the work as fully compatible with Orthodox Jewish values.

The book’s acceptance and endorsement within the Musar movement—most notably by Rabbi Yisrael Salanter and Rabbi Yitzchak Isaac Sher, who wrote a foreword to later editions—indicates that its method was viewed as a neutral or permissible tool rather than as an expression of Enlightenment ideology. In this reading, Lefin’s use of a systematic technique associated with Franklin reflects methodological borrowing rather than philosophical alignment. Consequently, while the relationship between Heshbon HaNefesh and Franklin’s ethical program is widely acknowledged at the level of structure and technique, its substance and purpose remain firmly rooted in traditional Jewish moral thought.

== Legacy ==
In addition to influencing the Haskalah movement, Lefin's work was also embraced by Musar movement leaders. Rabbi Yisrael Salanter, founder of the Musar movement, recommended Heshbon HaNefesh as a legitimate tool for ethical development. Rabbi Yitzchak Sher, rosh yeshiva of Slabodka Yeshiva (Lithuania), wrote a foreword to later editions of the work, situating it firmly within the Orthodox Musar tradition. Heshbon HaNefesh remains in print and continues to be studied, including within Musar-influenced Orthodox communities. His work is often cited as a bridge between classical Jewish ethics and later systematic approaches to character development.
