= Everett Gendler =

American rabbi (1928–2022)

Everett Gendler (August 8, 1928 – April 1, 2022) was an American rabbi, known for his leadership of and involvement in progressive causes, including the civil rights movement, Jewish nonviolence, and the egalitarian Jewish Havurah movement. From 1978 to 1995, he served as the first Jewish Chaplain at Phillips Academy, Andover. He has been described as the "father of Jewish environmentalism".

== Biography ==
Gendler was born in Chariton, Iowa, in 1928 to a religious Jewish family who moved to Des Moines in 1939. He graduated from Theodore Roosevelt High School and went on to earn a B.A. from the University of Chicago in 1948 during the height of Robert Hutchins's leadership. He remained at Chicago until 1951 studying with the philosopher Rudolf Carnap. In 1957, he was ordained as a Conservative rabbi by the Jewish Theological Seminary.

In the late 1950s and early 1960s, Gendler served as rabbi to a number of congregations throughout Latin America, including the Beth Israel Community Center in Mexico City, Mexico (1957–1959), the Associacao Religiosa Israelita in Rio de Janeiro, Brazil (1961), and the five congregations of Havana, Cuba (High Holidays and Passover, 1968–1969). From 1962 to 1968, Gendler served as rabbi at the Jewish Center of Princeton, New Jersey.

During the late 1960s and early 1970s, Gendler, along with his wife Mary Gendler (born 1940) was involved in several alternative residential communities, including Ivan Illich's Centro Intercultural de Documentación in Cuernavaca, Mexico (1968–1969) (alongside Harvey Cox) and the inter-racial inter-religious living center Packard Manse in Stoughton, Massachusetts (1969–1971).

In 1971, Gendler became rabbi at Temple Emanuel of the Merrimack Valley and in 1977, Gendler was appointed by Ted Sizer as the first Jewish chaplain at Phillips Academy, Andover as part of a Catholic–Protestant–Jewish "tri-ministry" Gendler remained in his position at Phillips Andover, alongside his position at Temple Emanuel of the Merrimack Valley, until his retirement, at the age of 67, in 1995.

From 1995 to 2022, Gendler, along with his wife Mary Gendler, was involved in community education work among the Tibetan exiles on Strategic Nonviolent Struggle. In 2007, they played a central role in the founding of the Active Nonviolence Education Center in Dharmasala, India.

He is the father of two daughters, Tamar Gendler, a professor of philosophy at Yale University, and Naomi Gendler Camper, who is Chief Policy Officer at the American Bankers Association.

Everett Gendler died of natural causes at Sarasota Memorial Hospital in 2022.

== Civil rights work ==
Gendler became involved in the civil rights movement in the mid-1950s, sparked by his involvement in the American Jewish Society for Service 1955 summer institute at the Highlander Folk School in Monteagle, Tennessee. During the 1960s, he played a pivotal role in involving American Jews in the movement, leading groups of American Rabbis to participate in prayer vigils and protests in Albany, Georgia (1962), Birmingham, Alabama (1963) and Selma, Alabama (1965), and persuading Abraham Joshua Heschel to participate in the famous march from Selma to Montgomery (1965). Gendler was instrumental in arranging Martin Luther King's important address to the national rabbinical convention on March 25, 1968, 10 days before King's death, conducting what was to be the final interview with MLK.

Gendler was also an early proponent in Judaism of equal rights for gays, women's ritual participation, and Palestinian rights.

== Jewish nonviolence ==
Gendler advocated the position that religious nonviolence is as much a part of Judaism as it is of other religions. His most widely distributed article on this topic is "Therefore Choose Life" anthologized in Roots of Jewish Nonviolence and The Challenge of Shalom. Gendler served on the board of the Jewish Peace Fellowship and on the board of the Shomer Shalom Institute for Jewish Nonviolence. In 2021, his translation of the works of Rabbi Aaron Samuel Tamares was published by Ben Yehuda Press, to critical acclaim. In 2013, he was honored with a Human Rights Hero Award by the T'ruah Foundation in recognition of a lifetime of work on behalf of nonviolence, human rights, the environment.

== Egalitarian Judaism ==
Gendler was an early member of Havurat Shalom, a founding member of the Alternative Religious Community in Marblehead, Massachusetts, and an important contributor to numerous progressive Jewish liturgical prayerbooks, journals and anthologies.

== Jewish environmentalism ==
During the 1960s and 1970s, inspired in part by the work and writings of his friends and mentors Helen and Scott Nearing, Gendler became involved in the conservation and environmental movements, and was an advocate and practitioner of organic farming and vegetarianism.

In 1978, he installed the world's first solar-powered eternal light on the roof of his Synagogue in Lowell Massachusetts. Over the next 30 years, he published dozens of articles on Jewish environmentalism and gave hundreds of lectures on the topic. In 2008, he received a Lifetime Achievement award for his contributions to Jewish environmentalism from the Isabella Freedman Jewish Retreat Center. In 2013, he was honored with the Presidents' Medallion from Hebrew Union College-Jewish Institute of Religion in recognition of "a life of passionate devotion to humankind" and a "lifetime of commitment to social justice and environmentalism." Also in 2013, his lifetime of work was recognized through the creation of the Gendler Grapevine Project, a six-year initiative designed to celebrate and perpetuate Gendler's life work, and serve as a permanent repository of his articles and teachings.

== See also ==
- Jewish vegetarianism
- List of peace activists
