= Salantai =

City in Klaipėda County, Lithuania

- City
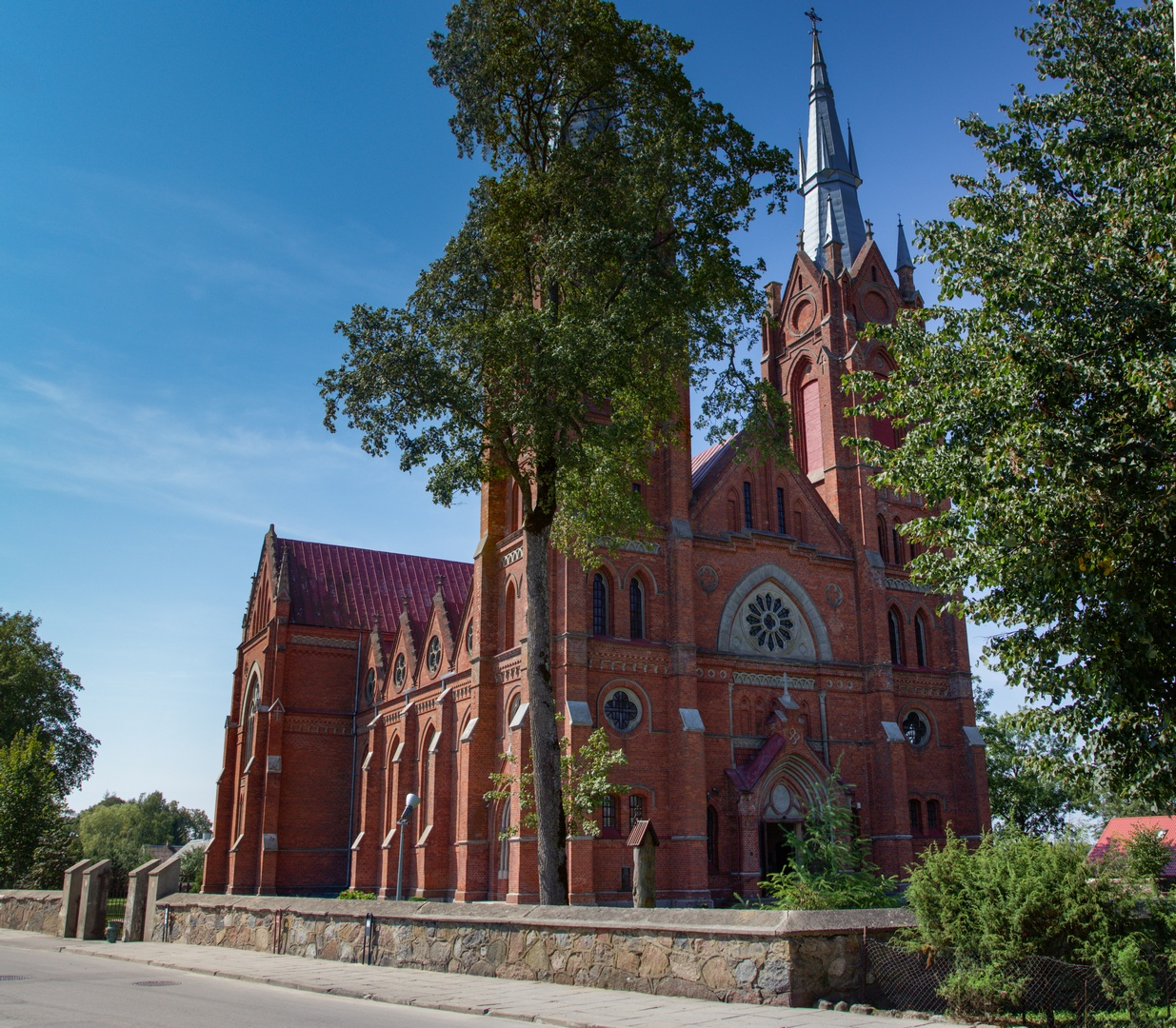
- Salantai Church of the Assumption of the Blessed Virgin Mary

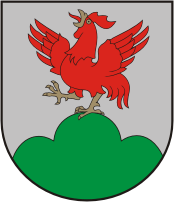
- Coat of arms

- Location of Salantai
- Coordinates: 56°4′0″N 21°34′0″E
- Country: Lithuania
- Ethnographic region: Samogitia
- County: Klaipėda County
- Municipality: Kretinga district municipality
- Eldership: Salantai eldership
- Capital of: Salantai eldership
- First mentioned: 1556
- Granted city rights: 1746

Population (2022)
  - Total: 1,259
- Time zone: UTC+2 (EET)
  - Summer (DST): UTC+3 (EEST)

Salantai is a city in Lithuania. It is located in the Klaipėda County, Kretinga district.

== Etymology ==
Salantai is named after the Salantas River, which runs through the city.

== History ==
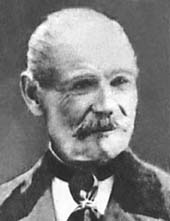
Aleksandras Bendikas, book carrier and publisher

The Salantai region is known to have been inhabited since the Bronze Age. The first mention of a settlement was in 1556; the Skilandžiai manor and town are mentioned. By 1567, the settlement had a marketplace, 4 streets, and 27 houses. In 1630, the first church was constructed. Starting from 1638, Skilandžiai was called Salantai. In 1667, a parish school was founded. In 1668, Salantai was named a town in which 66 families lived at the time. In 1750, forty Catholic homes or homesteads (kiemas) were counted. In 1765, the first enumeration of Jewish taxpayers found 279.

Aleksandras Bendikas, the Lithuanian book carrier and publisher settled in Salantai and since 1905 started to publish a calendar for the farmers Traveler, leaving to Samogitia and Lithuania (Keleivis, išeinąs į Žemaičius ir Lietuvą). A parson, canon Pranas Urbonavičius established a consumers' co-operative Kaukas in 1905, in 1906 opened a Lithuanian primary school for girls supported by the Saulė Society, and in 1906–1911 built church (archit. Karlas Eduardas Strandmanas).

This town is known for three famed rabbis: Rabbi Yisrael Lipkin Salanter, his teacher Rabbi Zundel Salant, and Rabbi Shmuel Salant, who spent most of his life in Salantai. Ashkenazi chief rabbi of Jerusalem between 1866 and 1910, also lived here before immigration. During the summer of 1941, 95 Jews of the city were massacred in a mass execution by Nazis and their local collaborators in the nearby forest.

In 2025, Lithuanian researchers found records in metrics of the Salantai Church of the Assumption where it is stated that Michał Kleofas Ogiński was born in the surroundings of Salantai and was baptized in the Salantai Church of the Assumption.

== Culture ==
The Orvydas Farmstead located on the outskirts of Salantai is a sculpture park created by the Lithuanian artist Vilius Orvydas.
