= Ira F. Stone =

American rabbi and theologian (born 1949)

- Born: 1949 (age 76–77)
- Occupations: congregational rabbi professor
- Notable work: A Responsible Life
- Spouse: Annie Stone
- Theological work
- Language: English
- Tradition or movement: Conservative Judaism
- Main interests: Musar Movement; Emmanuel Levinas; Jewish philosophy

Rabbi Ira F. Stone (born 1949) is a leading figure in the contemporary renewal of the Musar movement, a Jewish ethical movement.

== Career ==
Stone was ordained as a rabbi at the Jewish Theological Seminary of America in 1979, and proceeded to serve congregations in Seattle and Philadelphia while also teaching at the Jewish Theological Seminary of America and the Reconstructionist Rabbinical College. He served as rabbi of Temple Beth Zion-Beth Israel in Philadelphia from 1988 until his retirement in 2015. Stone became the founding director of the Center for Contemporary Mussar in 2017.

== Musar Movement ==
Stone is a scholar of Emmanuel Levinas and of the Musar movement. His book A Responsible Life: The Spiritual Path of Mussar draws on the thinking of Emmanuel Levinas in developing a contemporary vision of Musar. Unlike many other non-Orthodox Musar teachers, he believes that Musar practice must involve a commitment to the observance of Jewish law. Stone has also proposed that a dedication to Musar should be central to the approach of Conservative Judaism. Rabbi Ira Stone serves as the Rosh Yeshiva of the Center for Contemporary Mussar.

== Bibliography ==
Stone's books include:

- Reading Levinas/Reading Talmud (JPS, 1998)
- Seeking the Path of Life: Theological Meditations on the Nature of God, Life, Love and Death (Jewish Lights, 1993)
- Sketches for a Book of Psalms (Xlibris, 2000)
- A Responsible Life: The Spiritual Path of Mussar (Aviv Press, 2006)
- A commentary on Rabbi Moshe Hayyim Luzzatto's Mesillat Yesharim (Jewish Publication Society, 2010).
- In Search of the Holy Life: Rediscovering the Kabbalistic Roots of Mussar (iUniverse, 2019)
