= Moshe Shatzkes =

Lithuanian-Belarusian Orthodox rabbi, Talmudic scholar, and rosh yeshiva

Moshe Shatzkes (Hebrew: משה שאצקס; 1881 – December 29, 1958) was a rabbi and renowned Talmudic scholar, commonly known as the Łomża Rov".

== Early years ==
Shatzkes was born in Vilnius, Lithuania in 1881. His father, Rabbi Avraham Aharon Shatzkes, was the spiritual leader of Vilnius who was known as the "Illui mi Zhetel" (the Genius from Dzyatlava).

When Shatzkes was three years old his father died and soon after his mother married Yitzchak Blazer. Shatzkes studied at the Slabodka and Telz yeshivas. In 1904, he received semicha (rabbinical ordination) from Refael Shapiro, Eliezer Gordon, and Eliezer Rabinowitz. His son in law was the great talmid of Yeshivas Chaim Berlin, R Tzvi Hersh Levenberg.

== The Rabbinate ==
His first rabbinical position was in Lipnishuk, near Vilnius, in 1909. In 1914, he was appointed rabbi of the nearby larger town of Iwye.

He was regularly invited by the Chafetz Chaim to important rabbinic gatherings. He was vice-president of the Agudath HaRabbanim in Poland.

In 1931 he became rabbi and Av Beth Din of Łomża. His time in Łomża was marked by anti-Jewish demonstrations, the outlawing of kosher slaughtering and a boycott of Jewish shops. Many Łomża Jews fled and the community gradually declined. With the Hitler-Stalin pact in August 1939 on the division of Poland, Łomża was transferred to the Soviet Union.

Shatzkes escaped the city by night to Vilnius, which was later handed over by the Soviets to Lithuania. Along with many others, Shimon Shkop's yeshiva, Sha'ar HaTorah of Grodno, had fled to Vilnius. After Shkop's death Shatzkes was appointed by Rabbi Chaim Ozer Grodzinski to succeed him as rosh yeshiva.

Shatzkes was active in refugee and yeshiva affairs while in Vilnius. After the city was re-captured by the Russians, he travelled via Russia to Japan, having received a Japanese permit from Chiune Sugihara, the Japanese temporary consul in Kovno. Arriving in Kobe by boat in May 1941, Shatzkes immediately renewed his relief efforts for the almost five thousand Jewish refugees there. They included many yeshiva heads and almost the entire Mir Yeshiva, who had fled Poland and Lithuania.

He befriended the Japanese scholar Setzuso Kotsuji, a friend of Japan's Foreign Affairs minister, and with his help he aided the fleeing of thousands of refugees.

Shatzkes was selected by the refugee community as one of their two representatives (the other being the rebbe of Amshinov, Shimon Sholom Kalish) to the Japanese government.

Shatzkes reached America in 1941. He was immediately appointed a senior Rosh Yeshiva at Rabbi Isaac Elchanan Theological Seminary, remaining in this role for the rest of his life. He also served as a council member of the Agudath HaRabbanim of the United States and Canada.

Along with Joseph B. Soloveitchik and Samuel Belkin, Shatzkes was a member of the Rabbinical Ordination Board at the seminary, granting semicha to 425 of its graduates.

Shatzkes was a friend of Yitzchak Halevi Herzog, chief rabbi of Israel, and had been a friend of both the Chofetz Chaim and Chaim Ozer Grodzinski before the Second World War. He delivered eulogies at both their funerals.

== Death ==
He died on December 29, 1958, in Brooklyn, New York, at the age of 77.
