= Wissotzky Tea =

Tea company

- Native name: תה ויסוצקי
- Type: Tea Company
- Industry: Food and beverages
- Founded: Moscow, Russia 1849
- Founder: Kalman Zev (Kalonimus Wolf) Wissotzky
- Headquarters: Tel Aviv, Israel
- Area served: Worldwide
- Brands: The Signature Collection
- Owner: Wissotzky Family
- Number of employees: 400
- Parent: Wissotzky Group
- Divisions: Wissotzky Group
- Subsidiaries: Zeta Olive Oil in Galilee
- Website: https://www.wtea.com/
- Footnotes; 76% market share in Israel, largest Tea company worldwide

Wissotzky Tea (Hebrew: תה ויסוצקי) is an international, family-owned tea company based in Israel with offices in London and the United States. It is the leading tea distributor in Israel. Founded in 1849 in Moscow, Russia, it became the largest tea firm in the Russian Empire. By the early 20th century, it was the largest tea manufacturer in the world. It is one of the oldest tea companies in the world.

The Wissotzky Tea Company is headed by Shalom Seidler, a descendant of Shimon Zeidler; the latter, related to Wissotzky by marriage, opened the Middle East branch of the company in 1936. The company's headquarters are located in Tel Aviv while production takes place at a factory located in the Galilee; the company employs about 400 workers.

The company enjoys a 76% hold in the local market and exports its products worldwide. Wissotzky Tea is distributed in Canada, UK, Australia, Japan and South Korea, Europe, Hungary, Russia, Ukraine and the US kosher market, entering the United States mass market with its launch of The Signature Collection; a collection of "silky pyramid sachets" containing whole loose leaf tea, fruits and herbs.

== Kalman Ze'ev Wissotzky ==
Kalman Ze'ev Wissotzky (July 8, 1824 – May 24, 1904) was born in Starye Zagare in the Kovno Governorate in the Russian Empire, now Žagarė in northern Lithuania, to an Orthodox Jewish family. Following "a traditional Jewish education," Wissotsky, whose personal name later became known by various Anglicizations, married Keyla Zivya Abramson at age 18. With support from his in-laws, he studied the Talmud for three years, including six months at the renown Volozhin Yeshiva. He also was a student of Israel Salanter, who was also born in Žagarė. As a young man, he joined the Lovers of Zion and remained an observant Jew his entire life. Wissotzky, along with his in-laws and 18 other Jewish families, set up an agricultural cooperative about 32 kilometres (20 mi) from Dvinsk, now Daugavpils in Latvia. After, he was somehow allowed to move to Moscow, where he worked for Pyotr Kononovich Botkin (1781–1852), an innovative Russian tea trader. Wissotzky could eventually work himself up to a tea trader by selling tea door to door. While living in Moscow he gave himself a more acceptable Russian name: Wulf or Wolf Yankelevich, and his customers and partners knew him as Vasily Yakovlevich. After Botkin died Wissotzky started his own tea business in Moscow around 1858.

After moving to Moscow for economic reasons and "trading in tea," Wissotzky founded his signature tea company. Using his wealth, he funded a Jewish school in Jaffa, was a major supporter of the Jewish National Fund, helped found the Hebrew-language journal Hashiloah (edited by Ahad Ha'am, who also managed Wissotzky offices), and in 1908, his estate gave 200,000 rubles to the construction of what is today the Technion-Israel Institute of Technology

In 1885, as a representative of Lovers of Zion, Wissotzky spent three months touring the Land of Israel. Wissotzky and his wife Keyla had four children, three daughters, and their youngest son, David, born in 1861.

== History ==
=== 19th century ===
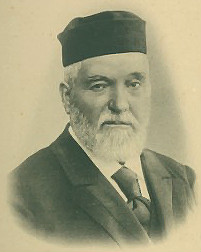
Kalonimus Wolf Wissotzky

In 1885, Kalonymus Zev Wissotzky visited the Holy Land, about which he later wrote a book. In that year, Wissotzky, who founded the tea company carrying his name in 1849, was already a wealthy and influential man, and was called "the Russian king of tea".

He had become a prominent figure in the proto-Zionist Hovevei Zion movement and was part of the leadership of the Bilu movement, founded in 1882. In 1885 the movement sent him to what is now Israel following an argument with the heads of the Jewish Yishuv, regarding the use of funds sent to the Holy Land from the Jewish diaspora. Hovevei Zion thought the money should be spent on founding new Jewish colonies, while the heads of the Yishuv disagreed. Wissotzky was given the role of touring the land in order to find a way of solving the debate, while keeping everyone happy.

Wissotzky Tea soon gained devoted customers all over the Russian Empire.

=== 20th century ===
==== 1900–1919 ====
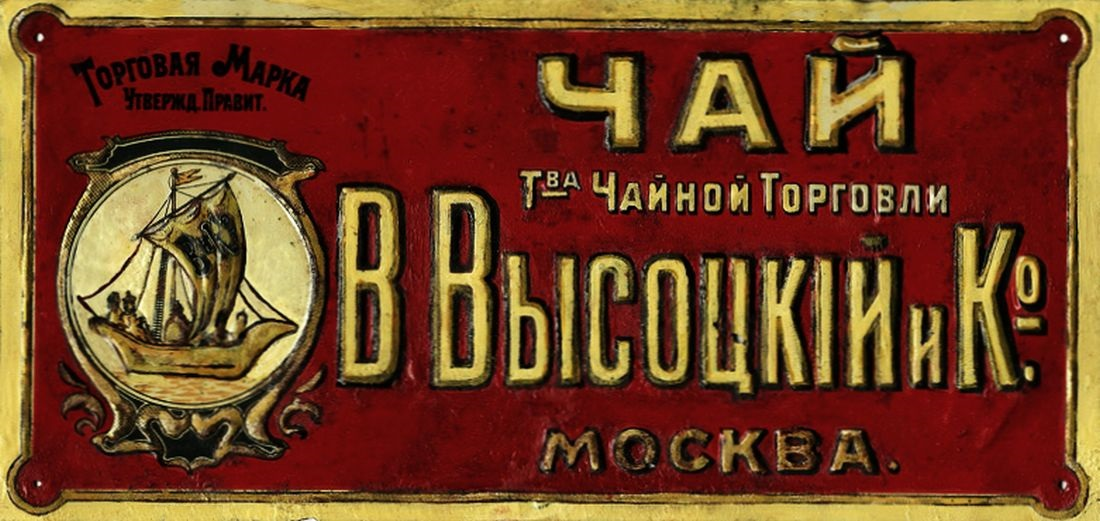
Wissotzky Tea logo, Russian Empire

By 1904 the company extended its activities to Germany, France, New York and Canada. In 1907, Wissotzky established the Anglo-Asiatic company with its head offices in London, which were managed by Ahad Ha'am, a renowned Jewish writer and philosopher. He had joined the company in 1903 on his resignation as editor of Ha-Shiloach, a Zionist journal. The company acquired plantations in both India and Ceylon (now Sri Lanka).

From the early 1900s through 1917, Wissotzky Tea Company was the largest tea company in the world. Following the October Revolution of 1917, all private businesses of the former Russian Empire were immediately nationalized by the government. It took two years to complete the takeover of Wissotzky Tea due to the social benefits provided by the company to its many employees.

In 1917, the company gradually ceased operations in Russia, and the Wissotzky family emigrated to the United States and Western Europe, opening branches in places such as Italy and Gdańsk, Poland.

During the Russian Revolution, an antisemitic trope in the form of a ditty mentioning Wissotzky Tea made the rounds of Russian society, spreading the idea that Russia was the victim of Jewish domination: "Tea of Wissotzky, Sugar of Brodsky, and Russia of Trotsky."

==== 1920–1939 ====
In the years following the Russian Revolution, Wissotzky Tea Company activities centered in London as its headquarters where it was managed by Boris Lourie and Gdańsk. Alexander Chmerling and Solomon Seidler, a tea specialist and scion of the Wissotzky family ran the operation in Gdańsk. Due to the vast emigration from Russia, the Polish facility catered to the demand for the tea they were accustomed to back home.

In 1936, Simon Seidler, the son of Solomon Seidler, sensed the impending danger of the war and left Poland for Palestine. In the following years, many of the family were murdered in the Holocaust and the company lost its holdings in Europe.

In 1936, Simon Seidler established a Wissotzky hub in the Middle East. Seidler began selling tea to British soldiers stationed in Mandatory Palestine, thereby promoting the brand name. Simon built a packing facility and gradually expanded the company's range of products. In 1957, Simon Seidler died, and his wife Ida Seidler took over the family's tea business. Ida introduced a modern approach to the manufacturing and marketing of the brand.

==== 1940–1999 ====
In 1945, Boris Lourie married Anna Wissotzky, and they had two sons, Serge Lourie (born 1946) and Michael Lourie (born 1948). The family holding company, Anglo-Asiatic Ltd, ceased to exist after the death of Boris Lourie, in a car crash, in 1950.

=== 21st century ===
Wissotzky Tea Company acquired Zeta Olive Oil, a leading olive oil company in the Galilee and Lahmi, a leading home baked goods company in Israel with an international brand named Elsastory.

In December 2012 the three companies formed the Wissotzky Group, a gourmet and delicacies conglomerate.

== Cultural references ==
"Visotskis Tey" is the title of a klezmer song by Josh Waletzky, based on a Sholem Aleichem story about a mother who peddles Wissotzky's tea to earn money to buy the freedom of her son who had been drafted into the czar's army.

== See also ==
- Economy of Israel
- Israeli cuisine
- Russian tea culture
