= David Jaffe (rabbi) =

American rabbi

Rabbi David Jaffe is a leading figure in the contemporary renewal of the Musar movement, a Jewish ethical movement. He is the author of Changing the World from the Inside Out: A Jewish Approach to Personal and Social Change, for which he was awarded the Jewish Book Council’s Myra H. Kraft Memorial Award in Contemporary Jewish Life and Practice in 2016. Jaffe is also a political activist who has been noted for his work in encouraging better funding for public schools in Massachusetts.
