= Yitzchak Elchanan Spektor =

Russian rabbi and Talmudist (1817–1896)

Rabbi Yitzchak Elchanan Spektor
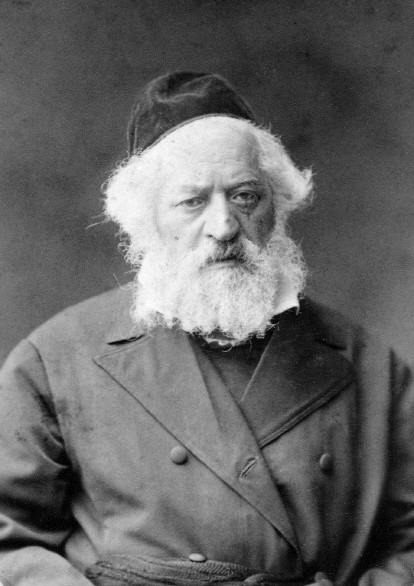

Personal life
- Born: 1817 Ros', Grodno Governorate, Russian Empire
- Died: March 6, 1896 (aged 78–79) Kaunas, Kaunas Governorate, Russian Empire
- Children: Chayyim; Benjamin Rabinovich; Hirsch Rabinovich; Rachel

Religious life
- Religion: Judaism
- Denomination: Orthodox

Yitzchak Elchanan Spektor or Isaac Elhanan Spector (Hebrew: יצחק אלחנן ספקטור; 1817 – March 6, 1896) was a Russian rabbi, posek and Talmudist of the 19th century.

== Early life ==
Spektor was born in Ros', Belarus (Yiddish: Rosh), then part of the Grodno Governorate of the Russian Empire. His father, Israel Issar, rabbi of Resh and Yitzchak Elchanan's first teacher, leaned toward Hasidism. Yitzchak Elchanan studied Talmud and at the age of thirteen he married, and settled with his wife's parents in Vilkovisk, where he remained for six years. He was for a short time the pupil of Elijah Schick, and later he studied under Benjamin Diskin, rabbi of Vilkovisk and was the fellow student of Diskin's son Joshua Leib Diskin, afterward rabbi of Brisk.

Spektor received his semikhah (rabbinic ordination) from Benjamin Diskin and from R. Isaac Ḥaber of Tiktin (later of Suwałki). His wife's 300 rubles dowry was lost in the bankruptcy of his debtor. In 1837 Spector became rabbi of the small adjacent town of Sabelin, with a weekly salary of five zlotys. He remained there for about two years, when he went to Karlin and introduced himself to R. Jacob of that town (author of "Mishkenot Ya'aḳob"), who recommended him to the community of Baresa (Biaroza), where Spektor became the town's rabbi in 1839 with a salary of one ruble a week.

== Rabbinical positions ==
In 1846, Spektor was chosen as rabbi of Nishvez, Minsk Governorate, but the community of Baresa was unwilling to let him go, and he left the town at night. He was paid four rubles a week, and when he accepted the rabbinate of Novohrodok (Kovno Governorate) in 1851 he secretly fled Nishvez at night, as he had left Baresa. He stayed in Novohrodok until 1864, when he was appointed chief rabbi of Kovno, a post he held until his death.

In 1857 he was the youngest member of a committee of rabbis chosen to regulate the management of the Volozhin yeshiva. In 1868, he headed a committee to help the poor during a drought which almost produced a famine, and he allowed the temporary use of peas and beans that year during the Passover, when they are normally forbidden by Ashkenazic rabbis. In 1875, he decided against the use of the Corfu Citron as Etrog, because of the high price at the time. In 1879 he arranged, through Prof. A. Harkavy, his former pupil, that three rabbis, Reuben of Dünaburg, Lipa Boslansky of Mir, and Elijah Eliezer Grodzenski of Vilna, should be added to the official rabbinical commission, which had hitherto consisted entirely of men of affairs and secular scholars.

== Relations with the Russian government ==
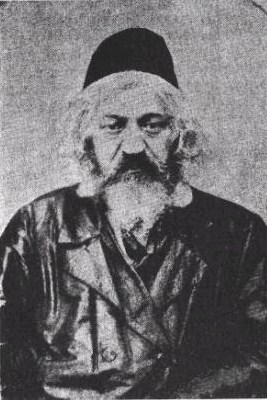
Yitzchak Elchanan Spektor

Together with Yisrael Salanter, he was active in opposing the antisemitic decrees of the Russian government. Spektor visited St. Petersburg twice to take part in conferences held there on the situation of the Jews after the riots of 1881. He successfully opposed the proposed establishment of a new rabbinical school like those in Vilna and Zhitomir, but failed to induce the government to recognize the synagogue rabbis instead of the government rabbis as the heads of Jewish communities.

In 1889, Spektor was elected an honorary member of the Society for the Promotion of Culture Among the Jews of Russia, whose philosophy he said was compatible with traditional Judaism. He identified with the traditional rabbinate but refrained from any confrontation with the young Haskala movement.

In 1889, Spektor opposed the proposed celebration of his rabbinical jubilee. He failed to save the Volozhin yeshiva from being closed by the government, but sponsored the "Kovnoer Perushim" as a substitute. He participated in the Kovno kollel and while sympathetic to the Hovevei Zion movement, he was opposed to political Zionism as a secular, nationalistic ideal. He was the anonymous friend who influenced Samson Raphael Hirsch in 1884 to write Ueber die Beziehung des Talmuds zum Judenthum, a defense of Talmudic literature against antisemitic slanders in Russia.

Spektor died at Kovno on 6 March 1896. Institutions named after him include Rabbi Isaac Elchanan Theological Seminary (RIETS, part of Yeshiva University) and the Knesses Beis Yitzchok Kaminetz of Baruch Ber Leibowitz. He had a daughter and three sons including Hirsch Rabinovich, who was maggid (preacher) of Vilna and later succeeded his father as rabbi of Kovno.

== Works ==
- Be'er Yitzchak, (Königsberg, 1858), responsa
- Ein Yitzchak, (part i., Wilna, 1889; part ii., ib. 1895), responsa
- Nachal Yitzchak, (part i., Wilna, 1872; part ii., ib. 1884), on parts of the Shulchan 'Aruk, Choshen Mishpat

== Sources ==
- Rabbi Ephraim Shimoff: Rabbi Isaac Elchanan Spektor - Life and letters.
- Jacob ha-Levi Lipschitz (Spektor's secretary for twenty-six years), Toledot Yiẓḥaḳ, Warsaw, 1897 (in Yiddish, Gaon Yiẓḥaḳ, Wilna, 1899);
- Der Israelit, Mayence, 1897, No. 15;
- Eisenstadt, Dor Rabbanaw we-Soferaw, iii. 31-33, Wilna, 1901;
- Eliezer Hillel Aronson, Erez ba-Lebanon, Frankfort-on-the-Main, 1879;
- Rosenfeld, Sha'at ha-Kosher, in Aḥiasaf, 5659 (1899), pp. 71-80.
