= Zundel Salant =

Ashkenazi rabbi and teacher

Rabbi Yosef Zundel of Salant
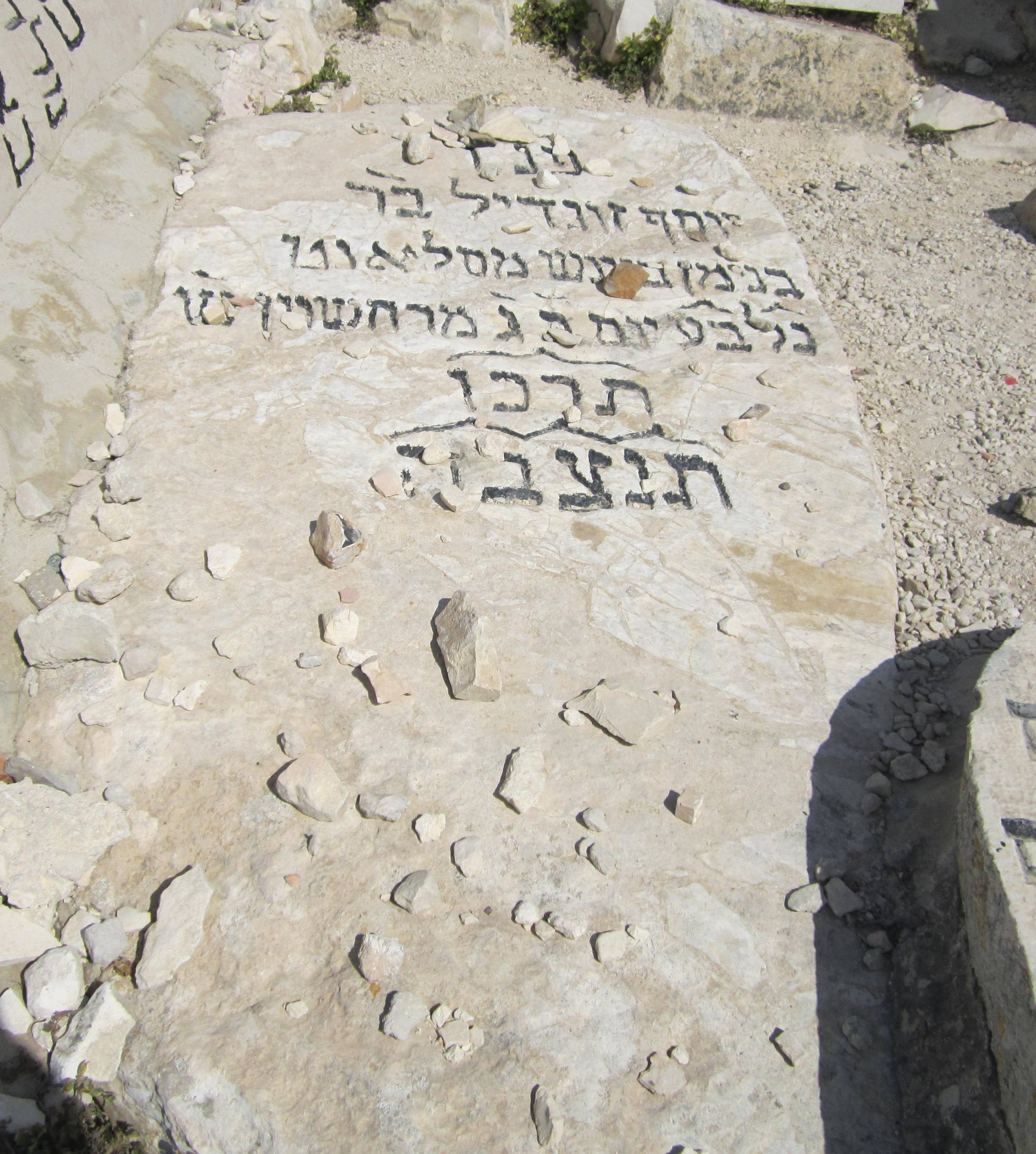
- Grave on the Mount of Olives

Personal life
- Born: 1786 Salantai, Duchy of Samogitia, Grand Duchy of Lithuania
- Died: October 12, 1866 (aged 79–80) Jerusalem, Jerusalem Sanjak, Damascus Eyalet, Ottoman Empire
- Education: Volozhin Yeshiva
- Known for: Teacher of Rabbi Yisrael Salanter
- Occupation: Rabbi

Religious life
- Religion: Judaism

Yosef Zundel of Salant (1786–1866; also known as Zundel Salant) was an Ashkenazi rabbi and the primary teacher of Rabbi Yisrael Salanter.

== Biography ==
=== Early life and family ===
Zundel was born on the first day of Rosh Hashana in 1786 (September 22 or 23) in Salantai, Lithuania. He descended from Rabbi Faivush Ashkenazi of Vilna (late 17th-early 18th century) and his father was Rabbi Benyamin Beinush, who was a shochet (kosher slaughterer) and hazzan (cantor) in Salant.

As a young man, Zundel studied in the Volozhin Yeshiva under Rabbi Chaim Volozhin. Following Volozhin's death in 1821, Zundel made trips to study with Rabbi Akiva Eiger.

He and his wife, Rochel Rivkah, had two daughters, Tziviah and Heniah, and a son, Aryeh Leib. Zundel did not accept any rabbinical positions and ran a small business which produced only a meager living.

=== Later life and impact ===
Zundel's student, Rabbi Yisrael Salanter, was the founder of the Musar movement.

In the late 1830s, Zundel settled in Jerusalem, where, at the urging of Rabbi Lehren, he served as the rabbi of the Ashkenazi community. For centuries, all disputes in Halakha (Jewish law) disputes and queries in Jerusalem were brought to the Sephardi Beth din (rabbinical court). Due to the recent growth of the Ashkenazi community, Lehren wanted Ashkenazim to have their own court. Zundel opened the court, as a temporary court.

In 1841, he appointed his son-in-law Rabbi Shmuel Salant to the court and soon made him the head of it, a position that he held for almost seventy years until his death in 1909.

Zundel lived in a small one-room apartment and sustained himself and his family by selling vinegar but spent most of the day and night in the Menachem Zion Synagogue, which was completed in 1837.

=== Death ===
He died in an epidemic on Friday, October 12, (3rd Cheshvan) 1866 and was buried on the Mount of Olives.
