= Naftali Amsterdam =

Lithuanian rabbi

Rabbi Naftali Amsterdam
- נפתלי אמסטרדם
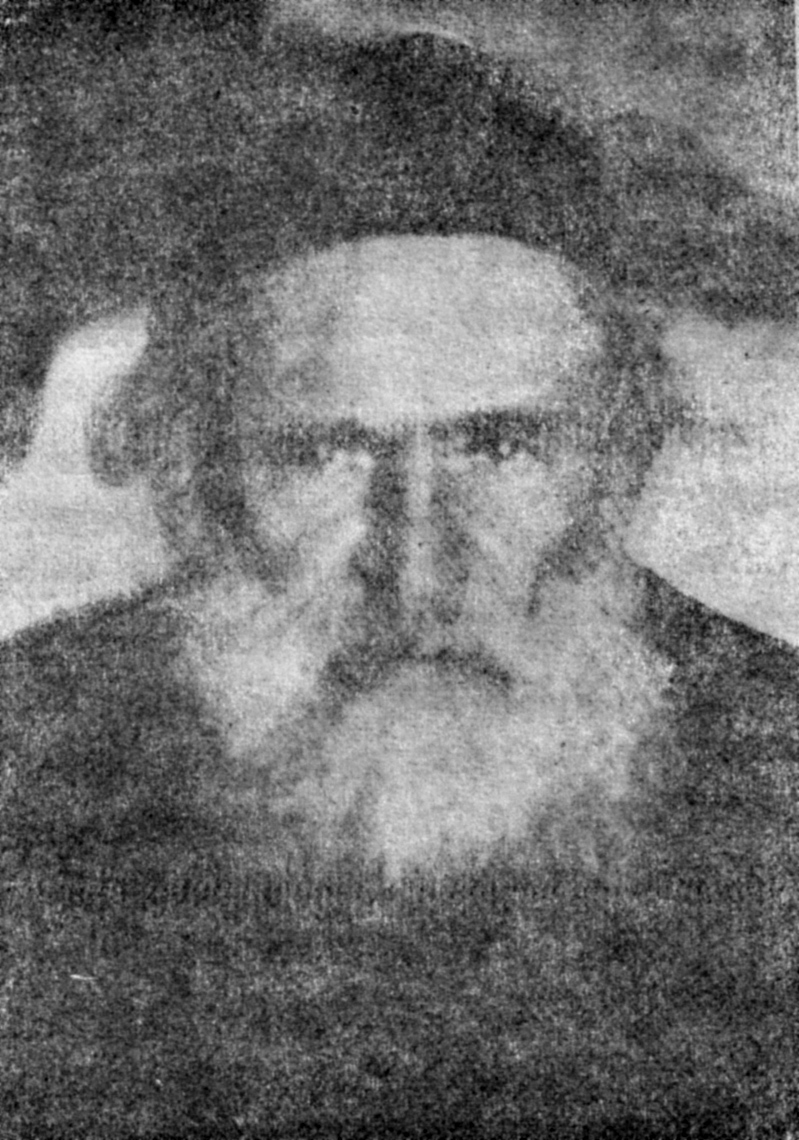
- Born: 1832; Salantai (Salant), Lithuania
- Died: February 10, 1916; Jerusalem
- Burial place: Mount of Olives
- Occupation: Av Bais Din
- Parent: Shlomo Amsterdam

Naftali Amsterdam (Hebrew: נפתלי אמסטרדם; 1832–1916) was a Lithuanian-born Orthodox rabbi and a leader in the Mussar movement.

== Mussar movement role ==
A student of Rabbi Yisroel Salanter, the Mussar movement's founder, his teacher categorized the roles of three top followers as:

- Rabbi Yitzchok Blazer ("Reb Itzele Peterburger"): scholar
- Rabbi Simcha Zessel Ziv Broida: sage
- Rabi Naftali Amsterdam: pietist

== Biography ==
Amsterdam was a rabbi and lived in

- Helsinki, 1867–1876
- St. Petersburg, 1876–1880
- Lithuania, 1880–1906 (Av Bais Din in Novograd)
- Jerusalem, 1906–1916. He moved to Ottoman Palestine shortly after the death of his wife.

He was buried on the Mount of Olives.
