= Musar movement =

Jewish ethical self-improvement movement

The Musar movement (Hebrew: תְּנוּעַת הַמוּסָר, romanized: tnūʿat ha-Mūsar; also spelled Mussar) is an ethical, educational, and cultural movement in Judaism that developed in 19th-century Lithuania, particularly among Orthodox Lithuanian Jews. Musar (Biblical Hebrew: מוּסָר) is derived from Proverbs 1:2, wherein the author of the book of Proverbs uses the term to describe moral behavior, instruction, and discipline, with an emphasis on educating oneself about how to act properly. The term was used by the originators of the Musar movement to convey teachings regarding ethical and spiritual paths found in the Musar literature (סִפְרוּת הַמוּסָר, sifrūt ha-Mūsar). The Musar movement made significant contributions to the Musar literature and Jewish ethics. The movement was revived in the 21st century among Jews of all denominations, particularly in Canada and the United States.

== Origin ==
The Musar movement arose among non-Hasidic Misnagdim Orthodox Lithuanian Jews as a response to the social changes brought about by the Enlightenment and the corresponding Haskalah movement among many European Jews. In this period of history, anti-Semitism, assimilation, and the impoverished living conditions of many Jews in the Pale of Settlement caused severe tension and disappointment. Many of the institutions of Lithuanian Jewry were beginning to break up. Religious Jews feared that their way of life was slipping away from them, observance of traditional Jewish law and custom was on the decline, and even those who remained loyal to the tradition were losing their emotional connection to its inner meaning and ethical core.

Although the modern Mussar movement is associated with Rabbi Yisroel Salanter, the broader tradition of Mussar literature long predated the nineteenth century. Ethical and spiritual self-development themes appeared in earlier Jewish works, including Pirkei Avot, Bahya ibn Paquda's Duties of the Heart, Maimonides' Shemoneh Perakim, and later medieval and kabbalistic ethical writings. According to later Mussar writers, Rabbi Salanter's contribution was to systematize these earlier traditions into a structured movement focused on ethical self-improvement and character development.

== Early leaders ==
The founding of the Musar movement is attributed to Rabbi Yisrael Lipkin Salanter (1810–1883), although the roots of the movements drew on ideas previously expressed in classical rabbinical literature.

=== Rabbi Yisrael Salanter ===
Yisrael Lipkin Salanter, a promising young rabbi with exceptional knowledge of Jewish law living in Salantai, Lithuania, was initially inspired to dedicate his life to the cause of spreading Musar by his teacher Rabbi Yosef Zundel Salant (1786–1866). Zundel Salant was a student of rabbis Chaim Volozhin and Akiva Eiger, whose profoundly good-hearted and humble behavior and simple lifestyle attracted Yisrael Salanter's interest. Zundel Salant was said to urge Salanter to focus on Musar.

Widely recognized as a rabbi of exceptional talent, Yisrael Salanter became head of a yeshivah in Vilna, where he quickly became well known in the community for his scholarship. He soon resigned this post to open up his own yeshiva, in which he emphasized moral teachings based on the ethics taught in traditional Jewish rabbinic works, especially Musar literature. Salanter referred to his approach as the Musar approach, using the Hebrew word for ethical discipline or correction.

In seeking to encourage the study of Musar literature, Salanter had three works of Musar literature republished in Vilna: Mesillat Yesharim by Moshe Chaim Luzzatto, Tikkun Middot ha-Nefesh by Solomon ibn Gabirol, and Cheshbon Ha-Nefesh by Menachem Mendel Lefin.

He particularly concentrated on teaching Jewish business ethics, saying that just as one checks carefully to make sure his food is kosher, so too should one check to see if his money is earned in a kosher fashion.

Rabbi Salanter set an example for the Lithuanian Jewish community during the cholera epidemic of 1848, ensuring that necessary relief work on Shabbat for Jews was done by Jews (despite the ordinary prohibition against doing work on Shabbat), and ordering Jews whose lives were in danger to eat rather than fast on the fast day of Yom Kippur.

In 1848, the Czarist government created the Vilna Rabbinical School and Teachers' Seminary. Salanter was identified as a candidate to teach at the school, but he refused the position and left Vilna. Salanter moved to Kovno, where he established a Musar-focused yeshiva at the Nevyozer Kloiz.

In 1857, he moved to Germany. By this time, his own students from Kovno had begun to set up their own yeshivot in Kelme, Telz, and elsewhere. Salanter later helped to found another institution, the Kovno Kollel.

In Germany, Salanter founded a periodical entitled Tevunah, dedicated in part to Musar. Many of Rabbi Salanter's articles from Tevunah were collected and published in Imrei Binah (1878). His Iggeret ha-Musar ("ethical letter") was first published in 1858 and then repeatedly thereafter. Many of his letters were published in Or Yisrael ("The Light of Israel") in 1890 (edited by Rabbi Yitzchak Blazer). Many of his discourses were published in Even Yisrael (1883).

Salanter also wrote "An Essay on the Topic of Reinforcing Those who Learn our Holy Torah," published by his students in a collection of essays titled Etz Pri. This essay is important for its exploration of the concept of the subconscious, well before the concept was popularized by Sigmund Freud. In Salanter's essay, the concept of conscious ("outerness" [chitzoniut]) and subconscious ("innerness" [penimiut]) processes and the role they play in the psychological, emotional and moral functioning of man is developed. Salanter explains that it is critical for a person to recognize what his subconscious motivations [negiot] are and to work on understanding them. He also teaches that the time for a person to work on mastering subconscious impulses was during times of emotional quiet, when a person is more in control of his thoughts and feelings. Salanter stresses that when a person is in the middle of an acute emotional response to an event, he is not necessarily in control of his thoughts and faculties and will not have access to the calming perspectives necessary to allow his conscious mind to intercede.

Scholar Hillel Goldberg and others have described Salanter as a "psychologist" as well as a moralist.

=== Second generation ===
After Salanter's death, the Musar movement was led by his disciples, who developed the movement in various ways.

Salanter's eldest disciple, Rabbi Simcha Zissel Ziv, directed yeshivas in Kelme and Grobin. These yeshivas broke with established models of yeshivot in a number of ways, especially by devoting significant time to the study of musar and by teaching general, non-Jewish studies. Simcha Zissel also wrote discourses that deeply engaged questions of moral virtue and gave particular attention to the importance of love for others.

A second student of Salanter's, Rabbi Yitzchak Blazer became the chief rabbi of St. Petersburg in 1861–1862; he later led the Kovno kollel. Blazer also published many of Salanter's writings.

A third leading disciple of Salanter, Rabbi Naftali Amsterdam, became the chief rabbi of Helsinki.

=== Third generation ===
In the following generation, leaders of the Musar movement included Zissel's student Nosson Tzvi Finkel of Slabodka, and Rabbi Yosef Yozel Horwitz of Novaradok. The schools founded by these two men became the largest and most influential schools of Musar. The Slobodka school founded by Finkel became especially influential, but the Novaradok school also gained a significant following. Louis Jacobs has described the difference between these two schools as follows:

In Slabodka they taught: man is so great, how can he sin? In Navaradok they taught: man is so small, how dare he sin?

== Controversy ==
In later years, opposition to the Musar movement developed in some segments of the Orthodox community. Many opposed the new educational system that Yisrael Salanter set up, and others charged that deviations from traditional methods would lead to assimilation as expected in classical German Reform Judaism.

In 1897, Eliezer Gordon, of the Telshe yeshiva, hired a new Musar supervisor, Rabbi Leib Chasman, who instituted a very strict Musar regime in the yeshiva. Many of the students opposed this approach, which caused dissent among the student body. At the same time, dissent against Musar also broke out at the Slobodka Yeshiva. A group of Lithuanian rabbis then published a declaration in the Hebrew newspaper Ha-Melitz in opposition to the study of Musar. According to the YIVO Encyclopedia of Jews in Eastern Europe,

they argued that while the study of moral texts was venerable if distinctly limited element of Torah study, the sainted Salanter himself surely had had no intention of overturning traditional priorities and certainly not of creating a new sect that was itself contributing to that collapse of traditional Jewish life which it claimed to combat. This set in motion a wave of similar declarations, counterdeclarations, and polemics for and against Musar in the Hebrew press which reverberated throughout traditional circles. Eventually a sort of equilibrium emerged, with Musar remaining a feature of many yeshivas and its most heartfelt advocates and opponents finding for themselves distinct but congenial venues.

== After World War II ==
Many of the Jews involved in the Musar movement were killed in the Holocaust. Hillel Goldberg has written that it was only before World War II that Musar was "still a living community."

Some students of the Musar movement, however, settled in the land of Israel and established Musar yeshivas there.

While many former students of the Musar movement settled in the United States and were involved in a variety of Jewish institutions, they established few formal institutions dedicated to Musar during the 20th century.

Many traditional yeshivas throughout the world, however, continued to allot some time during the week for Musar, and this continues today. This time is often dedicated to the study of Musar literature.

== 21st century revival ==
At the start of the 21st century, a significant revival of interest in the Musar movement has occurred in North America in various sectors of the Jewish world.

The Mussar Institute, founded by Alan Morinis and afterwards led by Avi Fertig, has over 7,000 members and 400 chaveirim who meet for musar study. Within the Orthodox community, the AishDas Society, founded by Rabbi Micha Berger, and the Salant Foundation, founded by Rabbi Zvi Miller, organize Musar groups, classes and other teaching events. Orthodox rabbis Yechiel Yitzchok Perr, Hillel Goldberg, Elyakim Krumbein, Avi Fertig, David Jaffe and Micha Berger have published English books about various aspects of Musar. The founders of both The Mussar Institute and the AishDas Society found inspiration in Rabbi Hillel Goldberg's English work, The Fire Within: A Living Heritage of the Musar (1987). Dr. Alan Morinis, founder of The Mussar Institute, writes "it was the introduction to my spiritual lineage....it holds a special place (for me)." Micha Berger notes it was the book that inspired him to explore musar, a topic already central to his life as founder of the AishDas Society.

Though the Musar movement was a historically Orthodox Jewish movement, its approach has gained significant traction among non-Orthodox Jews, who have spearheaded much of its 21st century revival. The Mussar Institute and the Center for Contemporary Mussar, founded by Rabbi Ira F. Stone, are among the institutions which have sought to spread the practice of Musar in a non-Orthodox framework. Morinis' book Everyday Holiness (2007) and Stone's book A Responsible Life (2007) were among the popular books that sparked contemporary interest in the Musar movement. Musar has been described as "an emerging and growing phenomenon" within Reform Judaism, and leaders of Conservative Judaism have debated whether Musar should stand at the center of its approach. Geoffrey Claussen of Elon University has argued that the Musar movement's conception of Jewish practice may be especially valuable for Conservative Judaism. Greg Marcus of the organization American Mussar has said that Musar can be accessible to many American Jews who don't speak any Hebrew, and can be adapted to the spiritual needs of American Jews.

Some Musar groups have no connection with synagogues; however, a number of synagogues have started programs for the study of Musar. There are also online communities dedicated to the exploration of Musar and character trait development.

Musar practice has been incorporated into the curriculum at Jewish day schools such as the Gann Academy and at rabbinical schools such as the Academy for Jewish Religion (California) and the Reconstructionist Rabbinical College.

Some teachers have recommended the practice of Musar not only for Jews but also among non-Jews. The website of the Mussar Institute said:

The Orthodox Jewish community spawned Musar to help people overcome the inner obstacles that hinder them from living up to the laws and commandments—the mitzvot—that form the code of life. That community tends to see Musar as inseparable from its own beliefs and practices, but the human reality Musar addresses is actually universal, and the gifts it offers can be used by all people."

== Study and practice ==
The Musar Institute website says:

Musar is a path of contemplative practices and exercises that have evolved over the past thousand years to help an individual soul to pinpoint and then to break through the barriers that surround and obstruct the flow of inner light in our lives. Musar is a treasury of techniques and understandings that offers immensely valuable guidance for the journey of our lives.... The goal of Musar practice is to release the light of holiness that lives within the soul. The roots of all of our thoughts and actions can be traced to the depths of the soul, beyond the reach of the light of consciousness, and so the methods Musar provides include meditations, guided contemplations, exercises and chants that are all intended to penetrate down to the darkness of the subconscious, to bring about change right at the root of our nature.

Musar practices include text study, meditation, silence and retreat, diary practices, chanting (nigunim), contemplation, visualization, tzedakah, and doing good deeds on behalf of others.

=== Musar literature ===
One of the central practices of the Musar movement was studying and meditating on classical musar literature including:

- Chovot HaLevavot, by Bahya ibn Paquda (11th century)
- Ma'alot HaMiddot, by Yehiel ben Yekutiel Anav of Rome
- Mesillat Yesharim, by Moshe Chaim Luzzatto
- Orchot Tzaddikim (The Ways of the Righteous), by an anonymous author
- Tomer Devorah (The Palm Tree of Deborah) by Moses ben Jacob Cordovero
- Shaarei Teshuvah (The Gates of Repentance) by Yonah Gerondi
- Madreigat Ha'Adam by Yosef Yozel Horwitz
- Cheshbon HaNefesh (Accounting of the Soul) by Menachem Mendel Lefin of Satanov
- "The Musar Letter" of the Vilna Gaon

=== Meditation ===
The Musar Movement has encouraged a number of Jewish meditation practices using introspection and visualization that could help to improve moral character. Many meditation techniques were described in the writings of Rabbi Simcha Zissel Ziv. Alan Morinis, the founder of the Mussar Institute, recommends morning meditation practices that can be as short as four minutes. One of the meditations recommended by Morinis is the practice of focusing on a single word: the Hebrew word Sh'ma, meaning "listen".

=== Nigunim and Chant ===
The Musar movement has also encouraged the chanting of nigunim, based on the realization of how music affects the inner life. In the 19th century, the Musar movement developed its own distinctive nigun chanting traditions. In the 21st century, nigunim may be used at the start and the end of musar study sessions and may help to create an emotional musar experience.

=== Charity ===
Musar writings describe giving charity as a central obligation and a central way to cultivate the character trait of generosity.

=== Giving musar ===
"Giving musar" (discipline, instruction) refers to a way to use one's speech to correct, admonish, or reprove others (Leviticus 19:17), in line with a verse from Proverbs 1:8: "Hear, my child, the discipline (musar) of your father, and do not forsake the teachings of your mother." Shimon Schwab taught that although at times "you must give musar" the command to do so (Lev. 19:17) is followed by love your neighbor as yourself, and that "if you want ..(someone)... to change, (it must be) done through love."

Giving musar may also happen through a formal lecture known as a musar shmuz or musar shiur, which are often part of a yeshiva curriculum. Elya Lopian taught the practice as "teaching the heart what the mind already understands."

== See also ==
- Ethics
- Jewish ethics
- Jewish meditation
- Musar literature
- Rabbinic literature § Musar literature

== Bibliography ==
Studies of the 19th/20th-centuries Musar movement

- Bacon, Gershon C. (2005). "Musar Movement". In Jones, Lindsay (ed.). Encyclopedia of Religion: 15 Volume Set (2nd ed.). Detroit, Mi: MacMillan Reference USA – via Encyclopedia.com.
- Karz, Dov (1977). The Musar Movement: Its History, Leading Personalities, and Doctrines. Vol. 1. Translated by Leonard Oschry. Tel Aviv: Orly Press.
- Rabbi Israel Salanter and the Musar Movement, Immanuel Etkes (Jewish Publication Society, 1993).
- Rabbi Israel Salanter: Religious-Ethical Thinker, Menahem G. Glenn (Dropsie College, 1953).
- Israel Salanter, Text, Structure, Idea: The Ethics and Theology of an Early Psychologist of the Unconscious, Hillel Goldberg (KTAV, 1982).
- Sharing the Burden: Rabbi Simhah Zissel Ziv and the Path of Musar, Geoffrey Claussen (SUNY Press, 2015).

Contemporary works adapting the Musar movement's teachings

- The Book of Jewish Values, Joseph Telushkin (Bell Tower, 2000).
- The Fire Within: The Living Heritage of the Musar Movement, Hillel Goldberg (Mesorah, 1987).
- A Responsible Life: The Spiritual Path of Musar, Ira F. Stone (Aviv Press, 2006).
- Climbing Jacob's Ladder: One Man's Rediscovery of a Jewish Spiritual Tradition, Alan Morinis (Broadway Books, 2002).
- Everyday Holiness: The Jewish Spiritual Path of Musar, Alan Morinis (Trumpeter Books, 2007).
- Every Day, Holy Day: 365 Days of Teachings and Practices from the Jewish Tradition of Musar, Alan Morinis (Trumpeter Books, 2010).
- The Handbook to Jewish Spiritual Renewal: A Path of Mussar Transformation for the Modern Jew, Rabbi Arthur Segal (Amazon Books, 2009).
- The Mussar Torah Commentary: A Spiritual Path to Living a Meaningful and Ethical Life, Barry Block ed. (CCAR Press, 2020).
