= Yitzchak Blazer =

R Itzele married the mother of R Moshe Shatskesz becoming his stepfather

- יצחק בלאזר
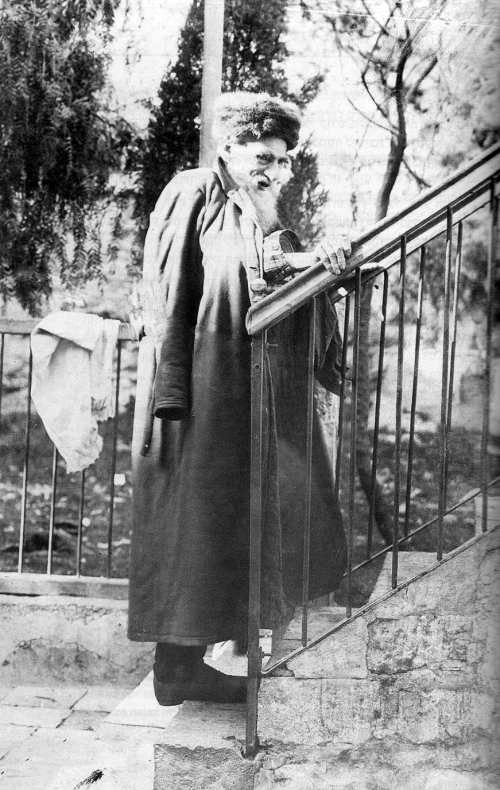
- Born: 1837 near Vilnius, Russia
- Died: 1907 (aged 69–70); Palestine, Ottoman Empire
- Notable work: Pri Yitzchak

Yitzchak Blazer (Hebrew: יצחק בלאזר) (1837–1907) was an early important leader of the Musar movement.

He is also sometimes referred to as Rabbi Itzele Peterburger due to his position as Chief Rabbi of St. Petersburg at a time when it was the capital of Russia. he married the mother of the Lomza Rav, Rabbi Moshe Shatskesz when his father was niftar becoming the stepfather of Rabbi Moshe Shatzkes.

== Background ==
Blazer was a student of Rabbi Yisroel Salanter, founder of the Musar movement, under whose direction he was appointed Chief Rabbi of St. Petersburg at the age of 25.

== Career ==
Among Blazer's accomplishments, in addition to his own authorship of Pri Yitzchak, a halakhic responsa text, was the publishing of many of Salanter's letters in Or Yisrael ("The Light of Israel"), as well as articles on Musar, Teshuvah, and the life of his teacher, Rabbi Yisrael Salanter. He also authored Kochvei Ohr.

From 1880 to approximately 1891, he served as the head of the Kovno Kollel in Kaunas, Lithuania, which was founded by Salanter. Under Blazer's direction, the kollel came to be "considered by its contemporaries as a bastion of the Mussar movement," a Jewish ethical movement based in Lithuania within the Russian Empire, and was attacked by the Musar movement's opponents.

He later joined Nosson Tzvi Finkel in leading the Slabodka Yeshiva.

Rabbi Yosef Yozel Horwitz was one of the primary pupils of Rabbi Blazer.

== Later years ==
In 1904 he emigrated to Jerusalem, where Rabbi Shmuel Salant was Chief Rabbi; during Blazer's last three years they worked together on several communal and charitable projects. Blazer died on 11 Av 5667 (July 21 or 22, 1907).
