= Shmuel Salant =

Polish-Israeli rabbi (1816–1909)

Rabbi Shmuel Salant
- שמואל סלנט
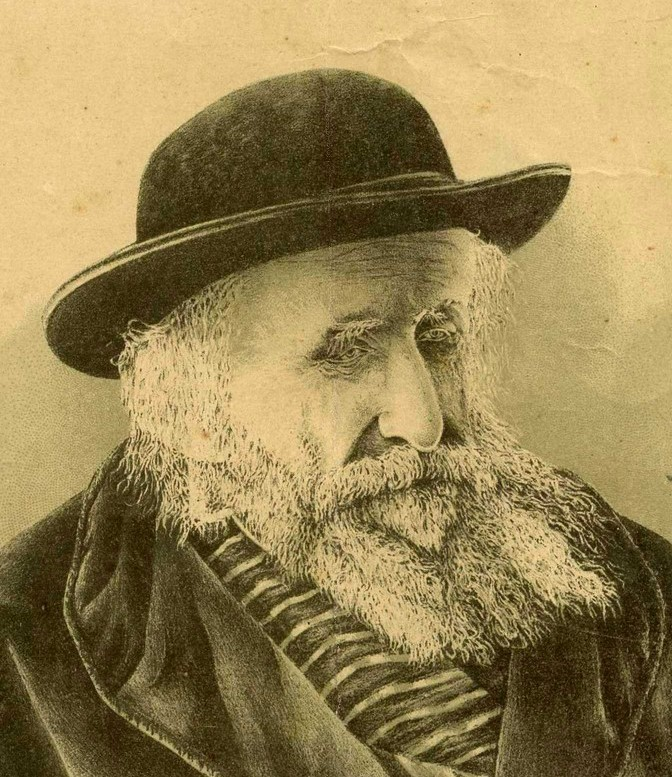
- c. 1903

Personal life
- Born: February 1, 1816 Białystok, Russian Empire (now Poland)
- Died: August 16, 1909 August 16, 1909 (aged 93) Jerusalem
- Buried: Mount of Olives
- Spouse: 1. Fruma Shapiro; 2. Toiva; 3. Rosha-Dreiza; 4. Chaya Hirshberg
- Children: Binyamin Beinush; Chaya (Bardekey); Rebeka (Hirshberg)
- Parent(s): Tzvi & Raisa Salant

Religious life
- Religion: Judaism
- Denomination: Orthodox

Jewish leader
- Predecessor: Rabbi Meir Auerbach
- Successor: Rabbi Chaim Berlin
- Position: Ashkenazi Chief Rabbi of Jerusalem
- Residence: Jerusalem, Mandatory Palestine

Shmuel Salant (Hebrew: שמואל סלנט; February 1, 1816 – August 16, 1909) served as the Ashkenazi Chief Rabbi of Jerusalem for almost 70 years. He was a renowned Talmudist and Torah scholar.

== Early life ==
Shmuel Salant was born in Białystok, then part of the Russian Empire, to Tzvi and Raisa (their surname is unknown). After marrying Toiba (Yonah), the eldest daughter of Rabbi Yosef Zundel of Salant, he adopted his father-in-law's surname. At an early age his lungs became damaged, and he was advised to seek a warm climate. This induced him in 1840 to go with his wife and son Binyomin Beinish to Jerusalem.

== Jewish communal activism ==
En route, in Constantinople, he met and gained the friendship of Sir Moses Montefiore, then on his way to defend the Jews falsely accused in the Damascus Blood Libel. Salant arrived in Jerusalem in 1841, rejoining his father-in-law and about 500 other Ashkenazim who had preceded him. From 1848 to 1851 he served as a meshulach (fund-raiser), visiting the principal cities of Lithuania and Poland to collect money for the impoverished Jews of the Old Yishuv. This age-old practice was termed the Chaluka.

In 1860, Salant travelled to Germany, Amsterdam, and London to collect funds. Upon his return to Jerusalem, he succeeded in ensuring that his contributions were equally divided between the Sephardim and Ashkenazim. He also collected donations for the building of the Beis Yaakov Synagogue in Jerusalem.

Also in 1860, a time of universal poverty and hardship, Rabbi Salant founded the Rabbi Meir Baal Haneis Salant charity together with his father-in-law, Rabbi Yosef Zundel Salant. Its purpose was to provide for all of Israel's poor and impoverished, Sefardi and Ashkenazi alike.

== Rabbinic career ==
In 1871, Salant succeeded Rabbi Meir Auerbach as chief rabbi of the Ashkenazim. Rabbis Salant and Auerbach highly supported that the Balady citron cultivated in the Arab village of Umm el-Fahm, was the most kosher to be used as etrog in the four species during the festival of Sukkot.

Salant was regarded as a distinguished Talmudist and an excellent and learned leader. Many of the halachic (legal) positions are known through the prodigious writing of his student and grandson by marriage, Rabbi Yechiel Michel Tucazinsky. Salant was also known for his moderation and tolerance of all classes of Jews. As Ashkenazic chief rabbi, he was on friendly terms with his Sephardic counterpart, Chief Rabbi Yaakov Shaul Elyashar, and they generally acted in harmony concerning the welfare matters of the community.

Salant was instrumental in the establishment of the Etz Chaim Yeshiva in Jerusalem. He also helped found Bikur Cholim Hospital and encouraged people to move into new neighborhoods outside the Old City walls. During his tenure as chief rabbi, the Jewish population of Jerusalem grew from 5,000 to 30,000.

In 1888, Salant's eyesight began to fail, and a few years later he became blind. In 1900, he requested an assistant. Rabbi Eliyahu David Rabinowitz-Teomim, known as the Aderet, a renowned rabbi and author, had just arrived in Israel from Russia. He was immediately selected for the position, but predeceased Salant in 1905.

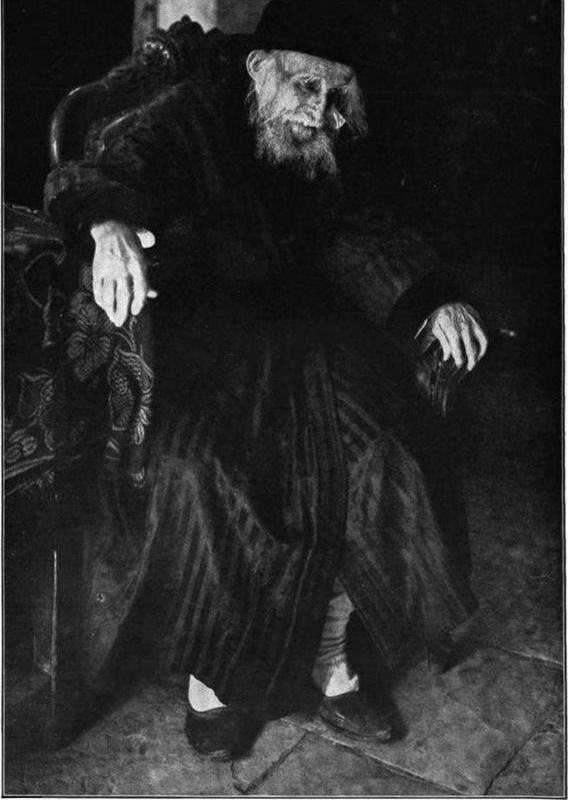
Rabbi Salant, as photographed for Pearson's Magazine in July 1909

Salant died in Jerusalem on Monday, 16 August 1909 (29 Av 5669) aged 93 and was buried on the Mount of Olives. Rabbi Tucazinsky writes that though funerals in Jerusalem are generally performed within the same day or night as the passing, Salant's was an exception. He died at night and the funeral was not held until daybreak because the Rabbis were concerned that the massive attendance to a nighttime funeral procession would lead to injuries or worse. His gravestone was made from a pillar that had stood in the Hurva courtyard where he lived in the Old City.

== Legacy ==
In 2006, Salant was memorialized on an Israeli postage stamp.

Salant's memory was invoked during the 2011 political lobbying of his direct relative, New York State Senator Stephen Saland, by local chareidi Agudah leadership in opposition to legalization of same sex marriage and the Marriage Equality Act.

A descendant of his is Knesset member Yoav Kish.
