= Israel Salanter =

Russian Jewish rabbi (1809–1883); father of the Musar movement

Rabbi Yisrael Lipkin Salanter

Personal life
- Born: November 3, 1809 Žagarė, Šiauliai County, Kovno Governorate, Russian Empire (present-day Lithuania)
- Died: February 2, 1883 (aged 73) Königsberg, Kingdom of Prussia, German Empire
- Occupation: Rabbi, Rosh yeshiva

Religious life
- Religion: Judaism
- Main work: Imrei Binah, Iggeres HaMusar, Ohr Yisrael, Even Yisrael, Etz Peri
- Other: Founder of the Musar movement

Yisrael ben Ze'ev Wolf Lipkin, also known as Israel Salanter or Yisroel Salanter (November 3, 1809 – February 2, 1883), was the father of the Musar movement in Orthodox Judaism and a famed Rosh yeshiva and Talmudist. The epithet Salanter was added to his name since most of his schooling took place in Salant (now the Lithuanian town of Salantai), where he came under the influence of Rabbi Yosef Zundel of Salant. He was the father of mathematician Yom Tov Lipman Lipkin.

== Biography ==
Yisroel Lipkin was born in Zagare, Lithuania on November 3, 1809, the son of Zev Wolf, the rabbi of that town and later Av Beth Din of Goldingen and Telz, and his wife Leah. As a boy, he studied with Rabbi Tzvi Hirsh Braude of Salant.

After his 1823 marriage to Esther Fega Eisenstein Lipkin settled with her in Salant where he continued his studies under Hirsch Broda and Zundel, himself a disciple of Chaim Volozhin.

Around 1833 he met the decade-younger Alexander Moshe Lapidos, who became his lifelong student and friend.

Around 1842, Lipkin was appointed rosh yeshiva (dean) of Meile's yeshiva (Tomchai Torah) in Vilna. When a minor scandal arose related to his appointment, he left the post to its previous inhabitant and moved to Zaretcha, an exurb of Vilna, and established a new yeshiva where he lectured for about three years.

Jewish law prohibits doing certain categories of work on Shabbat (the Jewish Sabbath) except in life-threatening emergencies. During the cholera epidemic of 1848 Lipkin ensured that any necessary relief work on Shabbat for Jews was done by Jews. Although some wanted such work to be done on Shabbat by non-Jews, Lipkin said that both Jewish ethics and law mandate that the obligation to save lives takes priority over other laws. During Yom Kippur (the Day of Atonement), Lipkin ordered that Jews that year must not abide by the traditional fast, but instead must eat in order to maintain their health, again for emergency health reasons.

In 1848, the Czarist government created the Vilna Rabbinical School and Teachers' Seminary. Lipkin was identified as a candidate to teach at or run the school. As he feared that the school would be used to produce rabbinical "puppets" of the government, he refused the position and left Vilna. Salanter moved to Kovno, where he established a Musar-focused yeshiva at the Nevyozer Kloiz.

In 1857 he left Lithuania and moved to Prussia. He remained in the house of philanthropists, the Hirsch brothers of Halberstadt, until his health improved. In 1861 he started publication of the Hebrew journal Tevunah, devoted to rabbinical law and religious ethics. After three months the journal had failed to garner enough subscriptions to cover its costs, so he closed it.

Lipkin lived for periods in Memel, Königsberg and Berlin. Toward the end of his life, Lipkin went to Paris to organize a community among the many Russian Jewish immigrants, and he remained there for two years.

Lipkin was one of the first people to try to translate the Talmud into another language. However, he died before he could finish this immense project. Lipkin died on Friday, February 2, 1883 (25 Shevat 5643), in Königsberg, then part of Germany. For many years, the exact location of his grave was unknown. Following a lengthy investigation, in 2007 the grave was located in Königsberg.

In order to be able to legally travel outside of the Pale of Settlement, he became a master dye-maker, enabling him to receive a permit allowing free travel within Russia.

When the Russian Empire established military conscription of young Jewish men, Lipkin wrote to rabbis and community leaders urging them to obey and make lists of young men for the government while working through political connections in St. Petersburg to abolish the conscription.

== Teachings ==
Lipkin was known as the father of the Musar movement that developed, particularly among the Lithuanian Jews, in 19th century Orthodox Eastern Europe. The Hebrew term musar (מוּסַר), is from the book of Proverbs 1:2 meaning instruction, discipline, or conduct. The term was used by the Musar movement to refer to disciplined efforts to further ethical and spiritual development. The study of Musar is a part of the study of Jewish ethics.

Lipkin is best known for stressing that the inter-personal laws of the Torah bear as much weight as other Divine obligations. According to Lipkin, adhering to the ritual aspects of Judaism without developing one's relationships with others and oneself was an unpardonable parody. There are many anecdotal stories about him that relate to this moral equation, see for example the following references.

The concept of the unconscious appears in the writings of Lipkin well before the concept was popularized by Sigmund Freud, though its discussion predates Lipkin as well. Already in 1880, the concept of conscious and subconscious processes and the role they play in the psychological, emotional and moral functioning of man are fully developed and elucidated. These concepts are referred to in his works as the "outer" [chitzoniut] and "inner" [penimiut] processes, they are also referred to as the "clear" [klarer] and "dark" [dunkler] processes. They form a fundamental building block of many of Rabbi Salanter's letters, essays and teachings. He would write that it is critical for a person to recognize what his subconscious motivations [negiot] are and to work on understanding them.

Lipkin would teach that the time for a person to work on not allowing improper subconscious impulses to affect him was during times of emotional quiet, when a person is more in control of his thoughts and feelings. He would stress that when a person is experiencing an acute emotional response to an event, he is not necessarily in control of his thoughts and faculties and will not have access to the calming perspectives necessary to allow his conscious mind to intercede.

Based on his understanding of subconscious motivation, Lipkin was faced with a quandary. Given that a person's subconscious motivations are often not apparent or under the control of a person and are likely to unseat conscious decisions that they may make, how is it then possible for a person to control and modify their own actions in order to improve their actions and act in accordance with the dictates of the Torah? If the basis of a person's actions are not controlled by them, how can they change them through conscious thought?

Lipkin argued that the only solution to this dilemma is to study ethical teachings with intense emotion [limud hamusar behispa'alut]. He taught that a person should choose an ethical statement [ma'amar chazal] and repeat this over and over with great feeling and concentration on its meaning. Through this repetition and internal arousal, a person would be able to bring the idea represented in the ethical teaching into the realm of his subconscious and thus improve their behaviour and "character traits".

Lipkin felt that people would be embarrassed to study ethical teachings [limud ha'musar] in such a way in a normal study-hall [bet ha'medrash] and he therefore invented the idea of a "house of ethical teachings" [bet ha'mussar] that would be located next to an ordinary study hall and that would be designated for learning ethics in this way.

One of the more popular teachings of Lipkin is based on a real life encounter he had with a shoemaker one very late night. It was Motza'ei Shabbat (Saturday night after Shabbat) and Lipkin was on the way to the synagogue to recite Selichot. Suddenly he felt a tear in his shoe, so he looked around town to see if there was a shoemaker still open for business at this late hour. Finally he located a shoemaker sitting in his shop working next to his candle. Lipkin walked in and asked him, "Is it too late now to get my shoes repaired?" The shoemaker replied, "As long as the candle is burning, it is still possible to repair." Upon hearing this, Lipkin ran to the synagogue and preached to the public what he had learned from the shoemaker. In his words, as long as the candle is burning, as long as one is still alive, it is still possible to repair one's soul.

== Famous disciples ==
Lipkin believed that accomplishment in spiritual growth is not limited to rabbinic figures but is also the realm of the ordinary layman. Therefore, his closest disciples included not only leading rabbis of the next generation but also laymen who would come to exert a tremendous positive influence on the physical and spiritual lot of their brethren. Nevertheless, there is little detailed information available concerning his non-rabbinic disciples.

Among Lipkin's most famous students were:

- Naftali Amsterdam (נפתלי אמשטרדאם)
- Yitzchak Blazer
- Eliezer Gordon
- Jacob Joseph
- Yerucham Perlman
- Simcha Zissel Ziv
- Yosef Yozel Horwitz

His layperson disciples included figures such as the banker Eliyahu (Elinka) of Kretinga and the tea magnate, Kalman Zev Wissotzky.

== Published works ==
Many of his articles from the journal "Tevunah" were collected and published in Imrei Binah (1878). His Iggeres HaMusar ("Ethical Letter") was first published in 1858 and then repeatedly thereafter. Many of his letters were published in Ohr Yisrael ("The Light of Israel") in 1890 (edited by Yitzchak Blazer). His disciples collected many of his discourses and published them in Even Yisrael (1853) and Etz Peri (1881).

== Bibliography ==
- Etkes, Immanuel. Rabbi Israel Salanter and the Musar Movement. Jewish Publication Society. ISBN 0-8276-0438-6.
- Finkelman S. The story of Reb Yisrael Salanter; the legendary founder of the musar movement. New York, New York: Mesorah Publications, . ISBN 0-89906-798-0.
- Goldberg, Hillel. The Fire Within: The living heritage of the Musar movement. Artscroll/Mesorah. 1987.
- Goldberg, Hillel. Israel Salanter, text, structure, idea: the ethics and theology of an early psychologist of the unconscious. KTAV Publishing House. ISBN 0-87068-709-3.
