= Friedländer =

Friedländer (Friedlander, or Friedlaender) is a toponymic surname derived from any of German places named Friedland.

The surname may refer to:

== People ==
=== Friedländer ===
- Adolf Albrecht Friedländer (1870–1949), Austrian neurologist and psychiatrist
- Adolph Friedländer (1851–1904), German lithographer, printer of circus posters and magazines
- Albert Friedländer (1888–1966), German bank director, later French and Swiss author
- Benedict Friedlaender (1866–1908), German sexologist, sociologist, and physicist
- Carl Friedländer (1847–1887), German pathologist and microbiologist
- David Friedländer (1750–1834), German writer, manufacturer
- Eitan Friedlander (born 1958), Israeli Olympic sailor
- Friedrich Friedländer (1825–1901), Czech-German Jewish painter
- Gerhart Friedlander (1916–2009), German chemist
- György Szepesi-Friedländer (1922), Hungarian radio personality and sports executive
- Johnny Friedlaender (1912–1992), graphic artist, painter
- Julius Friedländer (disambiguation)
- Ludwig Friedländer (1824–1909), German philologist
- Margot Friedländer (1921–2025), German survivor of the Holocaust and public speaker
- Marguerete Friedländer (1896–1985), German and American ceramist
- Max Friedländer (disambiguation)
  - Max Jakob Friedländer (1867–1958), German museum curator and art historian
- Michael Friedländer (1833–1910), Orientalist and principal of Jews' College, London
- Michael W. Friedlander (1928–2021), American physicist
- Oskar Friedländer, Austrian philosopher
- Paul Friedländer (disambiguation)
- Rebecca Friedländer (1783-1850), German novelist and short-story writer
- Richard Friedländer (1881–1939), German Jewish merchant
- Salomo Friedlaender (1871–1946), German philosopher
- Saul Friedländer (born 1932), Israeli historian
- Thekla Friedländer (born 1849, death unknown), German soprano and social reformer
- Vera Friedländer (1928–2019), German writer and Holocaust survivor
- Walter Friedländer (1873–1966), art historian

=== Friedlander ===
- Albert Friedlander (1927–2004), American rabbi
- Beau Friedlander, American writer, publisher, and media consultant
- Camilla Friedländer (1862–1928), Austrian painter
- Dagobert Friedländer (1826–1904), banker and member of the House of Lords of Prussia
- Elizabeth Friedländer (1903–1984), German born designer
- Eric Friedlander (born 1944), American mathematician
- Erik Friedlander (born 1960), American musician
- Ernie Friedlander (born 1935), Holocaust survivor and is Australian-Jewish activist
- Erwin Friedlander (1925–2004), American expert in high-energy nuclear physics
- Frederick Gerard Friedlander (1917–2001), German British mathematician
- Günther Friedländer (1902–1975), pharmacist, botanist, pharmacognosist, food chemist, and industrialist
- Hans-Peter Friedländer (1920–1999), Swiss football forward
- Hedwig Friedländer (1856–1937), Austrian painter
- Henry Friedlander (1930–2012), German-American historian
- Hugo Friedlander (1850s–1928), New Zealand businessman and local politician
- Isaac Friedlander (1823–1878), wheat broker and California land speculator
- Israel Friedlander (1876–1920), American rabbi
- John Friedlander, Canadian mathematician
- Judah Friedlander (born 1969), American comedian
- Judith Friedlander, Professor of anthropology
- Julius Reinhold Friedlander (1803–1839), German-American educator
- Kate Friedlander (1902–1949), psychoanalyst
- Lanny Friedlander (1947–2011), American publisher
- Lee Friedlander (born 1934), American photographer
- Lee Friedlander (film director), American film director
- Leo Friedlander (1888–1966), American sculptor
- Leslie Friedlander, cantor
- Louis Friedlander (1901–1962), American independent film and television director known as Lew Landers
- Liz Friedlander, American film, music video and television director
- Marcus Friedlander, American rabbi
- Marti Friedlander (1928–2016), New Zealand photographer
- Matthew Friedlander (born 1979), South African cricketer
- Michael Friedlander (disambiguation)
- Miriam Friedlander (1914–2009), American politician
- Michal Friedlander, cultural historian and museum curator
- Mona Friedlander (1914–1993), British pilot
- Shems Friedlander (1940–2022), American Islamic scholar, Sufi master, visual artist, filmmaker, author and professor
- Susan Friedlander (born 1946), American mathematician
- Tony Friedlander (born 1944), New Zealand politician
- Tzvi Hersh Friedlander, Liske Hasidic rebbe
- William B. Friedlander (1884–1968), American songwriter and theater producer

=== Friedlaender ===
- Ann Fetter Friedlaender (1938–1992), American economist
- Henri Friedlaender (1904–1996), Israeli typographer and book designer
- Helmut Friedlaender (1913–2008), American lawyer, financial adviser, and book collector

== Characters ==
- Isiah Friedlander, minor character from Grand Theft Auto V
- Sharon Friedlander, Marvel Comics character
