= Natan Friedland =

Proto-Zionist rabbi

Rabbi Nathan Friedland
- נתן פרידלנד
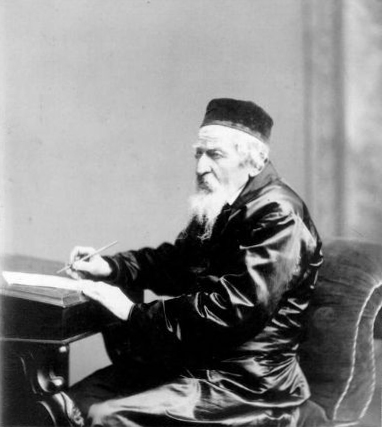
- c. 1880
- Born: 1808; Tauragė, Russian Empire (now Lithuania)
- Died: March 27, 1883 (aged 74–75); Jerusalem
- Burial place: Mount of Olives Jewish Cemetery
- Education: Zvi Hirsh Broide of Salant; Zundel Salant
- Occupations: Writer; maggid (itinerant preacher)
- Known for: Collaboration with Zvi Hirsch Kalischer for the promotion of early religious Jewish settlement of Palestine
- Movement: Proto-Zionism; Hibbat Zion

Natan Friedland (Hebrew: נתן פרידלנד; 1808 – 27 March 1883) was a Russian-born rabbi, writer, maggid (itinerant preacher), and proto-Zionist activist. A devotee of the 19th-century Hibbat Zion (lit. 'affection for Zion') movement, he was instrumental, together with Zvi Hirsch Kalischer, in helping to lay the ideological groundwork for a movement to return the Jews to the Land of Israel in order to usher in the Messianic Age.

== Early life ==
Natan Friedland was born in Tauragė (also spelled Taurig or Towrig), Russian Empire (now Lithuania). At a young age, he travelled to nearby Salantai in order to study the Torah under the guidance of that town's foremost teachers — Zvi Hirsh Broide and Zundel Salant. The latter, himself a student of Chaim of Volozhin, was in turn a student of the Vilna Gaon, a sage who imbued his students with a longing for the Land of Israel. This environment instilled in Friedland a sense of a need for action in the cause of Jewish redemption. Salant himself emigrated to Palestine in 1838, and eventually played a significant role in strengthening the Jewish community of Jerusalem.

== Proto-Zionist activism ==
Friedland first became interested in history and current events through the reading of German-Jewish newspapers. The Damascus affair in particular — well documented in those publications — left a strong impression on Friedland regarding the apparent helplessness of Jewish communities in the diaspora. Friedland eventually became determined to help lay the ideological groundwork for a movement to return the Jews to the Land of Israel in order to usher in the Messianic Age. He felt that this goal was to be accomplished in stages; once Jews began to settle there through land acquisition and the introduction of agriculture, they would achieve quasi-independence under the reigning power. In due course, they would become fully independent. While he believed that the Messianic Age was imminent, Friedland surmised that it would come about through natural means rather than miracles. He believed that it would take an international campaign for this to happen. At the time, he was unaware that any of his contemporaries, such as Judah Alkalai, might be holding similar views.

Friedland soon became a travelling preacher who visited synagogues across Lithuania, becoming the first Zionist preacher and delivering his sermons in Hebrew. He took up writing in order to circulate his ideas to an even wider audience, with his output eventually becoming some of the most influential proto-Zionist works of the Hibbat Zion (lit. 'affection for Zion') movement of the mid-1880s. In 1858, while he was in Toruń promoting his book Kos Yeshuah VeNehamah (lit. 'cup of redemption and consolation'), Friedland first became aware of Zvi Hirsch Kalischer, who after making his acquaintance, wrote an enthusiastic approbation for Friedland's book. From then on, Friedland became Kalischer's faithful aide, organizing committees and collecting funds through a "Corporation for Settling the Land of Israel."

Friedland transmitted a petition to Napoleon III in person, concerning establishing Jewish independence in Palestine. Napoleon responded by letter, writing that owing to political considerations with the Ottomans, an immediate step was impossible; but as the situation changed; he would act upon it. Friedland approached the king of the Netherlands to solicit his help for the project. He travelled to Paris to try and meet Adolphe Crémieux, but his meeting with the minister came to naught. While there, Friedland entreatied the prominent rabbis of Paris and France for their support, receiving from them letters of recommendations and encouragement. He then went to London to see Moses Montefiore. While this meeting was more promising, Montefiore was not overly enthusiastic about the proposals. Friedland then met with Albert Cohn, head of charitable affairs for the Rothschild family, subsequently writing to Kalischer, with the latter sending his manuscript expounding upon his views on the Land of Israel to Cohn. England's chief rabbi Nathan Adler gave Friedland his encouragement.

== Personal life and death ==
In 1870, Friedland was lacking adequate funds to support his and his brother's family (the latter had died in Jerusalem). Nearly destitute and lacking funds for travel, he nevertheless continued his writing, his travels and his campaigning. In 1871 he published a pamphlet in German called Settling the Land of Israel, at the end of which he wrote an essay stressing that living in the diaspora was unsafe since the Jews were subjugated to the whims of the local rulers.

In 1881, in London, Friedland met with a Lord Shaftsberry, head of the British Missionary Association, and Elizabeth Finn widow of a former council to Jerusalem who sought to establish an association for settling Jews in Syria. Though too old to lead this expedition himself, he suggested that his son Michael lead it. Michael was a rabbi and shochet (kosher slaughterer) who had written a commentary on the laws of Kashrut. Michael eventually lead an expedition to Latakia in Syria but was expelled by the Ottomans to Cyprus. (Michael Friedland's son's name was claimed to have been on a plaque on the synagogue he established. This is unlikely as his two attempts to settle Cyprus failed with the colonists left destitute - with no buildings left.) Meanwhile, Natan Friedland managed to get permission to enter the port of Jaffa. He died in Jerusalem in 1883 and is buried in the Mount of Olives Jewish Cemetery.

== Works ==
While Friedland did not have that much to show for all of his travels and advocacy, in 1860 a campaign was started by Hayim Luria of the Jewish community of Frankfurt to create an association which collected money for the cause of Zion. The campaign utilized Kalischer's pamphlet, Derishat Zion and Friedland's own work, Kos Yeshuah VeNehamah as ways to disseminate their ideas. Friedland crystallized his own proto-Zionist views of God's system for the Messianic Age in this work. Lehman-Wilzig contends that Friedland's book required Kalischer's analysis to clarify it. Luria's association eventually became defunct, so Kalischer and Eliyahu Guttmacher took it upon themselves to resuscitate it. Friedland collaborated with Kalischer on a new edition of the latter's book, and also wrote a new one of his own, only the last section of which was published as Solu Solu HaMesilah. Friedland's collected writings, including his most popular work Kos Yeshuah VeNehamah, were translated from the Yiddish to Modern Hebrew.
