= Friedland =

Friedland may refer to:

== Places ==
=== Czech Republic ===
- Frýdlant v Čechách (Friedland im Isergebirge)
- Frýdlant nad Ostravicí (Friedland an der Ostrawitza)
- Frýdlant nad Moravicí (Friedland an der Mohra)

=== France ===
- Avenue de Friedland, street in Paris

=== Germany ===
- Friedland, Mecklenburg-Vorpommern
- Friedland, Brandenburg
- Friedland, Lower Saxony, a municipality in Göttingen
- Friedland (Amt)

=== Poland ===
- Korfantów (Friedland in Oberschlesien)
- Mieroszów (Friedland in Niederschlesien)
- Debrzno (Preußisch Friedland)
- Mirosławiec (Märkisch Friedland)

=== Russia ===
- Pravdinsk (Friedland in Ostpreußen), called Friedland 1917–1945

== Other ==
- Friedland (surname)
- Duchy of Friedland, duchy of Albrecht von Wallenstein 1627–1634
- Battle of Friedland, during the Napoleonic Wars in 1807
  - French ship Friedland for ships named after the battle

== See also ==
- Friedländer
