= Musolino =

Musolino is a surname. Notable people with the name include:

- Benedetto Musolino (1809–1885), Italian politician and soldier
- Enrico Musolino (1928–2010), Italian speed skater
- Giuseppe Musolino (1876–1956), Italian brigand
- Vincenzo Musolino (1930–1969), Italian actor, director, producer and screenwriter

== See also ==
- Mussolini family
- Il Brigante Musolino, Italian biographical film about Giuseppe Musolino
