= Max Friedländer =

Max Friedländer may refer to:

- Max Friedländer (journalist) (1829–1872), Silesia-born Austrian journalist
- Max Friedlaender (musicologist) (1852–1934), Silesia-born German bass singer and musicologist
- Max Jakob Friedländer (1867–1958), Berlin-born German art historian
- Max Friedlaender (lawyer) (1873–1956), German lawyer

== See also ==
- Friedländer
