= Gávavencsellő =

Coordinates: 48°10′N 21°36′E

- Large Village
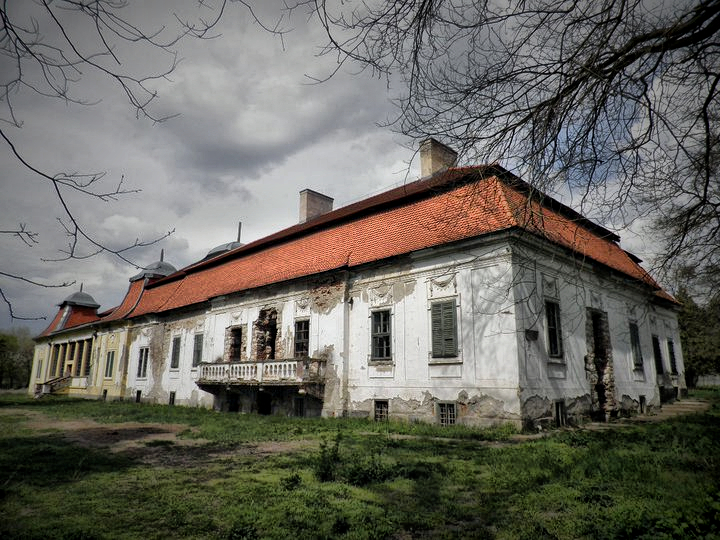
- Dessewffy Castle

- Flag Coat of arms
- Interactive map of Gávavencsellő
- Country: Hungary
- County: Szabolcs-Szatmár-Bereg

Area
  - Total: 66.83 km^{2} (25.80 sq mi)

Population (2001)
  - Total: 3,938
  - Density: 58.93/km^{2} (152.6/sq mi)
- Time zone: UTC+1 (CET)
  - Summer (DST): UTC+2 (CEST)
- Postal code: 4472
- Area code: 42

Location of Szabolcs-Szatmar-Bereg county in Hungary

Gávavencsellő is a large village in Szabolcs-Szatmár-Bereg county, in the Northern Great Plain region of eastern Hungary. The village was established in 1971 by merging the former separate villages of Gáva and Vencsellő.

== Geography ==
It covers an area of 66.83 km^{2} (26 sq mi) and has a population of 3,938 people (2001).

== History ==
In 1898, Rabbi Tzvi Hirsh Friedlander became the village chief rabbi until he was promoted as the chief rabbi of Olaszliszka, when his father Rabbi Chaim Friedlander died in 1906. Rav Tzvi Hirsh established a yeshiva, where about 40-60 students learned.

Rabbi Chaim said about his son becoming chief rabbi of Gava: "He is rav of Gava (=the city), but gava he does not possess".

== Notable residents ==
- András Kozák, film actor
- László Karakó, politician
- Theodore S. Weiss, politician
- László Vágner, footballer
