= Lawrence Friedman (disambiguation) =

Lawrence or Laurence Friedman, Freedman or Freeman may refer to:

- Harry Lawrence Freeman (1869–1954), American composer and conductor
- Bud Freeman (Lawrence Freeman, 1906–1991), American jazz musician
- Lawrence M. Friedman (born 1930), American law professor
- Larry Friedland (Lawrence Friedland, born 1938/1939), American property developer
- Sir Lawrence Freedman (born 1948), British professor of war studies, diplomacy, and international relations
- Laurence Freeman (born 1951), British Benedictine monk and priest
- Lawrence G. Friedman, author of the book that defines the go to market plan
