= Friedland (surname) =

Friedland is a surname of German and Ashkenazi Jewish origin. Notable people with the surname include:

- Adam Friedland (born 1987), American stand-up comedian and podcaster
- Anatole Friedland (1888–1938), composer, songwriter, vaudeville performer, and Broadway producer
- Dalia Friedland (born 1935), Israeli actress and singer
- David Friedland (born 1937), American lawyer and politician
- Georges Friedland (1910–1993), French screenwriter, film director and editor
- Jonathan Friedland (born 1960), British physician and medical researcher
- Kevin Friedland (born 1981), American soccer player
- Larry Friedland (born 1930s), American property developer
- Martin Friedland (born 1932), Canadian lawyer, academic, and author
- Michelle Friedland (born 1972), American judge
- Natan Friedland (died 1883), rabbi and member of the H'bat Tsion movement
- Robert Friedland (born 1950), American/Canadian financier
- Sherman Friedland (born 1933), professor
- Shmuel Friedland (born 1944), Israeli-American mathematician
- Valentin Friedland (1490–1556), German scholar and educationist of the Reformation
- William H. Friedland (1923–2018), American sociologist
