= Yehuda Bibas =

Sephardic rabbi (1789–1852)

Yehuda Aryeh Leon Bibas

Personal life
- Born: circa 1789 Gibraltar
- Died: April 6, 1852 Hebron, Mutasarrifate of Jerusalem, Ottoman Syria
- Buried: Old Jewish Cemetery in Hebron
- Occupation: Rabbi, physician

Religious life
- Religion: Judaism

Jewish leader
- Position: Precursor of modern Zionism
- Main work: Various odes, prayers, and sermons
- Yahrtzeit: 17th of Nisan

Rabbi Dr. Yehuda Aryeh Leon Bibas (or Judah Bibas) (Hebrew: יהודה אריה ליאון ביבאס) (c. 1789 – April 6, 1852) was a Sephardic rabbi, best known as one of the most prominent forerunners of the modern Zionist movement. He also served as the Chief Rabbi of Corfu, Greece.

== Biography ==
=== Early life ===
Bibas was born in Gibraltar to Sephardi Jews descended from those who were expelled from Spain and settled in North Africa. His father came from a line of rabbis in Tétouan that immigrated to Gibraltar after a pogrom. One of his maternal ancestors was Chaim ibn Attar.

As a child, Bibas studied in Gibraltar. Following his father's death, he moved to Livorno, Italy, to live with his grandfather. Livorno had a very prestigious and educated Jewish community. Bibas received in Livorno most of his Jewish and secular education, becoming fluent in English, Italian, Spanish and Hebrew. He became a rabbi and trained as a physician while in Italy. He later returned to Gibraltar and established himself as the head of a local yeshiva. His yeshiva was attended by students from England, Italy and North Africa.

In 1810, he came to London, England, where he met with Jewish activist and philanthropist Sir Moses Montefiore. Montefiore helped to fund Bibas's activism.

In 1831, Bibas was appointed as the Chief Rabbi of Corfu, Greece.

=== Proto-Zionist activism ===
In 1839–1840, Bibas visited many Jewish communities, particularly those of Europe. Inspired by the Serbian and Greek revolts against the Ottoman Turks, Bibas began advocating a mass repatriation of Jews to Israel (then part of the Ottoman Empire). In the same year, he met Judah Alkalai and became Alkalai's mentor. Alkalai went on to become an influential proto-Zionist himself.

=== Aliyah and death ===
In 1852, one year after his wife died, Bibas made aliyah and was welcomed by his students in Jaffa. Later, he moved to Hebron, established a seminary, and built his extensive library. He died two months after his arrival and was buried in the Old Jewish Cemetery in Hebron.

== Legacy ==
The Jewish community of Hebron used to hold a memorial ceremony for Bibas every year on Yom Kippur evening. This tradition ended with the 1929 Hebron massacre that forced nearly all the city's Jews to flee. In 2022, Israel's President Isaac Herzog commemorated Bibas on the 170th anniversary of his passing in a ceremony at the President's Residence calling him "one of the first forerunners of Zionism... his tremendous historical contribution has not received sufficient recognition." In Israel, a street in Jerusalem is named in his memory.

In 1953, Prof. Solomon Zeitlin made the claim that the Dead Sea Scrolls may have come from Bibas's library after having been looted during the 1929 Hebron massacre.

=== Burial location ===
In March 2025, the grave of Rabbi Yehuda Bibas was finally found after decades of attempts to locate it. It was understood that he had been buried in the Old Jewish Cemetery in Hebron, and that he was buried specifically in the section known as the "Rabbi's Plot," but little other information was clear.

The Jewish community of Hebron relied on oral traditions for grave locations and, following the 1929 Hebron massacre, much of their communal knowledge was lost. In 1967, there was an effort to identify as many of those buried in the ancient cemetery as possible. However, the specific location of Bibas's grave was not known until interest in him and finding his grave renewed in the years just prior to its discovery, prompting reexamination of existing evidence and further investigation.

== See also ==
- Theodor Herzl
