= Proto-Zionism =

19th century Jewish thinkers

Proto-Zionism (or Forerunner of Zionism; Hebrew: מְבַשְרֵי הציונות, pronounced: Mevasrei ha-Tzionut) is a concept in historiography describing Jewish thinkers active during the second half of the 19th century who were deeply affected by the idea of modern nationalism spreading in Europe at that time. They sought to establish a Jewish homeland in the Land of Israel. The central activity of these men took place between the years 1860 and 1874, before the establishment of practical Zionism (1881) and political Zionism (1896).

While in the 17th century the overall idea was raised, among Jews and non-Jews, of "restoring the Jews to Israel naturally by settlement and political action," the ultimate goal was not yet clearly defined.

Among those considered to be proto-Zionists are Yehuda Bibas (1789–1852), Judah Alkalai (1798–1878), Zvi Hirsch Kalischer (1795–1874), philosopher Moses Hess (1812–1875) and Moses Montefiore (1784–1885).

== Background ==
Muhammad Ali seized power of Ottoman Egypt in 1805 following a civil war between the reigning Mamluks and Ottomans. Muhammad Ali dreamed of a new Egypt rising from the ashes of Ottoman decline: "I am well aware that the (Ottoman) Empire is heading by the day toward destruction... On its ruins I will build a vast kingdom... up to the Euphrates and the Tigris". He envisioned the Levant as the bread basket of Egypt, supplying Egypt with agricultural production and conscripts for their wars against the Ottomans. Most of the Muslim Arab peasantry in Palestine turned against Ibrahim Pasha, Ali's eldest son and successor, as his constant demands for conscript soldiers came to be seen as a death sentence leading to the 1834 Peasants' revolt in Palestine. This was the backdrop against which proto-Zionism developed as more Jews started immigrating to the region under Ibrahim Pasha's rule. After the Ottomans regained control of the Levant in the Oriental Crisis of 1840, the legal structures of land ownership underwent significant reform as part of the Tanzimat era, beginning with the Land Code of 1858. Once based on cultivation, land ownership was now based on title and register, paving the way for later land purchases by Zionists.

== History ==
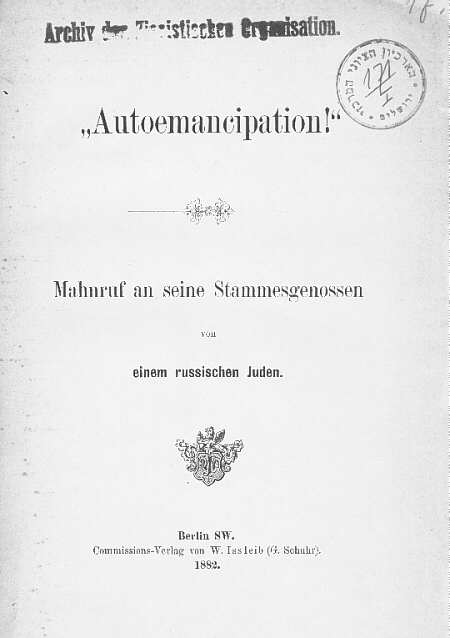
Auto-Emancipation by J. L. Pinsker, 1882

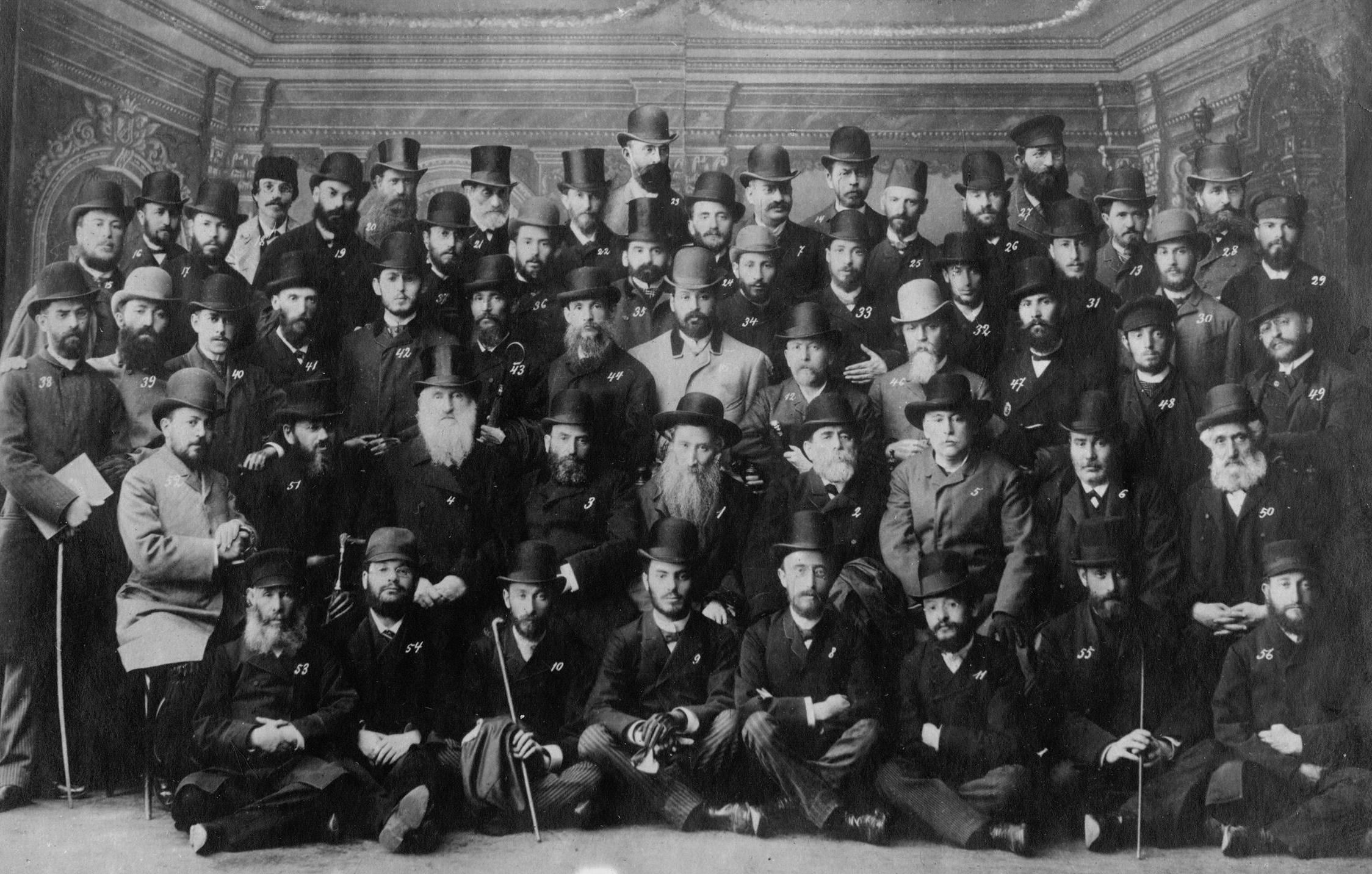
The first general assembly of the Society for the Support of Jewish Farmers and Artisans in Syria and Palestine, also known as the Odessa Committee, 1890

The forerunners of Zionism, rather than being causally connected to the later development of Zionism, are thinkers and activists who expressed some notion of Jewish national consciousness or advocated for the migration of Jews to Palestine. These attempts were not continuous as national movements typically are.

The medieval Jewish Torah scholar Maimonides advocated a re-establishment of Jewish sovereignty in the Land of Israel in a lengthy preface to his 13 principles of faith. He wrote that Jewish national independence would come about through natural means and argued for political activism to bring it about. Likewise, the medieval Jewish philosopher Judah HaLevi also espoused Proto-Zionist ideas, writing that only in the Land of Israel could Jews be truly secure.

According to Ben-Zion Dinur, the aliyah of Judah HeHasid and his group in 1700 inaugurated a new era during which processes such as encouraging productivity, the revival of the Hebrew language and national aspirations developed. Nahum Sokolow described proto-Zionists as anyone who wished to renew the Jewish community in the Land of Israel, or who wrote about the Jewish problem, starting from the 17th century. This broad definition included such figures as Moses Montefiore, Adolphe Crémieux, Eliezer Ben-Yehuda and Sabbatai Zevi. Nathan Michael Gelber also traced the forerunners of Zionism back to the 17th century.

According to Arie Morgenstern, the Vilna Gaon of Lithuania, Elijah ben Solomon Zalman (1720–1797), promoted a teaching from the Zohar (book of Jewish mysticism) citing the prediction that "the gates of wisdom above and the founts of wisdom below will open" would happen after the start of the 6th century of the 6th millennium i.e. after the year 5600 of the Jewish calendar (1839–1840 AD). Many understood this to imply the coming of the Messiah at that time. This early wave of Jewish migration to the Holy Land began in 1808 and crested in 1840. Although the Messiah did not appear, the Ottoman government took control of Palestine from the Egyptians in 1840, and its recently established rights for all Ottoman citizens—regardless of religion—was thus extended to the non-Muslim populations of Palestine, including the Jewish people there. The right to purchase and own land was a particularly significant, if less noticed, milepost in the return of the Jewish people to the Holy Land.

=== 19th century ===
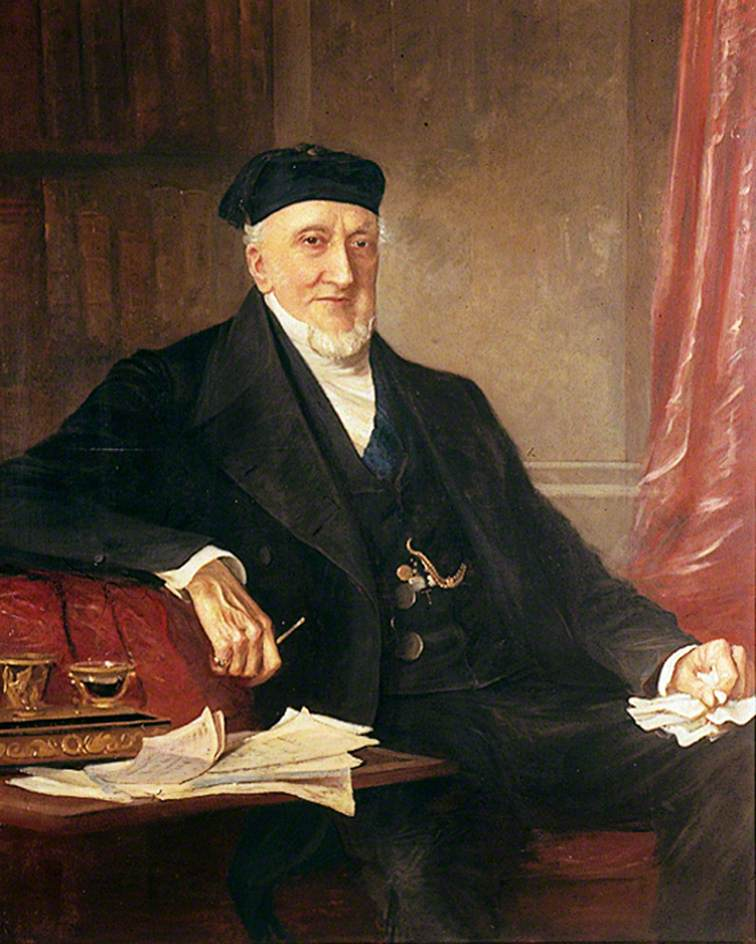
Moses Montefiore, c. 1868–1869

In the nineteenth century, there were a number of initiatives to create Jewish colonies or homelands in various places inside and outside Palestine. Jewish settlements were proposed for establishment in the upper Mississippi region by W.D. Robinson in 1819. Moral but not practical efforts were made in Prague by Abraham Benisch and Moritz Steinschneider to organise a Jewish emigration to Palestine in 1835. In the United States, Mordecai Manuel Noah attempted to establish a Jewish refuge opposite Buffalo, New York, on Grand Isle, 1825. These early Jewish nation building efforts failed.

The idea of returning to Palestine was rejected by various conferences of rabbis held in that epoch. Individual efforts supported the emigration of groups of Jews to Palestine, pre-Zionist Aliyah, even before the First Zionist Congress in 1897, the year considered as the start of practical Zionism. Moses Montefiore, who is viewed as a proto-Zionist, established a colony for Jews in Palestine. In 1854, his friend Judah Touro bequeathed money to fund Jewish residential settlement in Palestine. Laurence Oliphant failed in a like attempt to bring to Palestine the Jewish proletariat of Poland, Lithuania, Romania, and the Turkish Empire, his 1879 and 1882 entreaties to the sultan both being rejected.

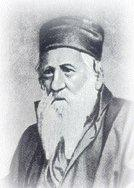
Judah Alkalai

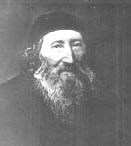
Zvi Hirsch Kalischer

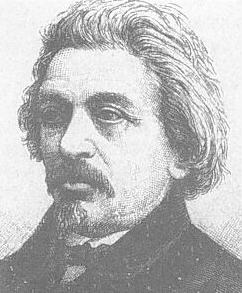
Moses Hess

The most notable proto-Zionists were rabbis such as Judah ben Solomon Hai Alkalai and Zvi Hirsch Kalischer. Their idea of Jews as a collective was strongly tied to religious notions distinct from the secular movement referred to as Zionism that developed at the end of the century. Jacob Katz argues that it is possible to point to three specific individuals as the "forerunners of Zionism": Rabbi Solomon Hai Alkalai, Rabbi Kalischer, and philosopher Moses Hess. Although other people acted in various forms, it is the actions of this triad that left their imprint on the Hovevei Zion. Samuel Leib Zitron cited Rabbi Alkalai as the pioneer of modern political Zionism.

Katz further argues that the Rabbis Alkalai and Kalisher changed their religious worldview, abandoning the "Basics of non-realistic perception of traditional Messianic views". He also explains that during their actions as forerunners of Zionism there "was not on the agenda an issue of lack of rights to Jews or social discrimination" and thus the modern idea of Jewish nationalism was not a success in the years they operated. From the late 1870s until the eve of World War I, with growing economic plight of Eastern European Jews and the rising wave of anti-Semitism, two and a half million Jews left Eastern Europe; only a small percentage of them emigrated to Israel.

Moses Hess, a former associate of Karl Marx and Friedrich Engels, is regarded as the first modern Jewish nationalist, advocated for the establishment of an independent Jewish state in pursuit of the economic and social normalization of the Jewish people. Hess believed that emancipation alone was not a sufficient solution to the problems faced by European Jewry. In 1862, he wrote Rome and Jerusalem. The Last National Question calling for the Jews to create a socialist state in Palestine as a means of settling the Jewish question. Also in 1862, German Orthodox Rabbi Kalischer published his tractate Derishat Zion, arguing that the salvation of the Jews, promised by the Prophets, can come about only by self-help. In 1882, after the Odessa pogrom, Judah Leib Pinsker published the pamphlet Auto-Emancipation (self-emancipation), arguing that Jews could only be truly free in their own country and analysing the persistent tendency of Europeans to regard Jews as aliens:

"Since the Jew is nowhere at home, nowhere regarded as a native, he remains an alien everywhere. That he himself and his ancestors as well are born in the country does not alter this fact in the least... to the living the Jew is a corpse, to the native a foreigner, to the homesteader a vagrant, to the proprietary a beggar, to the poor an exploiter and a millionaire, to the patriot a man without a country, for all a hated rival."

Citron and Samuel Ettinger, who argued that even if preceded by the movement of Hovevei Zion were different personalities who tackled the Jewish problem, the few acts that they were at hand to do did not leave an impression for generations, did not affect anything on the Zionist movement, and thus there is no person that could be called "harbinger of Zionism".

=== First Aliyah (1881–1903) ===
In the late 1870s, Jewish philanthropists such as the Montefiore and the Rothschilds responded to the persecution of Jews in Eastern Europe by sponsoring agricultural settlements for Russian Jews in Palestine. The Jews who migrated in this period are known as the First Aliyah. Aliyah is a Hebrew word meaning "ascent", referring to the act of spiritually "ascending" to the Holy Land and a basic tenet of Zionism.

The movement of Jews to Palestine was opposed by the Haredi communities who lived in the Four Holy Cities, since they were very poor and lived off charitable donations from Europe, which they feared would be used by the newcomers. Sephardi members of the Old Yishuv period, however, participated in the establishment of New Yishuv settlements. From 1800 there was a movement of Sephardi businessmen from North Africa and the Balkans to Jaffa and the growing community there perceived modernity and Aliyah as the key to salvation. Unlike the Haredi communities, the Jaffa community did not maintain separate Ashkenazi and Sephardi institutions and functioned as a single unified community.

Founded in 1878, Rosh Pinna and Petah Tikva were the first modern Jewish settlements.

Following a wave of anti-Jewish pogroms in the Russian Empire in 1881–1882, Jewish emigration accelerated. Most headed for the United States and elsewhere in the West, while a smaller number moved to Ottoman Palestine. So many Russian Jews arrived in Jaffa that the town ran out of accommodation and the local Jews began forming communities outside the Jaffa city walls. However, the migrants faced difficult living conditions, including unemployment, disease, and fear of violence, and about half ultimately left. One of the migrants in this period, Eliezer Ben-Yehuda set about modernising Hebrew so that it could be used as a national language.

Rishon LeZion was founded on 31 July 1882 by a group of ten members of Hovevei Zion from Kharkov (today's Ukraine). Zikhron Ya'akov was founded in December 1882 by Hovevei Zion pioneers from Romania. In 1887 Neve Tzedek was built just outside Jaffa. Over 50 Jewish settlements were established in this period.

In 1890, Ottoman Palestine was inhabited by about 532,000 people: 432,000 Muslims, 57,000 Christians, and 43,000 Jews. 60% of Jerusalem was Jewish at this time.

== Notable proto-Zionists ==
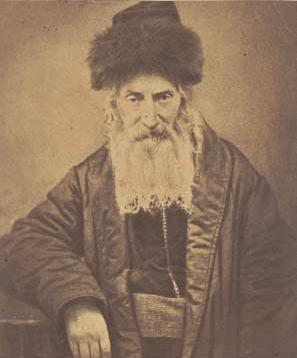
Rabbi Eliyahu Guttmacher

- The Vilna Gaon (1720–1797) was one of the chief promoters of the idea that the passage from the Zohar mentioned above indicated that the Messiah would return in 1840. Groups of his followers ("Perushim") started to arrive in the Holy Land in 1808.
- Eliyahu Guttmacher, rabbi and tzadik who was a supporter Kalischer and the Hovevei Zion movement.
- Judah Bibas was a Gibraltar-born Rabbi, who served as the Chief Rabbi of Corfu. Bibas visited Jewish communities all over Europe, and encouraged Jews to make Aliyah to Palestine.
- Moses Hess was influenced by the idea of modern nationalism and in 1862 published Rome and Jerusalem. Hess, who was secular and a former revolutionary socialist, rediscovered the cultural and political origins of Judaism, all in order to draw out ideas for the modern Jewish national movement.
- Yehuda Alkalai was a Sephardi rabbi from the Balkans and a student of Rabbi Yehuda Bibas who was infused with Christian ideas about the end of redemption and deeply influenced by the political success of Adolphe Crémieux and Moses Montefiore, as well as the Damascus affair.
- Zvi Hirsch Kalischer was a German of Polish origin who believed that the emancipation – the granting of equal rights to Jews, at least practically - was part of the process of redemption.
- In an 1819 letter to Mordecai Manuel Noah, former U.S. president John Adams expressed the wish that Jews would once again form an independent nation in Judea. He speculated that, with self-government and an end to persecution, they might eventually embrace liberal Unitarian Christianity.
- Napoleon I aimed to create a Jewish state in Palestine during his war in Egypt.
- Joseph Smith, founder of the Latter Day Saint movement, sent Orson Hyde to Jerusalem to consecrate the region for "the gathering of Judah's scattered remnants" in 1841. In his dedication, Hyde called for the restoration of the Davidic monarchy and to "constitute her people a distinct nation and government."
- Emma Lazarus was an American Jewish poet who called in 1882 for a repatriation of the Jews into Palestine.
- George Eliot was an English novelist who wrote in 1876 the novel Daniel Deronda which expressed proto-Zionist ideas.
- Some scholars describe Baruch Spinoza as a proto-Zionist.

== See also ==
- History of Zionism
- Pre-Modern Aliyah
- Return to Zion
- Yom HaAliyah
- Benedetto Musolino
