= Vera Friedländer =

German writer and Holocaust survivor (1928–2019)

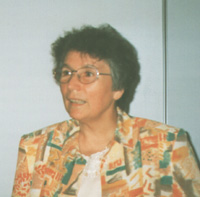
- Friedländer in 1996
- Born: Veronika Rudau; 27 February 1928; Woltersdorf, Brandenburg, Germany
- Died: 25 October 2019 (aged 91); Berlin, Germany
- Other name: Veronika Schmidt
- Occupation: Writer

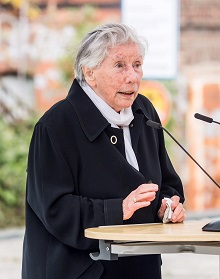
Friedländer in October 2018 at the memorial Track 17 of Berlin-Grunewald station

Vera Friedländer (born Veronika Rudau and also known as Veronika Schmidt; 27 February 1928 – 25 October 2019) was a German writer and Holocaust survivor. She was a great-great-granddaughter of Natan Friedland.

== Biography ==
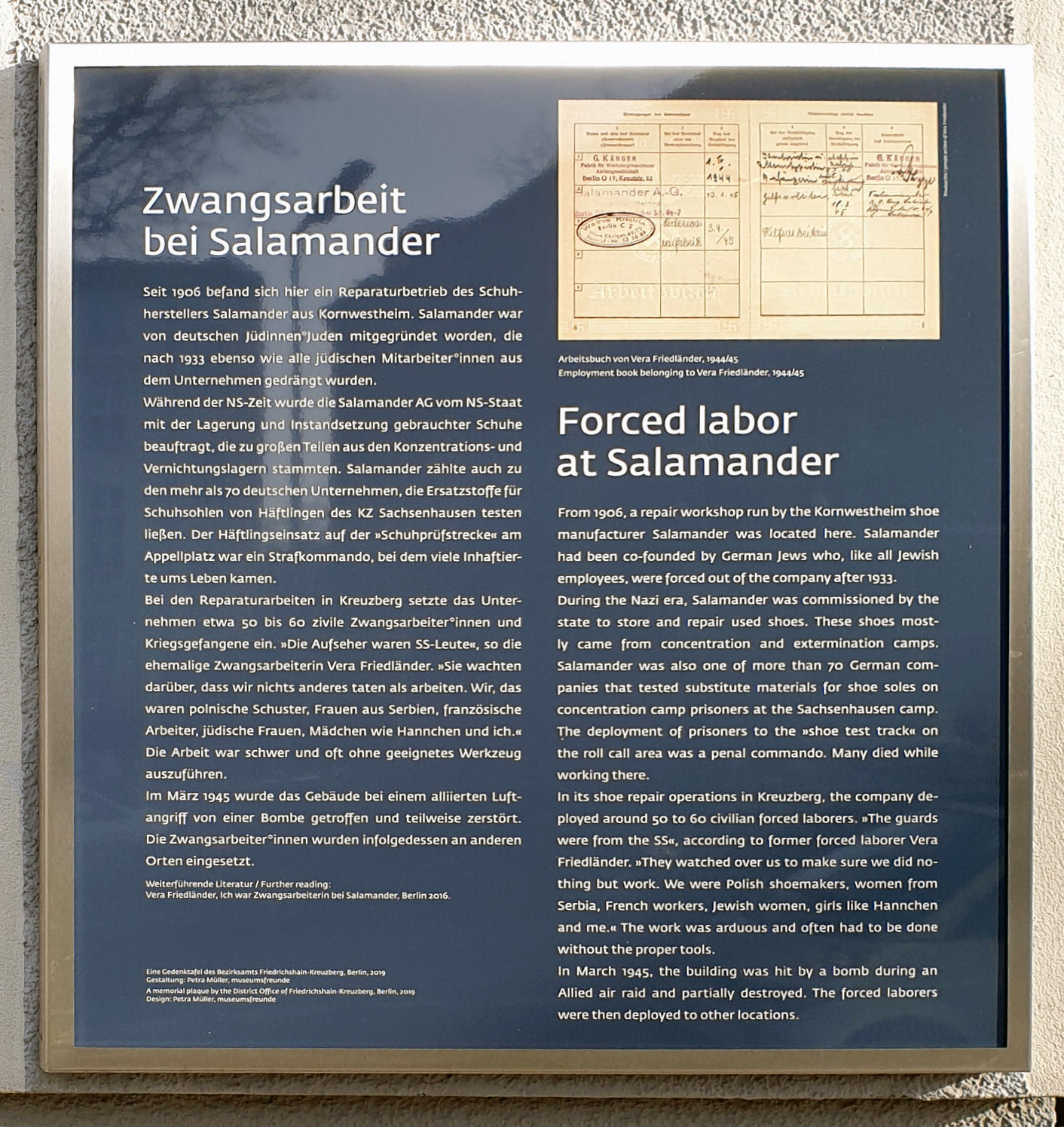
Memorial plaque "Forced labor at Salamander", in Berlin-Kreuzberg

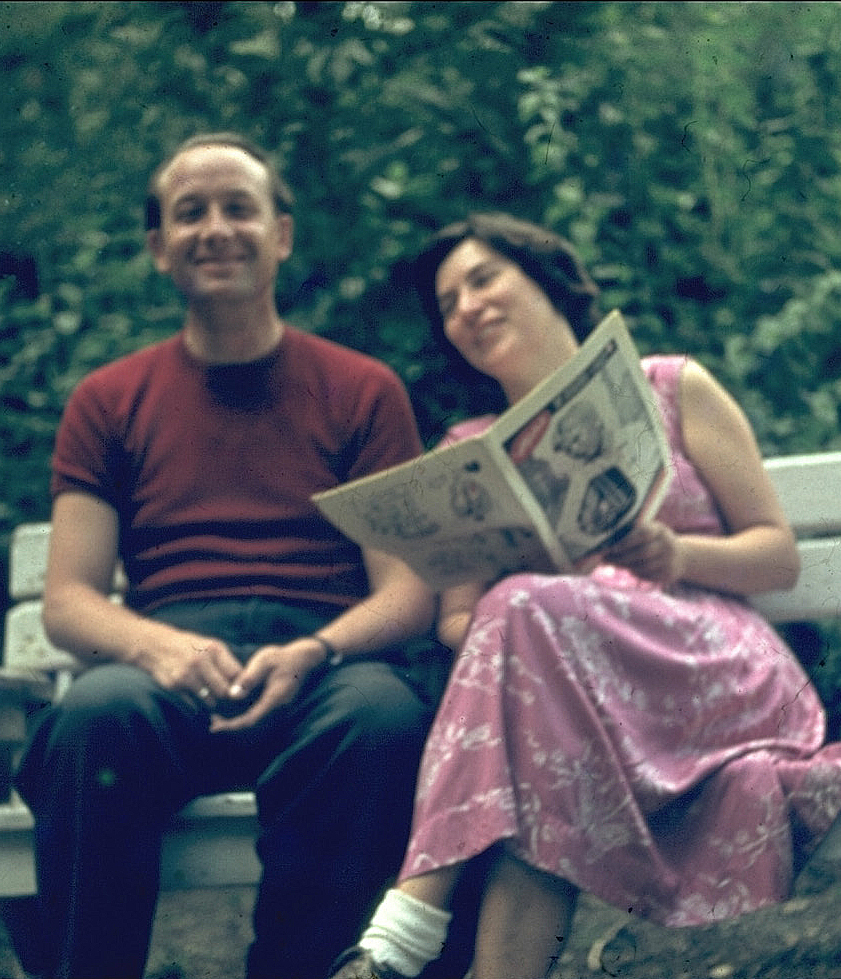
Veronika Schmidt with the literary magazine Die Schatulle in August 1958 (her husband Erwin is on the left)

Friedländer was born in Woltersdorf in 1928. Her mother was Jewish and her father was Christian, therefore she was persecuted as "half-Jewish" during the Nazi era and was a forced laborer. When her mother was arrested in early March 1943 as part of the "Fabrikaktion" in the Gestapo collection point Große Hamburger Straße in Berlin, she spent many hours with her father and other partners in mixed marriages waiting outside the collection point. Her mother was eventually released, however, many members of Friedländer's family were deported and murdered in Auschwitz, Theresienstadt and other places.

In 1945, Friedländer was forced to work, unpaid, sorting shoes at the Salamander shoe repair shop at Köpenicker Street 6a-7 in Berlin-Kreuzberg. She later learnt that the shoes had come from people who had been murdered in concentration camps.

After the war ended, she studied German language and literature, received her doctorate and studied at Humboldt University of Berlin. She worked first as editor of the literary magazine Die Schatulle from 1957 to 1960 and then at Humboldt University. In 1975 she and her husband went to Warsaw, where she taught at the University of Warsaw. In 1982 she won the Jacob and Wilhelm Grimm Prize. From 1982 to 1986 she held a professorship for German language at Humboldt University.

In 1990, she was co-founder of the Jüdischer Kulturverein Berlin (Jewish cultural association of Berlin). With the support of the association, she founded a German language school in Berlin, among others for Jewish immigrants from Eastern Europe – Friedländer School. Friedländer worked in forced labor research at the Berliner Geschichtswerkstatt (Berlin history workshop) and was actively involved in the Stolperstein project.

Since 2009, there has been a play entitled Vera, which is based on her texts and in which she herself appeared on stage with an independent theatre group for a time.

In the late 1980s and early 1990s, Friedländer worked as an author for Die Weltbühne, among other things. In 2012 an article by her was published in the magazine Ossietzky.

== Death and legacy ==
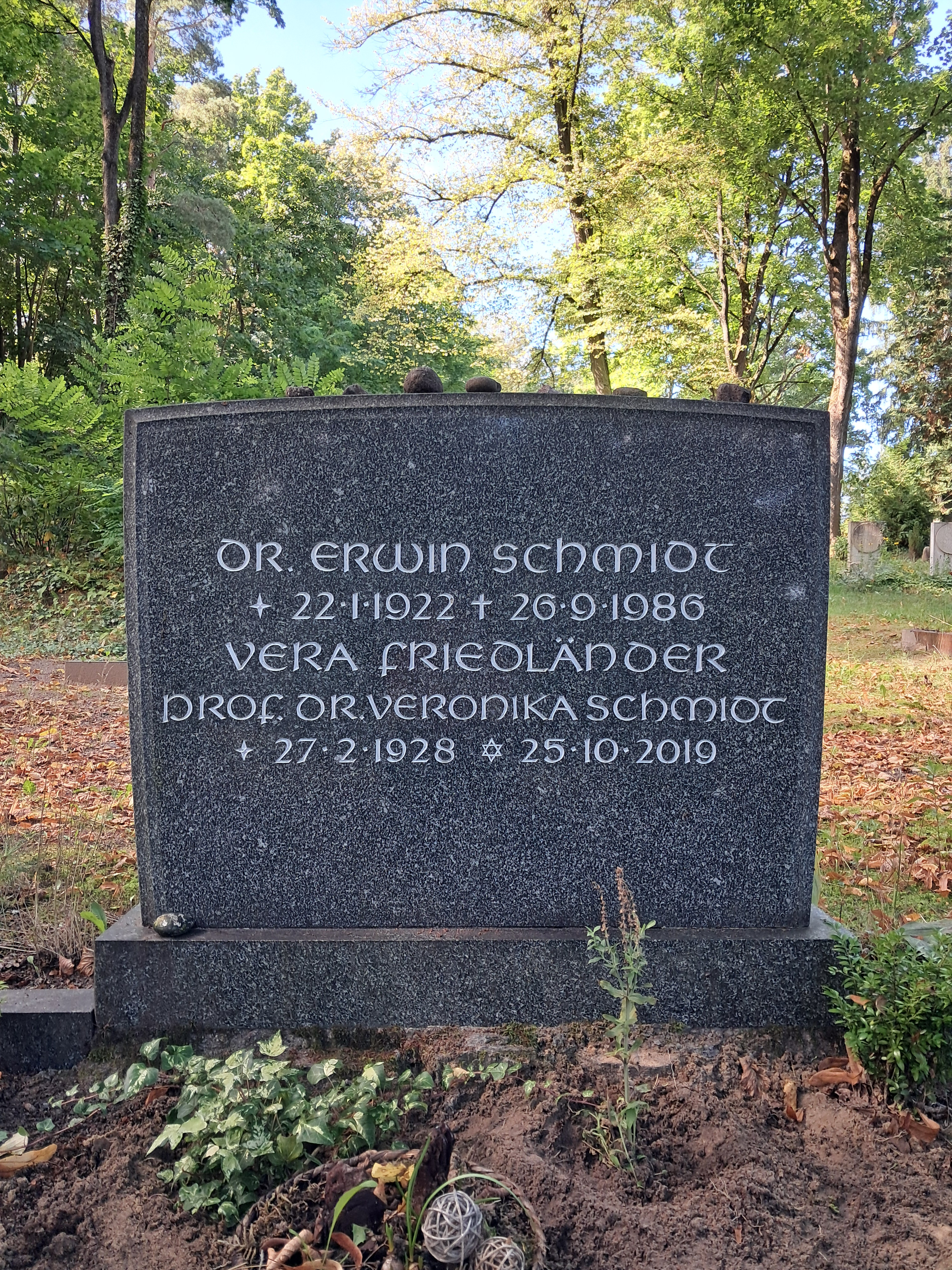
Grave of Vera Friedländer and her husband Erwin Schmidt at the cemetery of Woltersdorf

Friedländer died in Berlin in October 2019 at the age of 91.

In March 2020, a memorial plaque for the forced laborers of the Salamander company was attached to the shoe manufacturer's former repair shop in Berlin-Kreuzberg and inaugurated on 21 July 2020.

== Publications ==
- Die Streckformen des deutschen Verbums. Substantivisch-verbale Wortverbindungen in publizistischen Texten der Jahre 1948 bis 1967. (The light verb constructions of the German verb. Noun-verb word combinations in journalistic texts from 1948 to 1967.) Max Niemeyer Verlag, Halle (Saale) 1968.
- Sprechen Sie deutsch? Sprich mit uns. (Do you speak German? Talk to us.) Niemiecki w radiu, Wydawnictwa Radia i Telewizji, Warsaw 1976.
- Sprechen Sie deutsch? Zu Gast in der DDR. (Do you speak German? A guest in the GDR.) Niemiecki w radiu, Wydawnictwa Radia i Telewizji, Warsaw 1977.
- Sprechen Sie deutsch? Aus dem Alltag. (Do you speak German? From everyday life.) Niemiecki w radiu, Wydawnictwa Radia i Telewizji, Warsaw 1978.
- Gesellschaftlich determinierte Bedeutungsveränderungen im deutschen Wortschatz seit dem 19. Jahrhundert. (Socially determined changes of meaning in German vocabulary since the 19th century.) Linguistische Studien, Akademie der Wissenschaften der DDR, Zentralinstitut für Sprachwissenschaft, Berlin 1978. (Linguistic Studies, Academy of Sciences of the GDR, Central Institute for Linguistics, Berlin 1978.)
- Späte Notizen (Late notes). Verlag Neues Leben, Berlin 1982. New edition Man kann nicht eine halbe Jüdin sein (It's impossible to be half a Jew). Agimos-Verlag, Kiel 1993; Trafo-Verlag Berlin 2008, ISBN 9783896267863. Autobiographical novel.
- Deutsch in Episoden – Lehr- und Übungsbuch für Fortgeschrittene (German in episodes – Text and exercise book for advanced learners). Państwowe Wydawnictwo Naukowe, Warsaw 1985.
- Mein polnischer Nachbar (My Polish neighbour). Verlag Neues Leben, Berlin 1986.
- Fliederzeit (Lilac time). Verlag Neues Leben, Berlin 1987.
- Vier Männer von drüben und andere Erzählungen (Four men from over there and other stories). Edition Prott, Berlin 1996.
- Eine Mischehe oder der kleine Auftrag aus Jerusalem (A mixed marriage or the small order from Jerusalem). Verlag am Park, Berlin 1998.
- Kleine Geschichte der geografischen Entdeckungen (Little history of geographical discoveries, together with Erwin Schmidt). Trafo-Verlag, Berlin 2004.
- Die Kinder von La Hille (The children of La Hille). Aufbau Taschenbuch Verlag, Berlin 2004.
- Ein Lederbeutel. Geschichten (A leather pouch. Stories). Trafo-Verlag, Berlin 2008. ISBN 978-3-89626-660-6.
- Ich bin Vergangenheit und Gegenwart. Autobiografie (I am past and present. Autobiography). Trafo-Verlag, Berlin 2009. ISBN 978-3-89626-930-0.
- VERA – Späte Notizen (VERA – Late notes). Play, publisher: Gerd Bedszent), Trafo-Verlag, Berlin 2012. ISBN 978-3-86465-018-5.
- Zwei Frauen in Südfrankreich. 1940 bis 1944 (Two women in the south of France. 1940 to 1944). Verlag am Park, Berlin 2014. ISBN 978-3-89793-307-1.
- Reise in die Vergangenheit (Journey into the past). Verlag am Park, Berlin 2015. ISBN 978-3-945-18733-3.
- Ich war Zwangsarbeiterin bei Salamander (I was a forced laborer at Salamander). Das Neue Berlin, Berlin 2016. ISBN 978-3-360-01313-2.
- Alfred Wohlgemuth – Ein unbesungener Held (Alfred Wohlgemuth – An unsung hero). Verlag am Park, Berlin 2018. ISBN 978-3-947094-09-7.
- Randbemerkungen. Letzte Texte. (Marginal notes. Last texts.) Verlag am Park, Berlin 2020. ISBN 978-3-947094-64-6.
