= László Karakó =

Hungarian politician

Member of the National Assembly
- In office 14 May 2010 – 5 May 2014
- In office 15 May 2002 – 15 May 2006

Personal details
- Born: 27 March 1955 (age 71) Gáva (today part of Gávavencsellő), Hungary
- Party: Fidesz (since 2001)
- Other political affiliations: MSZMP (1984–1989)
- Children: László; Gergely
- Profession: politician

László Karakó (born 27 March 1955) is a Hungarian politician, member of the National Assembly (MP) for Tiszavasvári (Szabolcs-Szatmár-Bereg County Constituency III) between 2010 and 2014. He had served as Member of Parliament for Tiszavasvári from 2002 to 2006. Karakó was the chairman of the Council, then Mayor, of Gávavencsellő from 1988 to 2010.

== Biography ==
Karakó graduated from public administration organisation at the College of Public Administration in 1986. He acquired a law degree from the Faculty of Law of the University of Miskolc in 1996. He headed the local Council of Gávavencsellő between 1988 and 1990. From 1992 to 2000 he was the leader of the local soccer club. Since 1990 he has been the president of the firemen's association. Since 1998 he has presided over the Regional Development Association of the Upper Dada. From 1998 until 2000 he was the president and CEO of the Sóstó Development Corporation. In 2000 he was member of the Regional Development Council of the North-Plains, and since the same year he has been on the board of trustees of the Dr. József Zilahy Public Foundation. Since 1999 he has been a presbyter of the Protestant Congregation.

He was a member of the Hungarian Socialist Workers' Party (MSZMP) between 1984 until 1989. He ran in the parliamentary elections in the Spring of 1990. He was elected mayor of Gávavencsellő in the local elections in 1990, 1994, and 1998, in the latter case supported by Fidesz - Hungarian Civic Party (FIDESZ-MPP), the Independent Smallholders' Party (FKGP), the Hungarian Christian-Democratic Alliance (MKDSZ) and the Entrepreneurs' Party. He was elected into the County Assembly at all the three elections, on each occasion he was deputy chairman of the body of representatives. In 2001 he joined Fidesz, where he presided over the Gávavencsellő branch.

On 21 April 2002 he was elected MP for Tiszavasvári constituency (Szabolcs-Szatmár-Bereg County III). He had been active in the Committee on Human Rights, Minorities and Religion since May of the same year. In the 2002 local elections he was re-elected mayor, representative and vice president of the County Assembly for the fourth time. He was elected to the National Assembly in 2010. He is a member of the Committee on Employment and Labour. He was the chairman of the Subcommittee for investigating the government measures in the past 8 years (between 2002 and 2010). He lost his mayoral seat in the 2010 local elections.

== Personal life ==
He is married and has two sons, László and Gergely.
