= Judah Alkalai =

Bosnian rabbi (1798–1878)

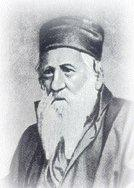
- Born: 1798; Sarajevo, Bosnia Eyalet, Ottoman Empire
- Died: September 1, 1878 (aged 80); Jerusalem, Mutasarrifate of Jerusalem, Ottoman Empire
- Resting place: Har HaZeitim
- Known for: Zionism

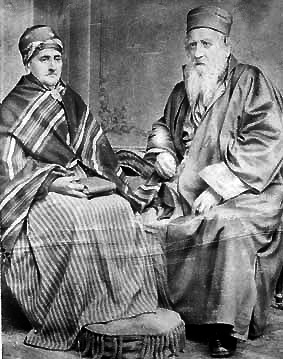
A portrait of the Rabbi Yehuda Alkalai and his wife Esther in 1874, before their immigration to Palestine

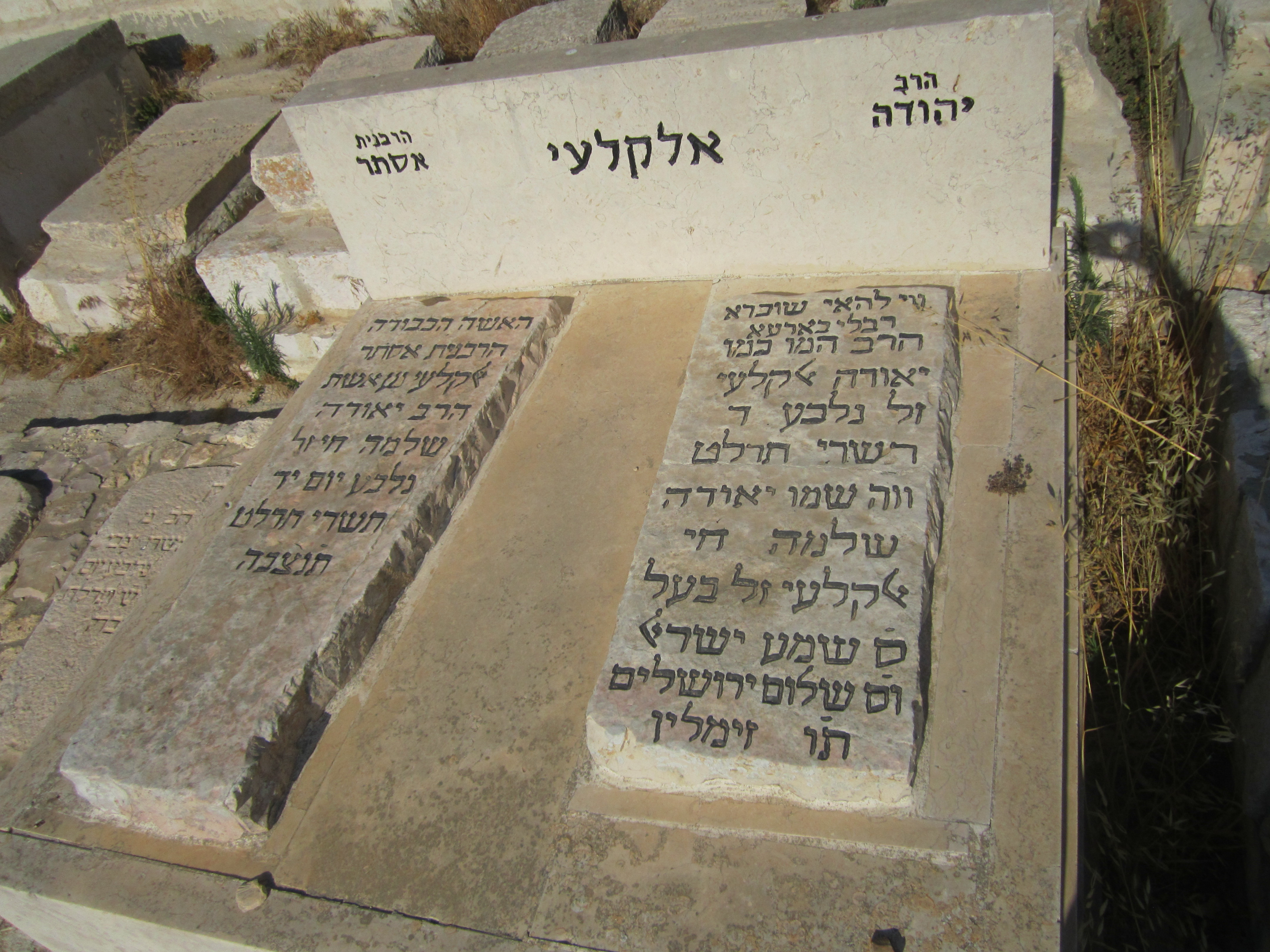
Yehuda Alakai's grave on the Mount of Olives

Judah ben Solomon Chai Alkalai (1798 – October 1878) was a Bosnian rabbi and one of the influential precursors of modern Zionism along with the Prussian Rabbi Zvi Hirsch Kalischer. Although he was a Sephardic Jew, he played an important role in a process widely attributed to Ashkenazi Jews. Alkalai became noted through his advocacy of a return of the Jews to the Land of Israel. By reason of some of his projects, he may be regarded as one of the precursors of modern Zionists such as Theodor Herzl.

== Biography ==
He was born into Sephardic family in Sarajevo in 1798. At that time Bosnia and Herzegovina was under Ottoman Empire.

He studied in Jerusalem, which also belonged to the Ottoman Turkish Empire, under different rabbis and came under the influence of the Kabbalah.

In 1825 he became reader and teacher at the Sephardic community of Semlin, and then its rabbi a few years later. Semlin, today's Zemun district of the Serbian capital Belgrade, was at that time part of the Austrian Empire's Military Frontier. At the time of Alkalai's arrival, the region was experiencing strong nationalist movements, and the Serbian War of Independence, which led to the creation of a new Serbian state after centuries of Ottoman occupation, gave impetus to new nationalistic ideas among Balkan Jews such as Alkalai.

In 1852, Alkalai established the Society of the Settlement of Eretz Yisrael in London.

In 1871 Alkalai visited Jerusalem and established another short-lived colonization society. In 1874, at the age of 76, he moved there with his wife. He died in 1878, days after his native Bosnia was occupied by the Austro-Hungarian Empire, and was buried in the ancient Mount of Olives Jewish Cemetery.

== Influence on Theodor Herzl ==
Theodor Herzl's paternal grandfather, Simon Loeb Herzl, reportedly attended Alkalai's synagogue in Semlin and the two frequently visited. Grandfather Simon Loeb Herzl "had his hands on" one of the first copies of Alkalai's 1857 work prescribing the "return of the Jews to the Holy Land and renewed glory of Jerusalem." Contemporary scholars conclude that Herzl's own implementation of modern Zionism was undoubtedly influenced by that relationship.

== Religious base for activism ==
Alkalai's view of Jewish return to the Land of Israel was a religious one. He maintained, based on an ample body of religious literature, that the coming of the Messiah and divine redemption of the Jews required their return to the Promised Land. His Kabbalistic view made him specifically assert that the year 1840 was the Year of Redemption, which was not a single year, but "a century, from this day until 1939", representing the "days of the Messiah". Unless powerful practical steps were taken, this opportunity would be lost, and the next extended "year" starting in 1940 would be one of great hardship when "with an outpouring of wrath will gather our dispersed". The outcome - the return to the Promised Land - would be the same, but under much harsher circumstances.

== Political proto-Zionism ==
Alkalai began by writing in Ladino, which limited his outreach to the rather small European Sephardic community. Only later did he adopt the much wider understood Hebrew language, and he only intensified his political work after the age of 60, at a time when a wider audience seemed to be ready to accept his ideas.

In his Shalom Yerushalayim (The Peace of Jerusalem), 1840, he replies to those who attacked his book, Darkhei No'am (The Pleasant Paths), which treated of the duty of tithes. Another work, Minchat Yehudah (The Offering of Judah), Vienna, 1843, is a panegyric on Montefiore and Crémieux, who had rescued the Jews of Damascus from a blood libel accusation. The 1840 Damascus Affair reassured Alkalai that the Jews needed a land of their own to act as a safe haven, but at the same time the positive effects of the intervention by the European powers and by a united front of European Jewish notables also convinced him about the usefulness of foreign support to the success of such an enterprise. In Raglei mevasser he specifically wrote that "The salvation of Israel lies in addressing to the kings of the earth a general request for the welfare of our nation and our holy cities, and for our return in repentance to the house of our mother... our salvation will come rapidly from the kings of the earth."

His plan called for the creation of a representative "Assembly of Jewish Notables" who would advocate the case of a Jewish return to the Land of Israel, and for the settlement of the land using funds collected from Jewish communities in form of a tithe, a tenth of one's income, a practice called halukka and already used for supporting the religious groups inhabiting the Jewish Four Holy Cities. In Minchat Yehudah Alkalai proposes a return to the roots: the restoration of Hebrew as the Jewish national language, the recovery of land of Israel by purchasing it much like Abraham did with the cave and field of Machpelah in Hebron, and agriculture as the basis for renewed Jewish settlement. For practical reasons and in spite of being a traditionalist who opposed Reform Judaism, Alkalai attempted to achieve national unity. Eventually Zionism would apply several of Alkalai's principles, such as the revival of Hebrew, the purchase of land, the pursuit of agricultural labour (though motivated by a "return to the land" of the Jews, seen as alienated from manual work, nature, and their ancestral land, rather than just as a means of immigrant integration and sustenance), and a political effort towards receiving support from the world powers, and for uniting all Jews behind Zionist ideals.

Apart from creating an impressive literary output, Alkalai also toured Western Europe in 1851–1852, including Great Britain, and spread his message among local communities. The success was small among fellow Jews, not least due to other rabbis who considered his idea of human acts constituting a catalyst for the coming of the Messiah as heretical, but British Christian Zionists helped him found a short-lived colonisation society.

His work, Goral la-Adonai (A Lot for the Lord), published in Vienna in 1857, is a treatise on the restoration of the Jews to their ancestral homeland, and suggests methods for the betterment of conditions in the Land of Israel. After a somewhat able homiletical discussion of the Messianic problem, in which he shows considerable knowledge of the traditional writers, Alkalai suggests the formation of a joint-stock company, such as a steamship or railroad trust, whose endeavor it should be to induce the Ottoman sultan to cede Land of Israel to the Jews as a tributary country, on a plan similar to that on which the Danubian Principalities were governed. To this suggestion are appended the commendations of numerous Jewish scholars of various schools of thought. The problem of the restoration of Palestine to the Jews was also discussed by Alkalai in Shema' Yisrael (Hear, O Israel), 1861 or 1862, and in Harbinger of Good Tidings (compare Jewish Chronicle, 1857, p. 1198, where his name is spelled Alkali).

Alkalai joined the first Jewish organisation for the agricultural settlement of the Land of Israel, the Kolonisations-Verein für Palästina (Association for the Colonisation of Palestine), established in Frankfurt (Oder) in 1860 by Chaim Lorje. Although Alkalai and others, such as Rabbi Zvi Hirsch Kalischer, put much energy into promoting its goals, the association couldn't reach any tangible results and soon dispersed.

== See also ==
- Yehuda Bibas
- Arthur Hertzberg
- Proto-Zionism
