= Carl Friedländer =

German pathologist and microbiologist

Carl Friedländer (19 November 1847, Brieg (Brzeg), Silesia – 13 May 1887, Meran (Merano), County of Tyrol) was a German pathologist and microbiologist who helped discover the bacterial cause of pneumonia in 1882. He also first described thromboangiitis obliterans.

Edwin Klebs had seen bacteria in the airways of individuals who died from pneumonia in 1875; however, it was not until 1882 when Friedländer recognized that bacteria (Klebsiella pneumoniae) were nearly always observable in persons dying from pneumonia that the bold statement was made that these were the likely cause of pneumonia. Friedländer's second communication on the micrococci of pneumonia, which appeared on 15 November 1883, touched off a controversy over the causative agent of pneumonia that continued for the next three years. In this second report he noted that he had examined more than 50 additional cases of pneumonia and that he had identified bacteria in nearly all of them and that sections from which the bacteria were absent were from the lungs of patients dying late in the course of the disease. Friedländer also noted that it was necessary to use special stains (e.g. the Gram Stain) to see the bacteria because using ordinary stains (H&E) nuclei and fibrin stained the same way as bacteria and thus obscured the ability to see the bacteria. As a result, Klebsiella pneumoniae is often called Friedländer's bacterium or Friedländer's bacillus. It is unclear if the bacteria that he observed in persons dying of pneumonia were truly all Klebsiella, some may well have been Streptococcus pneumoniae.

In 1886, he introduced the ampoule in medicine.

He died a premature death, aged 39 or 40, after a brief stint with a respiratory disease, believed to be caused by his discovered infectious organism, the Friedlander's Bacillus.

== Works ==
- Friedländer, C. Über die Schizomyceten bei der acuten fibrösen Pneumonie. Virchow's Arch pathol. Anat. u. Physiol., 87 (2):319-324, Feb. 4, 1882.
- Carl Friedländer: Arteriitis obliterans. Zentralblatt für die medizinischen Wissenschaften, Berlin, 1876, 14.
