= Alexander Moshe Lapidos =

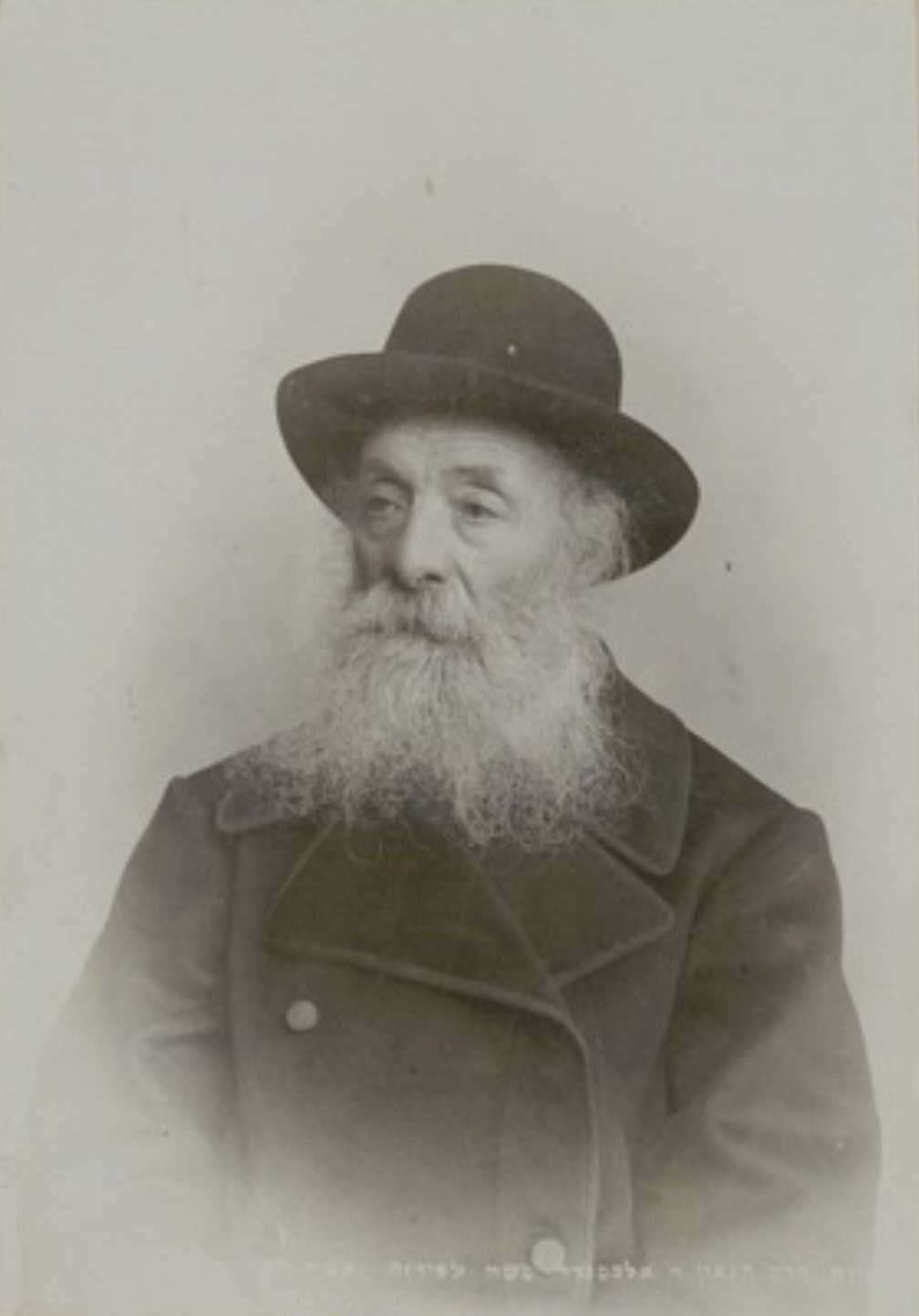

Alexander Moshe Lapidos (also known as Alexander Moses Lapidot, 1815–1906) was a Lithuanian Rabbi. He is known for his authorship of Divrei Emes, a Mussar sefer, published posthumously (Vilna, 1910).

== Biography ==
His father, Rabbi Tzvi Lapidos, was a wealthy scholar who arranged that the 13-year-old Alexander Moshe, whose in-person high-level interactions with many of the famous rabbis of that era were well known, should marry the only daughter of one of the wealthiest men in Jonava, a suburb of Kovna, Shimon Shushitzky. Over time Yenta and Alexander Moshe Lapidos had three daughters.

After the death of Rabbi Lapidos' first wife, he married a second time. With this wife, Gruna, he had a son and 3 more daughters.

The obituary describing her death at age 36 mentioned both the poverty under which they had lived and her unusual involvement in dealing with local Maskilim.

Thirty-six years before his death, Rabbi Lapidus married again. His third wife, Mina, was from Mir; her father was Rav Chaim Yehudah Leib Tiktinsky, rav of Mir.

== Training ==
A year after marrying Rebbetzin Yenta, Rabbi Lapidos traveled to Salant where his main teacher was Rabbi Zvi Hirsch Braude. He also became a life-long student-colleague of the decade-older Rabbi Yisroel Salanter.

== Rabbinical career ==
At age 17 he left Salant to become the rabbi of Jonava, his father-in-law's hometown, staying there over 30 years. His next and final position was as the rabbi and Av Bais Din for the city of Rassein. His monument mentions a career span of 70 years.

=== Writings ===
Although he corresponded with many rabbis and gave written rulings on their questions, most of what has survived of his writings are in the form of short articles in religious journals of the day and books written by others. Despite indication that he had many manuscripts in semi-final form, most of it was lost. Mainly it is his Divrei Emes, which has survived and been reprinted.

Lacking funds for his thoughts of founding a newspaper to serve as a counterweight to one being published by local Maskilim, he partnered with an existing newspaper.

Rabbi Lapidus wrote supportingly about Hovevei Zion in Shivath Zion (volume 1 p. 35).
