= Michael Friedlander =

Michael Friedlander may refer to:

- Michael Friedländer (1833–1910), Orientalist and principal of Jews' College, London
- Sir Michael Friedlander (businessman) (born 1936), New Zealand businessman and philanthropist knighted in 2016
- Michael W. Friedlander (1928–2021), American physicist and skeptic
