= Albert Friedländer =

Albert Friedländer (19 June 1888 – 14 May 1966) was a German-born Swiss bank director and writer.

Albert Friedländer was born in Berlin, where he owned the prestigious private bank "Bankhaus Friedländer Berlin". He also served as chairman of the Berlin stock exchange association (Deutscher Börsenverein) in Berlin. In 1920, he married Luise Charlotte Henriette Emma Peters. They later divorced.

Facing hardship as a Jew, Friedländer immigrated to France in 1934. After the occupation of much of the country by German troops, he was imprisoned in 1940 but managed to escape to Switzerland in 1942, where he acquired citizenship and settled in Zürich to become a writer. He lived there until his death in 1966.

== Additional sources ==
- Anonymous: Biographisches Handbuch der deutschsprachigen Emigration nach 1933. Vol. 1, p. 197, Munich 1980 [in German].
- Sternfeld, W., & Tiedemann, E.: Deutsche Exilliteratur 1933-1945, eine Bio-Bibliographie. Darmstadt, 1962 (p. 95).
