= French ship Friedland =

Four ships of the French Navy have borne the name Friedland, in honour of the Battle of Friedland

- Friedland (1807), a 16-gun brig, captured in 1808 and taken into the Royal Navy as HMS Delight; she was sold in 1814.
- Friedland (1810), a Bucentaure-class 80-gun ship of the line.
- Friedland (1840), a 120-gun ship of the line fitted with a steam engine.
- Friedland (1877), an ironclad ("frégate cuirassée", lit. "armoured frigate") .
