= Rebecca Friedländer =

German novelist and short-story writer

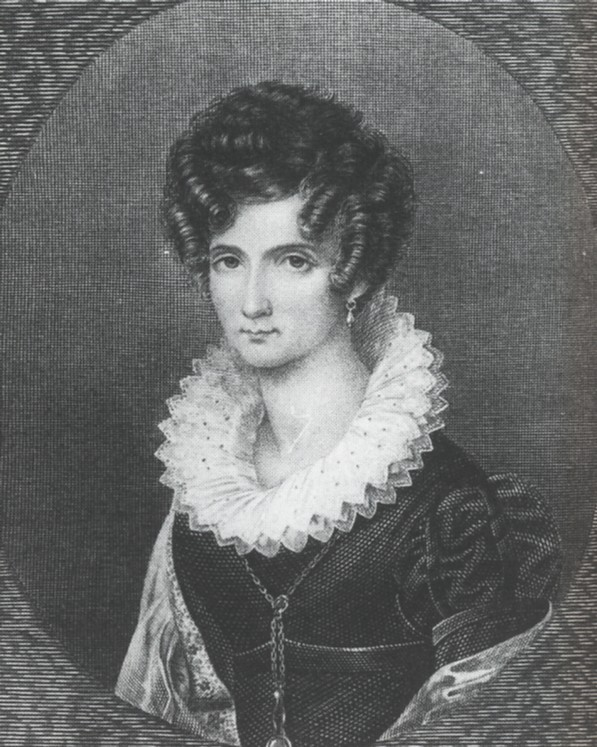
Rebecca Friedländer

Rebecca Friedländer (4 October 1783 – 30 August 1850) was a German novelist and short-story writer, composed “romantic novels” under the pen name of Regina Frohberg. She was also a close friend of Rahel Varnhagen, a renowned German writer.

== Biography ==
Rebecca Friedländer was born as Rebecca Solomon in Berlin, Germany on 4 October 1783 into a Jewish family of Jacob B. Solomon and Cheile Eger. Her father, who was a jewel merchant for the court, changed the family name from Solomon to Saaling.

In 1801, at the age of eighteen, she married Moses Friedländer, a banker, who was the son of David Friedländer, a prominent leader of the Berlin Jewish community. But she got a divorce in 1805. She converted to Christianity, and changed her name to Regina Frohberg. She never remarried.

Her first novel was published in 1808. In the beginning the literary style of her novels focused on "the romantic life about salon society". In 1813 she moved to Vienna, and resided until her death.

She died in Ischl, Vienna on 30 August 1850.
