= Max Friedlaender (lawyer) =

German lawyer (1873–1956)

Max O. Friedlaender (28 June 1873 in Bromberg – 28 May 1956 in Twickenham) was a German lawyer.

After passing the legal exam in 1898 in Munich, Friedlaender was admitted to the bar the following year.

Friedlaender is known for his leading commentary on the German Bar Code (Rechtsanwaltsordnung), which was later expanded to include a lawyers' code of honour, the predecessors of modern formulations of professional responsibilities and duties.

Due to his Jewish heritage, his bar license was withdrawn under the Nazi regime and Friedlaender fled to England in 1938. After World War II, he became an honorary member of the German Bar Association (Deutscher Anwaltverein).
