= Adolf Albrecht Friedländer =

Austrian neurologist and psychiatrist

Adolf Albrecht Friedländer (8 August 1870 – 19 January 1949) was an Austrian neurologist and psychiatrist.

He studied medicine at the University of Vienna, and completed further training in psychiatry. Beginning in 1897, he was assistant doctor to Otto Binswanger at the psychiatric-neurological clinic in Jena, and from 1900 in Frankfurt to Professor Emil Sioli. He was naturalized in Prussia and received his license to practice medicine in Bonn in 1903.

Friedländer wrote his doctoral thesis from 1902 to 1904 during the construction of a private psychiatric clinic, which was opened on March 1, 1904, named Privatklinik Hohe Mark im Taunus and located in Oberursel. He was appointed Hofrat in 1904 and received the Prussian professor title in 1910.

During the World War I, he served as a medical officer, was head of the Oberursel reserve hospital, and made a name for himself in the fight against epidemics in Warsaw. He later acted as consultant neurologist to two army corps on the Western Front. After the war, Friedländer sold his private clinic to the city of Frankfurt am Main in 1918 and settled in Frankfurt as a neurologist. In 1937, Friedländer emigrated to Bad Aussee in Austria because of his Jewish origins and founded a private practice, which he had to give up in 1938, also because of his Jewish descent.

Friedländer died on January 19, 1949, at his last place of residence, Bad Aussee.
