= Zvi Hirsh Broide =

Lithuanian Orthodox rabbis

Zvi Hirsh Broide (Hebrew: צבי הירש ברוידא, also spelled Tzvi Hirsch Braude) was a leading Talmudic scholar who served as Rav of the town of Salant. He was the first rebbi of Rabbi Yisrael Salanter.

== Life ==
His brother's name was Nachum Broide. Their father's name was Rabbi Arie Leib Broide, rabbi of Lvov and their mother was Chana, daughter of Rabbi Tzvi Hirsch Orenstein.

== Namesake ==
He had a namesake, the son in law of the Rabbi Simcha Zissel Ziv, the Alter of Kelm, who was later the Rosh Yeshiva of the Kelm Yeshiva and the teacher of Rabbi Eliyahu Eliezer Dessler.

== Famous students ==
- Rabbi Yisrael Salanter
- Rabbi Alexander Moshe Lapidos
