= Friedrich Ritter von Friedländer-Malheim =

Bohemian-Austrian painter

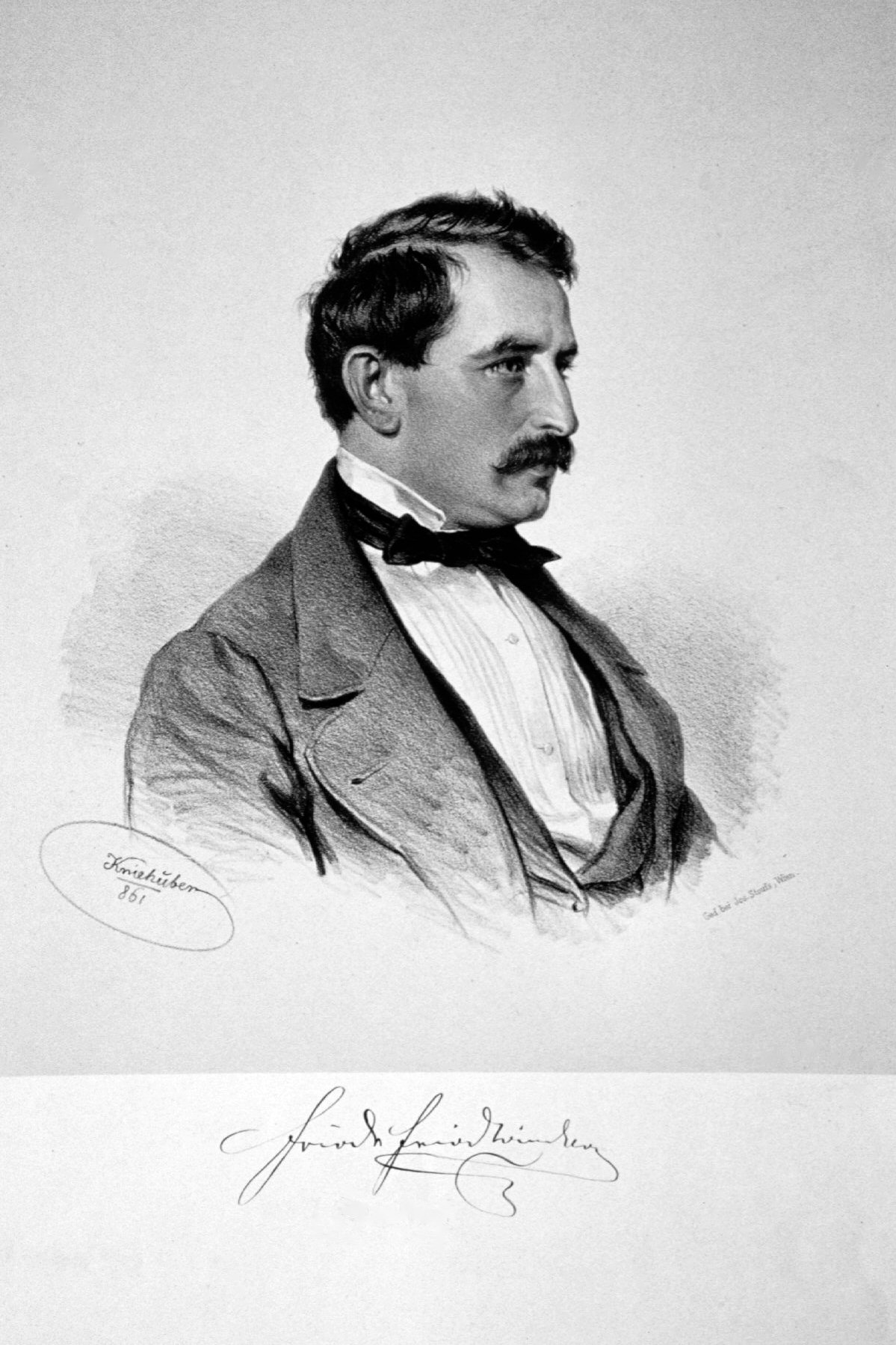
Friedrich Friedlander. Lithograph by Josef Kriehuber (1861)

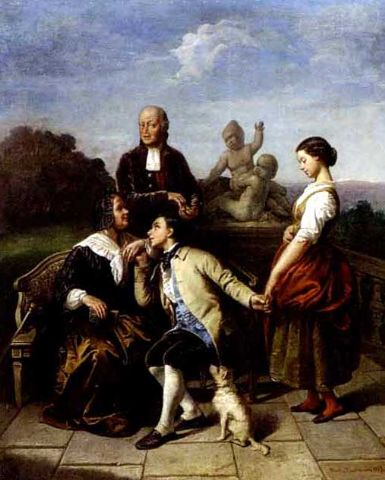
Brautschau im Park by Friedländer-Malheim (1857)

Friedrich Friedländer, later Friedrich Ritter von Friedländer-Malheim (Mahlheim) (January 10, 1825 – June 13, 1901), was a Bohemian-Austrian painter.

Friedländer was born in Kohljanowitz/Uhlířské Janovice, Bohemia. He studied at the Vienna Academy, and later under Ferdinand Georg Waldmüller, and visited Italy in 1850, Düsseldorf in 1852, and finally Paris. He is associated with the Düsseldorf school of painting.

He devoted himself at first to historical pictures, creating a genuine sensation with his painting entitled "The Death of Tasso". After 1854 he painted genre pictures exclusively, taking his subjects chiefly from military life and the local life of Vienna. His scenes from Swabian folk-life are well known. He died in Vienna.

== Works ==
The following are a few of Friedländer's paintings:

- People Pouring out of a Public Building into the Street, 1859 (Imperial Gallery, Vienna);
- The Politician in the Workshop, 1863;
- The Incendiary Caught in the Act, 1864;
- The Evening Hour, 1865;
- The Pawnbroker's Shop, 1866 (now in the possession of the Duke of Coburg);
- The Wine-Test, 1866;
- The New Comrade, 1868;
- The Invalids, 1871;
- The Declaration of Love, 1872;
- The Strawberry-Venders, 1872 (Imperial Gallery, Vienna);
- A good drink, 1873
- In cosy conversation

Since 1866 he had been a member of the Vienna Academy; in 1865 he received the Order of Francis Joseph and the Bavarian Order of Michael, and in 1867 the gold medal with crown for merit. He had recently been elevated to the nobility with the suggestive title of "Von Mahlheim". Many of his paintings are in the Imperial Gallery at Vienna. He taught his daughter Camilla Friedländer, who became a still life painter.
