= Paul Friedlander =

Paul Friedlander or Paul Friedländer may refer to:

- Paul Friedländer (chemist) (1857–1923), German chemist
- Paul Friedländer (philologist) (1882–1968), German philologist
- Paul Friedländer (journalist) (1891–1942), Austrian journalist and communist, and husband of Ruth Fischer
- Paul Friedlander (artist) (born 1951), English artist
- Paul Friedlander (golfer) (born c. 1970), Swazi golfer
