= Erwin Friedlander =

American nuclear physicist

Erwin M. Friedlander
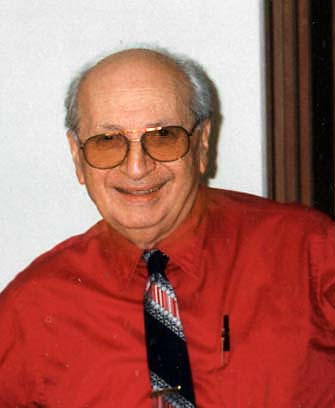
- Born: May 29, 1925; Cluj, Romania
- Died: January 22, 2004 (aged 78)
- Citizenship: United States
- Known for: Seminal contributions to particle physics
- Awards: Member of the Romanian Academy of Sciences, Humboldt Prize
- Scientific career
- Fields: Physics (theoretical)
- Institutions: Lawrence Berkeley National Laboratory, Fermilab, University of Pennsylvania, University of Marburg, Institute of Atomic Physics, Bucharest, Romania

Erwin Max Friedlander (May 29, 1925 – January 22, 2004) was a noted American expert in high-energy nuclear physics at Lawrence Berkeley National Laboratory and a member of the Romanian Academy of Sciences.

== Biography ==
A pioneer in the use of nuclear emulsions for cosmic ray and accelerator research, Friedlander founded and headed the Cosmic Rays Laboratory at the Institute for Atomic Physics in Bucharest, Romania, before emigrating to the United States in 1975.

He authored more than 250 scientific publications, was a professor at Cornell University, the University of Pennsylvania, and the University of Marburg in Germany, and conducted research at CERN, Fermilab, the Joint Institute for Nuclear Research in Russia, and at Lawrence Berkeley National Laboratory in Berkeley, California. He was the recipient of a Humboldt Prize in 1986.

Friedlander's research focused on multiparticle production dynamics. His Cosmic Ray Laboratory in Romania was among the first to discover multiplicity scaling laws in proton-nucleus reactions. During his years at the Lawrence Berkeley National Laboratory, Friedlander was engaged in the experimental study of the interactions of relativistic heavy ion nuclei and their secondary products. He played a leading role in many international collaborations, including the initiation of a collaboration using relativistic heavy ion beams at the Bevatron.

Friedlander was the youngest person ever elected to the Romanian Academy, an honor withdrawn by the country's Communist regime after he defected to the West in 1975. In 2003 the Romanian Academy of Sciences awarded him an honorary membership in recognition of his lifelong contributions to physics.

In 1978 Friedlander became actively involved in the worldwide human rights movement known as SOS — Scientists for Sakharov, Orlov and Sharansky. Friedlander was also an accomplished pianist and organist and was fluent in seven languages.

He died on January 22, 2004, in Oakland, California, after a long struggle with heart disease.

== Publications ==
- Friedlander, E.M. "Biases in Signals for Intermittency Detected in High Energy Collisions", Modern Physics Letters, May 19, 1989
- Friedlander, E.M. "Evidence from Very Large Transverse Momenta of a Change with Temperature of Velocity of Sound in Hadronic Matter", Physical Review Letters, July 2, 1979
- Friedlander, E.M. "How fast does the multiplicity of particle production in p-p collisions really increase with primary energy?" Lawrence Berkeley National Laboratory, Department of Energy Scientific and Technical Information
- Friedlander, E.M. with Heckman, Harry H. "Relativistic Heavy Ion Collisions: Experiment" (PDF), Lawrence Berkeley National Laboratory, Department of Energy Scientific and Technical Information
- Friedlander, E.M. "Small, large, and very large transverse momenta in a unified hydrodynamical description, Open Library
- Friedlander, E.M., Cincheza, Iuliana M., Haseganu, Dumitru Gh., "Identification of heavy ions in AgCl monocrystals by means of multiple coulomb scattering", Nuclear Instruments and Methods, June 1974 Lawrence Berkeley National Laboratory
