= Leslie Friedlander =

Jewish cantor

Leslie Friedlander was the first female cantor ordained by the Academy for Jewish Religion in New York, which occurred in 1993. She served eight years as Cantor of Temple Emanuel in New Hyde Park and eleven years as Cantor of Riverdale Temple in the Bronx, and currently serves at Temple Isaiah in Great Neck, New York, which she joined in 2011. In 2006 she received a Commendation from the City of New York, Office of the Comptroller. In 2007 she received a Citation of Merit from the Bronx Borough President in recognition of her service and her contributions to Jewish children in the Bronx and her contributions as a leader in her role as a Jewish educator. In 2009 she received a Proclamation for special recognition of service to the community from the assembly of the State of New York and the New York City Council.
