= Julius Friedländer =

Julius Friedländer may refer to:

- Julius Friedländer (numismatist) (1813–1884), German numismatist
- Julius Friedländer (painter) (1810–1861), Danish painter
- Julius Reinhold Friedlander (1803–1839), American writer
