= Camilla Friedländer =

Austrian painter (1856–1928)

- Born: 10 December 1856; Vienna, Austrian Empire
- Died: 3 October 1928 (aged 71); Vienna, Austria
- Known for: Painting

Camilla Friedlander later Camilla Edle von Malheim Friedländer (1856−1928) was an Austrian painter. She was known for her still lifes.

== Biography ==
Friedlander was born in Vienna on 10 December 1856. She was taught by her father Friedrich Friedländer.

The Emperor of Austria bought her painting "Orientalische Gegenstände", which had been exhibited at the Vienna Künstlerhaus.

Friedlander exhibited her work at the Palace of Fine Arts at the 1893 World's Columbian Exposition in Chicago, Illinois.

In 1901 Friedlander became a nun, entering the Salesian Monastery (Salesianerinnenkirche (Wien)).

She died in Vienna on 3 October 1928.

== Gallery ==
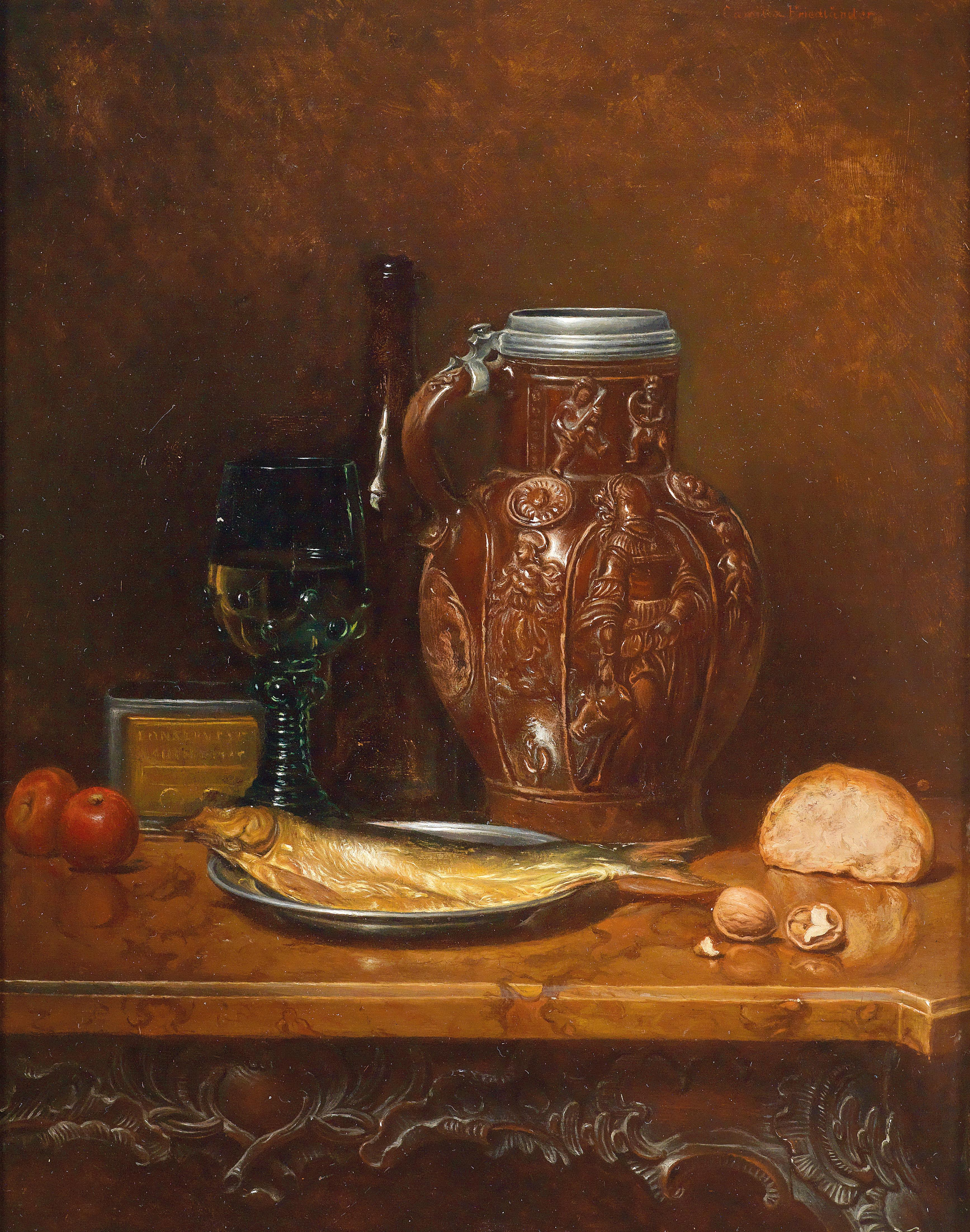
Camilla Friedländer Stillleben mit Tonkrug

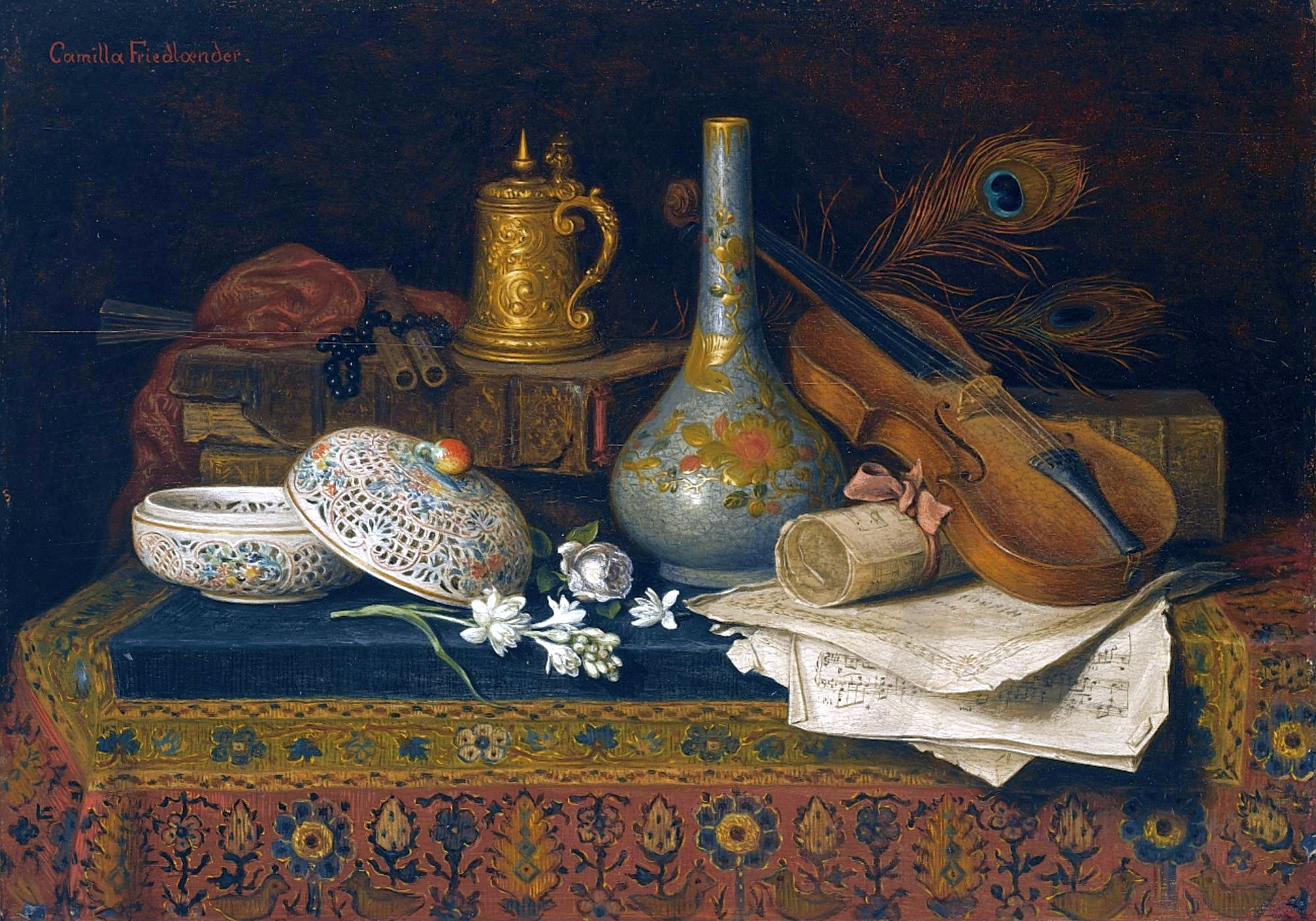
Still life
