= Benedetto Musolino =

Italian politician (1809–1885)

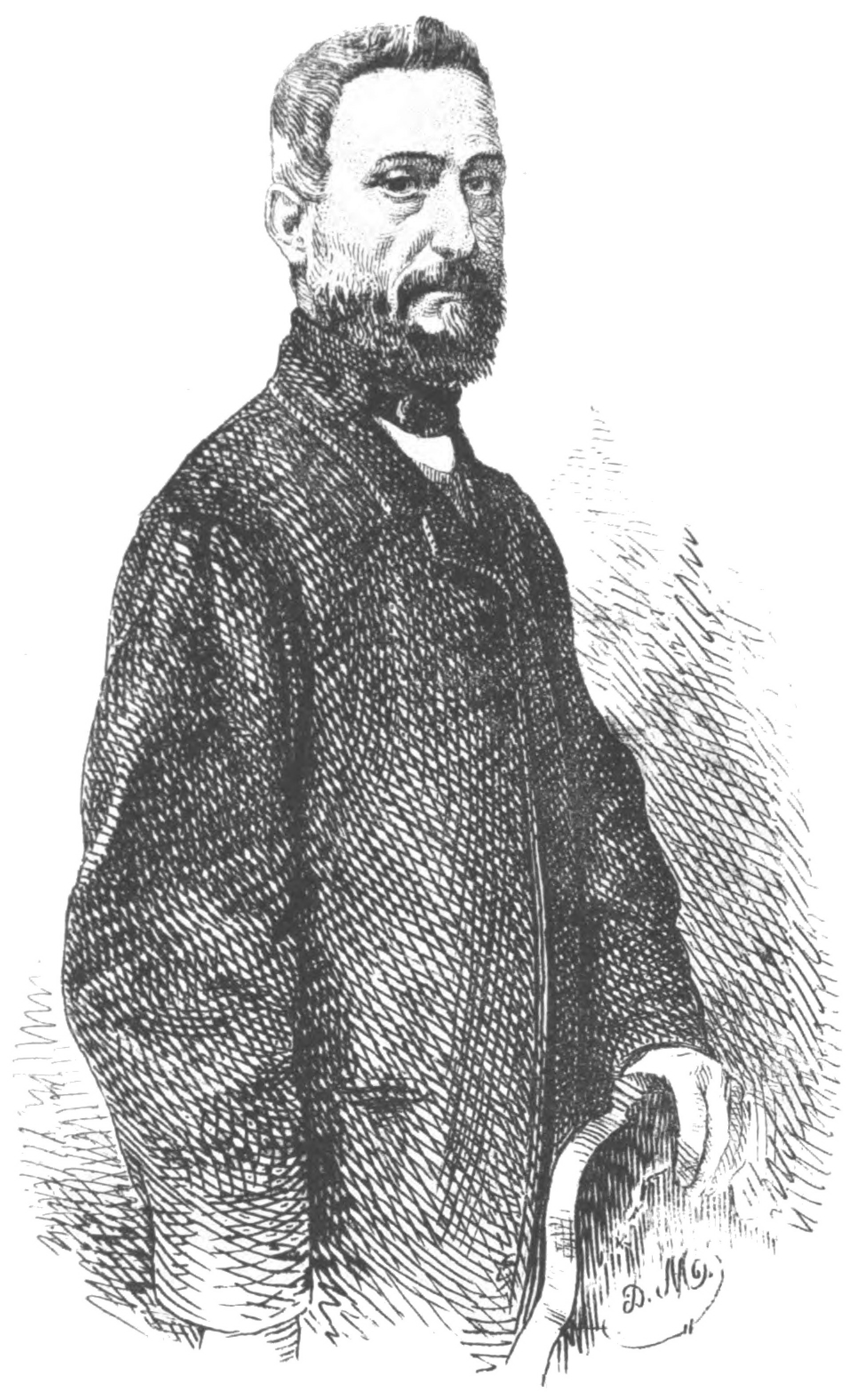
Benedetto Musolino.

Benedetto Musolino (8 February 1809 – 15 November 1885) was an Italian soldier and politician, who was a member of the Chamber of Deputies of the Kingdom of Italy from 1861 to 1876 and later a member of the Senate of the Kingdom of Italy. Musolino was associated with the Historical Left in Italian politics. A native of Calabria, Musolino was a radical republican and atheist engaged in militant activity against the Kingdom of the Two Sicilies during the Italian unification. In the aftermath of the Revolutions of 1848, he was involved with Giuseppe Mazzini's Roman Republic. Later, he took part in the Expedition of the Thousand under the command of Giuseppe Garibaldi, as the Kingdom of Italy was created through the conquest of the Two Sicilies by the Kingdom of Sardinia.

== Biography ==
=== Early life ===
Benedetto Musolino was born to Domenico Musolino and Francesca Starace, he grew up and was educated in a family of republican ideas, in which his father and uncle had been forced into exile for having participated in the Parthenopean Republic, the semi-autonomous regime set up under the auspicies of the French First Republic during the French Revolutionary Wars. When Musolino was just six years of age, at the castle in his hometown of Pizzo, Calabria, the Napoleonic King of Naples, Joachim Murat was executed by firing squad at the hands of the Bourbon monarchists.

After school, he moved to Naples where he continued his studies in law, also showing an inclination for philosophy. In Naples he was able to establish relations with Luigi Settembrini and with a group of like-minded radical intellectuals, and for his ideas he suffered a short period of imprisonment. Driven by his passionate and romantic character, he then left for Palestine and also visited the eastern islands of the Mediterranean Sea, before making his home in Constantinople (then under the Ottoman Empire), admitted to the court of the Vizier of which he was a councilor.

=== Militancy in the Two Sicilies ===
In 1832, on his return to the Kingdom of the Two Sicilies, driven by radical education and passionate outbursts, he dedicated himself to the organization of an anti-Bourbon underground militant group called "I Figliuoli della Giovine Italia" (The Sons of Young Italy); despite the name that recalls Giuseppe Mazzini's Young Italy and the common progressive and anti-monarchist intent, the two figures differed in spirit (Mazzini's religiosity as opposed to Musolino's militant atheism) and in the organization: "I Figliuoli della Giovine Italia" were in fact configured as a clandestine society with symbols and rituals typical of quasi-Masonic secret societies such as the Carbonari.

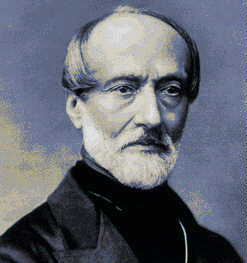
Painting of Mazzini

In 1839, denounced to the Bourbon authorities by informers, Musolino was captured together with a group of republicans: his brother Pasquale, Settembrini, Raffaele Anastasio and Saverio Bianchi. After serving more than three years of detention and then confined to Pizzo, together with his nephew Giovanni Nicotera, Felice Sacchi and Eugenio De Riso, he clandestinely exercised a secret political activity in the country to lay the foundations for revolutionary uprisings, and in 1848 - the year in which Ferdinand II of the Two Sicilies was forced to promulgate the Constitution on the basis of the riots in Palermo - he was elected deputy in the Neapolitan Parliament in the district of Monteleone. When the Chamber was dissolved of authority, Musolino and other Calabrian parliamentarians, following Giuseppe Ricciardi - and after Cosenza had become the seat of the provisional government - organized an armed resistance connected with the uprisings of Cilento and Sicily. The royal forces, however, had the upper hand and put down the insurrection: they devastated the town of Pizzo, shot a brother of Musolino and set fire to the family home; the father was killed and shortly afterwards the mother, the other brother and the sister-in-law died in distress in the years followed.

=== Expedition of the Thousand ===
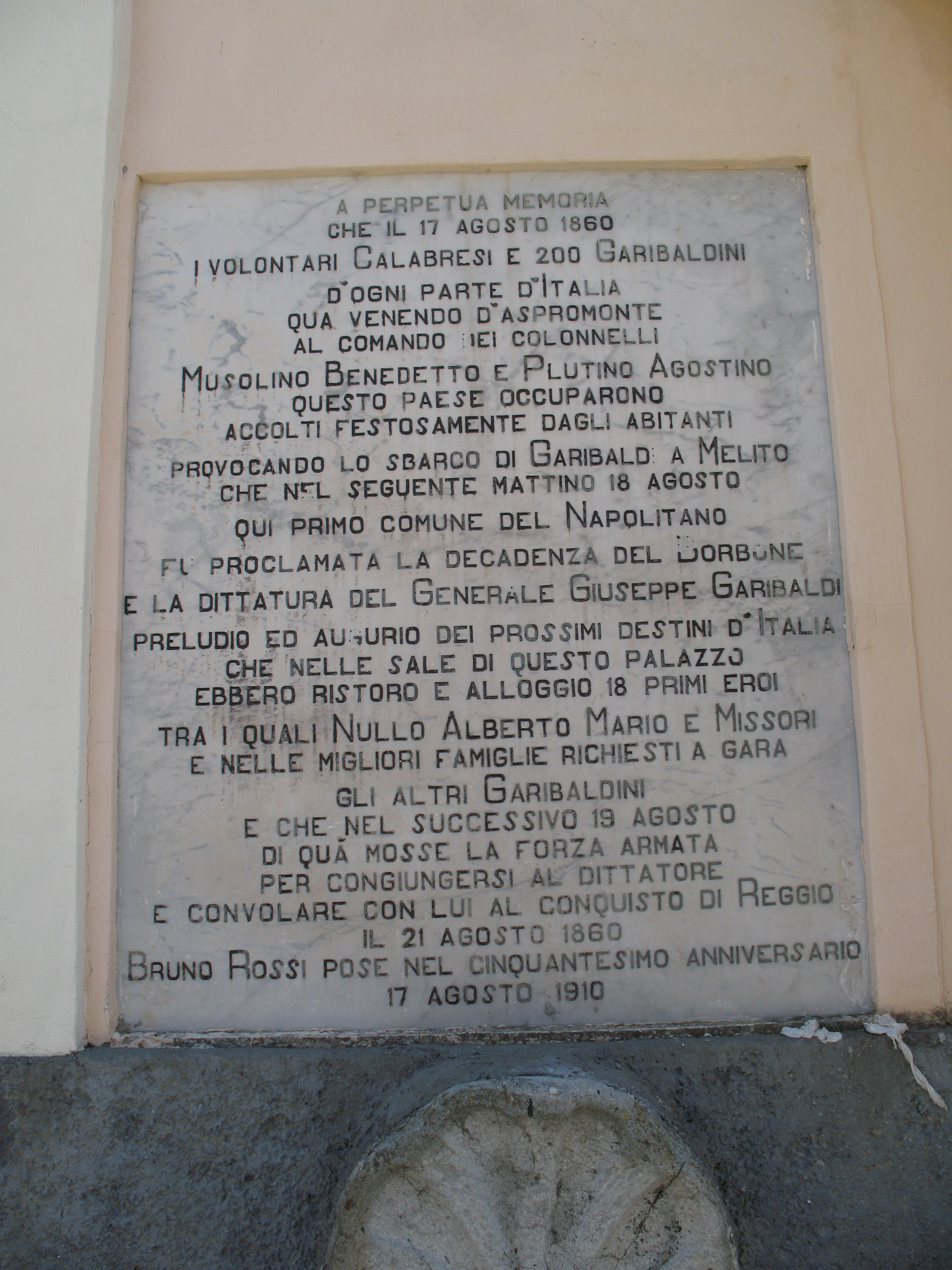
A plaque in San Lorenzo denoting Musolino's involvement in the Expedition of the Thousand.

Together with his nephew Giovanni Nicotera, Musolino took refuge first in Corfu (then controlled by the British) and then in Mazzini-controlled Rome. Here he participated in the uprisings of the Roman Republic under Mazzini but after his fall he was forced to flee, this time to France, pursued by the death sentence that had been inflicted on him in absentia by the Bourbon courts. In France he lived through years of hardship, not giving up on the one hand to militancy in the ranks of radical democracy and on the other to rethinking revolutionary experiences. The divergence with Mazzini's strategies came to maturity, which Musolino considered inadequate to the circumstances, a judgment confirmed by the failure of the Sapri Expedition shipwrecked in 1857. He developed a socialistic political idea; the fight against inequality, wealth redistribution and overthrowing of the old monarchial order.

Later he actively participated in the Expedition of the Thousand, joining the army of Giuseppe Garibaldi in Sicily. With a squad of selected soldiers he tried to conquer the fort of Reggio Calabria, but the failure of the operation led him to take refuge on the Silan plateau; he actively and successfully continued to promote the insurrectional activity in Calabria, giving his name to a company of volunteers organized by him. The crowning glory of his activism was his appointment, in 1861, as member of the first Italian Parliament, a position he held for almost twenty years (later he passed to the Senate), placing himself among the ranks of the Historical Left headed by Agostino Depretis and Francesco Crispi, and not failing to make a constructive contribution in favor of the poorest sections of the Italian population, even if the sector in which he was most committed was that of foreign policy.

He was initiated into Freemasonry between 1862 and 1865 in the "Dante Alighieri" Lodge in Turin and at the Masonic Constituent Assembly in Genoa on 29 May 1865 he represented the "Speranza Prima" Lodge in Montevideo.

=== Proto-Zionism ===
Having visited Palestine four times during his lifetime, Musolino followed the situation of the Jews of the Old Yishuv and in 1851 authored Gerusalemme ed il Popolo Ebreo, a work of proto-Zionism and romantic nationalism in which he suggests that the British should set up a Jewish principality under the auspicies Ottoman Empire. The proposed religion of this state would be Rabbinic Judaism and Hebrew the official language. Only those who could speak and write Hebrew would be permitted to vote. At the time that Musolino authored this, Viscount Palmerston, the British statesman who was considering such a proposal (influenced by the Evangelical Zionism of the Earl of Shaftesbury as part of his Society for the Relief of Persecuted Jews) was a sponsor and ally of the Italian revolutionaries against Austria and the Bourbons.

Pizzo, his hometown, welcomed him back in 1883, when tired and sick he sought refuge in his native town where he died after two years.

== Bibliography ==
- 1948 - Al popolo delle Due Sicilie, Napoli
- 1948 - L'Inghilterra e l'Italia, Roma
- 1863 - Il prestito dei 700 milioni e la riforma delle imposte, Torino
- 1877 - Memorandum sur la guerre actuelle Turco-Moscovite, Roma
- 1879 - Il trattato di Berlino, Roma
- 1879 - La situazione, Roma
- 1882 - La Riforma parlamentare, Roma
- 1903 - (published by S. Musolino) La Rivoluzione del 1848 nelle Calabrie, Napoli
- 1951 - (published by G. Luzzatto) La Gerusalemme e il popolo ebreo, Roma
- 1982 - (published by P. Alatri) Giuseppe Mazzini e i rivoluzionari italiani, Cosenza

== Honours ==
Commendatore dell'Ordine della Corona d'Italia - ribbon for ordinary uniform

Commendatore dell'Ordine della Corona d'Italia

Cavaliere dell'Ordine dei Santi Maurizio e Lazzaro - ribbon for ordinary uniform

Cavaliere dell'Ordine dei Santi Maurizio e Lazzaro

Cavaliere dell'Ordine militare di Savoia - ribbon for ordinary uniform

Cavaliere dell'Ordine militare di Savoia

Medaglia commemorativa delle campagne delle Guerre d'Indipendenza (3 barrette) - ribbon for ordinary uniform

Medaglia commemorativa delle campagne delle Guerre d'Indipendenza (3 barrette)

Medaglia a ricordo dell'Unità d'Italia - ribbon for ordinary uniform

Medaglia a ricordo dell'Unità d'Italia

== See also ==
- Freemasonry in Italy
- History of the Jews in Calabria
