= Larry Friedland =

US property developer

- Born: Lawrence Friedland; 1938 or 1939 (age 86–87)
- Known for: founder and 50% owner of Friedland Properties
- Spouse: Marilyn Friedland

Lawrence "Larry" Friedland (born 1938/1939) is an American billionaire property developer, particularly known for his ownership of more than 20 buildings on New York City's Madison Avenue.

== Early life ==
Friedland was studying to become a pharmacist in the late 1950s when he met Nathan Miller and switched to property.

== Career ==
In 1960, he and his late brother Melvin founded Friedland Properties. His first purchase was in 1962 with the help of Miller, when he bought a number of stores in Harlem including a Bickford's Coffee Shop, and "needed three mortgages and a loan to pay the $400,000 price tag".

He owns more than 20 buildings on New York City's Madison Avenue, as well as parking garages, parking lots and two luxury apartment buildings in the city. As of October 2015, Bloomberg calculates that his half share of Friedland Properties is worth $1.5 billion.

== Personal life ==
He is married to Marilyn Friedland. They have a daughter, Elizabeth Alixandra Friedland, a lawyer at Friedland Properties.
