= Michael W. Friedlander =

American physicist and skeptic (1928–2021)

Michael Wulf Friedlander
- Born: November 15, 1928; Cape Town, South Africa
- Died: April 29, 2021 (aged 92); St. Louis, Missouri, United States
- Education: University of Cape Town (MSc); University of Bristol (PhD)
- Known for: Cosmic rays and related infrared and gamma ray astronomy
- Spouse: Jessica Friedlander
- Children: 2
- Scientific career
- Fields: Astronomy
- Workplaces: McDonnell Center for the Space Sciences; Washington University in St. Louis

Michael Wulf Friedlander (November 15, 1928 – April 29, 2021) was a South African-born American physicist and skeptic. Friedlander was professor emeritus of physics at Washington University in St. Louis. His research involved the study of cosmic rays and gamma ray astronomy. He is the author of the book At The Fringes Of Science (1998), a scholarly study of fringe science. The book is notable for its criticism of the ideas of Immanuel Velikovsky.

== Education and career ==
Friedlander was born in Cape Town, South Africa in 1928. He attained his BSc in Physics and Applied mathematics at the University of Cape Town in 1948, followed by a MSc (Physics, First Class) in 1950. He served as a junior lecturer in physics at the University of Cape Town from 1951 to 1952.

He went to London to pursue a PhD at the University of Bristol where he was appointed as a research associate from 1954 to 1956. While at the University of Bristol he jointly published with M. G. K. Menon the discovery of beta decay of the kaon and the first precision measurement of the mass of the lambda-zero hyperon. In 1955 he completed his PhD (Physics) at the University of Bristol.

He joined the physics department of Washington University in August 1956 and was appointed Assistant Professor and later associate professor of physics. His aim was to replicate the Cosmic Ray Laboratory in which he had worked in Bristol. He investigated the elemental composition of light cosmic rays through studies of nuclear-emulsions obtained from high-altitude balloons.

In 1967 he was appointed Professor of Physics at Washington University. During the late 1960s, in collaboration with colleagues Joseph Klarmann and Robert M. Walker he studied the very rare ultra-heavy cosmic rays with atomic number greater than 26. He also investigated the effects of cosmic ray particles in dust and gas surrounding the stellar system Eta Carinae.

His interest in public understanding of science led him to establish the Saturday Science series of lectures aimed at the general public in 1994. He coordinated talks by colleagues and himself on a wide array of physics and other science topics. He continued to organize these lectures until he had to withdraw in 2015 due to failing health.

Friedlander was a member of the Greater St. Louis Citizens' Committee for Nuclear Information that initiated the Baby Tooth Survey. In this survey the baby teeth of school children, donated by the parents, were analysed to determine if children living near US bomb-test sites in the 1950s had been exposed to more radioactive strontium-90 than was usual.

Friedlander also served as interim chairman for the department of music at Washington University from 1984 to 1986.

=== Criticism of pseudoscience ===
Besides authoring the book At The Fringes Of Science, Friedlander also gave critical lectures opposing pseudoscience and, in particular, the pseudohistorical and pseudoscientific theories of Immanuel Velikovsky, such as Velikovsky's theory that the Earth had suffered catastrophic close contacts with Venus and Mars in ancient history, which Velikovsky published in Worlds in Collision. One such lecture was in November 1972 at the Philosophy of Science Association at a session entitled "Velikovsky and the Politics of Science". On this occasion, Immanuel Velikovsky and two of his supporters Lynn Rose and Antionette M. Patterson were present and also gave presentations.

== Recognition ==
Friedlander was a Guggenheim Fellow and visiting professor at Imperial College, London from 1962 to 1963. In 1975 he received the Alumni award for Teaching from Washington University. In 1993 he was awarded the Kemper Award for Innovative Teaching at Washington University.

In October 1999 Washington University created the Michael Friedlander Scholarship for undergraduate students.

His son David Friedlander created a memorial website for his father. The site covers not only Friedlander's cosmic rays research, but also a glimpse of his many other interests, both within the physics department and across the larger university community. The web is also a tribute to the breadth and depth and sheer number of years of commitment he demonstrated throughout his career. It also includes glimpses into his family life and hobbies.

== Selected publications ==
- Astronomy, from Stonehenge to quasars. Englewood Cliffs, N.J: Prentice-Hall. 1985. ISBN 978-0-13-049867-0. OCLC 11289172.
- Cosmic rays. Cambridge, Mass: Harvard University Press. 1989. ISBN 978-0-674-17458-0. OCLC 18380025.
- At The Fringes Of Science. City: Routledge. 2018. ISBN 978-0-429-97071-9. OCLC 1028812525.
- Thin cosmic rain: particles from outer space. Cambridge: Harvard Univ Press. 2002. ISBN 978-0-674-00989-9. OCLC 228125168.

At The Fringes of Science was critically reviewed by Brian Martin in 1995. The review is full of praise for the book and includes phrases such as "This is the sort of book that many scientists might write if they investigated the issues and learned to communicate effectively to nonscientists." The review is critical of Friedlander's "dismissal of constructivism" in favour of "conventional positivist views about science."
