= Zvi Hirsch Kalischer =

Orthodox Jewish Rabbi and Zionist (1795–1874)

Zvi (Zwi) Hirsch Kalischer
- צבי הירש קלישר
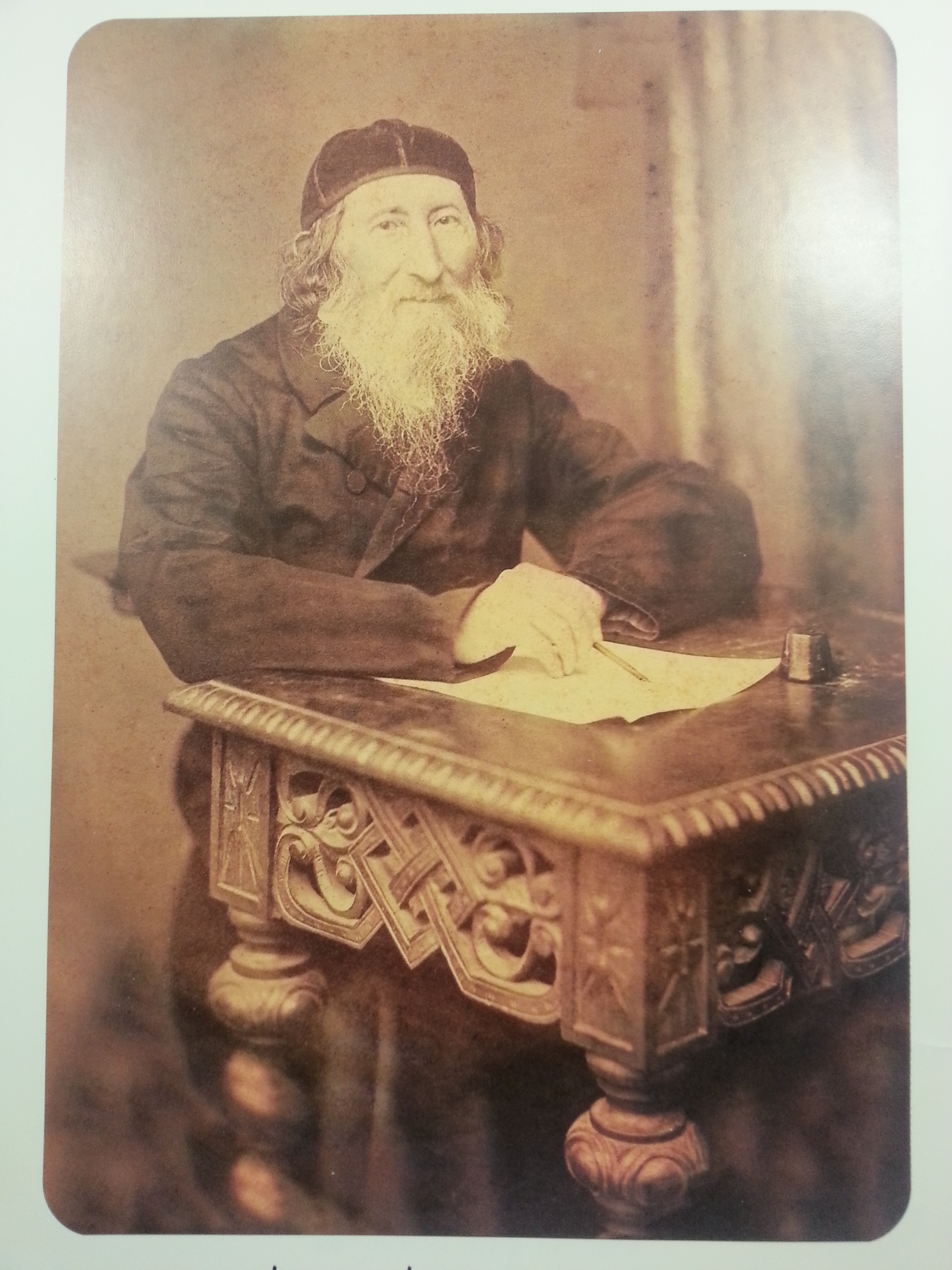
- Zvi Hirsch Kalischer
- Born: March 24, 1795; Lissa, Province of Posen, Kingdom of Prussia, Holy Roman Empire (today Leszno, Poland)
- Died: October 16, 1874 (aged 79); Thorn, Prussia, German Empire (today Toruń, Poland)
- Occupation: Rabbi

Zvi (Zwi) Hirsch Kalischer (Hebrew:צבי הירש קלישר)(24 March 1795 – 16 October 1874) was an Orthodox German rabbi who expressed views, from a religious perspective, in favour of the Jewish re-settlement of the Land of Israel, which predate Theodor Herzl and the Zionist movement. He was the grandfather of Salomon Kalischer.

== Life ==
Kalischer was born in Lissa in the Prussian Province of Posen (now Leszno in Poland). Destined for the rabbinate, he received his Talmudic education from Jacob of Lissa and Rabbi Akiva Eiger of Posen.

It is suggested that Kalischer's early life in an area which was annexed by Prussia, introduced him to the modern ideas of emancipation and enlightenment emanating from Berlin. This encounter with modern ideas together with his traditional Talmudic scholarship serve as the background for his eventual fusion of Eastern European Jewish longing for redemption and Western European nationalistic and social values.

After his marriage he left Jacob of Lissa and returned to Thorn, a city on the Vistula River, then in Prussia and now Toruń, in northern Poland, where his father R. Salomon Kalischer (ca.1768, Lissa-1840, Thorn) had moved the family in 1807, and where he spent the rest of his life.

In Toruń, he took an active interest in the affairs of the Jewish community, and for more than forty years held the office of Rabbinatsverweser ("acting rabbi"). Disinterestedness was a prominent feature of his character; he refused to accept any remuneration for his services. His wife, by means of a small business, provided their meager subsistence.

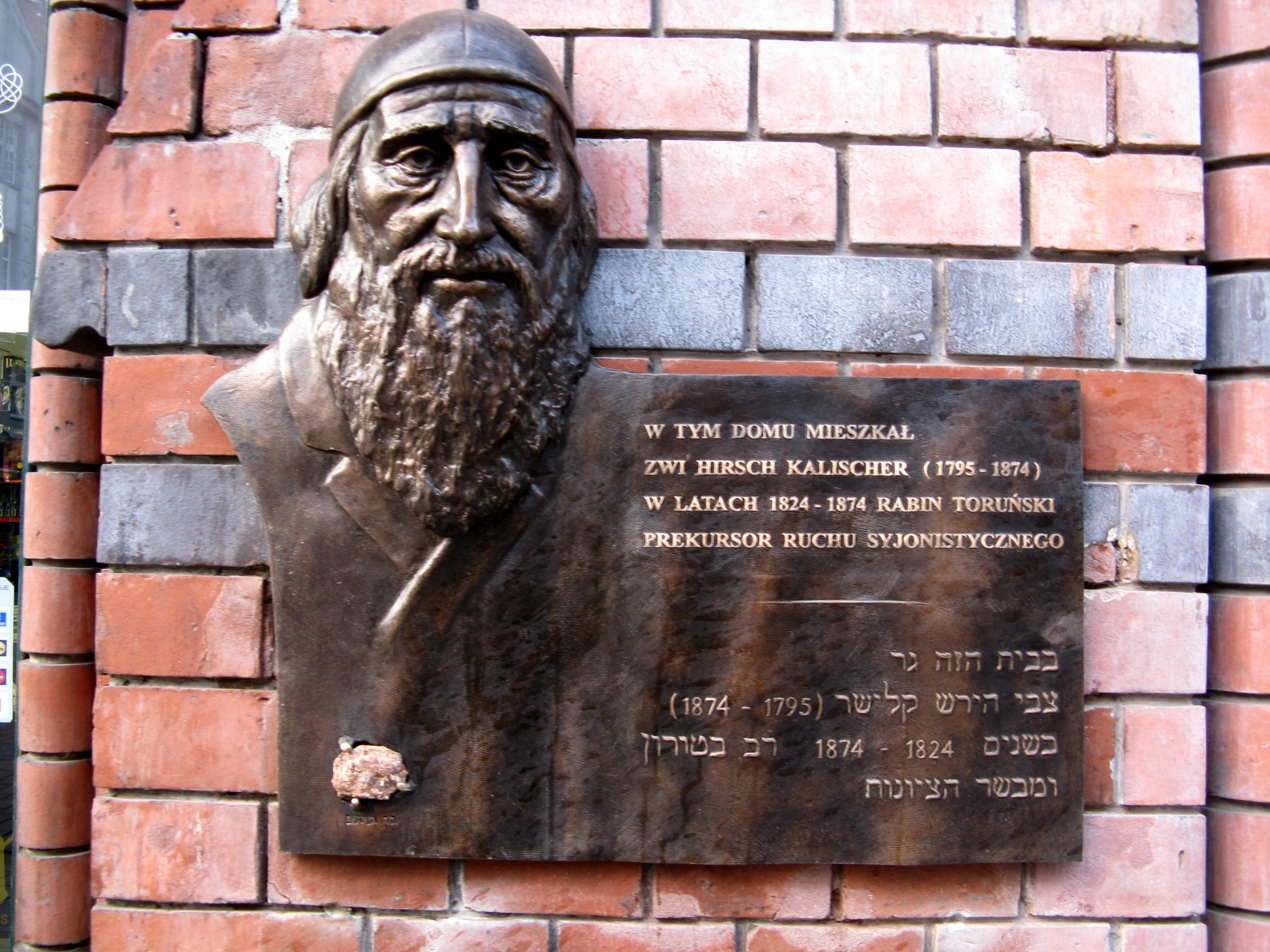
Plaque to Kalisher on building in Toruń Old Town

The name Zvi Hirsh is a bilingual tautological name in Yiddish. It means literally "deer-deer" and is traceable back to the Hebrew word צבי tsvi "deer" and the German word Hirsch "deer".

== Works ==
In his youth he wrote Eben Bochan, a commentary on several juridical themes of the Shulkhan Arukh, Choshen Mishpat (Krotoschin, 1842), and Sefer Moznayim la-Mishpat, a commentary, in three parts on the whole Choshen Mishpat (parts i. and ii., Krotoschin and Königsberg, 1855; part iii. still in manuscript). He also wrote: Tzvi L'Tzadik (צבי לצדיק) glosses on the Shulkhan Arukh, Yoreh De'ah, published in the new Vilna edition of that work; the Sefer ha-Berit commentary on the Pentateuch; the Sefer Yetzi'at Mitzrayim commentary on the Passover Pesach Haggadah; Chiddushim on several Talmudical treatises; etc. He also contributed largely to Hebrew magazines, as Ha-Maggid, Tziyyon, Ha-'Ibri, and Ha-Lebanon.

== Views on the re-settlement of the Land of Israel ==
Inclined to philosophical speculation, Kalischer studied the systems of medieval and modern Jewish and Christian philosophers, one result being his Sefer Emunah Yesharah, an inquiry into Jewish philosophy and theology (2 vols., Krotoschin, 1843, 1871); an appendix to volume 1 contains a commentary (incomplete) on Job and Ecclesiastes.

In the midst of his many activities, however, his thoughts centered on one idea: the settlement of the Land of Israel by Jews, in order to provide a home for the homeless Eastern European Jews and transform the many Jewish beggars in the Holy Land into a population which would be able to support itself by practicing agriculture.

He wrote in the Ha-Levanon, a Hebrew (at that period, a renovated language) monthly magazine. In 1862 he published his book Derishat Tzion (Lyck, 1862) on this subject, including many quotes from his commentaries in the Ha-Levanon magazine. He proposed:

1. To collect money for this purpose from Jews in all countries
2. To buy and cultivate land in Israel
3. To found an agricultural school, either in Israel itself or in France, and
4. To form a Jewish military guard for the security of the colonies.

He thought the time was especially favorable for the carrying out of this idea, as the sympathy of men like Isaac Moïse Crémieux, Moses Montefiore, Edmond James de Rothschild, and Albert Cohn rendered the Jews politically influential. To these and similar Zionist ideals he gave expression in his Derishat Zion, containing three theses:

1. The salvation of the Jews, which was promised by the Prophets, can only come about in a natural way — by self-help
2. Immigration to Israel
3. Admissibility of the observance of sacrifices in Jerusalem at the present day.

The appendix contains an invitation to the reader to become a member of the colonization societies of Israel.

The second part of the book is devoted to speaking to "the nations" which believe in the Bible and the prophets, and persuading them, that this new course in history is a logical one, and they too can hope for the salvation of the Jewish nation as part of the salvation of the entire world.

This book made a very great impression, especially in Eastern Europe. It was translated into German by Poper (Toruń, 1865), and a second Hebrew edition was issued by N. Friedland (Toruń, 1866). Kalischer himself traveled with indefatigable zeal to various German cities for the purpose of establishing colonization societies. It was his influence that caused Chayyim Lurie (Chaim Lorje 1821-1878) to form the first society of this kind (Association for the Colonisation of Palestine) in Frankfurt in 1860, and this was followed by the formation of other societies.

Owing to Kalischer's agitation, the Alliance Israélite Universelle founded the Mikveh Israel agricultural school in Palestine in 1870. He was offered the rabbinate, but he was too old to accept it. Although not all of these endeavors were attended with immediate success, Kalischer never lost hope. By exerting a strong influence upon his contemporaries, including such prominent men as Heinrich Grätz, Moses Hess (see Rome and Jerusalem, pp. 117 et seq.), and others, he is considered to have been one of the most important of those who prepared the way for the foundation of modern Zionism.

== Notable Opposition ==
Rabbi Samson Raphael Hirsch was vocally opposed to Kalischer's proto-zionistic views, writing “We are obligated to follow the ‘well-trodden paths of our ancestors and early leaders,’ who never mentioned any obligation for us to encourage the geulah (redemption) by developing Eretz Yisroel. They mention as the path toward the Redemption only that we become better Jews, repent, and look forward to the geulah.”

== Bibliography ==
- Allg. Zeit. des Jud. 1874, p. 757;
- Jüdischer Volkskalender, pp. 143 et seq., Leipsic, 1899;
- Sefer Anshe Shem, pp. 31a et seq., Warsaw, 1892.S. M. Sc.

== Article references ==
- Jewish Encyclopedia article on Tzebi Hirsch Kalischer
