= Albert Cohn (scholar) =

19th century French Jewish scholar (1814–1877)

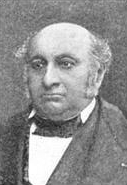
- Born: 14 September 1814; Pozsony, Hungary
- Died: 15 March 1877 (aged 62); Paris, France

Signature
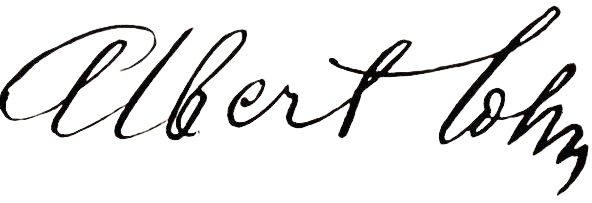

Albert Cohn (14 September 1814 – 15 March 1877) was a French Jewish philanthropist and scholar.

He belonged to an Alsatian family which had settled in Hungary during the eighteenth century. From 1824 to 1836 he lived in Vienna, studying first in the gymnasium and afterward at the university, and receiving in 1834 the degree of doctor of philosophy. He was then chiefly interested in Oriental languages, and, through the influence of Professor Wenrich, was engaged as teacher of Hebrew in the Protestant seminary. He was introduced at the same time to the Orientalist, Joseph von Hammer-Purgstall, who employed him as one of his secretaries.

Baron von Hammer-Purgstall was instrumental in forming Cohn's decision to leave Vienna, where at that time there was no hope of preferment for a Jew, and to settle in Paris, which he did in 1836. Then began his lifelong connection with the Rothschild family. Three of the children of Baron James de Rothschild received successively from him their instruction in Hebrew and in Jewish history; and in 1839, after a year spent with his pupils in Palestine and in Austria, he was placed by the baron and baroness in charge of their extensive charities, a position which he held for the remainder of his life.

Cohn worked for the charity commission of the Paris community, of which he was successively treasurer and president, making it a model for similar institutions throughout Europe.

His next field of activity was among the Jews of Algeria, under their French conquerors. In 1845, and again in 1847, he visited the country, often traveling through districts where war was raging, and where the life of a European was insecure. His reports, presented by him personally to King Louis Philippe and to his son, the duc d'Aumale, led to an organization of the Jewish communities of Algeria which was destined to bring about their gradual assimilation with the Jewish communities of France.

Cohn was again in Algeria in 1860, after visiting Morocco, where matters pertaining to the Jews, which required his attention, arose from the Spanish expedition of that year. Owing to his influence with the celebrated Don Juan Prim and others, these matters were solved in a manner that was favorable to the Jewish population.

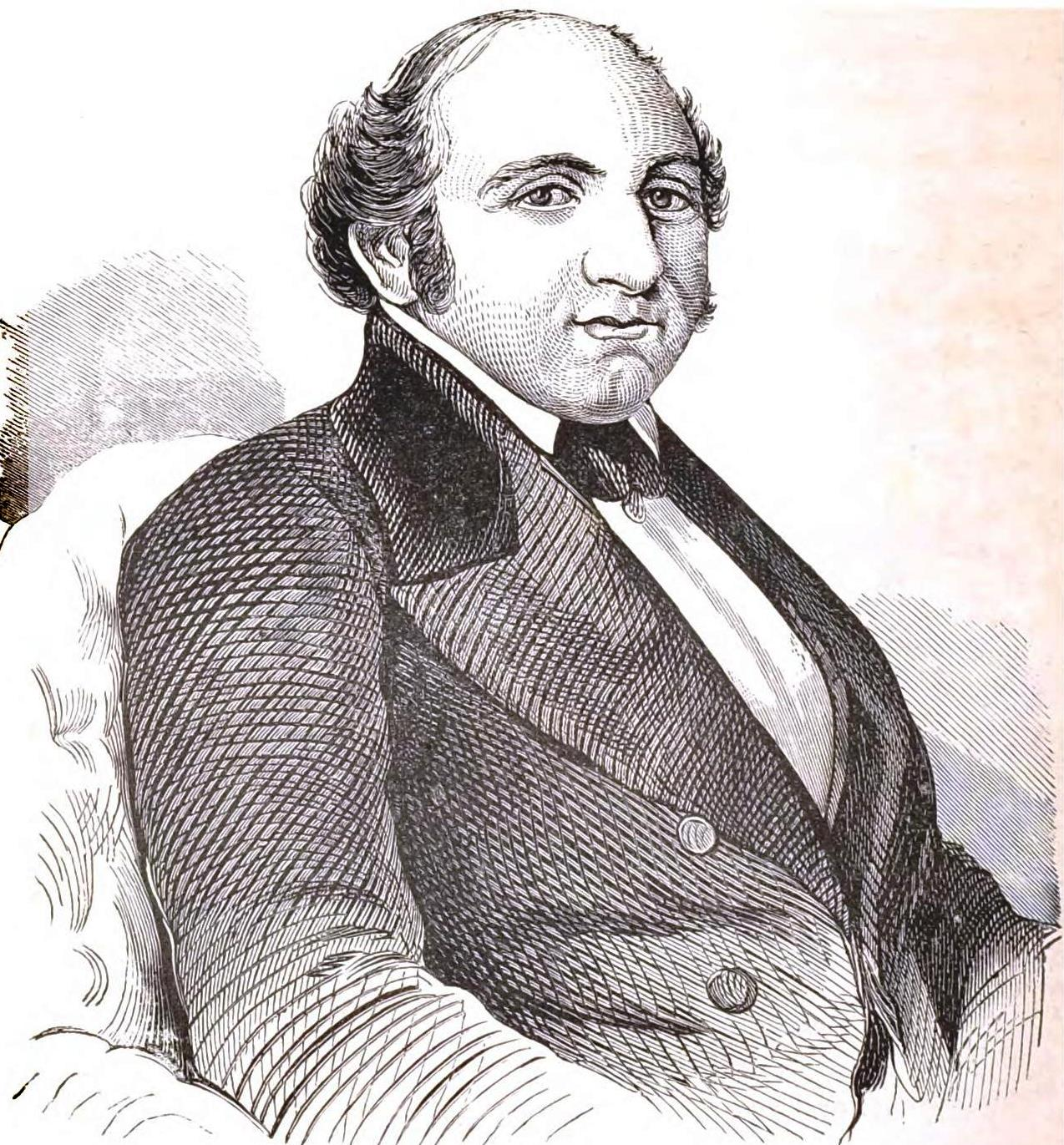
Albert Cohn

His activity in the East was equally important. He visited Jerusalem no less than five times between 1854 and 1869. His first voyage was undertaken at the request of the Consistoire Central des Israélites de France, which had been requested by Jews in every part of Europe to investigate the condition of their coreligionists of the Ottoman Empire, and to secure, through the influence of the European great powers, some alleviation of their condition. His first visit to Jerusalem (1854) was the first visible sign to the Jews of the Holy Land that an interest in their condition was being taken by their brothers of France, Italy, England, and Germany. Sums of money had already been sent by Sir Moses Montefiore; but Cohn was the first to see how matters really stood, and to apply the needed remedies. He was helped in the performance of his task by his linguistic gifts and knowledge of the idioms of the East. On this preliminary trip to the East, in the course of which he first passed through Vienna, he delivered addresses in German, Italian, Hebrew, and Arabic.

The result of Cohn's observations in Alexandria, Smyrna, Jaffa, and Jerusalem was the establishment in those places of Jewish hospitals and schools, as well as institutions for the assistance of young mothers, these organizations being supported mostly by the Rothschild family, but also by other benefactors. But Cohn's chief service was performed at Constantinople on his return journey from Jerusalem. He was received in private audience by Sultan 'Abd al-Majid, from whom he asked and received a promise that no improvements should be introduced in the legal conditions of the Christian subjects of Turkey which would not also apply to the Jews.

For years he delivered lectures on Jewish history before popular audiences; and he taught without remuneration in the Séminaire Israélite from the time of its transfer from Metz to Paris until a few months before his death. His large collection of philological works and rabbinical literature now forms a part of the library of that institution.

He had seat in the Consistoire Central des Israélites de France; and the French government bestowed upon him the Cross of the Legion of Honor. He also received the Grande Medaille of the Société Française pour l'Encouragement au Bien.
