= Hullin =

Tractate of the Talmud

Hullin or Chullin (Hebrew: חֻלִּין, romanized: ḥullin, 'ordinary' or 'mundane') is the third tractate of the Mishnah in the Order of Kodashim and deals with the laws of ritual slaughter (שְׁחִיטָה, sheḥitah) of animals and birds for meat in ordinary or non-consecrated use (as opposed to sacred use), and with the Jewish dietary laws (כַּשְׁרוּת, Kashrut) in general, such as the laws governing the prohibition of mixed consumption of meat and dairy.

While it is included in Kodashim, it mainly discusses non-consecrated things and things used as the ordinary human food, particularly meats; it is therefore sometimes called Sheḥitat Ḥullin (שְׁחִיטַת חֻלִּין, 'slaughter [of] ordinary [animals]'). It is composed of twelve chapters..

The rules prescribed for kosher (the adjectival expression of Kashrut) slaughtering include five things that must be avoided:

- There must be no delay during slaughter.
- No pressure may be exerted on the knife's moving backwards and forwards.
- The knife must not be allowed to slip beyond a certain area of throat.
- There must be no thrusting of the knife under the skin or between the gullet and windpipe.
- The gullet or windpipe must not be torn out of position in the course of slaughtering.

== Mishnah ==
The contents of the tractate's twelve chapters may be summarized as follows:

1. When, and by whom, an animal must be killed to be ritually fit for food; the instrument with which the killing must be done; the space within which the incision must be made, and the exceeding of which renders the animal terefah (טְרֵפָה, 'torn'). Incidentally, it discusses the differences between shekhita and melikah (the Temple-specific of slaughtering birds for sacrifice, as referenced in Leviticus 1:12 and 5:8), and the various degrees in which different vessels are susceptible to impurity.
2. The organs that must be severed: in quadrupeds, the trachea and the gullet, or the greater part of each, must be cut through; in fowls, cutting through one of these organs, or the greater part of one, suffices. In both cases, the jugular vein must be severed. Rules as to the character of the incision follow. Then comes a series of rules regarding animals killed in honor of foreign deities or of deified natural objects: regarding the localities where the formal killing of an animal might create a suspicion of idolatry; regarding the prohibition against using as ordinary food the flesh of animals killed for sacred purposes.
3. Animals injured by disease, accident, or animal attack. The Mishnah enumerates eighteen diseases and injuries which render an animal terefah, including perforations of the lungs or of the small intestines, and fractures of the spine or of the ribs. It also cites diseases and injuries that do not render the animal terefah, and concludes by listing the signs of kosher animals.
4. Embryos, living or dead, found in a slaughtered female animal; on the Caesarian section.
5. The prohibition against slaughtering an animal and its offspring on the same day. If both animals have been consecrated and killed within the Temple precincts, the animal first killed may be used, but not the second; the killer of the second is subject to kareth (כָּרֵת, 'cutting of'). If neither animal has been consecrated and both have been killed beyond the sacred precincts, the flesh of both may be used for food, but the killer of the second is subject to lashes. To prevent an unwitting violation of this prohibition, the cattle-dealer is required to notify the purchaser of the sale of the mother or the offspring for the meat market. This notice must be given whenever meat is in greater demand than usual, as on the eve of a festival.
6. The duty to cover the blood of ritually killed wild animals or birds (Leviticus 17:13), and the material with which it should be covered. This applies only to the blood of animals which, after being slaughtered, are found to be kosher, and only when the killing has been done on legitimate grounds.
7. The prohibition against eating the gid hanasheh (גִּיד הַנָּשֶׁה, 'sinew that was displaced'), which is always and everywhere in force, and which extends to consecrated and unconsecrated animals, and to the live young found in a slaughtered mother.
8. The prohibition against mixing milk and meat; "meat" includes any animal flesh except fish and locust. As a rabbinic addition, meat and milk should not be placed near each other on the dining table.
9. Carcasses and reptiles that communicate impurity by contact. Pieces from different parts of a neveilah (נְבֵלָה, 'carcass') are considered as one piece, and if they are collectively of sufficient bulk, they render impure any food with which they come in contact. For example, a piece of skin and a piece of bone or sinew, if together equaling an olive in size, render food otherwise pure to be impure.
10. The parts of every ritually killed animal which the layperson must give to the priest (i.e., the foreleg, cheeks and maw), and the rules concerning injured animals that should be presented to the priest or should be redeemed.
11. The duty of surrendering to the priest the first-fruit of the sheep-shearing. The differences between this duty and that treated in the preceding chapter; the number of sheep one must possess before this law comes into force; the circumstances under which one is exempt.
12. The law of shiluach haken (pronounced [/ʃiluˈaχ haˈken/]; שִׁלּוּחַ הַקֵּן, 'sending away [from] the nest'). This law applies only when the mother bird is actually in the nest with her young, and when the birds are nesting in the open, where they can easily escape. Non-kosher birds and "Herodian" birds (i.e., birds produced by mating different species, which is said to have been practised by Herod the Great) are not included in this law.

== Tosefta ==
The Tosefta and the Mishnah address similar topics in their first seven chapters. Chapter 8 of the Tosefta corresponds to chapters 8 and 9 of the Mishnah; chapter 9 to chapters 9 and 10; and chapter 10 to chapters 11 and 12. The Tosefta is more detailed and often includes episodes about prominent figures. For example, regarding the prohibition of meat prepared for idolatrous purposes, Tosefta Hullin 2:6 recounts Rabbi Eliezer ben Dama's final illness and alleged apostasy—events not discussed in the Mishnah or Talmud. The William Davidson Talmud cross-references Tosefta Hullin 2:6 in tractate Hullin 13a:14 and 40a:2, recording the Rabbis’ discussions of heretics’ and non-Jews’ slaughter but not mentioning ben Dama.

== Talmud ==
Mishnah Hullin is rarely cited in the Jerusalem Talmud; in fact, only 15 of the 75 mishnayot of the tractate are quoted, including parts of Mishnah Hullin 1:6, 1:7, 2:5, and 2:7, among others. The Babylonian Talmud, however, discusses and explains every section of the Mishnah and also much of the Tosefta. It affords a clear insight into the main object of the provisions of this treatise—the prevention of cruelty and pain, and the draining of every drop of blood from the body in order to render the flesh wholesome.

An illustration of the humanitarian intent of the tractate is found in the rule established by Rabbi Samuel of Nehardea: "When the tabbaḥ (טַבָּח, 'slaughterer') is not familiar with the regulations concerning shekhita, one must not eat anything slaughtered by him." Samuel summarized the laws of shekhita with five mishnaic terms: "shehiyyah" (שְׁהִיָּיה, 'delaying'), "derasah" (דְּרָסָה, 'trampling'), "ḥaladah" (חֲלָדָה, 'burrowing'), "hagramah" (הַגְרָמָה, 'cutting outside [the prescribed location]'), and "ʿiqqur" (עִקּוּר, 'tearing [out]'). Individuals must be vigilant to avoid all of these prohibited actions.

As in other tractates, halakhic discussions are interspersed with instructive and entertaining aggadot. In a statement of the marks by which kosher animals are distinguished from non-kosher ones, a unicorn is mentioned, and is said to be the gazelle of Bei Ila'ei (Jewish Babylonian Aramaic: דְּבֵי עִילַּאי, lit. 'house above'). The mention of Bei Ila'ei prompts discussion of the "lion of Bei Ila'ei" (אַרְיָא דְּבֵי עִילַּאי, aryeh d'Bei Ila'ei), and the compiler of the text proceeds to recount an elaborate story of a Roman emperor (קֵיסָר, kesár, 'Caesar') and Joshua ben Hananiah.
