= Chaim Loike =

American Rabbi (born 1977)

Chaim Loike (born 1977 in New York City to Marian Stoltz-Loike and John Loike) is an American Rabbi who works for the Orthodox Union Kosher. He is an expert on kosher species of birds. He is the director of the Biblical Ornithological Society.

== Kosher bird species ==
The Bible gives a list of non-kosher birds in Leviticus 11:13–19 and Deuteronomy 14:11–18. (See kosher animals for full article). However, today it is not clear which species the Bible had in mind. People who keep kosher rely on several rules listed in the Talmud and on tradition to know which birds may be consumed.

Jewish law also dictates that birds that interbreed can be considered members of the same species. This is one of the reasons why turkeys, which were unknown in the Middle East in ancient time, are considered kosher by many Jewish groups. Over the past decade, Chaim Loike has interviewed Jewish elders from far-flung communities, such as Afghanistan, to document their traditions regarding kosher bird species.

He has also extensively bred and raised many exotic birds in order to determine their kosher status. Loike worked extensively on different species of quails in order to determine if they are kosher, and his research was used by Rabbi Yisroel Belsky as the basis for his ruling on the matter. He has also written on the subject of partridges, ruling that several different species should follow the precedent set by the chukar partridge and be considered kosher. In another instance, he raised runner ducks.

Rabbi Loike lectures extensively for the Orthodox Union on the subject, often bringing live birds for the presentations. He is also a lecturer on a variety of topics at Touro College.

== Philby's Partridge ==
In 2013, Loike launched an online campaign to fund an investigation into the kosher status of Philby's partridge. He aimed to raise a captive population of this endangered species, indigenous to Northern Yemen. By proving the birds to be kosher, Loike hoped to create a market for them and thus stave off their extinction.

== Publications ==
Loike has compiled a source book on the subject of kosher birds and eggs, published by the Union of Orthodox Jewish Congregations of America.

Loike has also translated the Simla Hadasha in a book titled "The Laws of Shechita According to the Simlah Chadashah" and the Keset Sofer.
