= Covering of the blood =

Covering of the blood is a positive commandment enumerated among the 613 commandments in Judaism. After the slaughter has taken place, the shochet (butcher) is commanded to cover the blood of the slaughtered animal with dirt. This applies to birds or non-domesticated kosher animals.

The source of the commandment is Leviticus 17:13–14

And if any Israelite or any stranger who resides among them hunts down an animal or a bird that may be eaten, that person shall pour out its blood and cover it with earth. For the life of all flesh—its blood is its life. Therefore I say to the Israelite people: You shall not partake of the blood of any flesh, for the life of all flesh is its blood. Anyone who partakes of it shall be cut off.

== Details of the commandment ==
=== Who is Commanded ===
The mitzvah applies to the slaughterer. If he has not performed it, then it devolves on anyone, according to Maimonides.

=== The Blessing ===
The Jewish sages implemented a special blessing before doing this mitzvah: "Blessed are you Lord, our G-d, ruler of the universe, who sanctified us with his commandments and commanded us regarding covering blood with dirt"

== Rationale ==
There are several rationales given. The Sefer ha-Chinuch describes how given that "the blood is life", we cover it before eating the meat because there would be cruelty in eating the meat with the life in front of the eater (in the spirit of the prohibition on eating live meat).

According to Rav Kook, covering the blood was intended to express shame for killing the animal we eat, thereby educating humanity to gradually reduce its meat consumption.
