= Moshe David Tendler =

American rabbi (1926–2021)

Rabbi Moshe David Tendler
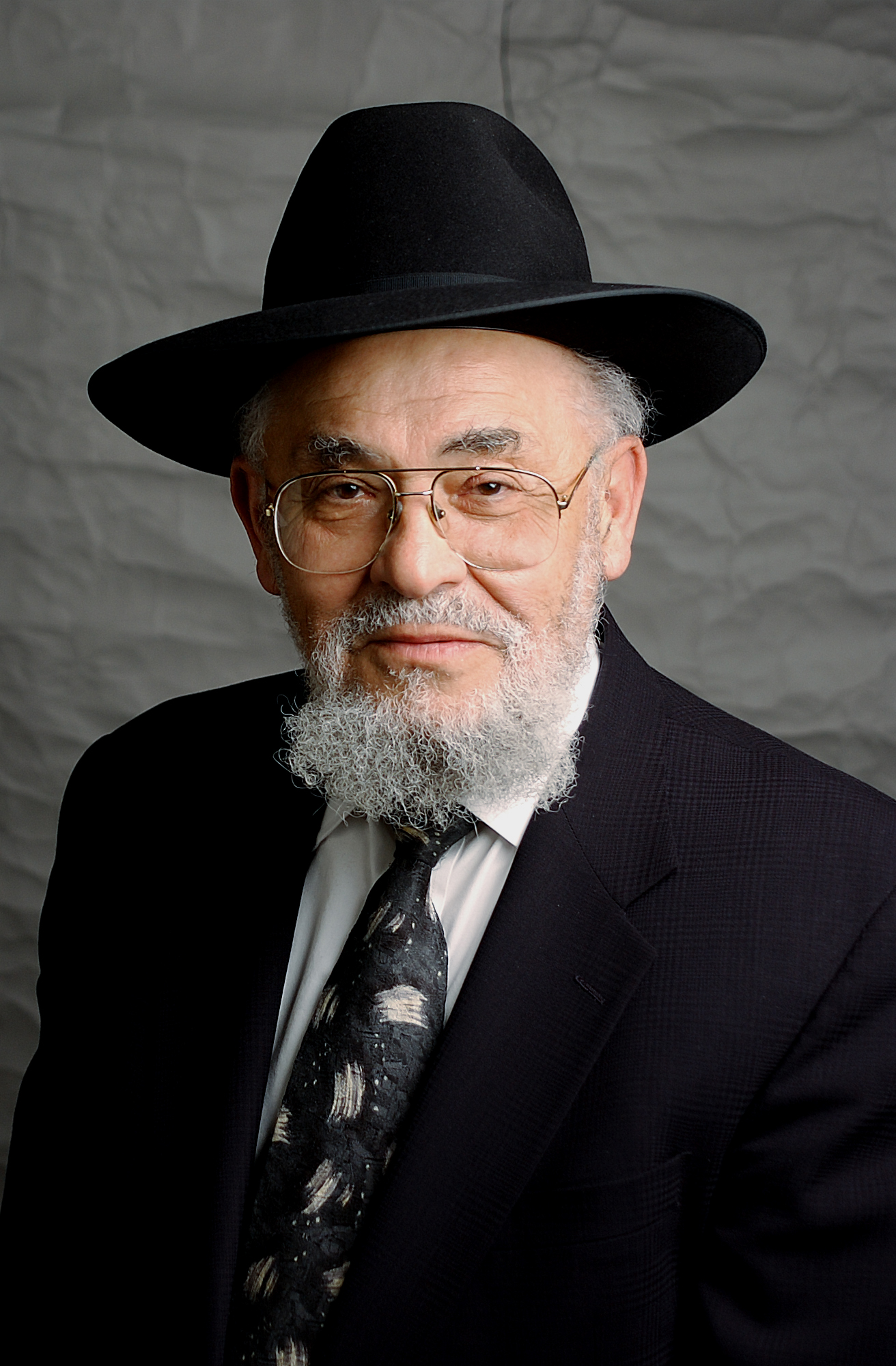

Personal life
- Born: August 7, 1926 Lower East Side, Manhattan, New York City, U.S.
- Died: September 28, 2021 (aged 95) Rochelle Park, New Jersey, U.S.
- Spouse: Shifra Feinstein
- Children: 8
- Education: New York University; Columbia University
- Occupation: Rabbi Isaac and Bella Tendler Professor of Jewish Medical Ethics and Professor of Biology at Yeshiva College

Religious life
- Religion: Judaism
- Denomination: Orthodox

Jewish leader
- Synagogue: Community Synagogue of Monsey
- Yeshiva: Rabbi Isaac Elchanan Theological Seminary (RIETS)
- Residence: Monsey, New York
- Semikhah: RIETS

Moshe David Tendler (August 7, 1926 – September 28, 2021) was an American rabbi, professor of biology and expert in medical ethics. He served as chairman of the biology department at Yeshiva University.

== Biography ==
Moshe David Tendler was born on the Lower East Side of Manhattan in New York City on August 7, 1926. He went to Rabbi Jacob Joseph School for the three years of high school and transferred to Marsha Stern Talmudical Academy for the last. He received his B.A. degree from New York University in 1947 and a master's degree in 1950. He was ordained at the Yeshiva University-affiliated Rabbi Isaac Elchanan Theological Seminary (RIETS) in 1949, and earned a Ph.D. in microbiology from Columbia University in 1957.

In 1951, Yeshiva University's Samuel Belkin encouraged Tendler to lead the Great Neck Synagogue for one year as an intern, thereby becoming the community's first rabbi. He later became the long-time rabbi of the Community Synagogue of Monsey, New York.

Tendler served as a senior rosh yeshiva (dean) at RIETS, and the Rabbi Isaac and Bella Tendler Professor of Jewish Medical Ethics and Professor of Biology at Yeshiva College. He was noted as an expert on Jewish medical ethics and their relationship to halakha (Jewish law).

Tendler was the son-in-law of Moshe Feinstein, a world-renowned posek. Some of Feinstein's "Iggerot Mosheh" responsa are addressed to his son-in-law. His wife, Shifra, died in October 2007. Tendler died on September 28, 2021, in Rochelle Park, New Jersey. They had 8 children.

== Medical ethics ==
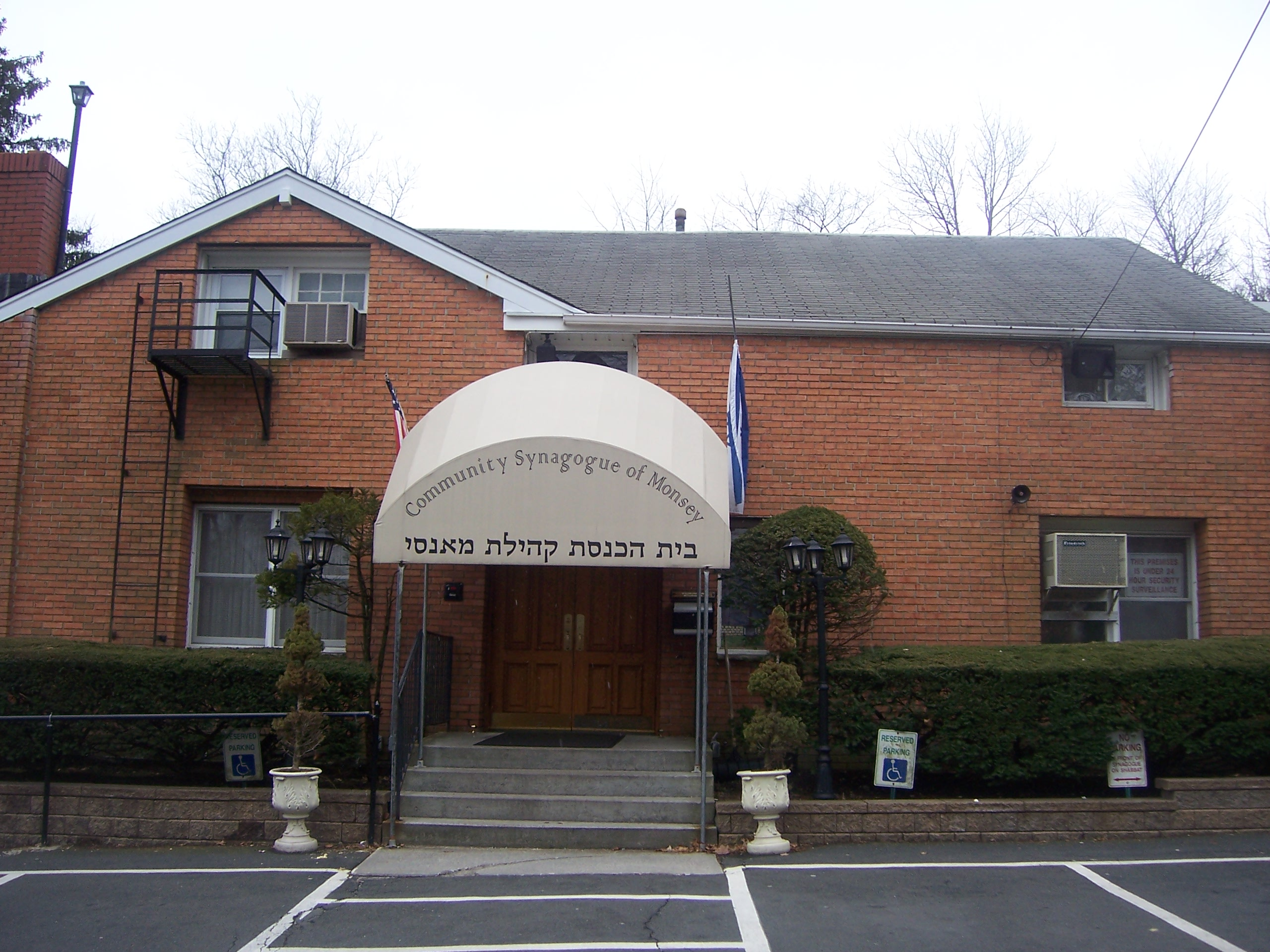
Community Synagogue of Monsey

Tendler wrote and lectured widely on medical ethics. He translated various medical-oriented responsa of Feinstein into English. Tendler advocated the theory that complete and irreversible cessation of function of the entire brain renders a person "physiologically decapitated", and they are thus considered legally dead according to Jewish law. Tendler also asserted that once organ donation has been deemed permissible under the given conditions, it is indeed mandatory, falling under the rubric of the legal obligation of Jews to preserve the lives of others. In addition, Tendler has written extensively on euthanasia, infertility, end of life issues, organ donation, and brit milah (Jewish circumcision). Tendler was a strong advocate for the use of a tube when performing metzitzah (suction of blood during circumcision). Serving on an RCA panel on stem cell research, Tendler expressed respectful disagreement with the Bush administration's position.

Tendler was the posek for the Association of Orthodox Jewish Scientists and its past president.

== Opinions ==
Tendler voiced his objection to the tactics employed by the New York divorce coercion gang, an outfit of rabbis that utilized kidnapping, and sometimes torture, to force Jewish men to grant their wives religious divorces, saying "The idea that a beth din can issue an order for coercion is baloney, a hoax." While conceding that he had had previous dealings with Mendel Epstein, a leader of that group, Tendler nevertheless characterized him as being "unreliable". Regarding Martin Wolmark, another member of that group, Tendler stated, "He's a very intelligent fellow, and he's American. I can't imagine him getting involved in such a dirty business." Epstein was later convicted of conspiracy to commit kidnapping, and Wolmark was convicted of conspiracy to commit extortion.

Tendler was responsible for the fact that modern-day Orthodox Jews in the United States and Israel generally do not consider swordfish to be a kosher fish. In order to be considered kosher under biblical law, fish must have both fins and scales, and while swordfish are born with scales, they shed them as they grow into adulthood. Orthodox opinion began to shift in 1951, after Tendler examined swordfish and decided that it was not kosher due to the lack of scales. Tendler's opinion provoked strong debate among halakhic authorities during the 1960s. Among Mediterranean Jews, however, there was a longstanding tradition (minhag) of considering swordfish kosher. Swordfish was, and possibly still is, consumed by Jews in Italy, Turkey, Gibraltar, Morocco, Tunisia, and England.

== Published works ==
=== Articles ===
- So One May Live - On the separation of Siamese twins.
- Dental Emergencies on the Sabbath written with Dr. Fred Rosner.
- Halakhic death means brain death - Explaining Tendler's position on the Jewish definition of death.
- Rav Moshe on Organ donation - Tendler's analysis of Moshe Feinstein's positions on organ donation.
- Molecular Genetics, Evolution, and Torah Principles - written with Dr. John Loike.
- How Should a Torah-Observant High School Biology Teacher Teach the Origin and Diversity of Species? - The Sixth Miami International Conference on Torah & Science, Excerpts of the Panel Discussion, December 13, 2005
- Erev Pesach that occurs on Shabbos

=== Books ===
- Pardes Rimonim: A Marriage Manual for the Jewish Family. KTAV, 1988. ISBN 0-88125-144-5.
- Practical Medical Halachah. Co-author: Fred Rosner, Jason Aronson, 1997. ISBN 0-7657-9990-1.
- Responsa of Rav Moshe Feinstein: Translation and Commentary KTAV, 1996. ISBN 0-88125-444-4
