= Martin Tillman =

Swiss cellist and composer (born 1964)

Martin Tillman (born 6 November 1964) is a Swiss cellist and composer.

== Biography ==
Tillman was born in Zürich, Switzerland, in 1964. He arrived in the United States in 1988. He has since performed/composed on numerous films, television shows, commercials and international tours. While receiving a master's degree in performance from the University of Southern California in 1989, he studied with Lynn Harrell. Tillman lives in Los Angeles.

Tillman wrote the score to the next Morgan Freeman-Clive Owen film Last Knights together with Satnam Ramgotra. He also scored the smartphone app movie Haunting Melissa 2: Dark Hearts and currently doing the score for A Bell For Ursli. For his previous solo composition, "A Year in Zurich" he performed both cello and piano. Preceding collaborative albums include: Eastern Twin (Rounders) and Cinematic Volunteer composed and produced by both Tillman and Tom Vedvik. The Poet, which was composed by Michael Hoppe, cello solos performed by Tillman and Afterglow composed and performed by Michael Hoppe, Tim Wheater, and Tillman.

Michael Mann's movie Ali features some original instrumental songs from his album Eastern Twin. After recording with Hans Zimmer on the Tony Scott movie The Fan, Tillman has composed and performed for scores such as Total Recall, Bullet to the Head, Brave Miss World, Admissions, Super Hybrid, My Father My Lord, Rush, the 84th Academy Awards, Life in a Day, Cowboys & Aliens, The Dark Knight Trilogy, The Da Vinci Code, Angels & Demons, Prince of Persia, Pirates of the Caribbean, Black Hawk Down, The Pledge, An Everlasting Piece, Mission: Impossible 2, Hannibal, The Ring, The Ring Two and others.

Tillman has performed with numerous recording artists including Toto, Sting, Elton John, T Bone Burnett, Alison Krauss, Elvis Costello, Beck, B.B. King, Wild Colonials, Air Supply, and Tracy Chapman among many others.

He has recorded the album Superhuman and will be touring nationally and internationally.
