= Simla Hadasha =

Rabbinic legal text

The Simla Hadasha (שמלה חדשה) is a compendium on the Jewish laws of ritual slaughter (Shechita). It was written by Rabbi Alexander Sender Shor in 1733.

== Author ==
Rabbi Shor was the son of Rabbi Ephraim Zalman Shor, a direct descendants of Rabbi Joseph Bechor Shor of Orleans, one of the most famous of the French Tosafists. Even in his youth, Rabbi Alexander Sender Shor was the Chief Justice of the Rabbinic Court in the town of Hovniv directly outside of Lvov. While his work was published he lived in the town of Zelkava. Rabbi Shor died on Tuesday, January 29, 1737, or the 27th of Shevat in the Hebrew year 5497. His tombstone is still extant in the Jewish cemetery in Zelkava.

== Acceptance ==
Use of the Simla Hadasha has become so ubiquitous that it has replaced the Shulchan Aruch as the definitive work on ritual slaughter in many communities, primarily the chassidishe and american communities. Any candidate who wishes to become a shochet (ritual slaughterer) is rarely tested by Rabbis on the laws found in the Shulchan Aruch—they are tested instead on his knowledge of the Simla Hadasha. The famed Rabbi Moshe Sopher, also known as the Chassam Sofer, describes the Simla Hadasha with the following words, "His words are the words of the Living God". The work was published well over one hundred times.

The Simla Hadasha has only been received universally by Hasidic and Ashkenazic Jewry. The Sephardic world has not embraced its use. Shechita historians have pointed out two possible reasons for this difference. The first reason is that the author of the Simla Hadasha has taken an extremely strong stand against the author of the Pri Hadash, a Sephardic luminary, stating that the work is filled with errors in that the author had only spent two years writing it. The second reason is that the Simla Hadasha is a proponent of the idea of rubbing (מיעוך) the Sirchos (lung adhesions). This is sheer anathema in the eyes of Sephardic codifiers. Perhaps the confluence of both reasons was responsible for the non-acceptance of the Simla Hadasha in the Sephardic world.

Many Israeli shochtim learn out of and are tested by the laws of the book beit david. {citation needed}

== Contents ==
The Simla Hadasha is in essence a restatement of the Yoreh De'ah section of the Shulchan Aruch that deals with the laws of ritual slaughter and some of the laws of defective animal lungs.

- Chapters one through five deal with the laws of the ritual slaughterer himself and his intentions.
- Chapters six through ten deal with the laws of the slaughtering knife.
- Chapters eleven and twelve deal with the place and time of ritual slaughter.
- Chapters thirteen through seventeen deal with the animal that was slaughtered.
- Chapters eighteen through twenty five deal with the procedure of slaughter.
- Chapters twenty six through twenty eight deal with various other laws.

The Simla Hadasha then skips to the section of Shulchan Aruch that deals with defects in the lungs and proceeds with a restatements of chapters thirty-five through thirty nine.
