= Milton Steinberg =

American rabbi, philosopher, theologian and author (1903–1950)

Rabbi Dr. Milton Steinberg
- Rabbi Milton Steinberg

Personal life
- Born: 1903 Rochester, New York
- Died: 1950 (aged 46–47)
- Children: Jonathan Steinberg, David Steinberg

Religious life
- Religion: Judaism
- Denomination: Conservative Judaism

Jewish leader
- Organisation: Park Avenue Synagogue

Milton Steinberg (November 25, 1903 – March 20, 1950) was an American rabbi, philosopher, theologian and author.

== Life ==
Born in Rochester, New York, he was raised with the combination of his grandparents' traditional Jewish piety and his father's modernist socialism. He graduated as valedictorian of his class at DeWitt Clinton High School and then majored in classics at City College of New York which he graduated from summa cum laude in 1924. Steinberg received his doctorate in philosophy from Columbia University in 1928 and then entered the Jewish Theological Seminary of America where he was ordained. In seminary, he was strongly influenced by Rabbi Mordecai Kaplan (1881–1983), the founder of Reconstructionist Judaism.

After five years in a pulpit in Indiana, he was invited by the Seminary to assume the pulpit of Manhattan's Park Avenue Synagogue, then a small congregation with a Reform orientation. In his sixteen years at the congregation, he grew it from 120 to 750 families. In 1943 he had a near fatal heart attack.

While a disciple of Kaplan who considered himself a Reconstructionist, Steinberg was critical of Kaplan's dismissal of metaphysics.

Steinberg's works included Basic Judaism, The Making of the Modern Jew, A Partisan Guide to the Jewish Problem and As A Driven Leaf, a historical novel revolving around the talmudic characters Elisha ben Abuyah and Rabbi Akiva. In his final years, he began writing a series of theological essays. This project, which he had hoped would conclude in a book of theology, was cut short by his death at age 46.

An unfinished second novel, The Prophet's Wife, about the Tanakh characters Hosea and Gomer, was published in March 2010.

== Publications ==
=== Non-fiction ===
- The Making of the Modern Jew (1934)
- A Partisan Guide to the Jewish Problem (1945)
- Basic Judaism (1947)
- A Believing Jew (1951)
- Anatomy of Faith (1960)

=== Novels ===
- As a Driven Leaf (1939)
- The Prophet's Wife (2010)

== See also ==
- Process theology
