= Elisha ben Abuyah =

Rabbi of end of Second Temple period

Elisha ben Abuyah (Hebrew: אֱלִישָׁע בֶּן אָבוּיָהּ, romanized: ʾĔlīšāʿ ben ʾĀḇuyāh) was a rabbi and Jewish religious authority born in Jerusalem sometime before the destruction of the Temple in 70 CE. After he adopted a worldview considered heretical by his fellow tannaim, the rabbis of the Talmud refrained from relating teachings in his name and referred to him as the "Other One" (אַחֵר, ʾAḥēr). In the writings of the Geonim, this name appears as "ʾAḥor" ("backwards"), because Elisha was considered to have "turned backwards" by embracing heresy.

== Youth and activity ==
Little is known of Elisha's youth and of his activity as a teacher of Jewish Law. He was the son of a rich and well-respected citizen of Jerusalem, and was trained for the career of a scholar. The only saying of his recorded in the Mishnah is his praise of education: "Learning Torah as a child is like writing on fresh paper, but learning Torah in old age is like writing on a palimpsest." Other sayings attributed to Elisha indicate that he stressed mitzvot (commandments) as equal in importance to education:

To whom may a man who has good deeds and has studied much Torah be compared? To a man who in building [lays] stones first [for a foundation] and then lays bricks [over them], so that however much water may collect at the side of the building, it will not wash away. Contrariwise, he who has no good deeds even though he has studied much Torah — to whom may he be compared? To a man who in building lays bricks first and then heaps stones over them, so that even if a little water collects, it at once undermines the structure.

He evidently had a reputation as an authority in questions of religious practice, since the Talmud records one of his halakhic decisions — the only one in his name, although others may be recorded under the names of his students or different rabbis.

== Hellenism and Heresy ==
Elisha was a student of Koine Greek; as the Talmud expresses it, "Acher's tongue was never tired of singing Greek songs". While still in the beth midrash, he is said to have kept forbidden books hidden in his clothes. Wilhelm Bacher, in his analysis of Talmudic legends, wrote that the similes attributed to Elisha (including the ones cited above) show that he was a man of the world, acquainted with wine, horses, and architecture. Some historians question his apostasy, as he is presented in the Talmud as a scholar with no mention of his theological departure.

Several stories are told in rabbinic literature about events leading to Elisha's apostasy:

- When he was in the womb before birth, his mother would pass by houses of idolatry and inhale the scent of the incense; this scent remained in him to affect him "like the venom of a snake".
- When Elisha was a baby, many rabbis were invited to his brit milah. When they began to teach the Talmud and to learn the inner depths of its meanings, "their appearance became of fire and the whole room turned ablaze" due to their sanctity. When Elisha's father entered the room and saw this, he decided to dedicate his child fully to Torah study, but because he did so with improper intentions, the dedication did not last.
- Elisha observed a child lose his life while fulfilling two laws for which the observance of the Torah promises a "long life" - honoring one's parents, and sending away a mother bird - whereas a man who broke the same law was not hurt in the least (the Talmud says that Elisha should have understood the "long life" to refer to a long life in the world to come).
- Elisha saw the detached tongue of Rabbi Hutzpit the Interpreter (one of the Ten Martyrs) being dragged through the streets, after his being murdered. He exclaimed in shock "Should a mouth which produced such pearls of torah, now lick the dust?"
- According to the Babylonian Talmud, he entered the "Orchard" (pardes) of esoteric knowledge, and saw the angel Metatron sitting down (an action that is not done in the presence of God). Elishah ben Abuyah therefore looks to Metatron as a deity and says heretically: "There are indeed two powers in Heaven!" The rabbis explain that Metatron had permission to sit because of his function as the Heavenly Scribe, writing down the deeds of Israel. The Talmud states, it was proved to Elisha that Metatron could not be a second deity by the fact that Metatron received 60 "strokes with fiery rods" to demonstrate that Metatron was not a god, but an angel, and could be punished.

== The four who entered the pardes ==
One of the most striking references to Elisha is found in a legendary baraita about four rabbis of the Mishnaic period (first century CE) who visited the pardes (Hebrew: פרדס orchard):

Four men entered the pardes — Ben Azzai, Ben Zoma, Acher [that is, Elisha], and Rabbi Akiva.... Ben Azzai looked and died... Ben Zoma looked and was harmed [i.e. went mad]... Acher chopped down the saplings; Akiva entered in peace and departed in peace.

The Tosafot, medieval commentaries on the Talmud, say that the four sages "did not go up literally, but it appeared to them as if they went up." Ginzberg, on the other hand, writes that the journey to paradise "is to be taken literally and not allegorically"; "in a moment of ecstasy [Elisha] beheld the interior of heaven", but "he destroyed the plants of the heavenly garden".

The Babylonian Talmud explains what Elisha "saw" as a mystical experience:

What is the meaning of "Acher destroyed the plants"? Of him scripture says: "Do not let your mouth cause your flesh to sin". What does this mean? Acher saw that Metatron had been granted authority to sit while he record the merits of Israel, and he said: "We have been taught that in heaven there is no sitting.... Perhaps there are — God forbid! — two supreme powers". They brought him to Metatron and they smote him with sixty bands of fire. They said to Metatron: "When you saw him, why did you not stand up before him?" The authority was granted to Metatron to erase the merits of Acher. A heavenly voice was heard: "'Repent, O backsliding children!' [All may repent from their sins...] except for Acher."

Whereas the Jerusalem Talmud seems to explain what Elisha "saw" as an earthly occurrence: humans suffering in a way that seemed to contradict the idea of reward and punishment.

The Jerusalem Talmud also describes Elisha's activities after becoming a heretic. It is said that he would kill any student who was succeeding in Torah study. Also, he would enter the beit midrash and see boys studying Torah, and recommend that they take trades such as building or carpentry, thus causing them to abandon their studies. Also, during the persecution (by Hadrian), when the enslaved Jews were attempting to perform their labor in a way that minimized Shabbat violation (i.e. two individuals each carrying part of a single load), Elisha would instruct the Romans to forbid this manner of labor, forcing the Jews to violate Shabbat to a greater extent.

=== Analysis of the Babylonian Talmud's account ===
Regarding the story in the Babylonian Talmud, Ginzberg comments that "the reference here to Metatron — a specifically Babylonian idea, which would probably be unknown to Palestinian rabbis even five hundred years after Elisha — robs the passage of all historical worth". Instead, he highlights the contrast between the accounts in the Babylonian Talmud and the Jerusalem Talmud, noting that the Jerusalem Talmud "makes no mention of Elisha's dualism; but it relates that in the critical period following the Bar Kokhba revolt, Elisha visited the schools and attempted to entice the students from the study of the Torah, in order to direct their energies to some more practical occupation; and it is to him, therefore, that the verse "Suffer not thy mouth to cause thy flesh to sin" is to be applied. In connection with this the biblical quotation is quite intelligible, as according to another aggadah, "flesh" here means children — spiritual children, pupils — whom Elisha killed with his mouth by luring them from the study of the Torah."

Others disagree with Ginzberg, suggesting that he failed to account for the regular travel of sages between Judea and Babylonia to collect and transmit scholarly teachings. Furthermore, scholar Hugh Odeberg has dated portions of the pseudepigraphal Third Book of Enoch, which discusses Metatron, to the first or second century CE, before the redaction of both the Jerusalem and the Babylonian Talmuds, and other scholars have found the concept of Metatron in texts older than 70 CE.

Medieval philosopher Rabbi Yehuda Halevi explained that the heightened spiritual experience of "entering the Pardes" brought Elisha to belittle the importance of practical religious observance:

The third one [Elisha] fell into bad ways, because he viewed the spiritual entities and said, "These deeds are but tools and preparations to attain that spiritual level. Having already reached this level, I have no need for the Torah's commandments." He became corrupt and corrupted others; he went astray and caused others to go astray.

Rabbi Alon Goshen-Gottstein argues that rabbinic stories should be read as literature rather than as history:

They [the rabbis] construct stories that are then integrated into larger ideologically motivated literary units in such a way as to impart particular ideological messages. The sources do not necessarily relate the historical facts about the heroes but they do illustrate the cultural concerns that find expression in the stories told about them. ... All this leads to the realization that the significant unit for presentation is not the life of the sage; it is the stories about sages. These stories are not formulated in an attempt to tell the life of the sage. They are told because the sage, as part of the collective culture, has some bearing on the common cultural concerns. Various anecdotes are coupled into a larger story cycle.

According to Goshen-Gottstein, Rabbinic Judaism was based on vigorous and often contentious debate over the meaning of the Torah and other sacred texts. One challenge facing the rabbis was to establish the degree of heterodoxy that was acceptable in debate. In this context, Elisha the heretic and Eleazar ben Arach represent two extremes in attitudes towards the Torah; actual rabbis and their arguments had to fit somewhere between these two limits.

== His heterodoxy ==
According to Louis Ginzberg "it is almost impossible to derive from rabbinical sources a clear picture of his personality, and modern historians have differed greatly in their estimate of him. According to Grätz, he was a Karpotian Gnostic; according to Siegfried, a follower of Philo; according to Dubsch, a Christian; according to Smolenskin and Weiss, a target of Akiva."

=== Elisha a Sadducee ===
Ginzberg suggests that Elisha became a Sadducee, since the Jerusalem Talmud mentions Elisha's betrayal of the Pharisees. Also, one of the reasons given for Elisha's apostasy is characteristic of a Sadducee perspective: Elisha is said to have seen a child lose his life while fulfilling two laws for which the observance of the Torah promised a "long life" - honoring one's father and mother, and sending away a mother bird, whereas a man who broke the same law was not hurt in the least. This encounter, as well as the frightful sufferings of Jewish martyrs during the Hadrianic persecutions, led Elisha to the conclusion that there was no reward for virtue. Thus, Ginzberg suggests that Elisha was a Sadducee, since Sadducee philosophy rejects an afterlife and argues that reward and punishment must occur on Earth (while Pharisee sages interpreted this passage as referring to life and reward in the next world). However, Elisha's abandonment of Jewish practice after his troubling encounters seems to indicate that, whatever his earlier philosophy, Elisha abandoned any form of Jewish religion.

=== Elisha an "Epikoros" ===
The harsh treatment he received from the Pharisees was due to his having deserted their ranks at such a critical time. Quite in harmony with this supposition are the other sins laid to his charge; namely, that he rode in an ostentatious manner through the streets of Jerusalem on a Yom Kippur which fell on Shabbat, and that he chose to overstep the techum. Both the Jerusalem and the Babylonian Talmuds agree here, and cite this as proof that Elisha turned from Pharisaism to heresy. It was just such non-observance of laws that excited the anger of Akiva.

Ginzburg writes that the mention of the "Holy of Holies" in this passage is not an anachronism, as Grätz thinks, for while it is true that Eliezer and Joshua were present as the geonim par excellence at Elisha's circumcision—which must, therefore, have occurred after the death of Johanan ben Zakkai (80)—it is also true that the "Holy of Holies" is likewise mentioned in connection with Rabbi Akiva; indeed, the use of this expression is due to the fact that the Rabbis held holiness to be inherent in the place, not in the building.

The same passage from the Jerusalem Talmud refers to Elisha as being alive when his pupil Rabbi Meir had become a renowned teacher. According to the above assumption, he must have reached his seventieth year at that time. Of all Elisha's colleagues he alone, perhaps in the hope of reclaiming him for Judaism, continued to associate with him and discuss with him scientific subjects, not heeding the remonstrances of some pious rabbis who regarded this association with some suspicion. Meir's attachment for Elisha was so great that on the death of the latter he is said to have spread his mantle over his friend's grave. Thereupon, according to a legend, a pillar of smoke arose from it, and Meir, paraphrasing Ruth 3:13, exclaimed, "Rest here in the night; in the dawn of happiness the God of mercy will deliver thee; if not, I will be thy redeemer". The same aggadah adds that at the death of Meir smoke ceased to issue from Elisha's grave.

== Modern cultural references to Elisha ==
=== Jacob Gordin's play Elisha Ben Abuyah ===
Jacob Gordin wrote a Yiddish play, Elisha Ben Abuyah (1906); it was performed unsuccessfully in New York City during Gordin's lifetime, and more successfully in numerous productions after his death; the title role was written for Jacob Adler, the only actor ever to play it. In the 1911 production after Gordin's death, the fallen woman Beata was played by Adler's wife Sara, Ben Abuyah's faithful friend Toivye Avyoini was played by Sigmund Mogulesko, and his daughter (who, in the play, runs away with a Roman soldier) by the Adlers' daughter Frances; in some of the last performances of the play, toward the end of Jacob Adler's career, the daughter was played by Frances's younger, and eventually more famous, sister Stella.

Gordin's Ben Abuyah is clearly a surrogate for Gordin himself, and to some extent for Adler: an unbeliever, but one who thinks of himself, unalterably, as a Jew, and who rejects Christianity even more firmly than Judaism, a man who behaves ethically and who dies haunted by a vision of "terrible Jewish suffering", condemned by the rabbis generally, but lauded as a great Jew by his disciple Rabbi Meir.

=== Milton Steinberg's novel, As A Driven Leaf ===
Conservative Rabbi Milton Steinberg fictionalized the life of Elisha ben Abuyah in his controversial 1939 novel, As A Driven Leaf. Steinberg's novel wrestles with the 2nd century Jewish struggle to reconcile Rabbinic Judaism both culturally and philosophically with Greek Hellenistic society. In Elisha's struggle, Steinberg speculates about questions and events that may have driven such a man to apostasy, and addresses questions of Jewish self-determination in the Roman Empire, the Bar Kochba Revolt (132-135), and above all the interdependence of reason and faith. Although the novel draws on Talmudic tradition to create the framework for Elisha's life, Steinberg himself wrote that his novel "springs from historical data without any effort at rigid conformity or literal confinement to them."

=== Shimon Ballas' novel, Outcast ===
Iraqi-Israeli author Shimon Ballas' novel Outcast, published in English in 2007, features an Elisha-like character. Outcast is narrated by Haroun Soussan, a Jewish convert to Islam. For Iraq, he left Judaism, embraced Islam, and fought Zionism as the nonpareil, ethnocentrist threat to his dreams. He has lost his closest friends because of politics, particularly Assad Nissim, a principled Iraqi Jew forced to depart for Israel. Despite everything Soussan believes and has done, however, what he was is not forgotten, and he feels an outcast not merely from the Jews and the West but within his homeland. Based on a historical figure, Ahmad (Nissim) Soussan's work ended up being used as anti-Jewish propaganda during the era of Saddam Hussein. Commenting on the use of Soussan's writing on Judaism by propagandists, his friend Assad Nissim likens him to Elisha Ben Abuya, or the one they called Aher, the Outcast. In Hebrew, the title of the book is V'Hu Aher, which means And He is an Other or And He is a Different One.

=== In Edward M. Erdelac's series, Merkabah Rider ===
Elisha is revealed to be the main antagonist of the series, a mystic driven mad by the sight of the Outer God Azathoth during his explorations of the seven heavens. His cutting of the root is a literal severance of the astral tether anchoring his soul to his own body.

=== In Tal M. Klein's novel The Punch Escrow ===
The story of Elisha's transformation into Aher is contrasted with the story of Job as an allegory for how the protagonist should bear with his current circumstances. A parallel is also drawn between his occupation of training artificially intelligent software agents and how asking difficult questions lead to Elisha's exile.

== See also ==
- Pardes (Jewish exegesis)
