= Joseph Molcho =

Greek rabbi and judge

Personal life
- Born: 1692 Thessaloniki, Greece
- Died: 1768 (aged 75–76) Jerusalem
- Parent: Rabbi Abraham Molcho (father)
- Notable works: Shulḥan Gavoah; Ohel Yosef; Zobach Todah
- Known for: Author of Shulḥan Gavoah, leading rabbinic figure in Thessaloniki
- Occupation: Rabbi, Judge, Author

Religious life
- Religion: Judaism

Joseph Molcho (Hebrew: יוסף מולכו; 1692 – 1768) was a rabbi and judge from Thessaloniki, Greece. He is considered one of the most important Greek-Jewish rabbis of his generation, having published several books, including the Shulḥan Gavoah (Hebrew: שולחן גבוה), a restatement of the Arba'ah Turim and the Shulḥan Arukh to reflect the dominant customs in Thessaloniki at the time. He moved to Jerusalem in 1750 and died there.

== Biography ==
Joseph Molcho was born in 1692 to Rabbi Abraham Molcho, a descendant of Jews who fled the Spanish Inquisition. He became the student of the chief rabbi of Thessaloniki, Joseph David. At eighteen he married and had at least three sons. He was considered an expert in shechita and became the head shokhet of Thessaloniki. In 1750 he left his children with his brother and moved to Jerusalem with his father.

== Books ==
- Shulchan Gavoah, a restatement of the Arba'ah Turim and Shulchan Aruch
- Ohel Yosef (אהל יוסף, a book of responsa first published in Thessaloniki in 1757
- Zobach Todah (זובח תודה) on the laws of shechita, first published in Thessaloniki in 1741
