= Outcast (Ballas novel) =

1991 novel by Shimon Ballas

Outcast, is a 1991 novel by Baghdad-born Mizrahi Israeli author Shimon Ballas. The novel was translated into English in 2005.

== Plot introduction ==
The subject of Outcast is a Jewish convert to Islam, Ahmad (Haroun) Soussan, based on the historical figure, Ahmad (Nissim) Soussa. After converting in the 1930s the real-life Soussa became a tool for propaganda under the Ba'athist regime. Ballas presents Soussan in a sympathetic light, giving voice to his complex relations with his Jewish family and friends, and his struggle as he moves from genuine conviction in Islam to the realization that he will never be fully at home in the Muslim sphere, just as he was not comfortable in the Jewish sphere. Ballas' treatment of Soussan suggests that the reader should attempt to comprehend the quandaries faced by those few Jews who sought to remain in Iraq in the years after 1948.

== Explanation of title ==
In Hebrew the novel is titled "V Hu Aher" ('And He is An Other,' or 'And He is a Different One') an apt expression of Soussan's ambiguous status between Jewish and Muslim identity, as a Jewish convert to Islam whose Jewishness is exploited for propaganda purposes by his cohorts within the Ba'athist political sphere. The word "Aher" refers to the ancient Jewish figure of Elisha ben Abuya, an apostate rabbi.

== Reception ==
The reception of Outcast in Israel was hardly positive to begin with, although it has been widely recognized elsewhere as a veritable compendium of information about Iraq from the 1930s to the 1980s. For this reason, some say that Outcast should be regarded as more of an Iraqi, than Israeli, novel, notwithstanding the fact that it was originally written in Hebrew and that Arab-Jewish authors have historically suffered a paltry audience in the Arabic-speaking world.
