= Terefah =

Kosher animal disqualified from being kosher

Terefah (Hebrew: טְרֵפָה, lit. "torn by a beast of prey"; plural טריפות treifot) refers to either:

- A member of a kosher species of mammal or bird, disqualified from being considered kosher, due to pre-existing mortal injuries or physical defects.
- A specific list of mortal injuries or physical defects that disqualify a member of a kosher species of mammal or bird from being kosher.

== Biblical prohibition ==
The biblical prohibition of eating terefah stems from the verse:

And you shall be holy people to Me, and flesh torn in the field you shall not eat; you shall throw it to the dog[s].

— Exodus 22:30

According to the Talmud, there were originally only eight types of terefah, however, the author(s) of the Mishnah added eighteen items to the list. Eventually, Maimonides added even more to finish the list of terefah conditions at 70. Rabbi Joseph Caro organized all of these symptoms in the Shulchan Aruch (Yoreh De'ah, 29-60) by categorizing them according to parts of the animal, their minute malady, and any disease, fracture, or abnormality they may possess.

This prohibition should not be confused with a separate category of prohibition, called nevelah (a carcass), of eating of any kosher species of mammal or bird which died by any means other than shechita. Thus, an animal could only be considered a terefah while alive; once it dies of its terefah wound it would be considered a nevelah. An important consequence is that a terefah which dies by shechita, while not fit for kosher consumption, does not have the status and rules of nevelah (e.g. with regard to imparting ritual impurity).

== The first eight types ==
The Talmud enumerates eight types of terefah that would make an animal unfit for ritual sacrifice according to Mosaic law: (Note: According to Maimonides, if one eats from an animal which naturally developed one of the enumerated terefot and then received shechita, they receive lashes by rabbinic rather than Biblical law (Sefer Hamitzvot, negative commandment 181))

- Clawing: the clawing of an animal by a wild beast or of a bird by a bird of prey.
- Perforation: a perforation to the cavity of one of the following 11 organs: the pharynx, the membrane of the brain, the heart and its aorta, the gall bladder, the vena cava inferior, abomasum, rumen, omasum, intestines, the lung and trachea.
- Deficiency: the absence from birth of one of the lobes of the lung, or one of the feet.
- Missing: the absence of converging sinews in the thigh, or the liver, or the upper jaw.
- Severing: the severing of the membrane covering the spinal cord whether the spinal column be broken or not.
- Falling: the crushing of one of the internal organs of an animal as the result of a fall.
- Tearing: the tearing of most of the flesh covering the rumen.
- Fracturing: such as the fracturing of most of its ribs.

== Influence in other languages ==
The Yiddish word טרייף, treyf, derived from terefah, refers to any non-kosher foods, not just those that fall under the category of terefah as described above. The Yiddish word and its verb form treyfn gave rise to the Polish word trefny, meaning 'deficient, illicit'.

Certain food taboos in Suriname are known in Surinamese Dutch as Dutch: Treef, derived from Sranan Tongo trefu and ultimately from terefah due to influence from Sephardi Jews who came to Suriname in the 17th century (similarly to Sranan kaseri 'ritually clean' from kosher).
