= As a Driven Leaf =

1939 novel by Milton Steinberg

As a Driven Leaf is a 1939 novel by Milton Steinberg based on the life of Elisha ben Abuyah.

Steinberg's novel wrestles with the 2nd century Jewish struggle to reconcile Rabbinic Judaism both culturally and philosophically with Greek Hellenistic society. In Elisha's struggle, Steinberg speculates about questions and events that may have driven such a man to apostasy, and addresses questions of Jewish self-determination in the Roman Empire, the Bar Kochba Revolt (132–136), and above all the interdependence of reason and faith.

Although the novel draws on Talmudic tradition to create the framework for Elisha's life, Steinberg himself wrote that his novel "springs from historical data without any effort at rigid conformity or literal confinement to them."
