= Shechita =

Ritual slaughter of an animal in Jewish law

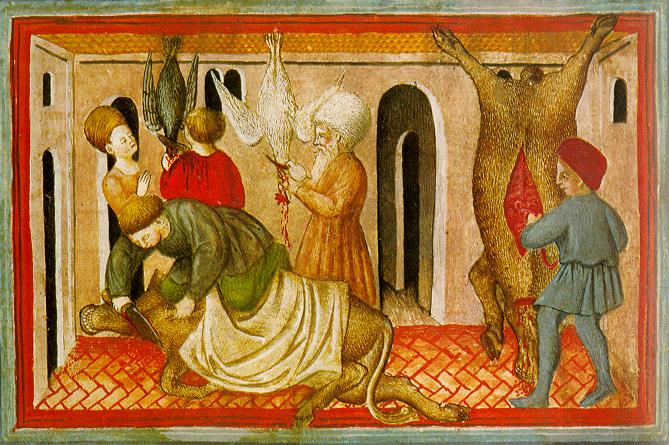
- A 15th-century depiction of shechita and bedikah

Halakhic texts relating to this article
- Torah: Deuteronomy 12:21, Deuteronomy 14:21, Numbers 11:22
- Mishnah: Hullin
- Babylonian Talmud: Hullin
- Mishneh Torah: Sefer Kodashim, Hilchot shechita
- Shulchan Aruch: Yoreh De'ah 1:27
- Other rabbinic codes: Sefer ha-Chinuch mitzvah 451

In Judaism, shechita (anglicized: /ʃəxiːˈtɑː/; Hebrew: שחיטה; [ʃχiˈta]; also transliterated shehitah, shechitah, shehita) is ritual slaughtering of certain mammals and birds for food according to kashrut. One who practices this, a kosher butcher, is called a shochet.

== Biblical sources ==
Deuteronomy 12:21 states that sheep and cattle should be slaughtered "as I have instructed you", but nowhere in the Torah are any of the practices of shechita described. Instead, they have been handed down in Rabbinic Judaism's Oral Torah, and codified in halakha.

== Species ==
The animal must be of a permitted species. For mammals, this is restricted to ruminants which have split hooves. For birds, although biblically any species of bird not specifically excluded in Deuteronomy 14:12–18 would be permitted, doubts as to the identity and scope of the species on the biblical list led to rabbinical law permitting only birds with a tradition of being permissible.

Fish and grasshoppers do not require kosher slaughter to be considered kosher, but are subject to other laws found in Leviticus 11:9-12, which determine that they are kosher only if they have both fins and scales.

== Shochet ==
A shochet (שוחט, "slaughterer", plural shochtim) is a person who performs shechita. To become a shochet, one must study which slaughtered animals are kosher, what disqualifies some animals from being kosher, and how to prepare animals according to the laws of shechita. Subjects of study include the preparation of slaughtering tools, ways to interpret which foods follow the laws of shechita, and types of terefot (deformities which make an animal non-kosher).

In the Talmudic era (beginning in 200 CE with the Jerusalem Talmud and 300 CE with the Babylonian Talmud and extending through the Middle Ages), rabbis started to debate and define kosher laws. As the laws increased in number and complexity, following ritual slaughter laws became difficult for Jews who were not trained in those laws. This resulted in the need for a shochet (someone who has studied shechita extensively) to perform the slaughtering in the communities. Shochtim studied under rabbis to learn the laws of shechita. Rabbis acted as the academics who, among themselves, debated how to apply laws from the Torah to the preparation of animals. Rabbis also conducted experiments to determine under which terefot animals were no longer kosher. Shochtim studied under these rabbis, as rabbis were the officials who first interpret, debate, and determine the laws of shechita.

Shochtim are essential to every Jewish community, so they earn elevated social status. In the Middle Ages, the shochtim were a close second to rabbis in social status. Shochtim were respected for committing their time to studying and for their importance to their communities.

An inspection (Heb. bedikah) of the animal is required for it to be declared kosher, and a shochet has a double title: Shochet u'bodek (slaughterer and inspector), for which qualification considerable study as well as practical training is required.

== Procedure ==
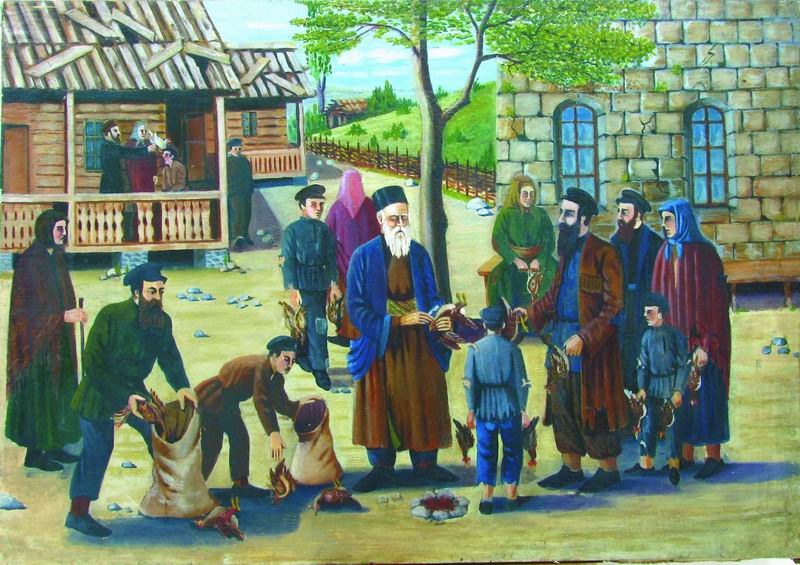
Slaughtering poultry according to religious rules, Shalom Koboshvili, 1940

The shechita procedure, which must be performed by a shochet, is described in the Yoreh De'ah section of the Shulchan Aruch only as severing the wind pipe and food pipe (trachea and esophagus). Nothing is mentioned about veins or arteries.

However, in practice, as a very long sharp knife is used, in cattle the soft tissues in the neck are sliced through without the knife touching the spinal cord, in the course of which four major blood vessels, two of which transport oxygenated blood to the brain (the carotid arteries) the other two transporting blood back to the heart (jugular veins) are severed. The vagus nerve is also cut in this operation. With fowl, the same procedure is followed, but a smaller knife is used.

A special knife of considerable length is used; no undue pressure may be applied to the knife, which must be very sharp. The procedure may be performed with the animal either lying on its back (שחיטה מונחת, shechita munachat) or standing (שחיטה מעומדת, shechita me'umedet).

In the case of fowl (with the exception of large fowl like turkey) the bird is held in the non-dominant hand in such a way that the head is pulled back and the neck exposed, while the cut made with the dominant hand.

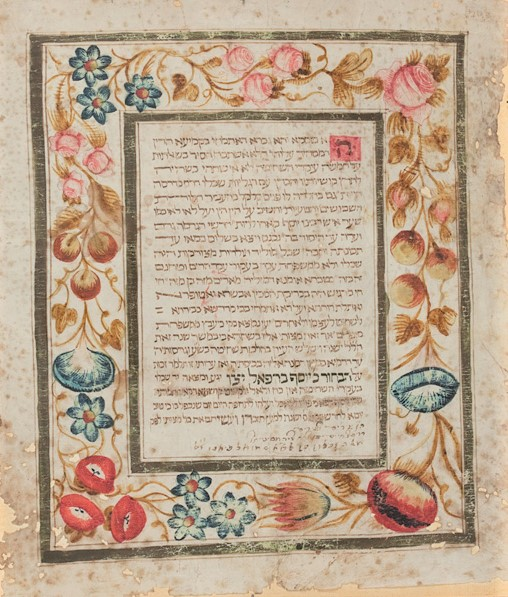
Shechita permit from Rome, 1762. Today in the Jewish Museum of Switzerland's collection.

The procedure is done with the intention of causing a rapid drop in blood pressure in the brain and loss of consciousness, to render the animal insensitive to pain and to exsanguinate in a prompt and precise action.

It has been suggested that eliminating blood flow through the carotid arteries does not cut blood flow to the brain of a bovine because the brain is also supplied with blood by vertebral arteries, but other authorities note the distinction between severing the carotid versus merely blocking it.

If the entirety of both the trachea and esophagus are not severed, then an animal may still be considered kosher as long as the majority of the trachea and esophagus were severed (windpipe and food pipe) of a mammal, or the majority of either one of these in the case of birds. The cut must be incised with a back-and-forth motion without employing any of the five major prohibited techniques, or various other detailed rules.

=== Forbidden techniques ===
1. Shehiyah (שהייה; delay or pausing) – Pausing during the incision and then starting to cut again makes the animal's flesh unkosher. The knife must be moved across the neck in an uninterrupted motion until the trachea and esophagus are sufficiently severed to avoid this. There is some disagreement among legal sources as to the exact length of time needed to constitute shehiyah, but today the normative practice is to disqualify a kosher cut as a result of any length of pausing.
2. Derasah (דרסה; pressing/chopping) – The knife must be drawn across the throat by a back and forth movement, not by chopping, hacking, or pressing without moving the knife back and forth. There are those who assert that it is forbidden to have the animal in an upright position during shechita due to the prohibition of derasah. They maintain that the animal must be on its back or lying on its side, and some also allow for the animal to be suspended upside down. However, the Rambam explicitly permits upright slaughter, and the Orthodox Union as well as all other major kosher certifiers in the United States accept upright slaughter.
3. Haladah (חלדה; covering, digging, or burying) – The knife must be drawn over the throat so that the back of the knife is at all times visible while shechita is being performed. It must not be stabbed into the neck or buried by fur, hide, feathers, the wound itself, or a foreign object (such as a scarf) which may cover the knife.
4. Hagramah (הגרמה; cutting in the wrong location) – Hagramah refers to the location on the neck on which a kosher cut may be performed; cutting outside this location will in most cases disqualify a kosher cut. According to today's normative Orthodox practice, any cutting outside this area will in all cases disqualify a kosher cut. The limits within which the knife may be applied are from the large ring in the windpipe to the top of the upper lobe of the lung when it is inflated, and corresponding to the length of the pharynx. Slaughtering above or below these limits renders the meat non-kosher.
5. Iqqur (עיקור; tearing) – If either the esophagus or the trachea is torn during the shechita incision, the carcass is rendered non-kosher. Iqqur can occur if the esophagus or trachea is torn out while handling an animal's neck or if the esophagus or trachea is torn by a knife with imperfections on the blade, such as nicks or serration. In order to avoid tearing, the kosher slaughter knife is expertly maintained and regularly checked with the shochet's fingernail to ensure that no nicks are present.

Breaching any of these five rules renders the animal nevelah; the animal is regarded in Jewish law as if it were carrion.

Temple Grandin has observed that "if the rules (of the five forbidden techniques) are disobeyed, the animal will struggle. If these rules are obeyed, the animal has little reaction."

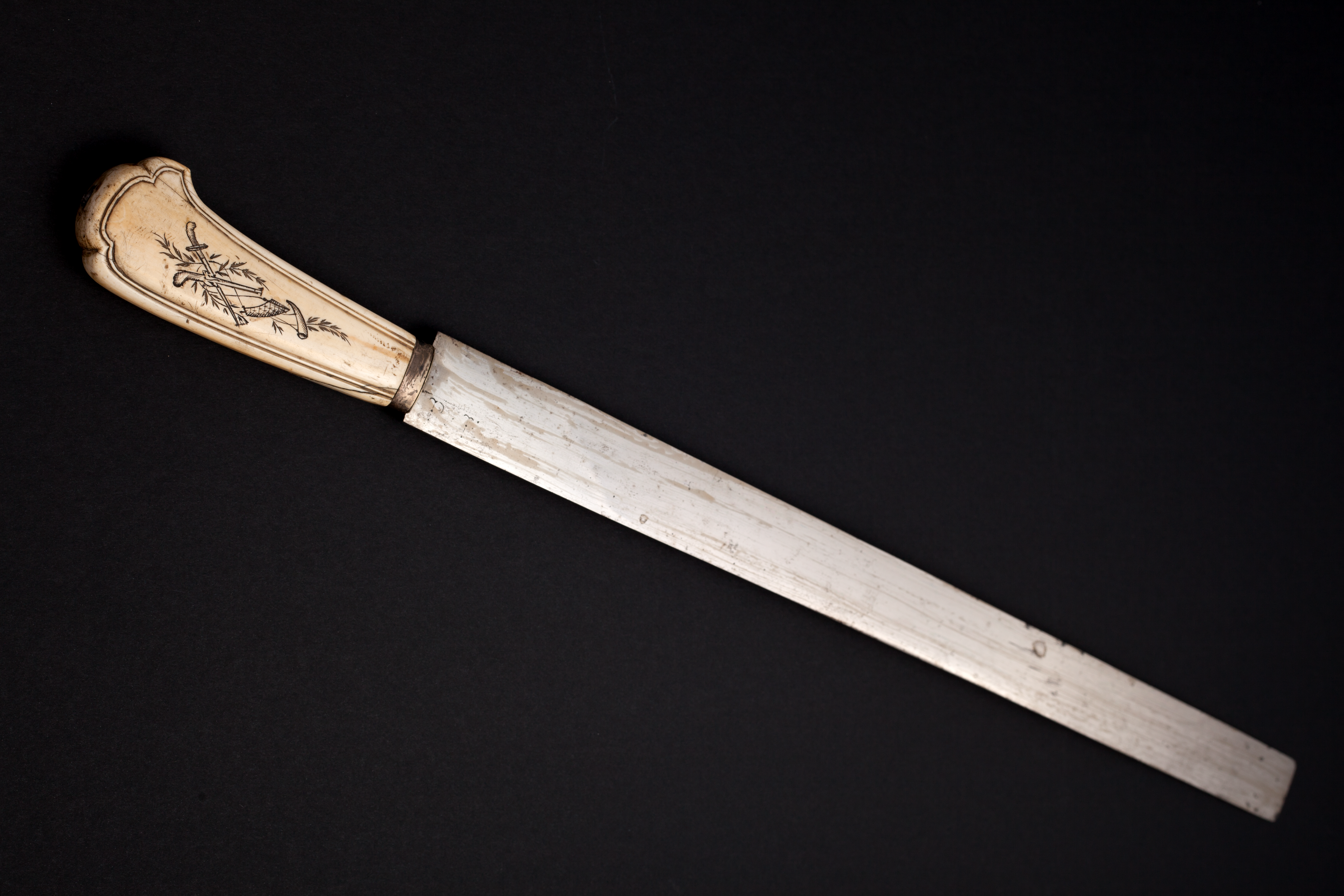
This chalaf belonging to the Jewish Museum of Switzerland dates back to the mid-18th century.

=== The knife ===
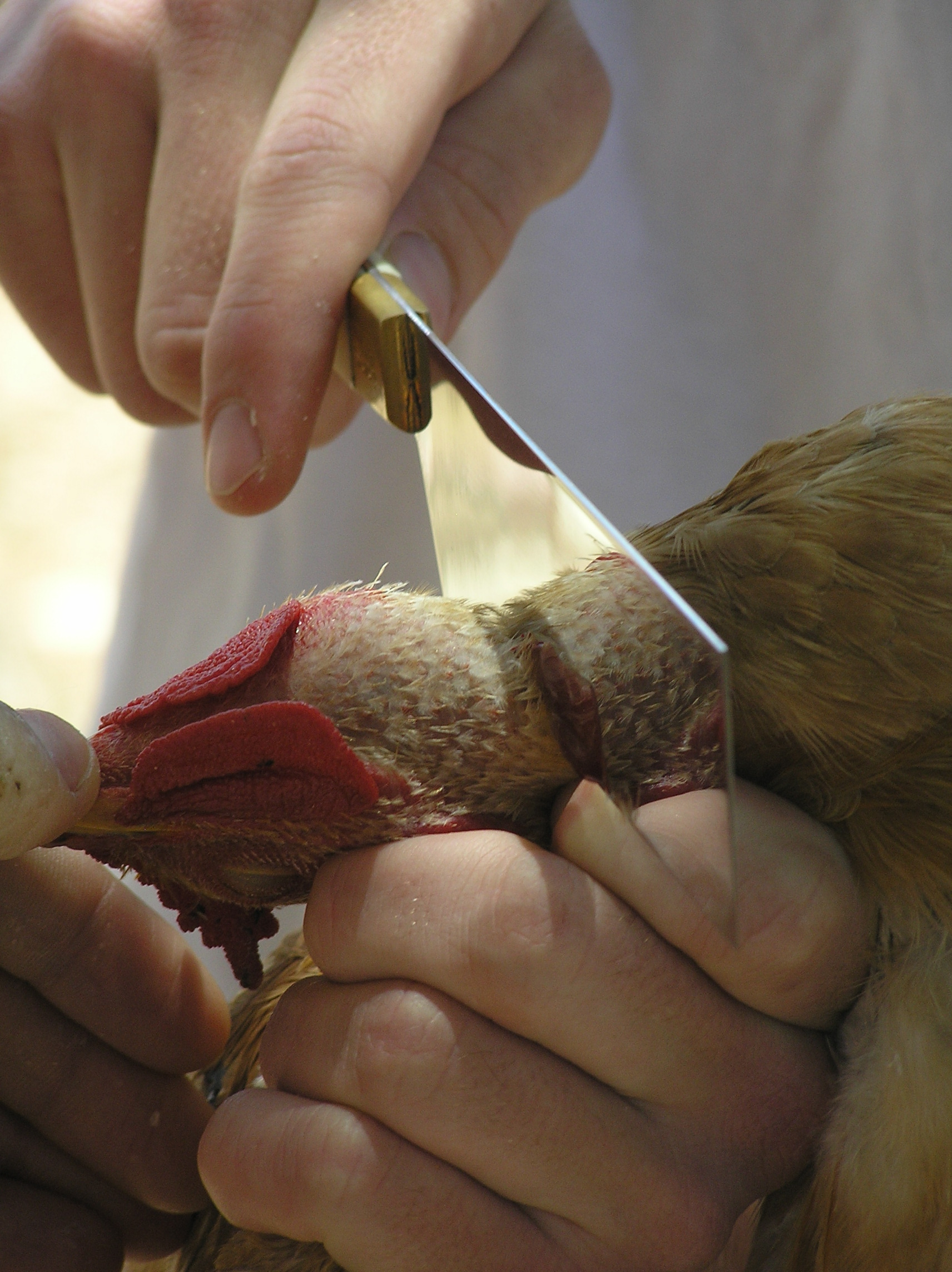
Shechita slaughter of a chicken

The knife used for shechita is called a sakin (סכין), or alternatively a chalaf (חלף) by Ashkenazi Jews. By biblical law the knife may be made from anything not attached directly or indirectly to the ground and capable of being sharpened and polished to the necessary level of sharpness and smoothness required for shechita. The tradition nowadays is to use a very sharp metal knife.

The knife must be at least slightly longer than the neck width but preferably at least twice as long as the animal's neck is wide, but not so long that the weight of the knife is deemed excessive. If the knife is too large, it is assumed to cause derasah, excessive pressing. Kosher knife makers sell knives of differing sizes depending on the animal. Shorter blades may technically be used depending on the number of strokes employed to slaughter the animal, but the normative practice today is that shorter blades are not used. The knife must not have a point. It is feared a point may slip into the wound during slaughter and cause haladah, covering, of the blade. The blade may also not be serrated, as serrations cause iqqur, tearing.

The blade cannot have imperfections in it. All blades are assumed by Jewish law to be imperfect, so the knife must be checked before each session. In the past the knife was checked through a variety of means. Today the common practice is for the shochet to run their fingernail up and down both sides of the blade and on the cutting edge to determine if they can feel any imperfections. They then use a number of increasingly fine abrasive stones to sharpen and polish the blade until it is perfectly sharp and smooth.

After the slaughter, the shochet must check the knife again in the same way to be certain the first inspection was properly done, and to ensure the blade was not damaged during shechita. If the blade is found to be damaged, the meat may not be eaten by Jews. If the blade falls or is lost before the second check is done, the first inspection is relied on and the meat is permitted.

In previous centuries, the chalaf was made of forged steel, which was not reflective and was difficult to make both smooth and sharp. Shneur Zalman of Liadi, fearing that Sabbateans were scratching the knives in a way not detectable by normal people, introduced the Hasidic hallaf (hasidishe hallaf). It differs from the previously used knife design because it is made of molten steel and polished to a mirror gloss in which scratches could be seen as well as felt. The new knife was controversial and one of the reasons for the 1772 excommunication of the Hasidim. As of present time, the "Hassidic hallef" is universally accepted and is the only permitted blade allowed in religious communities.

=== Other rules ===
The animal may not be stunned prior to the procedure, as has been common practice in non-kosher modern animal slaughter since the early 20th century.

It is forbidden to slaughter an animal and its young on the same day. An animal's "young" is defined as either its own offspring, or another animal that follows it around.

The animal's blood may not be collected in a bowl, a pit, or a body of water, as these resemble ancient forms of idol worship.

If the shochet accidentally slaughters with a knife dedicated to idol worship, he must remove an amount of meat equivalent to the value of the knife and destroy it. If he slaughtered with such a knife on purpose, the animal is forbidden as not kosher.

== Post-procedure requirements ==
=== Bedikah ===
The carcass must be checked to see if the animal had any of a specific list of internal injuries that would have rendered the animal a treifah before the slaughter. These injuries were established by the Talmudic rabbis as being likely to cause the animal to die within 12 months time.

Today all mammals are inspected for lung adhesions (bedikat ha-reah "examination of the lung") and other disqualifying signs of the lungs, and most kosher birds will have their intestines inspected for infections.

Further inspection of other parts of the body may be performed depending on the stringency applied and also depending on whether any signs of sickness were detected before slaughter or during the processing of the animal.

==== Glatt ====
Glatt (Yiddish: גלאַט) and halak (Hebrew: חלק) both mean "smooth". In the context of kosher meat, they refer to the "smoothness" (lack of blemish) in the internal organs of the animal. In the case of an adhesion on cattle's lungs specifically, there is debate between proponents of Ashkenazic customs and Sephardic customs. While there are certain areas of the lung where an adhesion is allowed, the debate revolves around adhesions which do not occur in these areas.

Ashkenazic Jews rule that if the adhesion can be removed (there are various methods of removing the adhesion, and not all of them are acceptable even according to the Ashkenazic custom) and the lungs are still airtight (a process that is tested by filling the lungs with air and then submerging them in water and looking for escaping air), then the animal is still kosher but not glatt.

If, in addition, there were two or fewer adhesions, and they were small and easily removable, then these adhesions are considered a lesser type of adhesion, and the animal is considered glatt. Ashkenazi custom permits eating non-glatt kosher meat, but it is often considered praiseworthy to only eat glatt kosher meat.

Sephardic Jews rule that if there is any sort of adhesion on the forbidden areas of the lungs, then the animal is not kosher. This standard is commonly known as halak Beit Yosef. It is the strictest in terms of which adhesions are allowed.

The Rema (an Ashkenazi authority) had an additional stringency, of checking adhesions on additional parts of the lung which Sephardi practice does not require. Some Ashkenazi Jews keep this stringency.

=== Nikkur ===
Porging (Note: The English word porge is from Judeo-Spanish porgar (from Spanish purgar "to purge"). The Hebrew is nikkur (niqqur) and the Yiddish is treibering. This is done by a menaḳḳer (Yiddish).) refers to the halakhic requirement to remove the carcass's veins, chelev (caul fat and suet) and sinews. The Torah prohibits the eating of certain fats, so they must be removed from the animal. These fats are typically known as chelev. There is also a biblical prohibition against eating the sciatic nerve (gid hanasheh), so that, too, is removed.

The removal of the chelev and the gid hanasheh, called nikkur, is considered complicated and tedious, and hence labor-intensive, and even more specialized training is necessary to perform the act properly.

While the small amounts of chelev in the front half of the animal are relatively easy to remove, the back half of the animal is far more complicated, and it is where the sciatic nerve is located.

In countries such as the United States, where there exists a large non-kosher meat market, the hindquarters of the animal (where many of these forbidden meats are located) is often sold to non-Jews, rather than trouble with the process.

This tradition goes back for centuries where local Muslims accept meat slaughtered by Jews as consumable; however, the custom was not universal throughout the Muslim world, and some Muslims (particularly on the Indian subcontinent) did not accept these hindquarters as halal. In Israel, on the other hand, specially trained men are hired to prepare the hindquarters for sale as kosher.

=== Kashering ===
Because of the biblical prohibition of eating blood, all blood must be promptly removed from the carcass.

All large arteries and veins are removed, as well as any bruised meat or coagulated blood. Then the meat is kashered, a process of soaking and salting the meat to draw out all the blood. A special large-grained salt, called kosher salt, is used for the kashering process.

If this procedure is not performed promptly, the blood is considered to have "set" in the meat, and the meat is no longer considered kosher except when prepared through broiling with appropriate drainage.

=== Giving of the Gifts ===
The Torah requires a shochet to give the foreleg, cheeks and maw to a kohen even though he does not own the meat. Thus, it is desirable that the shochet refuse to perform the shechita unless the animal's owner expresses their agreement to give the gifts. Rabbinical courts have the authority to excommunicate a shochet who refuses to perform this commandment.

The Rishonim pointed out that the shochet cannot claim that, since the animal does not belong to him, he cannot give the gifts without the owner's consent. On the contrary, since the average shochet is reputed to be well versed and knowledgeable in the laws of shechitah ("Dinnei Shechita"), the rabbinical court relies on him to withhold his shechita so long as the owner refuses to give the gifts.

== Covering of the blood ==
Full article: Covering of the blood

It is a positive commandment incumbent upon the shochet to cover the blood of chayot (non-domesticated animals) and ofot (birds) but not b'heimot (domesticated animals).

The shochet is required to place dirt on the ground before the slaughter, and then to perform the cut over that dirt, in order to drop some of the blood on to the prepared dirt. When the shechita is complete, the shochet grabs a handful of dirt, says a blessing and then covers the blood.

The meat is still kosher if the blood does not get covered; covering the blood is a separate mitzvah which does not affect the kosher status of the meat.

== Animal welfare controversies ==
=== In the United Kingdom ===
Tony Kushner noted in The Jewish Quarterly that "Opposition to the Jewish methods of slaughter has a long history, starting at least as far back as the mid-Victorian era."

In 2003, Compassion in World Farming supported recommendations made by the UK's Farm Animal Welfare Council, the government's animal welfare advise committee, of outlawing slaughter without stunning, stating that "We believe that the law must be changed to require all animals to be stunned before slaughter." The council's recommendations were that slaughter without pre-stunning was "unacceptable", and that the exemption of religious practices under the Welfare of Animals (Slaughter or Killing) Regulations 1995 should be repealed.

In 2004, the government issued its response to the FAWC's 2003 report in the form of a consultation document, indicating that the government was not intending to adopt the FAWC's recommendation to repeal religious exemptions to the Welfare of Animals Regulations (1995), but that it might consider implementing the labelling of meat originating from animals slaughtered without pre-stunning on a voluntary basis. The RSPCA responded to the government's consultation and urged it to consider the animal welfare implications of allowing continuation of slaughter without pre-stunning, as well as pressing for compulsory labelling of meat from animals slaughtered in this way.

However, in its final response to the FAWC report in March 2005, the government again stated that it would not change the law and that slaughter without pre-stunning would continue to be permitted for Jewish and Muslim groups.

In April 2008, the UK government's Food and Farming minister, Lord Rooker, stated his belief that halal and kosher meat should be labeled when sold, in order for members of the public to have choice over their purchases. Rooker stated that "I object to the method of slaughter ... my choice as a customer is that I would want to buy meat that has been looked after, and slaughtered in the most humane way possible." The RSPCA supported Lord Rooker's views.

In 2009, the FAWC again advised on ending practices of slaughtering wherein animals were not stunned before their throats were cut, stating that "significant pain and distress" was caused by leaving the spinal cord of the animal intact. However, the council also recognised the difficulties of reconciling scientific matters and those of faith, urging the government to "continue to engage with religious communities" as part of making progress. In response to outreach from The Independent, Massood Khawaja, then-president of the Halal Food Authority, stated that all animals passing through slaughterhouses regulated by its organisation were stunned, in comparison to those regulated to another authority on halal slaughter, the Halal Monitoring Committee. Halal and kosher butchers denied the FAWC's findings of cruelty in slaughter without pre-stunning, and expressed anger over the FAWC recommendation. Majid Katme of the Muslim Council of Britain also disagreed, stating that "it's a sudden and quick hemorrhage. A quick loss of blood pressure and the brain is instantaneously starved of blood and there is no time to start feeling any pain."

=== The Gutachten (expert reports) ===
When shechita came under attack in the 19th century, Jewish communities resorted to expert scientific opinions which were published in pamphlets called Gutachten. Among these authorities was Joseph Lister, who introduced the concept of sterility in surgery.

=== General description of controversy ===
The practices of handling, restraining, and unstunned slaughter have been criticized by, among others, animal welfare organizations such as Compassion in World Farming. The UK Farm Animal Welfare Council said that the method by which kosher and halal meat is produced causes "significant pain and distress" to animals and should be banned.

According to FAWC it can take up to two minutes after the incision for cattle to become insensible. Compassion in World Farming also supported the recommendation saying "We believe that the law must be changed to require all animals to be stunned before slaughter."

Mr Bradshaw said the Government had maintained its position in not accepting FAWC's recommendation that slaughter without prior stunning should be banned, as they respected the rights of communities in Britain to slaughter animals in accordance with the requirements of their religion.

The Federation of Veterinarians of Europe has issued a position paper on slaughter without prior stunning, calling it "unacceptable."

The American Veterinary Medical Association has no such qualms, as leading US meat scientists support shechita as a humane slaughtering method as defined by the Humane Slaughter Act.

A 1978 study at the University of Veterinary Medicine Hanover indicates that shechita gave results which proved "pain and suffering to the extent as has since long been generally associated in public with this kind of slaughter cannot be registered" and that "[a complete loss of consciousness] occurred generally within considerably less time than during the slaughter method after captive bolt stunning." However, the lead of the study William Schulze warned in his report that the results may have been due to the captive bolt device they used being defective.

Nick Cohen, writing for the New Statesman, discusses research papers collected by Compassion in World Farming which indicate that the animal suffers pain during the process. In 2009, Craig Johnson and colleagues showed that calves that have not been stunned feel pain from the cut in their necks, and they may take at least 10–30 seconds to lose consciousness. Temple Grandin argued that the 2009 study should be repeated using a qualified shochet and knives of the correct size sharpened in the proper way.

Jewish and Muslim commentators cite studies that show shechita is humane and that criticism is at least partially motivated by antisemitism. A Knesset committee announced (January, 2012) that it would call on European parliaments and the European Union to put a stop to attempts to outlaw kosher slaughter. "The pretext [for this legislation] is preventing cruelty to animals or animal rights—but there is sometimes an element of anti-Semitism and there is a hidden message that Jews are cruel to animals," said Committee Chair MK Danny Danon (Likud).

Studies done in 1994 by Temple Grandin, and another in 1992 by Flemming Bager, showed that when the animals were slaughtered in a comfortable position they appeared to give no resistance and none of the animals attempted to pull away their head. The studies concluded that a shechita cut "probably results in minimal discomfort" because the cattle stand still and do not resist a comfortable head restraint device.

Temple Grandin gives various times for loss of consciousness via kosher ritual slaughter, ranging from 15 to 90 seconds depending on measurement type and individual kosher slaughterhouse. She elaborates on what parts of the process she finds may or may not be cause for concern. In 2018, Grandin stated that kosher slaughter, no matter how well it is done, is not instantaneous, whereas stunning properly with a captive bolt is instantaneous.

=== Efforts to improve conditions in shechita slaughterhouses ===
Temple Grandin is opposed to shackling and hoisting as a method of handling animals and wrote, on visiting a shechita slaughterhouse,

I will never forget having nightmares after visiting the now defunct Spencer Foods plant in Spencer, Iowa, fifteen years ago. Employees wearing football helmets attached a nose tong to the nose of a writhing beast suspended by a chain wrapped around one back leg. Each terrified animal was forced with an electric prod to run into a small stall which had a slick floor on a forty-five-degree angle. This caused the animal to slip and fall so that workers could attach the chain to its rear leg [in order to raise it into the air]. As I watched this nightmare, I thought, 'This should not be happening in a civilized society.' In my diary I wrote, 'If hell exists, I am in it.' I vowed that I would replace the plant from hell with a kinder and gentler system.

Efforts are made to improve the techniques used in slaughterhouses. Temple Grandin has worked closely with Jewish slaughterers to design handling systems for cattle, and has said: "When the cut is done correctly, the animal appears not to feel it. From an animal-welfare standpoint, the major concern during ritual slaughter are the stressful and cruel methods of restraint (holding) that are used in some plants."

When shackling and hoisting is used, it is recommended that cattle not be hoisted clear of the floor until they have had time to bleed out.

=== Agriprocessors controversy ===
The prohibition of stunning and the treatment of the slaughtered animal expressed in shechita law limit the extent to which Jewish slaughterhouses can industrialize their procedures.

The most industrialized attempt at a kosher slaughterhouse, Agriprocessors of Postville, Iowa, became the center of controversy in 2004, after People for the Ethical Treatment of Animals released a gruesome undercover video of cattle struggling to their feet with their tracheas and esophagi ripped out after shechita. Some of the cattle actually got up and stood for a minute or so after being dumped from the rotating pen.

The OU's condonation of Agriprocessors as a possibly inhumane, yet appropriately glatt kosher company has led to discussion as to whether or not industrialized agriculture has undermined the place of halakha (Jewish law) in shechita as well as whether or not halakha has any place at all in Jewish ritual slaughter.

Jonathan Safran Foer, a Jewish vegetarian, narrated the short documentary film If This Is Kosher..., which records what he considers abuses within the kosher meat industry.

Forums surrounding the ethical treatment of workers and animals in kosher slaughterhouses have inspired a revival of the small-scale, kosher-certified farms and slaughterhouses, which are gradually appearing throughout the United States.

== See also ==
- Christian dietary laws
- Comparison of Islamic and Jewish dietary laws
- DIALREL – report from the EU
- Dhabihah – Islamic ritual slaughter
- Jhatka – Indian ritual slaughter
- Mashgiach
- Joseph Molcho
- Schochet – surname meaning "slaughterer"
- Tza'ar ba'alei chayim – Jewish commandment which bans causing animals unnecessary suffering
- Terefah controversy, a severe halakhic controversy about a specific type of terefah, among the Fez Jewry between Toshavim and Megorashim
