= Shiluach haken =

Jewish commandment

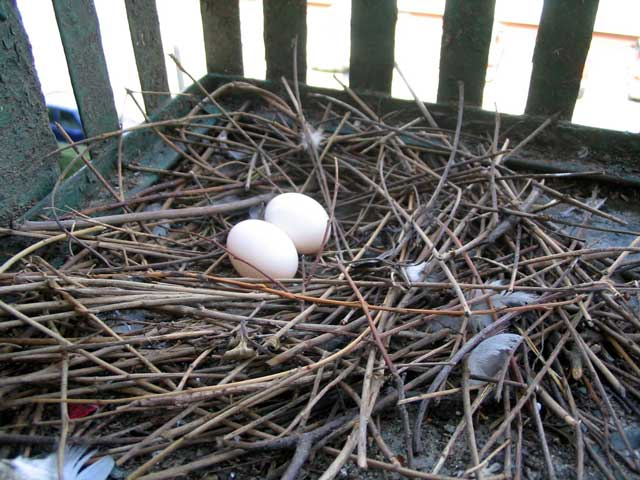

Halakhic texts relating to this article
- Torah: Deuteronomy 22:6
- Babylonian Talmud: Chullin 140b
- Mishneh Torah: Hilchot Schechita 13
- Shulchan Aruch: Yoreh Deah 292

Shiluach haken (Hebrew: שִׁלּוּחַ הַקֵּן, romanized: šillūḥ haqqēn, lit. 'sending away of the nest') is one of the 613 commandments in Judaism that enjoins one to scare away a mother bird before taking her young or her eggs.

The Torah promises longevity to someone who performs this commandment. In the Talmud, Elisha ben Abuyah is reputed to have fallen into disbelief after witnessing a boy dying from the fall after doing this commandment.

== Sources ==
The commandment is found in Deuteronomy 22:6–7:

Should a bird's nest appear before you on the way, on any tree or on the earth, chicks or eggs, and the mother resting on the chicks or the eggs: You shall not take the mother with the offspring. You shall send away the mother, and take the offspring for yourself, so that it be good for you, and your days be long.

== Theological ramifications ==
=== Compassion or cruelty? ===
Natan Slifkin has described two different approaches which Jewish thinkers have historically taken to this commandment. According to the rationalist approach, the purpose of the commandment is compassion: either to spare the mother bird the distress of seeing its eggs taken, or to limit the greed inherent in killing animals for one's use, or a similar reason. Conversely, the mystical approach sees the commandment as an act of cruelty to the bird rather than compassion: in fact, the bird's suffering causes God to consider Israel's suffering at the hands of its enemies, and thus leads God to rescue Israel.

This dispute has practical ramifications, as the rationalist approach rules the commandment can only be done when one plans to eat the eggs (thus minimizing the birds' pain when pain is unavoidable), while the mystical approach calls on Jews to shoo away any mother bird even if they do not plan to take the eggs (thus maximizing the birds' pain).

=== Theodicy ===
As this is one of the few individual commandments for which a specific reward is promised in the text, it became a locus classicus in Talmudic literature for discussion of theodicy.

One example of this is in Kiddushin 39b which discusses the problem whether the reward for commandments is in this world or the next. The explanation given in Pirkei Avot, is that the reward isn't in this world, but rather in Olam Habah, the next world.

In addition, the Talmud famously records that Elisha ben Abuyah saw a child fall off the ladder while performing this commandment at the behest of his parents: so, while performing two mitzvot (that is, both "sending-away the nest" and obeying one's parents), both of which are notable for their unusual promise of a reward of longevity. This irreconcilable lack of theodicy led him away from Judaism. The Talmud says had Elisha known that reward for a Mitzva is only in the next world, he would not have left Judaism.

== Cultural references ==
The metaphor of Shiluach haken is used in David Vollach's 2007 movie My Father My Lord, where the main character shoos away a mother bird just before the death of his own son, after the mother was "sent away" from the boy.
