= Prohibition against slaughtering an animal and its offspring on the same day =

Negative commandment in Judaism

Halakhic texts relating to this article
- Torah: Leviticus 22:28
- Mishnah: Hullin
- Babylonian Talmud: Hullin 78b-79a
- Shulchan Aruch: Yoreh De'ah 16

The prohibition against slaughtering an animal and its offspring on the same day is a negative commandment in Judaism which forbids the slaughter of a kosher four-legged animal and its offspring on the same day.

== Hebrew Bible ==
The commandment originates from a verse in the book of Leviticus that states:

But you shall not slaughter, from the herd or the flock, an animal with its young on the same day.

— Leviticus 22:28

The commandment is preceded by the instruction that a calf or lamb is only acceptable for sacrifice on the eighth day (22:26). The Hebrew Bible uses the generic word for bull or cow (Hebrew: שור showr), and the generic word for sheep and ewe (שה seh) and the masculine pronoun form in the verb "slaughter-him" (Hebrew shachat-u)

== Second Temple period ==
The earliest Jewish commentary on this commandment is found in the Temple Scroll among the Dead Sea Scrolls:

And an ox or a lamb with its offspring you may not slaughter at the same time. And you shall not strike the mother with her offspring.

— (11QT 52:5–7a)

The interpretation of the Dead Sea Scrolls differs from later rabbinical Judaism in prohibiting the slaughter of a pregnant animal.

In the Septuagint of Hellenistic Judaism the passage was translated with moschos - the generic Greek word for bull or cow or calf.

== Rabbinical interpretation ==
Obadiah of Bertinoro understood the prohibition to apply to both mother or father of the offspring. Rashi argued that the prohibition only applies to the mother; however Hizkuni argued that while the Biblical prohibition applies only to the mother, a rabbinic decree of lesser stringency also prohibits killing the father with its offspring. The Shulchan Aruch rules that it is uncertain whether the father is included, and therefore one must not slaughter the father with its offspring, but if done the punishment (whipping) cannot be applied.

The "day" in question is defined as running from evening to evening, similar to Shabbat. Therefore, one could permissibly slaughter an animal in the late afternoon, and its offspring shortly afterwards at nighttime.
