= My Father My Lord =

- Directed by: David Volach
- Written by: David Vollach
- Produced by: Eyal Shiray
- Starring: Assi Dayan; Ilan Griff; Sharon Hacohen
- Cinematography: Boaz Yehonatan Yaacov
- Edited by: Haim Tabacmen
- Distributed by: Kino International Corp.
- Release dates: 29 April 2007 (Tribeca Film Festival); 23 August 2007 (Israel)
- Running time: 73 minutes
- Country: Israel
- Language: Hebrew

My Father My Lord (Hebrew: חופשת קיץ, lit. Summer Vacation) is a 2007 Israeli drama film written and directed by David Volach. It won the Founder's Award for Best Narrative Film at the Tribeca Film Festival.

== Plot ==
Rabbi Avraham and his wife Esther have one son, Menachem, whose birth they regard as miraculous. Menachem's curiosity about the world is repeatedly stymied by his father, who in one instance forces him to rip up an "idolatrous" picture. Foreshadowed by an instance of Shiluach haken, a trip to the Dead Sea — the eponymous "summer vacation" — ends with Menachem drowning and his parents mourning.

== Reviews and Awards ==
Summer Vacation is the debut film by David Volach, a self-taught filmmaker who did not receive formal training in cinema, and it garnered rave reviews. Uri Klein wrote in Haaretz: "My immediate reaction to Summer Vacation is surprise and excitement, even shock. This is a complete and mature work by a true artist who seems to have emerged in Israeli cinema from nowhere." Meir Schnitzer wrote in Maariv that it is "a great cinematic creation... an artistic miracle." Shmulik Duvdevani on Ynet remarked, "Rarely does a film come out of nowhere, without prior warning, leaving you astonished and awestruck."

The film received four Ophir Award nominations at the 2007 Ophir Awards ceremony, including Best Feature Film for Eyal Shiray, Best Leading Actor for Assi Dayan, Best Original Screenplay for David Volach, and Best Cinematography for Boaz Yehonatan Yaakov.

In addition to these nominations, the film won several prestigious awards. David Volach was awarded Best Director and Boaz Yehonatan Yaakov received Best Cinematography at the Ophir Awards. Volach also won the Best Director award at the Taormina Film Festival. At the Haifa International Film Festival, the film earned accolades for Best Direction (Volach) and Best Cinematography (Yaakov). Lastly, it secured the award for Best Feature Film at the Tribeca Film Festival.

In February 2008, a DVD version of the film was released, featuring a 25-minute conversation between Volach and the film's producer, Eyal Shiray, discussing the film's themes, its biographical connections to Volach, and its unique cinematic style.

== Cast ==
- Assi Dayan – Rabbi Abraham Eidelmann
- Ilan Griff - Menahem Eidelmann
- Sharon HaCohen - Esther Eidelmann

== Gallery ==
Places that appear in the movie :

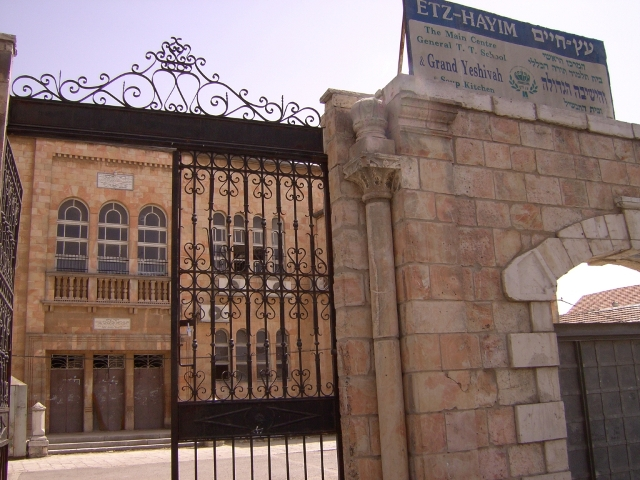
The school of Menachem

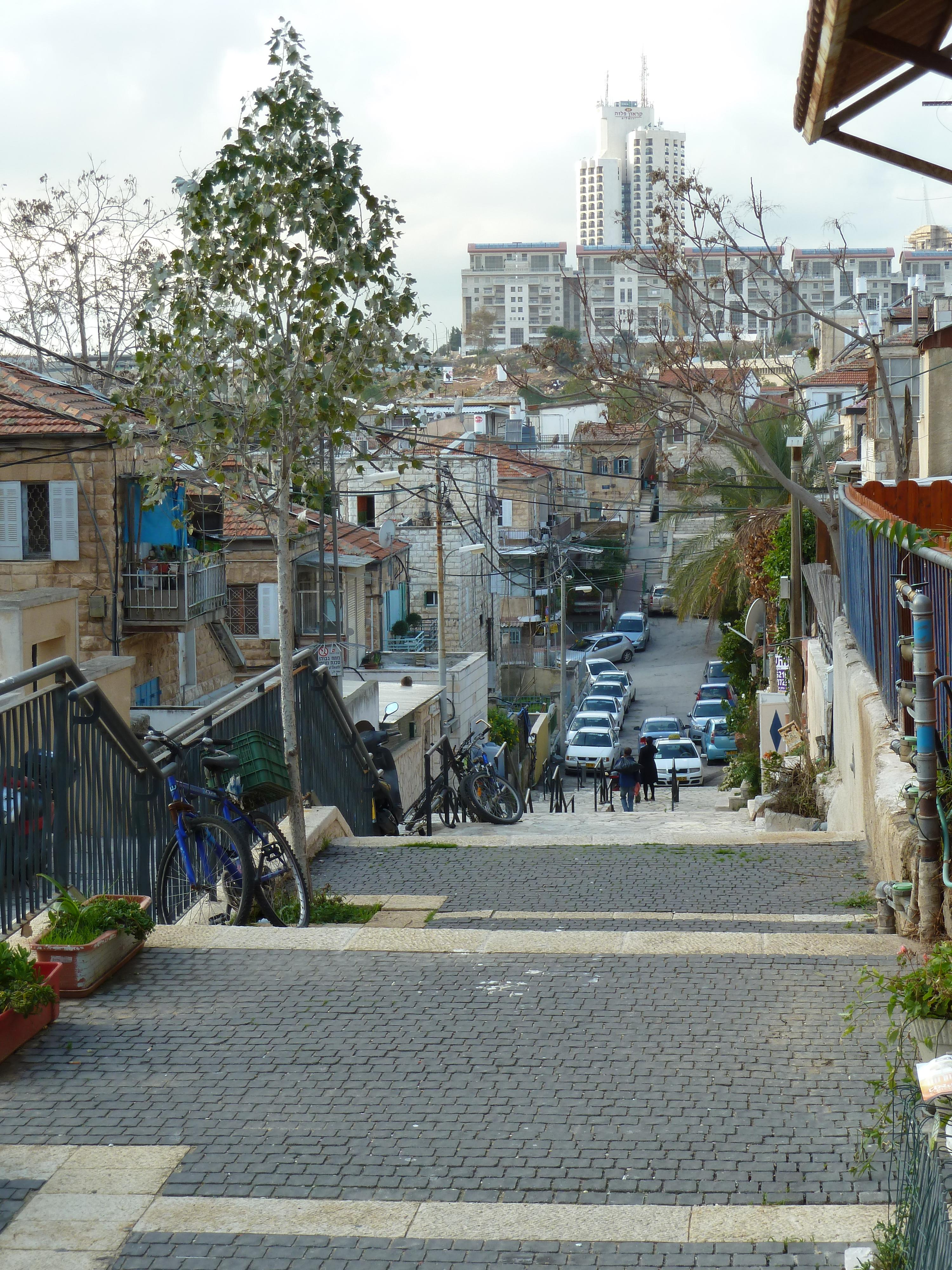
Stairs street

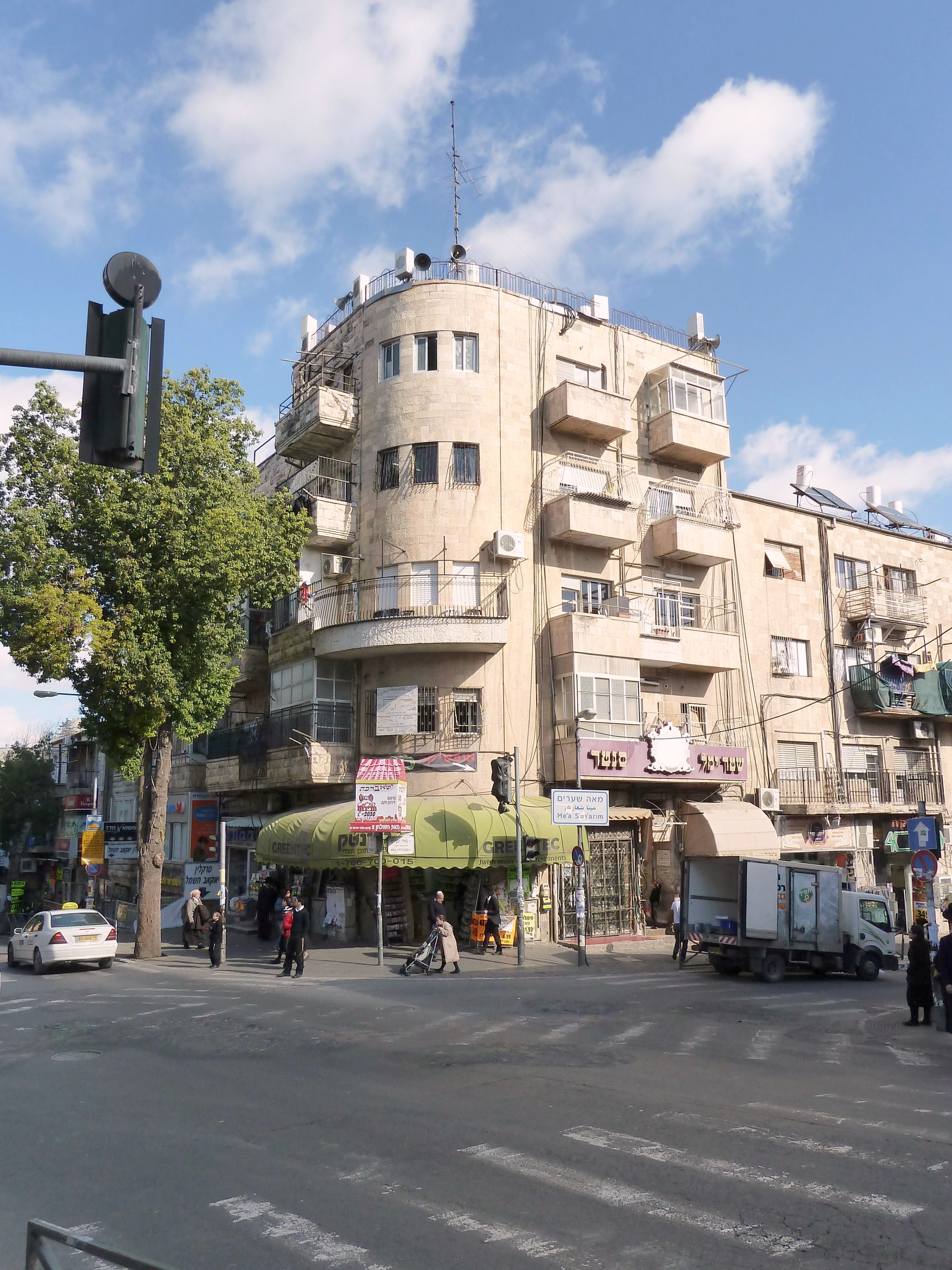
Shabbat Square
