= John Loike =

Dr. John D. Loike
- Born: Stockholm, Sweden
- Education: Yeshiva University, Albert Einstein College of Medicine
- Spouse: Marian Stoltz-Loike
- Scientific career
- Workplaces: Touro University, Columbia University (Adjunct)

John Loike (born 1950 in Stockholm, Sweden) is an American research biologist and bioethicist at Touro University.

== Biography ==
Loike has a Ph.D from the Albert Einstein College of Medicine of Yeshiva University. His research focuses on the role of inflammation in cancer and neurodegenerative diseases. He has published many articles in leading scientific journals including Science, Nature, Journal of Experimental Medicine, Journal of Cell Biology, New England Journal of Medicine, Lancet, PNAS, PlosOne, Journal of Biological Chemistry and The Scientist. In addition he has authored or co-authored several books.

He is the Director for Special Programs for the Center for Bioethics in Columbia University and is a faculty member of the Department of Physiology and Cellular Biophysics at Columbia University College of Physicians and Surgeons. He is also the founder and faculty editor of the Columbia University Journal of Bioethics.

Loike has published many ground-breaking articles on bioethics and specifically deals with bioethics from a Jewish perspective, for which he often teamed with Rabbi Dr. Moshe David Tendler during the latter's lifetime. His articles have dealt with such issues as stem cells, cloning, neuroethics, bioterrorism, and the interface of science and religion. Many of these issues are hotly debated around the world, and specifically in Israel, where religious leaders have a big influence in public policy. Loike has weighed in on these issues in Israeli forums, leading to policy changes there. Serving on a Rabbinical Council of America panel on stem cell research, Loike highlighted scientific innovations that could allow for additional research, while alleviating the ethical questions posed by the scientific use of embryonic stem cells.

== Publications ==
=== Passover medications ===
In 1982, Loike and his longtime study partner, David Hurwitz, published a first-of-its-kind guide to Passover medications. Up until that point, no one had produced a scientific study of leaven ingredients in medications and as a result, many religious Jews had to decide on their own whether their medication could be consumed during Passover according to Jewish Law. Loike and Hurwitz painstakingly contacted various drug manufacturers to ascertain the status of their various medications. This led to a yearly publication of passover medications.

=== Books ===
- Loike, John D.; Ayres, David C. (2008). Lignans: Chemical, Biological and Clinical Properties (Chemistry and Pharmacology of Natural Products). Cambridge University Press. ISBN 978-0521065436.
- Loike, John D.; Fischbach, Ruth L. (2012). Frontiers in Bioethics.
- Loike, John D.; Fischbach, Ruth L. (2015). Science-based Bioethics (4 ed.). Lulu Press, Incorporated. ISBN 9781329799547.
- Loike, John D.; Fischbach, Ruth L. (2022). Science Based Bioethics: A Scientific Approach to Bioethical Decision Making. Shikey Press. ISBN 9781958542040.
