= Marian Stoltz-Loike =

American Professor of Psychology

Marian Stoltz-Loike is an American professor of psychology and human resources development who currently serves as the dean of Lander College for Women and as Vice President of Touro College in charge of online education. She has served several roles as a leader in the American Orthodox Jewish community, and is an associate vice president of the Orthodox Union, one of the first women to hold this role. She is a contributor for U.S. News & World Report.

== Biography ==
Stolz-Loike was born in New York. She attended Harvard University for her undergraduate degree and earned her MA and Ph.D from New York University. She is married to Columbia University professor John Loike.

Stoltz-Loike worked as a human resources consultant with Fortune 100 companies and has helped organizations addresses issues of work-life balance, diversity, generational diversity and cross-cultural differences in the workplace. She has also developed e-learning material to enable older adults to learn Microsoft PowerPoint and Excel.

She has written two books and over fifty articles relating to the maturing workforce, diversity, cross-cultural management, and work/life issues. She has also written on generational issues and the impact of technology in the workplace, work-life balance, women’s career issues, building effective global business strategies, and managing global teams.

== Touro College ==
Dr. Marian Stoltz-Loike is the vice president for online education at Touro College and the dean of Lander College for Women. In the role of dean she introduced an honors program and raised the college's admissions standards. During her tenure the student body has grown considerably. Her proposal regarding the rubric she developed to evaluate online courses was recognized for excellence by the Online Learning Consortium.

== Jewish leadership ==
Dr. Stoltz-Loike is an associate vice president of the Orthodox Union and a member of the board of directors of the Jewish Community Relations Council. She often speaks about women leaders in the Orthodox Jewish world, and is a member of an Orthodox Union working group dealing with the role of women leaders in Jewish life. Stoltz-Loike has also served as a member of the board of governors of the American Jewish Committee and is on the board of directors of the Jewish Community Relations Council.
