= Kosher animals =

Animals that comply with Jewish regulations for consumption

Kosher animals are animals that comply with the regulations of kashrut and are considered kosher foods. These dietary laws ultimately derive from various passages in the Torah with various modifications, additions and clarifications added to these rules by halakha. Various other animal-related rules are contained in the 613 commandments.

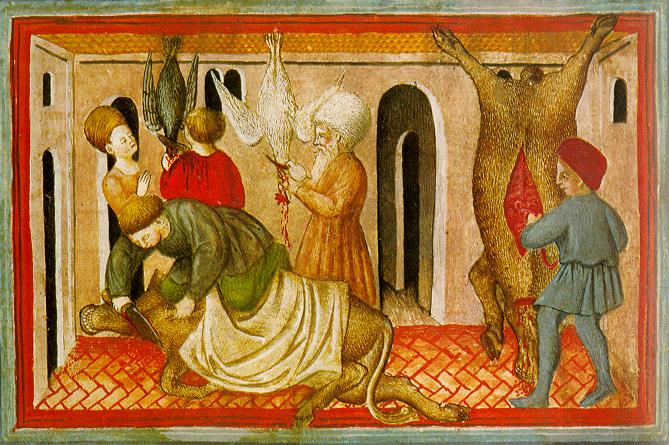
A 15th-century depiction of shechita

== Land animals ==
Cow

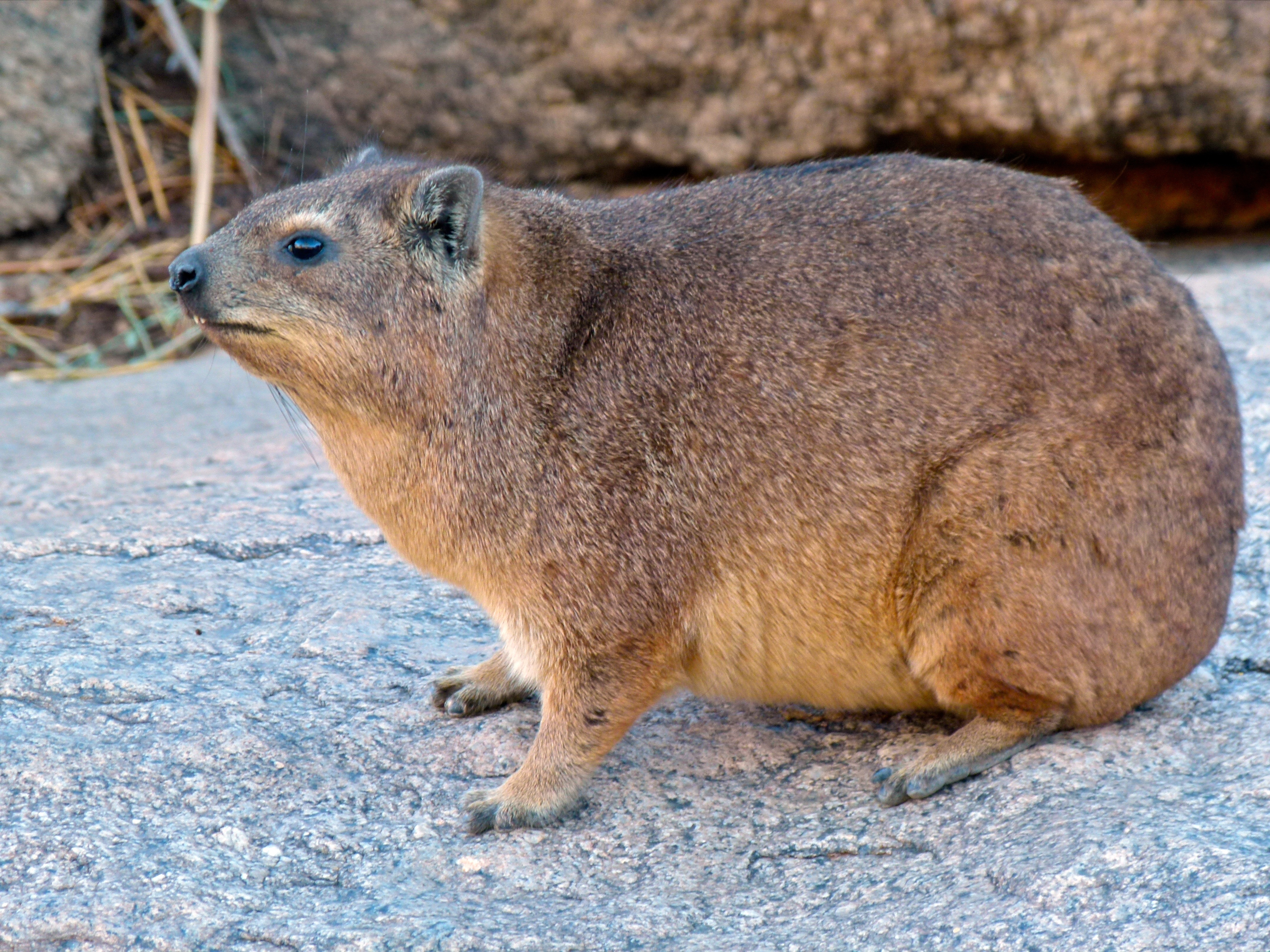
Rock hyrax

Leviticus 11:3–8 and Deuteronomy 14:4–8 both give the same general set of rules for identifying which land animals (Hebrew: בהמות Behemoth) are ritually clean. According to these, any animal which "chews the cud" (e.g., consumes vegetation and later regurgitates it into the mouth to be re-processed and more efficiently digested) and has a completely split hoof (cloven-foot) is ritually clean, but those which only chew the cud or only have cloven hooves are unclean.

Both documents explicitly list four animals as being ritually impure:

- The camel, for chewing the cud without its hooves being divided.
- The hyrax, for chewing the cud without having cloven hooves; as the hyrax was not known to early English translators, the Hebrew term for this animal, שפן (shapan), has been interpreted in older English versions of the Bible as coney (rabbit, hare), a name with clear connections to words such as the Spanish conejo (rabbit). The actual coney was an exclusively European lagomorph, and not present in Canaan; hyraxes, however, are still found in Southern and Eastern Africa, the Levant and Arabian Peninsula, with the shapan in the Book of Proverbs described as having lived on rocks (likely referring to the rock hyrax, not the coney). Despite their rabbit- or rodent-like appearance, hyraxes are actually one of the closest living relatives of elephants, still possessing "tusk"-like teeth—as opposed to the ever-growing, gnawing teeth of rodents or lagomorphs. Additionally, their feet do not have the small claws and digits of rodents or lagomorphs, instead resembling miniature elephant-feet, with toenails specially adapted for climbing rocks.
- The hare, for chewing the cud without having cloven hooves.
- The pig, for having cloven hooves without chewing the cud.

While camels possess a single stomach, and are thus not true ruminants, they do chew cud; additionally, camels do not have hooves at all, but rather separate toes on individual toe pads, with hoof-like toenails.

Although hares and other lagomorphs (coney, rabbits, pikas) do not ruminate at all, they do typically re-ingest soft cecal pellets made of chewed plant material immediately after excretion for further bacterial digestion in their stomach, which serves the same purpose as rumination. They are also known to ingest their own and the droppings of other lagomorphs for nutritive reasons.

Although not ruminants, hyraxes have complex, multichambered stomachs that allow symbiotic bacteria to break-down tough plant materials, though they do not regurgitate it for re-chewing. Further clarification of this classification has been attempted by various authors, most recently by Rabbi Natan Slifkin, in a book, entitled The Camel, the Hare, and the Hyrax.

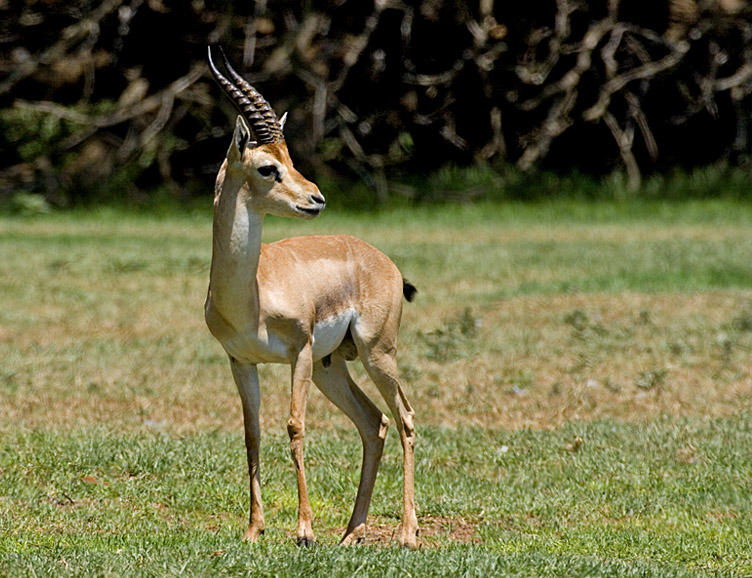
Mountain gazelle

Unlike Leviticus 11:3-8, Deuteronomy 14:4-8 also explicitly names 10 animals considered ritually clean:

- The ox
- The sheep
- The goat
- The deer
- The gazelle
- The yahmur; this term, directly taken from the Masoretic Text, is used in modern Hebrew to refer to the fallow deer, while in Arabic it refers to the roe deer. Scholarship identifications of the biblical animal include, in addition to the fallow deer and roe deer, also the hartebeest, based on the Vulgate, which renders it as bubalum.
- The the'o; this term, directly taken from the Masoretic Text, has traditionally been translated ambiguously.

In Deuteronomy, it has traditionally been translated as wild goat, but in the same translations is called a wild ox where it occurs in Isaiah. In modern Hebrew, the'o (תאו) is used for bubalus, a genus of Asiatic bovines.

- The pygarg; the identity of this animal is uncertain, and pygarg is merely the Septuagint's rendering. The Masoretic Text calls it a dishon, meaning springing; it has thus usually been interpreted as some form of antelope or ibex. Specifically, Amar et al. interpret dishon as Arabian oryx.
- The antelope
- The camelopardalis; the identity of this animal is uncertain, and "camelopardalis" is merely the Septuagint's wording. The Masoretic Text calls it a zamer, but camelopardalis means camel-leopard and typically refers to the giraffe (giraffe is derived, via Italian, from the Arabic term ziraafa, meaning "assembled [from multiple parts]"); in taxonomy, several types of giraffes are placed under Giraffa camelopardalis. The traditional translation has been for the chamois, an alpine goat-antelope of Europe and parts of Asia Minor, but it has never naturally existed in Canaan; neither is the giraffe naturally found in Canaan (though it was likely known from Northern Africa). Consequently, the wild sheep ancestor, the mouflon, is considered the best remaining identification, despite not being related to the term "camel-leopard".

The Deuteronomic passages mention no further land beasts as being clean or unclean, seemingly suggesting that the status of the remaining land beasts can be extrapolated from the given rules.

By contrast, the Levitical rules later go on to add that all quadrupeds with paws should be considered ritually unclean, something not explicitly stated by the Deuteronomic passages.

The Leviticus passages thus cover all the large land animals that naturally live in Canaan, except for primates, and equids (horses, zebras, etc.), which are not mentioned in Leviticus as being either ritually clean or unclean, despite their importance in warfare and society, and their mention elsewhere in Leviticus.

In an attempt to help identify animals of ambiguous appearance, the Talmud, in a similar manner to Aristotle's earlier Historia Animalium, argued that animals without upper teeth would always chew the cud and have split hoofs (thus being ritually clean), and that no animal with upper teeth would do so; the Talmud makes an exception for the case of the camel (which, like the other ruminant even-toed ungulates, is apparently 'without upper teeth' though some citations), even though the skulls clearly have both front and rear upper teeth. The Talmud also argues that the meat from the legs of clean animals can be torn lengthwise as well as across, unlike that of unclean animals, thus aiding to identify the status of meat from uncertain origin.

=== Origin ===
Many Biblical scholars believe that the classification of animals was created to explain pre-existing taboos. Beginning with Saadia Gaon, several Jewish commentators started to explain these taboos rationalistically; Saadia himself expresses an argument similar to that of totemism, that the unclean animals were declared so because they were worshipped by other cultures. Due to comparatively recent discoveries about the cultures adjacent to the Israelites, it has become possible to investigate whether such principles could underlie some of the food laws.

Egyptian priests would only eat the meat of even-toed ungulates (swine, camelids, and ruminants), and rhinoceros. Like the Egyptian priests, Vedic India (and presumably the Persians also) allowed the meat of rhinoceros and certain ruminants, although cattle were likely excluded as they were seemingly taboo in Vedic India; in a particular parallel with the Israelite list, Vedic India explicitly forbade the consumption of camelids and domestic pigs (but not wild boar). However, unlike the biblical rules, Vedic India did allow the consumption of hare and porcupine, but Harran did not, and was even more similar to the Israelite regulations, allowing all ruminants (but not other land beasts) and expressly forbidding the meat of camels.

It is also possible to find an ecological explanation for these rules. If one believes that religious customs are at least partly explained by the ecological conditions in which a religion evolves, then this too could account for the origin of these rules.

=== Modern practices ===
In addition to meeting the restrictions as defined by the Torah, there is also the issue of masorah (tradition). In general, animals are eaten only if there is a masorah that has been passed down from generations ago that clearly indicates that these animals are acceptable. For instance, there was considerable debate as to the kosher status of zebu and bison among the rabbinical authorities when they first became known and available for consumption; the Orthodox Union permits bison, as can be attested to by the menus of some of the more upscale kosher restaurants in New York City.

== Water creatures ==
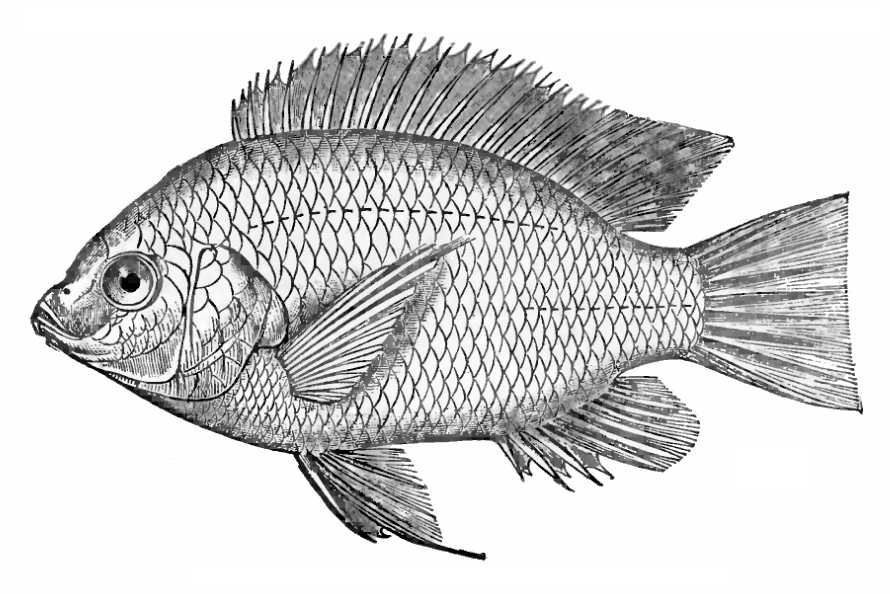
Nile tilapia, Oreochromis niloticus, kosher fish

Leviticus 11:9–12 and Deuteronomy 14:9–10 both state that anything residing in "the waters" (which Leviticus specifies as being the seas and rivers) is ritually clean if it has both fins and scales, in contrast to anything residing in the waters with neither fins nor scales. The latter class of animals is described as ritually impure by Deuteronomy, Leviticus describes them as an "abomination" KJV Leviticus 11:10. Abomination is also sometimes used to translate iggul and toebah.

Although the Tanakh does not further specify, the Talmud makes the claim that all fish that have scales also have fins, and so practically speaking, we need to only identify organisms that have scales and can ignore the portion of the rule about fins. Nachmanides comments that the scales of a kosher fish must be able to be removed either by hand or by knife, but that the underlying skin does not become damaged with removal of the scales, and this opinion had been universally accepted by all halachic authorities at the time.

The definition of "scale" differs from the definitions presented in biology, in that the scales of a kosher fish must be visible to the eye, present in the adult form, and can be easily removed from the skin either by hand or scaling knife. Thus, a grass carp, mirror carp, and salmon are kosher, whereas a shark, whose "scales" are microscopic dermal denticles, a sturgeon, whose scutes cannot be easily removed without cutting them out of the body, and a swordfish, which loses all of its scales as an adult, are all not kosher.

Scientifically, there are five different types of fish scales: placoid, cosmoid, ganoid, ctenoid and cycloid. The majority of kosher fish exhibit the latter two forms, ctenoid or cycloid, but the bowfin (Amia calva) is an example of a fish with ganoid scales that is deemed kosher. As such, kosher status cannot be said to follow the rules of modern-day classification, and qualified experts on kosher fish must be consulted to determine the status of a particular fish or scale type.

These rules restrict permissible seafood to stereotypical fish, prohibiting the unusual forms such as the eel, lamprey, hagfish, and lancelet. In addition, they exclude non-fish marine creatures, such as crustaceans (lobster, crab, prawn, shrimp, barnacle, etc.), molluscs (squid, octopus, oyster, periwinkle, etc.), sea cucumbers, and jellyfish.

Other creatures living in the sea and rivers that would be prohibited by the rules include the cetaceans (dolphin, whale, etc.), crocodilians (alligator, crocodile etc.), sea turtles, sea snakes, and all amphibians.

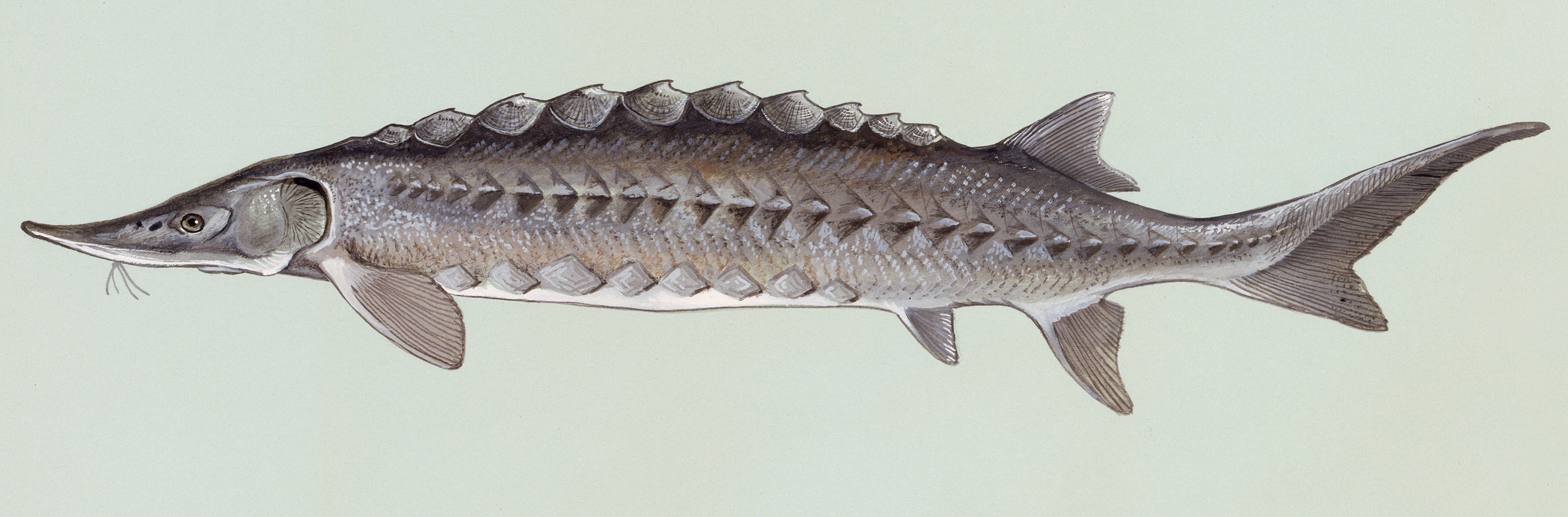
An oxyrhynchus sturgeon

Sharks are considered to be ritually unclean according to these regulations, as their scales can only be removed by damaging the skin. A minor controversy arises from the fact that the appearance of the scales of swordfish is heavily affected by the ageing process—their young satisfy Nachmanides' rule, but when they reach adulthood they do not.

Traditionally "fins" has been interpreted as referring to translucent fins. The Mishnah claims that all fish with scales will also have fins, but that the reverse is not always true. For the latter case, the Talmud argues that ritually clean fish have a distinct spinal column and flattish face, while ritually unclean fish lack spinal columns and have pointy heads, which would define the shark and sturgeon (and related fish) as ritually unclean.

Nevertheless, Aaron Chorin, a prominent 19th-century rabbi and reformer, declared that the sturgeon was actually ritually pure, and hence permissible to eat. Many Conservative rabbis now view these particular fish as being kosher, but most Orthodox rabbis do not.

The question for sturgeon is particularly significant as most caviar consists of sturgeon eggs, and therefore cannot be kosher if the sturgeon itself is not. Sturgeon-derived caviar is not eaten by some Kosher-observant Jews because sturgeon possess ganoid scales instead of the usual ctenoid and cycloid scales. A vegetarian caviar substitute made from kelp has received kosher certification. Atlantic salmon roe is also kosher.

When a kosher fish is removed from the water, it is considered "slaughtered", and it is unnecessary to ritually kill it in the manner of kosher livestock. Nonetheless, kosher law explicitly forbids the consumption of a fish while it is still alive.

=== Origin ===
Nachmanides believed that the restrictions against certain fish also addressed health concerns, arguing that fish with fins and scales (and hence ritually clean) typically live in shallower waters than those without fins or scales (i.e., those that were ritually impure), and consequently the latter were much colder and more humid, qualities he believed made their flesh toxic.

The academic perception is that natural repugnance from "weird-looking" fish is a significant factor in the origin of the restrictions. Vedic India (and presumably the Persians also) exhibit such repugnance, generally allowing fish, but forbidding "weird looking" fish and exclusively carnivorous fish; in Egypt, another significant and influential culture near to the Israelites, the priests avoided all fish completely.

=== Fish with dairy ===
Although Joseph Karo of Safed, in his 16th-century legal commentary the Beit Yosef, considers eating milk and fish together to be a health risk, Karo does not mention a prohibition of eating dairy and fish together in the Shulchan Aruch.

Most rabbinic authorities from that time onwards, including almost all Ashkenazi ones, have ruled that this was a scribal error, and there is neither Talmudic basis nor any other rabbinical precedent for prohibiting milk and fish, and thus permit such mixtures. Indeed, two passages in the Babylonian Talmud implicitly state that it is entirely permissible.

Nevertheless, since Karo and other rabbis wrote that milk and fish should not be mixed, there are some Jewish communities whose practice is not to mix them. The Chabad custom is not to eat fish together with actual milk, but to permit it where other dairy products are involved, so that adding a touch of butter or cream to the milk is sufficient to permit mixing it with fish.

== Birds ==
With regard to birds, no general rule is given, instead Leviticus 11:13–19 and Deuteronomy 14:11–18 explicitly list prohibited birds. In the Shulchan Aruch, 3 signs are given to kosher birds: the presence of a crop, an extra finger, and a gizzard that can be peeled. The bird must also not be a bird of prey. The Masoretic Text lists the birds as:

- nesher—"that which sheds its feathers"
- peres—"bone breaker"
- ozniyah—feminine form of oz, meaning "strong"
- ra'ah/da'ah—that which darts, in the sense of "rapid"
- ayyah
- orev
- bat yaanah—daughter of howling
- tahmas—one who scratches the face
- shahaf—one which atrophies
- netz
- kos—"cup"
- shalak—"plunger"
- yanshuf—"twilight"
- tinshemet—"blower"/"breather"
- qa'at—"vomiting"
- racham—"tenderness"/"affection"
- hasidah—"devoted"
- anafah—"one which sniffs sharply", in the sense of 'anger'
- dukifat
- atalef

The list in Deuteronomy has an additional bird, the dayyah, which seems to be a combination of 'da'ah' and 'ayyah', and may be a scribal error; the Talmud regards it as a duplication of ayyah. This, and the other terms, are vague and difficult to translate, but there are a few further descriptions, of some of these birds, elsewhere in the Bible:

- The ayyah is mentioned again in the Book of Job, where it is used to describe a bird distinguished by its particularly good sight.
- The bat yaanah is described by the Book of Isaiah as living in desolate places, and the Book of Micah states that it emits a mournful cry.
- The qa'at appears in the Book of Zephaniah, where it is portrayed as nesting on the columns of a ruined city; the Book of Isaiah identifies it as possessing a marshy and desolate kingdom.

The Septuagint versions of the lists are more helpful, as in almost all cases the bird is clearly identifiable:

- aeton—eagle
- grypa—ossifrage
- haliaetos—sea eagle
- gyps—vulture
- ictinia—kite
- corax—raven
- stouthios—ostrich
- glaux—owl
- laros—gull
- hierax—hawk
- nycticorax—night raven
- cataractes—cormorant
- porphyrion--swamphen, coot
- cycnos—swan
- Ibis
- Pelican
- charadrios—plover
- herodios—heron
- epops—hoopoe
- nycturia—bat
- meleagris—guineafowl

Although the first 10 birds identified by the Septuagint seem to fit the descriptions of the Masoretic Text, the ossifrage (Latin for "bone breaker") being a good example, the correspondence is less clear for most of the remaining birds.

It is also obvious that the list in Leviticus, or the list in Deuteronomy, or both, are in a different order in the Septuagint, compared to the Masoretic Text. (Note: In the Masoretic Text, the lists are nearly the same between Leviticus and Deuteronomy, but in the Septuagint Leviticus is clearly in a different order to Deuteronomy)

Attempting to determine the correspondence is problematic; for example, "pelican" may correspond to qa'at ("vomiting"), in reference to the pelican's characteristic behaviour, but it may also correspond to kos ("cup"), as a reference to the pelican's jaw pouch.

An additional complexity arises from the fact that the porphyrion has not yet been identified, and classical Greek literature merely identifies a number of species that are not the porphyrion, including the peacock, grouse, and robin, and implies that the porphyrion is the cousin of the kingfisher. From these meager clarifications, the porphyrion can only be identified as anything from the lilac-breasted roller, Indian roller, or northern carmine bee-eater, to the flamingo. A likely candidate is the purple swamphen.

During the Middle Ages, classical descriptions of the hoopoe were mistaken for descriptions of the lapwing, on account of the lapwing's prominent crest, and the hoopoe's rarity in England, resulting in "lapwing" being listed in certain bible translations instead of "hoopoe".

Similarly, the sea eagle has historically been confused with the osprey, and translations have often used the latter bird in place of the former. Because strouthos (ostrich) was also used in Greek for the sparrow, a few translations have placed the sparrow among the list.

In Arabic, the Egyptian vulture is often referred to as rachami, and therefore a number of translations render 'racham' as "gier eagle", the old name for the Egyptian vulture.

Variations arise when translations follow other ancient versions of the Bible, rather than the Septuagint, where they differ. Rather than vulture (gyps), the Vulgate has "milvus", meaning "red kite", which historically has been called the "glede", on account of its gliding flight; similarly, the Syriac Peshitta has "owl" rather than "ibis".

Other variations arise from attempting to base translations primarily on the Masoretic Text; these translations generally interpret some of the more ambiguous birds as being various different kinds of vulture and owl. All of these variations mean that most translations arrive at a list of 20 birds from among the following:

- Bat
- Black kite
- Black vulture
- Cormorant
- Cuckoo
- Desert owl
- Eagle
- Eagle owl
- Egyptian vulture
- Falcon
- Flamingo
- Glede
- Great owl
- Gull
- Hawk
- Heron
- Hoopoe
- Ibis
- Indian roller
- Kingfisher
- Kite
- Lapwing
- Lilac-breasted roller
- Little owl
- Nighthawk
- Night raven
- Northern carmine bee-eater
- Osprey
- Ossifrage
- Ostrich
- Owl
- Peacock
- Pelican
- Plover
- Porphyrion (untranslated)
- Raven
- Red Kite
- Screech owl
- Sea eagle
- Sparrow
- Stork
- Swan
- Vulture
- White owl

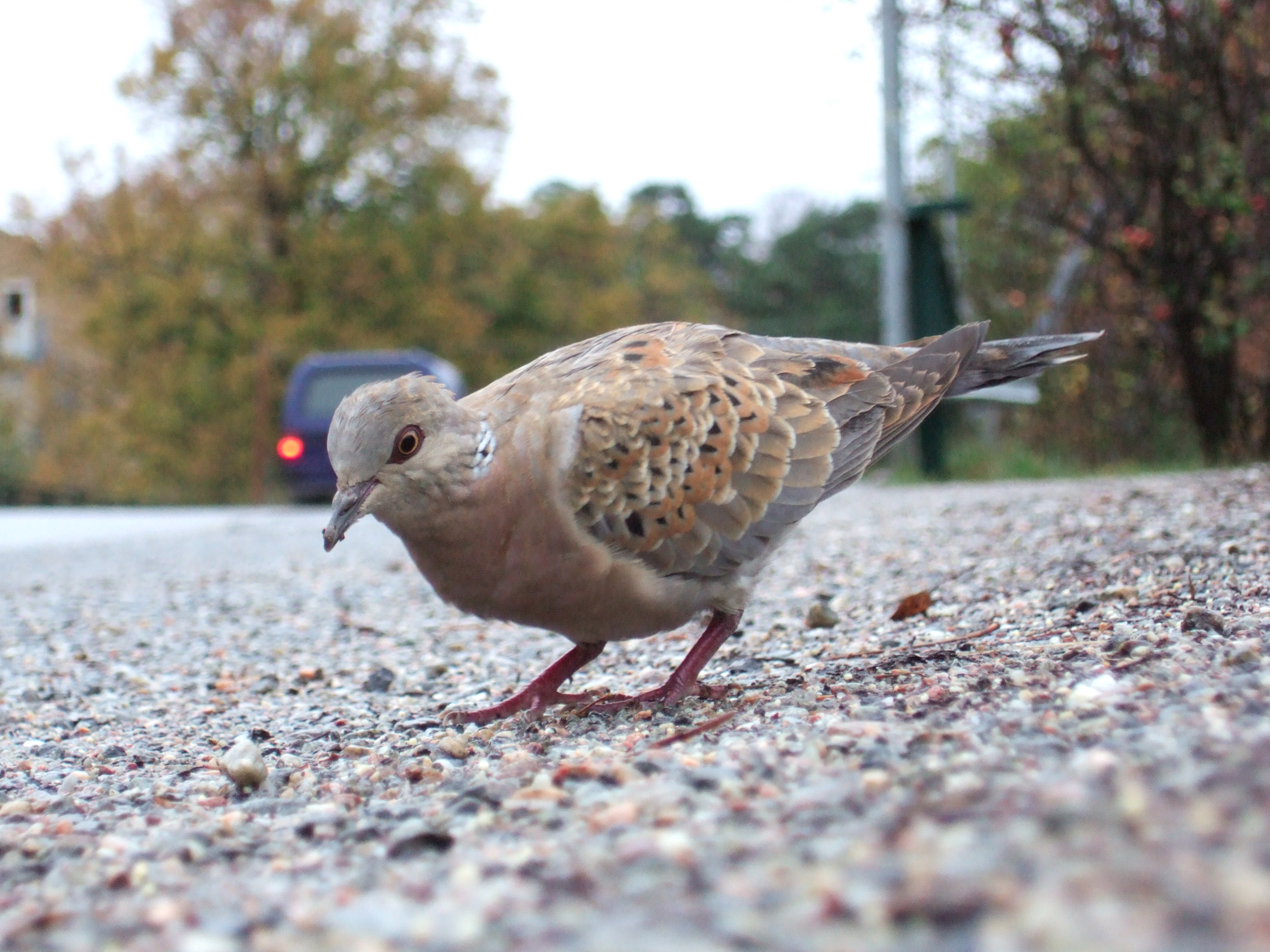
Turtle dove

Despite being listed among the birds by the Bible, bats are not birds, and are in fact mammals (because the Hebrew Bible distinguishes animals into four general categories—beasts of the land, flying animals, creatures which crawl upon the ground, and animals which dwell in water—not according to modern scientific classification).

Most of the remaining animals on the list are either birds of prey or birds living on water, and the majority of the latter in the list also eat fish or other seafood.

The Septuagint's version of the list comprehensively lists most of the birds of Canaan that fall into these categories. The conclusion of modern scholars is that, generally, ritually unclean birds were those clearly observed to eat other animals.

Although it does regard all birds of prey as being forbidden, the Talmud is uncertain of there being a general rule, and instead gives detailed descriptions of the features that distinguish a bird as being ritually clean.

The Talmud argues that clean birds would have craws, an easily separated 'double-skin', and would eat food by placing it on the ground (rather than holding it on the ground) and tearing it with their bills before eating it; however, the Talmud also argues that only the birds in the biblical list are actually forbidden—these distinguishing features were only for cases when there was any uncertainty in the bird's identity.

=== Origin ===
The earliest rationalistic explanations of the laws against eating certain birds focused on symbolic interpretations. The first indication of this view can be found in the 1st century BC Letter of Aristeas, which argues that this prohibition is a lesson to teach justice, and is also about not injuring others.

Such allegorical explanations were abandoned by most Jewish and Christian theologians after a few centuries, and later writers instead sought to find medical explanations for the rules; Nachmanides, for example, claimed that the black and thickened blood of birds of prey would cause psychological damage, making people much more inclined to cruelty.

However, other cultures treated the meat of certain carnivorous birds as having medical benefits, the Romans viewing owl meat as being able to ease the pain of insect bites.

Conversely, modern scientific studies have discovered very toxic birds such as the pitohui, which are neither birds of prey nor water birds, and therefore the biblical regulations allow them to be eaten.

Laws against eating any carnivorous birds also existed in Vedic India and Harran, and the Egyptian priests also refused to eat carnivorous birds.

=== Modern practical considerations ===
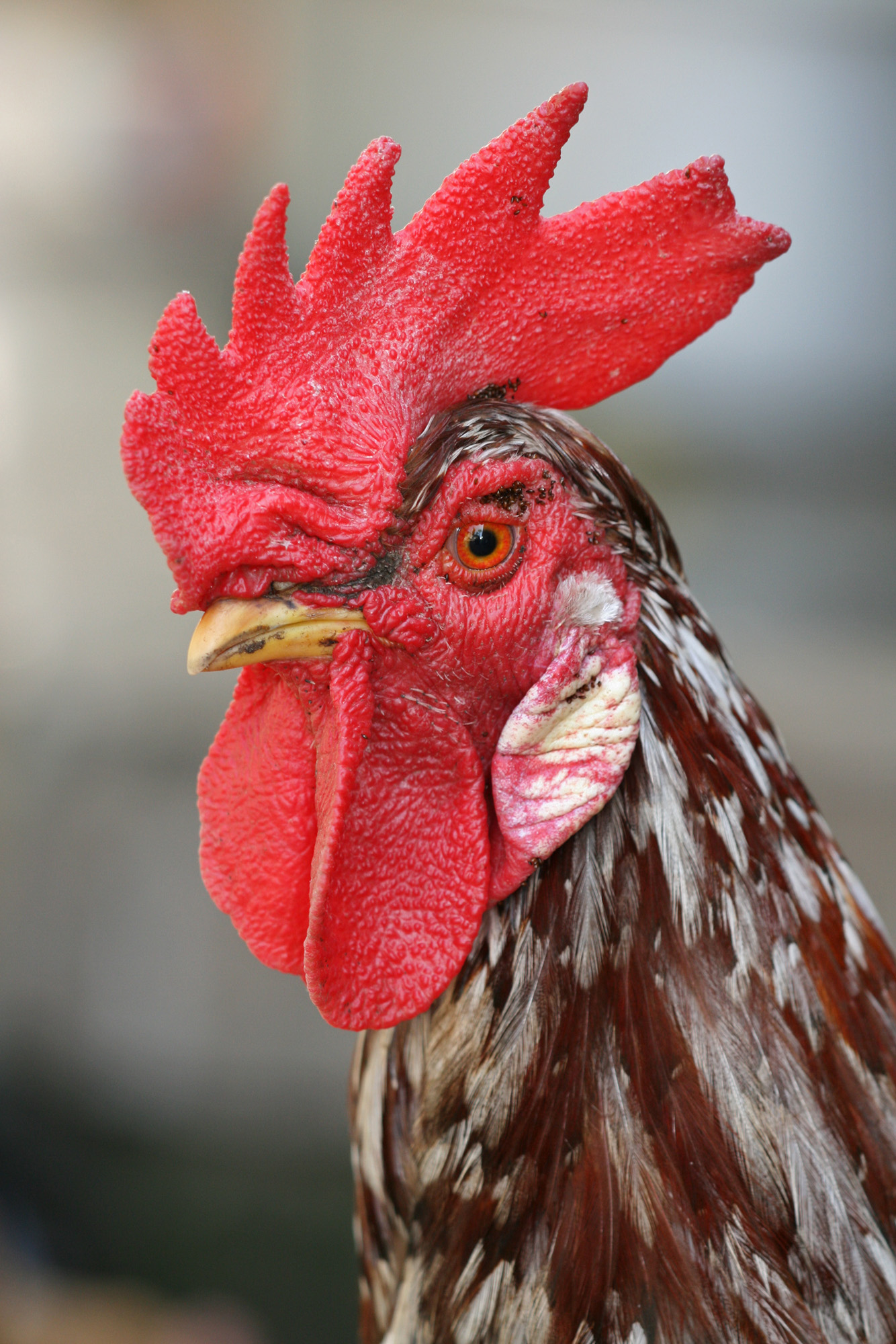
Rooster

Due to the difficulty of identification, religious authorities have restricted consumption to specific birds for which Jews have passed down a tradition of permissibility from generation to generation. Birds for which there has been a tradition of their being kosher include:

- Chicken
- Chukar partridge
- Common pheasant
- Common quail
- Grey partridge
- House sparrow
- Rock partridge
- Japanese quail
- Rock dove
- Turtle dove

As a general principle, scavenging birds such as vultures and birds of prey such as hawks and eagles (which opportunistically eat carrion) are unclean.

The turkey does not have a tradition, but because so many Orthodox Jews have come to eat it and it possesses the simanim (signs) required to render it a kosher bird, an exception is made, but with all other birds a masorah is required.

Songbirds, which are consumed as delicacies in many societies, may be kosher in theory, but are not eaten in kosher homes as there is no tradition of them being eaten as such. Pigeons and doves are known to be kosher based on their permissible status as sacrificial offerings in the Temple of Jerusalem.

The Orthodox Union of America considers neither the peafowl nor the guineafowl to be kosher birds since it has not obtained testimony from experts about the permissibility of either of these birds. In the case of the swans, there is no clear tradition of eating them.

Rabbi Chaim Loike is currently the Orthodox Union's specialist on kosher bird species.

=== Predator birds ===
Unlike with land creatures and fish, the Torah does not give signs for determining kosher birds, and instead gives a list of non-kosher birds.

The Talmud also offers signs for determining whether a bird is kosher or not.

If a bird kills other animals to get its food, eats meat, or is a dangerous bird, then it is not kosher, a predatory bird is unfit to eat, raptors like the eagles, hawks, owls and other hunting birds are not kosher, vultures and other carrion-eating birds are not kosher either.

Crows and members of the crow family such as jackdaws, magpies and ravens are not kosher. Storks, kingfishers, penguins and other fish-eating birds are not kosher.

== Flying insects ==
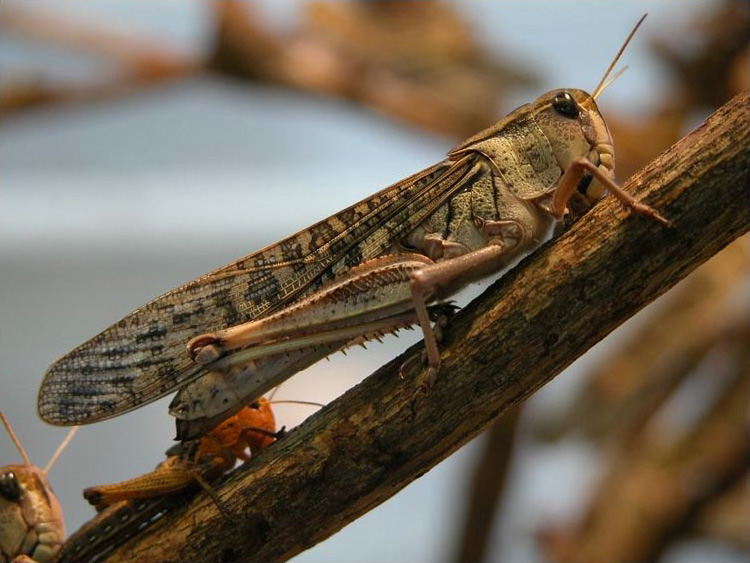
The migratory locust

Deuteronomy 14:19 specifies that all "flying creeping things" were to be considered ritually unclean and Leviticus 11:20 goes further, describing all flying creeping things as filth, Hebrew sheqets. Leviticus goes on to list four exceptions, which Deuteronomy does not.

All these exceptions are described by the Levitical passages as "going upon all four legs" and as having "legs above their feet" for the purpose of leaping. The identity of the four creatures the Levitical rules list are named in the Masoretic Text using words of uncertain meaning:

- arbeh—the Hebrew word literally means "[one which] increases". The Septuagint calls it a brouchos, referring to a wingless locust, and older English translations render this as grasshopper in most parts of the Bible, but inconsistently translate it as locust in Leviticus.

In the Book of Nahum, the arbeh is poetically described as camping in hedges in cold days, but flying off into the far distance when the sun arises; for this reason, a number of scholars have suggested that the arbeh must actually be the migratory locust.

- sol'am—the Hebrew term literally means "swallower". The Septuagint calls it an attacos, the meaning of which is currently uncertain. The Talmud describes it as having a long head that is bald in front, for which reason a number of English translations call it a bald locust (an ambiguous term); many modern scholars believe that the Acrida (previously called Tryxalis) is meant, as it is distinguished by its very elongated head.
- hargol—the Hebrew term literally means strafer (one that runs to the right or to the left). The Septuagint calls it an ophiomachos, literally meaning "snake fighter"; the Talmud describes it as having a tail. The Talmud also states that it has large eggs, which were turned into amulets. This has historically been translated as beetle, but since the 19th century, cricket has been deemed more likely to fit.
- hagab—the word literally means "hider". The Book of Numbers implies that they were particularly small. The Septuagint calls it an akrida, and it has usually been translated as grasshopper.

The Mishnah argues that the ritually clean locusts could be distinguished as they would all have four feet, jumping with two of them, and have four wings which are of sufficient size to cover the entire locust's body. The Mishnah also goes on to state that any species of locust could only be considered as clean if there was a reliable tradition that it was so.

The only Jewish group that continue to preserve such a tradition are the Jews of Yemen, who use the term "kosher locust" to describe the specific species of locusts they believe to be kosher, all of which are native to the Arabian Peninsula.

Due to the difficulties in establishing the validity of such traditions, later rabbinical authorities forbade contact with all types of locust to ensure that the ritually unclean locusts were avoided.

== Small land creatures ==
Leviticus 11:42–43 specifies that whatever "goes on its belly, and whatever goes on all fours, or whatever has many feet, any swarming thing that swarms on the ground, you shall not eat, for they are detestable." (Hebrew: sheqets). Before stating this, it singles out eight particular "creeping things" as specifically being ritually unclean in Leviticus 11:29–30.

Like many of the other biblical lists of animals, the exact identity of the creatures in the list is uncertain; medieval philosopher and Rabbi Saadia Gaon, for example, gives a somewhat different explanation for each of the eight "creeping things." The Masoretic Text names them as follows:

- holed—the Talmud describes it as a predatory animal that bores underground.
- akhbar, refers to the jerboa
- tzab—the Talmud describes it as being similar to a salamander
- anaqah—this Hebrew term literally means "groaner", and consequently a number of scholars believe it refers to a gecko, which makes a distinctive croaking sound.
- ko'ah
- leta'ah—the Talmud describes it as being paralyzed by heat but revived with water, and states that its tail moves when cut off
- homet
- tinshemet—this term literally means "blower/breather", and also appears in the list of birds

The Septuagint version of the list does not appear to directly parallel the Masoretic, and is thought to be listed in a different order. It lists the eight as:

- galei—a general term including the weasel, ferret, and the stoat, all of which are predatory animals noticeably attracted to holes in the ground.
- mus—the mouse.
- krokodelos-chersaios—the "land crocodile", which is thought to refer to the monitor lizard, a large lizard of somewhat crocodilian appearance.
- mygale—the shrew.
- chamaileon—the chameleon, which puffs itself up and opens its mouth wide when threatened
- chalabotes—a term derived from chala meaning "rock/claw", and therefore probably the wall lizard
- saura—the lizard in general, possibly here intended to be the skink, since it is the other remaining major group of lizards.
- aspalax—the mole-rat, although some older English translations, not being aware of the mole-rat's existence, have instead translated this as mole.
- The earthworm, the snake, the scorpion, the beetle, the centipede, and all the creatures that crawl on the ground are not kosher.
- Worms, snails and most invertebrate animals are not kosher.
- All reptiles, all amphibians and insects with the exception of four types of locust are not kosher.

== Children's Literature ==
The dietary laws surrounding kosher animals have been featured in modern children's literature to introduce concepts of kashrut through story and humor:

- Laurel Snyder's picture book Baxter, the Pig Who Wanted to Be Kosher (2010) explores dietary boundaries through a character who hopes to attend a Shabbat meal.
- Amir Dori's comedic guide Is It Kosher? A Kid’s Guide to Kosher Animals and Jewish Food Rules (2026) uses humor and illustrations to explain requirements such as split hooves, chewing the cud, and fins and scales.

== See also ==
- Kashrut
- Kosher foods
