= Acharonim =

Jewish leaders living from the 16th century to today

In Jewish law and history, Acharonim (Hebrew: אחרונים, romanized: Aḥaronim, Modern Israeli Hebrew: [ʔaχ(a)ʁoˈnim], Biblical Hebrew: [ʔaħ(a)roˈnim]; lit. 'last ones'; sing. אחרון, Aḥaron) are the leading rabbis and poskim (Jewish legal decisors) living from roughly the 16th century to the present, and more specifically since the writing of the Shulchan Aruch (lit. 'Set Table'; a code of Jewish law) in 1563 CE.

The Acharonim follow the Rishonim, the "first ones"—the rabbinic scholars between the 11th and the 16th century following the Geonim and preceding the Shulchan Aruch. The publication of the Shulchan Aruch thus marks the transition from the era of Rishonim to that of Acharonim.

The Acharonim are thus contemporary with the Early Modern Period, the foundation of Hasidic Judaism, Jewish emancipation in Europe, the Haskalah (Jewish Enlightenment), Zionism, the Holocaust, the foundation of the State of Israel and the Jewish exodus from the Muslim world.

== Consequences for Halakhic change ==
The distinction between the Acharonim, Rishonim and Geonim is meaningful historically. According to the widely held view in Orthodox Judaism, the Acharonim generally cannot dispute the rulings of rabbis of previous eras unless they find support from other rabbis in previous eras. Yet the opposite view exists as well: In The Principles of Jewish Law Orthodox Rabbi Menachem Elon wrote:

[such a view] "inherently violates the precept of Hilkheta Ke-Vatra'ei, that is, the law is according to the later scholars. This rule dates from the Geonic period. It laid down that until the time of Rabbis Abbaye and Rava (4th century) the Halakha was to be decided according to the views of the earlier scholars, but from that time onward, the halakhic opinions of post-talmudic scholars would prevail over the contrary opinions of a previous generation. See Piskei Ha'Rosh, Bava Metzia 3:10, 4:21, Shabbat 23:1

Hilkheta Ke-Vatra'ei can be interpreted such that the Orthodox view does not constitute a contradiction, with an appeal to understand it within the greater context of Torah. While authority may go to the scholars of a later generation within a particular era, the Talmud does not allow scholars of a later era to argue with scholars of an earlier era without support from other scholars of an earlier era.

This is displayed in "hundreds of instances" in the Talmud in which Amora’im are challenged by Tanna’itic sources with the term מיתיבי and the Amorai'm unable to "deflect the challenge". An Amora called Rav is challenged by Tannai’tic sources "and is vindicated by the statement, Rav tanna hu upalig"- "Rav is a Tanna and disagrees (in Eiruvin 50b, Kesubos 8a, and elsewhere). A similar case exists for Rav Chiya, a borderline Tanna in Bava Metzia 5a. This clearly implies that the only reason they are able to get away with disagreeing is because they are Tannaim. There are "only a handful of possible exceptions [to the rule] that the Amora’im did not, in fact argue with the Tanna’im."

The question of which prior rulings can and cannot be disputed has led to attempts to precisely define which rulings are within the Acharonim era. According to many rabbis the Shulkhan Arukh is from an Acharon. Some hold that Rabbi Yosef Karo's Beit Yosef has the halakhic status of a work of a Rishon, while his later Shulkhan Arukh has the status of a work of an Acharon.

== Notable Acharonim ==
Note: This list is incomplete and is only intended to provide a small selection from the broad list of prominent rabbinic figures of the Acharonic era. For a more comprehensive list, see List of rabbis.

=== 16th century ===
- Bezalel Ashkenazi (Shitah Mekubetzet) (c. 1520 – c. 1592), Talmudist
- Moses ben Jacob Cordovero (Ramak) (1522–1570), Holy Land Kabbalistic scholar
- Joshua Falk (Sma; Me'irat Einayim; 1555–1614)
- Moshe Isserles (Rema) (1520–1572), Polish halakhic authority and Posek, author of HaMapah component of the Shulkhan Arukh
- Yosef Karo (the Mechaber) (1488–1575), Spanish and Land of Israel legal codifier of the Shulkhan Arukh code of Torah Law
- Judah Loew ben Bezalel (Maharal) (1520–1609), Prague mystic and Talmudist
- Isaac Luria (Ha'ari) (1534–1572), Great Kabalist, basis for most recent Kabalists
- Solomon Luria (Maharshal) (1510–1573), Posek and Talmudist
- Obadiah ben Jacob Sforno (Sforno) (c. 1475 – 1550), Italian scholar and rationalist
- Chaim Vital (1543–1620), Kabbalist and primary disciple of Rabbi Isaac Luria
- David ben Solomon ibn Abi Zimra (Radbaz) (c. 1479 or c. 1487 – 1573), 15th/16th century Halakhist, Posek and Chief Rabbi of Egypt

=== 17th century ===
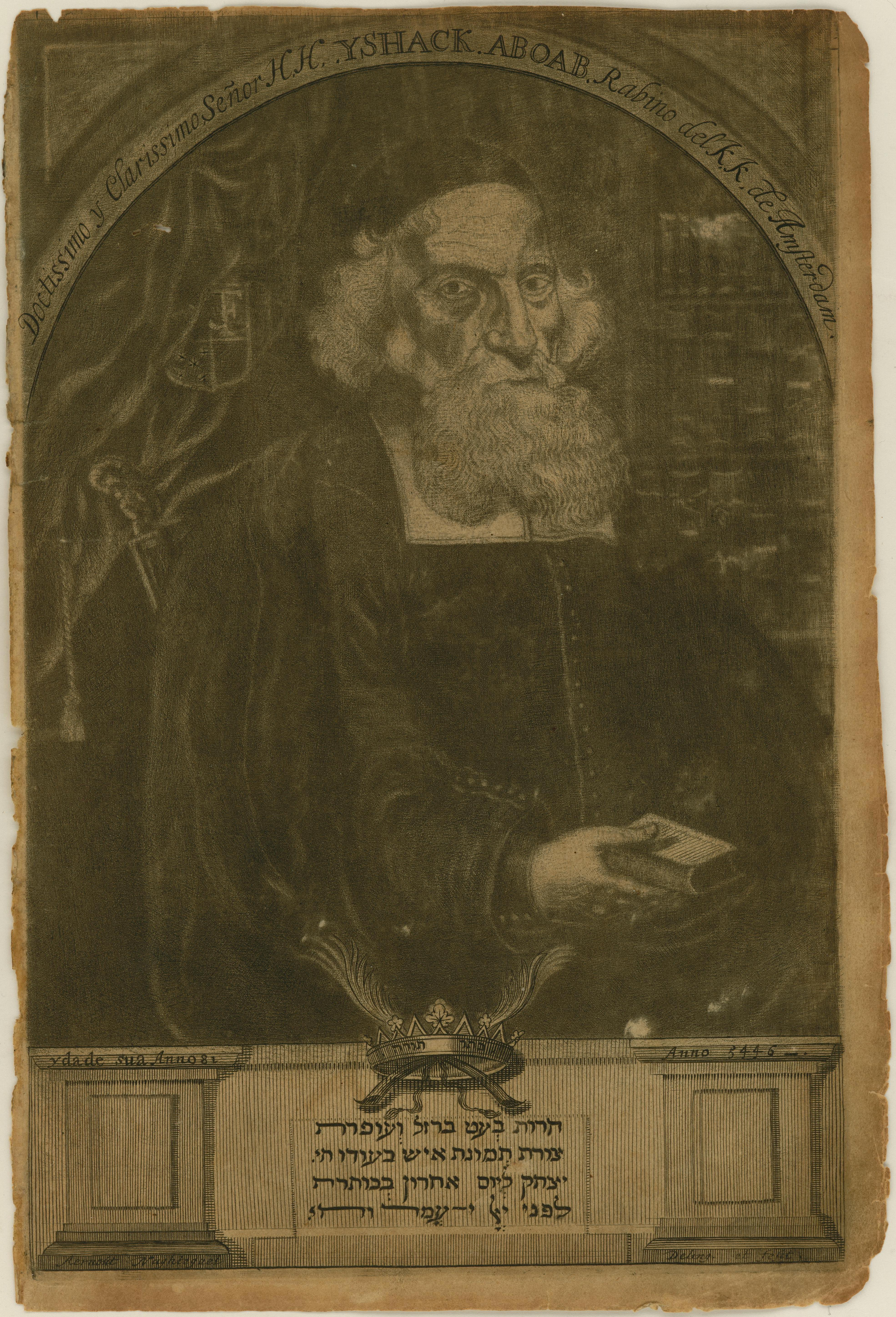
Isaac Aboab da Fonseca

- Samuel Eidels (Maharsha) (1555–1631), Talmudist famous for his commentary on the Talmud
- Ḥayyim Shabbethai (Maharhash) (1557–1643), Chief Rabbi of Thessaloniki, famous for his responsa.
- Menasseh Ben Israel (1604–1657), Portuguese/Dutch Kabbalist, diplomat and publisher
- Moses Raphael de Aguilar (1611–1679), Dutch Talmudist and Hebrew grammatician.
- Moses ben Isaac Judah Lima (Chelkath Mechokeik; c. 1615 – c. 1670)
- Shabbatai HaKohen (1621–1662; Siftei Kohen)
- David HaLevi Segal (Taz) (c. 1586 – 1667), Halakhist, major commentator on the Shulkhan Aruch
- Avraham Gombiner (Magen Avraham; c. 1635 – 1682)
- Hillel ben Naphtali Zevi (Bet Hillel) (1615–1690), Lithuanian scholar
- Isaac Aboab da Fonseca (1605–1693), Portuguese/Dutch scholar and Kabbalist, first Rabbi in the Americas
- Hezekiah da Silva (1659–1698; Peri Chodosh)
- Yair Bacharach (Havvot Yair) (1639–1702), German Talmudist
- Isaac Abendana (c. 1640–1710), Sephardic scholar in England
- Samuel ben Uri Shraga Phoebus (Beit Shmuel)

=== 18th century ===
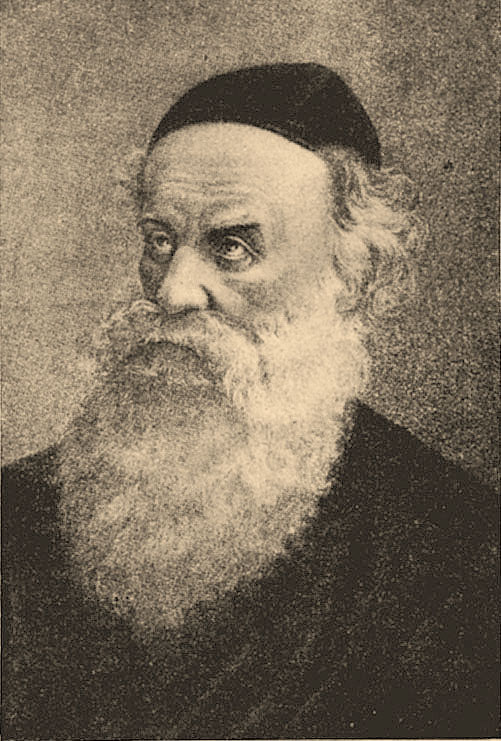
Shneur Zalman of Liadi

- Chaim ibn Attar (Ohr Hachaim; Peri Toar; 1696–1743)
- Jonathan Eybeschutz (Urim ve-Tummim; Kereti u-Peleti) (1690–1764) of Prague,
- Moshe Chaim Luzzatto (Ramchal) (1707–1746), Italian philosopher, mystic, and moralist
- Yehudah ben Shimon Ashkenazi (Ba'er Hetev; 1730–1770), a German rabbi
- Zechariah Mendel ben Aryeh Leib of Cracow (Ba'er Hetev)
- Joseph ben Meir Teomim (1727–1792; Pri Megadim)
- Vilna Gaon ("Gra") (1720–1797), Lithuanian Talmudist and Kabbalist.
- Chaim Yosef David Azulai ("Chida"; Birkei Yosef – a commentary on the Shulchan Aruch) (1724–1806)
- Jacob Emden (1697–1776), Danish/German scholar
- Shalom Sharabi (1720–1777), Yemenite Sage, Kabbalist and founder of the Beit El Yeshiva, Jerusalem
- Shneur Zalman of Liadi ('The Baal HaTanya'; Shulchan Aruch HaRav) (1745–1812)
- Elazar Fleckeles (1754–1826)
- Simcha Bunim of Peshischa (1767–1827)
- Samuel Loew (c. 1720–1806; Machatzis HaShekel)
- Aryeh Leib HaCohen Heller (c. 1745 – 1812; Ketzot HaChoshen)
- Avraham Danzig (1748–1820; Chayei Adam; Chochmat Adam)
- Yaakov Lorberbaum (1760–1832; Nesivos HaMishpat)
- Akiva Eger (1761–1837)

=== 19th century ===
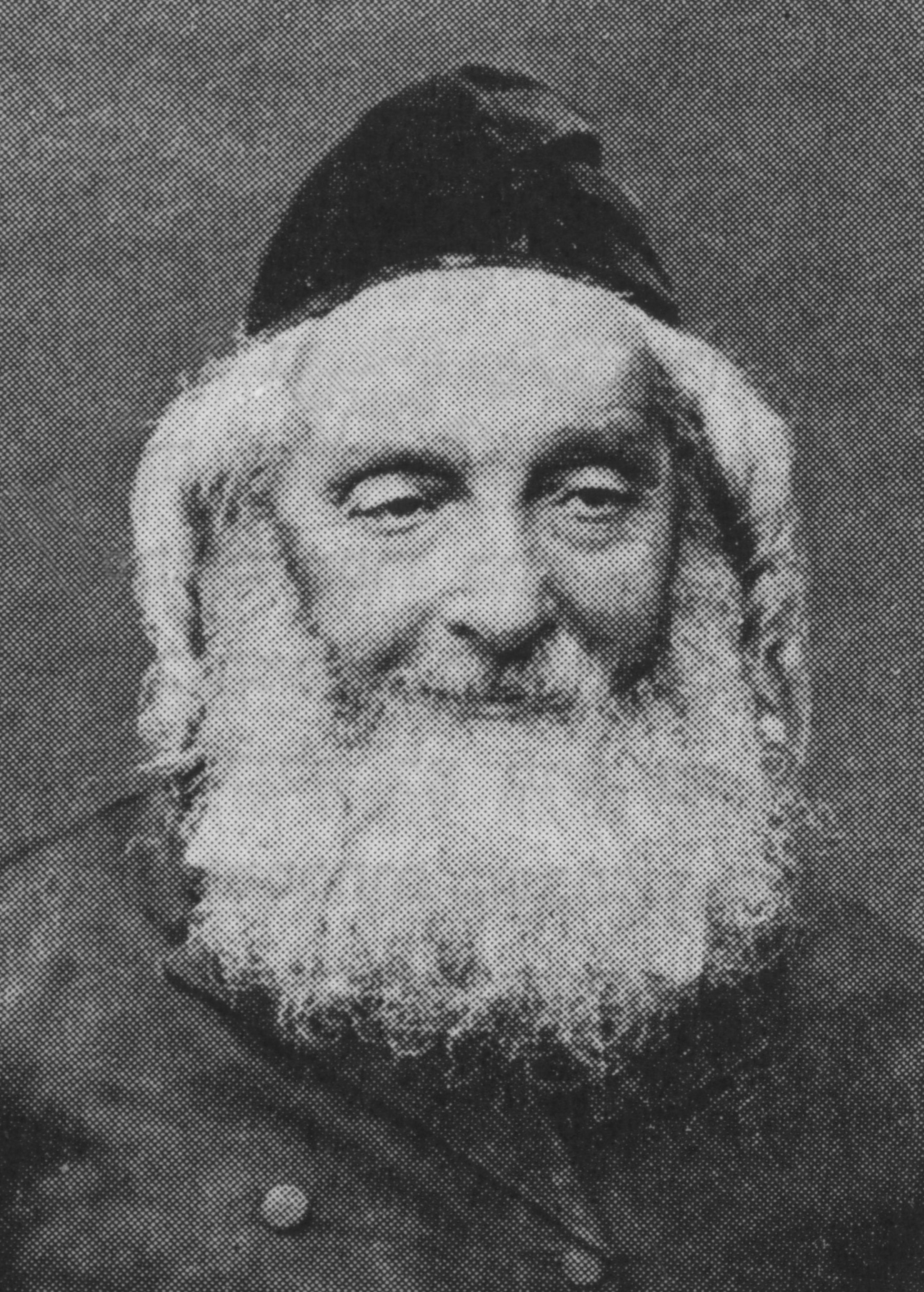
Naftali Zvi Yehuda Berlin

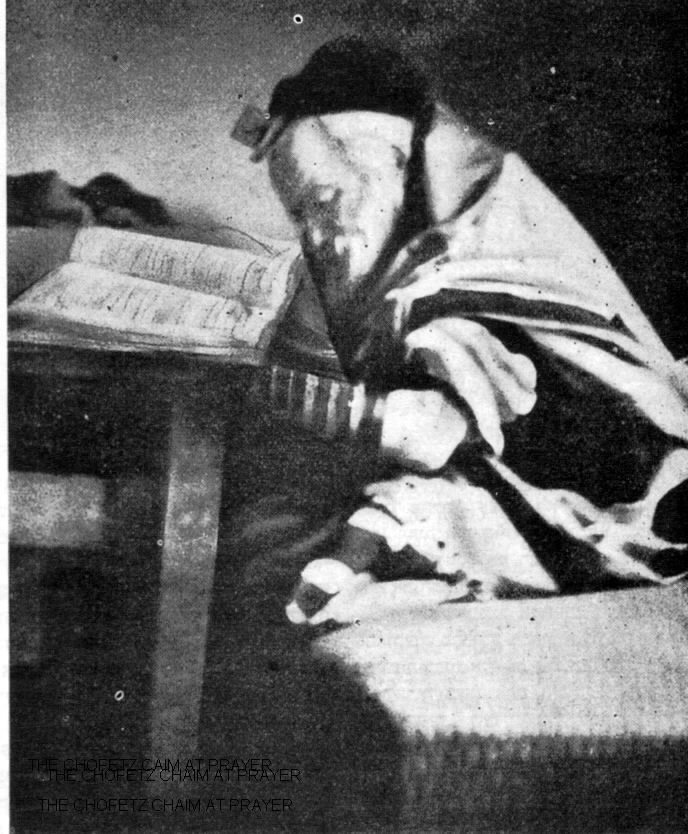
Israel Meir Kagan

- Yehudah Leib Alter (Sfas Emes) (1847–1905), Gerrer rebbe
- Naftali Zvi Yehuda Berlin (Netziv, HaEmek Davar) (1816–1893), head of Volozhin Yeshiva in Lithuania
- Abraham Hirsch ben Jacob Eisenstadt of Byelostok (1812–1868; Pithchei Teshuvah)
- Baruch Epstein (Torah Temimah) (1860–1941), Lithuanian Torah commentator
- Moshe Mordechai Epstein (Levush Mordechai) (1866–1933), Talmudist and co-head of Slabodka Yeshiva
- Yechiel Michel Epstein (Aruch HaShulchan) (1829–1908), Halakhist and Posek
- Samson Raphael Hirsch (1808–1888), German rabbi, founder of the Torah im Derech Eretz movement
- Yisrael Meir Kagan (Chofetz Chaim; Mishnah Berurah) (1838–1933), Polish Halakhist, Posek, and moralist
- Yosef Hayyim of Baghdad (Ben Ish Chai) (1835–1909), Iraqi Halakhist, Posek, Kabbalist and communal leader
- Meir Leib ben Yechiel Michel (Malbim) (1809–1879), Russian preacher and scholar
- Menachem Mendel Schneersohn (Tzemach Tzedek; 1789–1866)
- Moses Sofer (Chatam Sofer) (1762–1839), Hungarian rabbi
- Chaim Soloveitchik ("Reb Chaim Brisker") (1853–1918), Rosh Yeshivah in Valozhyn, Innovator of the Brisker method
- Yaakov Dovid Wilovsky (Ridbaz) (1845–1913), of Slutzk, Chicago and Tzfat (1845–1913)
- Meir Simcha of Dvinsk (Ohr Sameiach, Meshech Chochmah) (1843–1926), Lithuanian-Latvian Talmudist and communal leader

=== 20th century ===
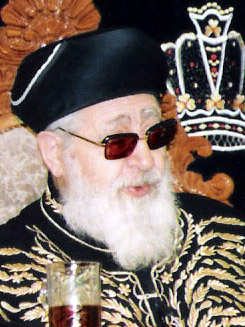
Ovadia Yosef

- Baruch Shalom HaLevi Ashlag (RaBaSh) (1907–1991), author of the Shlavei HaSulam and Shamati
- Yehuda Ashlag (Baal HaSulam) (1884–1954), author of The Sulam commentary on The Book of Zohar
- Shlomo Zalman Auerbach 1910–1995 Major Modern Posek in Israel
- Eliyahu Eliezer Dessler (Michtav Me'Eliyahu) (1892–1953), 20th century religious philosopher and ethicist
- Mordechai Eliyahu (1929–2010), Halakhist, Posek, and Sephardic Chief Rabbi of Israel (1983–1993)
- Moshe Feinstein (Igrot Moshe) (1895–1986), Russian-American Halakhist, Posek, and Talmudist
- Yitzchok Hutner (Pachad Yitzchok) (1906–1980), European-born American and Israeli Rosh Yeshiva
- Avrohom Yeshaya Karelitz (Chazon Ish) (1878–1953), Belarusian-born, leading halakhic authority and leader of Haredi Judaism in Israel
- Menachem Mendel Schneerson (1902–1994), seventh Rebbe of Chabad-Lubavitch
- Elazar Shach (1899–2001) (rav shach) Rosh Yeshiva Ponevezh and Posek
- Yaakov Chaim Sofer (1870–1939; Kaf Hachaim)
- Joseph B. Soloveitchik (1903–1993) (rav yoshe ber) 20th century Rosh Yeshiva, Talmudist, and religious philosopher.
- Joel Teitelbaum (Divrei Yoel; 1887–1979), the first Satmar rebbe
- Eliezer Waldenberg (1915–2006), the "Tzitz Eliezer" Major Modern Posek in Israel
- Shmuel Wosner (Shevet Halevi) (1913–2015), Posek, Yeshivat Chachmei Lublin
- Ovadia Yosef (1920–2013), Iraqi-born Halakhist, Posek and Sephardic Chief Rabbi of Israel (1973–1983)

== See also ==
- Rabbinic literature
- Eras of history important in Jewish law
- List of rabbis
- History of Responsa: Acharonim
