= HaKohen =

HaKohen (Hebrew: "The priest") is a Jewish given name and surname. Notable people with the name include:

- Nathan HaKohen Adler (1741–1800), German kabbalist
- Meir Simcha HaKohen of Dvinsk (1843–1926), rabbi and prominent leader of Orthodox Judaism in Eastern Europe
- Shneur Chaim HaKohen Gutnick (1921–2003), Orthodox Jewish Chabad rabbi in Australia
- Aaron ben Jacob ben David Hakohen Provençal rabbi, living at Narbonne, France who suffered the expulsion of the Jews in 1306
- Abraham ben Shabbetai Hakohen (1670–1729), Jewish physician, rabbi, religious philosopher and poet on Zante
- Akhiyahu HaKohen (fl. 910 CE), rabbi and Hebrew-language grammarian in Tiberias
- Alexandri HaKohen (died 1349), prominent 14th century rabbinic authority born in Erfurt, Germany
- David Hakohen, late thirteenth-century Hebrew liturgical poet from Avignon
- Isaac Hakohen (1013–1103), Moroccan Talmudist and posek
- Ishmael ben Elisha Hakohen, leader of the first generation of the Tannaim
- Joseph Hakohen (1496–1575), historian and physician of the 16th century
- Malachi ben Jacob HaKohen (1695–1772), renowned Talmudist, methodologist, Kaballists
- Matityahu ben Yochanan HaKohen (died 165 BC), Jewish priest with a role in the Jewish revolt against the Syrian Greeks
- Shabbatai HaKohen (1621–1662), 17th Century talmudist and halakhist
- Shlomo HaKohen (Vilna) (1828–1905), the famed Av Beis Din and Posek of Vilna
- Yeshivas Rabbeinu Yisrael Meir HaKohen, is a major Orthodox yeshiva in the United States based in Kew Gardens Hills, Queens, New York
- Yisroel Meir HaKohen (1839–1933), influential rabbi of the Musar movement, a Halakhist, posek, and ethicist
- Yonatan Hakohen (1135–1210), leading French tosafist
- Zadok HaKohen of Lublin, a significant Jewish thinker and Hasidic leader
- Abraham HaKohen Kalisker (1741–1810), prominent Chassidic Rabbi of the 3rd generation of Chassidic leaders
- Chanokh Heynekh HaKohen Levin (1798–1870), of Aleksander, served as the rebbe of a community of thousands of Hasidim
- Shlomo HaKohen of Lissa (18th century), rabbi and biblical commentator
- Yehuda HaKohen ben Meir, German rabbi and Talmudic scholar of the late tenth and early eleventh century CE from Mainz
- Isaac HaKohen Rapoport, 18th-century rabbi who lived in Palestine; born and died at Jerusalem, a pupil of rabbi Hezekiah da Silva
- Zvi Yosef HaKohen Resnick (1841–1912), orthodox Russian rabbi and Rosh yeshivah
- Mnachem Hakohen Risikoff (1866–1960), orthodox rabbi in Russia and the United States, prolific author of scholarly works
- Mordechai HaKohen of Safed (1523–1598), scholar and kabbalist who flourished in the second half of the sixteenth century in Safed
- Aaron HaKohen ibn Sargado, tenth-century AD gaon (Jewish religious leader) in Pumbedita, Babylonia
- Sholom HaKohen Schwadron (1912–1997), Haredi rabbi and orator
- Meir HaKohen Shiff (1608–1644), German rabbi and Talmud scholar
