= Ephraim Hekscher =

Head of the Jewish congregation of Altona

Ephraim ben Samuel Sanvel Hekscher (Hebrew: אפרים בן שמואל זנוויל העקשיר, romanized: Efrayim ben Shemuʼel Zanṿil Heḳshir; c. 1680–1759) was head of the Jewish congregation of Altona at the beginning of the 18th century. He was the author of Dibre ḥakhamim ve-ḥidotam, giving the sources and interpretations of many rabbinical laws; Adne paz, responsa on the Shulḥan 'Arukh, especially on Oraḥ Ḥayyim; and Livyat Ḥen, novellæ on the Talmud.

== Publications ==
- Dibre ḥakhamim ve-ḥidotam. Altona. 1743.
- Adne paz. Altona. 1743.
- Livyat Ḥen. Vol. 1. Altona. 1732.
- Livyat Ḥen. Vol. 2. Altona. 1743.
