= Abraham Oppenheim (rabbi) =

German rabbi

Personal life
- Born: Mannheim
- Died: November 2, 1786 Hanover

Religious life
- Religion: Judaism

Abraham ben Löb Oppenheim (died November 2, 1786) was a German rabbi. He was for many years a member of the Kloyz of Mannheim. He later held similar positions in Amsterdam and Hanover, where he died at an advanced age.

Oppenheim published various notes on the Oraḥ Ḥayyim, including Margenita Shappira (Amsterdam, 1767), on the regulations concerning the shofar, and Eshel Abraham, on the Be'er Heṭeb.
