= Joseph ben Meir Teomim =

Galician rabbi (1727–1792)

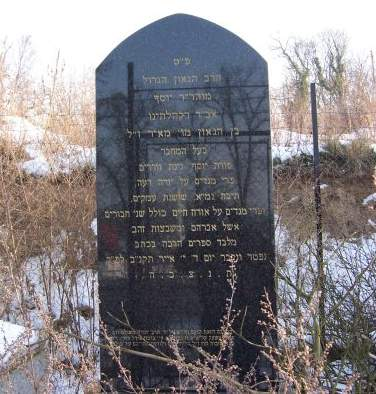
Tombstone of Joseph ben Meir Teomim

Joseph ben Meir Teomim (1727–1792; Hebrew: יוסף בן מאיר תאומים) was a Galician rabbi, best known as author of Pri Megadim, by which title he is also referenced. He was one of the foremost Torah Scholars of his time, a "thorough student of rabbinical literature, and...not unlearned in the secular sciences".

== Biography ==
Teomim was born in Shchyrets, then in Poland (today in Ukraine). His father, Rabbi Meir Teomim, became Dayan (rabbinic judge) and Rosh Yeshiva in Lemberg (Lvov), and the family moved there.

Teomim studied Torah, primarily under his father, in the Lvov yeshivah; while still young he took up a position as "preacher and rabbinical instructor" there. At the age of 20 he moved to Komarno to marry. He spent more than a decade there primarily studying and writing, and also working as a melamed.

In 1767, on the invitation of Daniel Itzig, he went to Berlin to co-head a Bet Midrash with Rabbi Hirschel Levin. Following his Father's death in 1771, Teomim returned to Lemberg, eventually becoming Dayan there. In 1782 he was appointed Rabbi at Frankfurt an der Oder, where he remained until his death.

He was buried in the Jewish cemetery at Frankfurt/Oder.

== Works ==
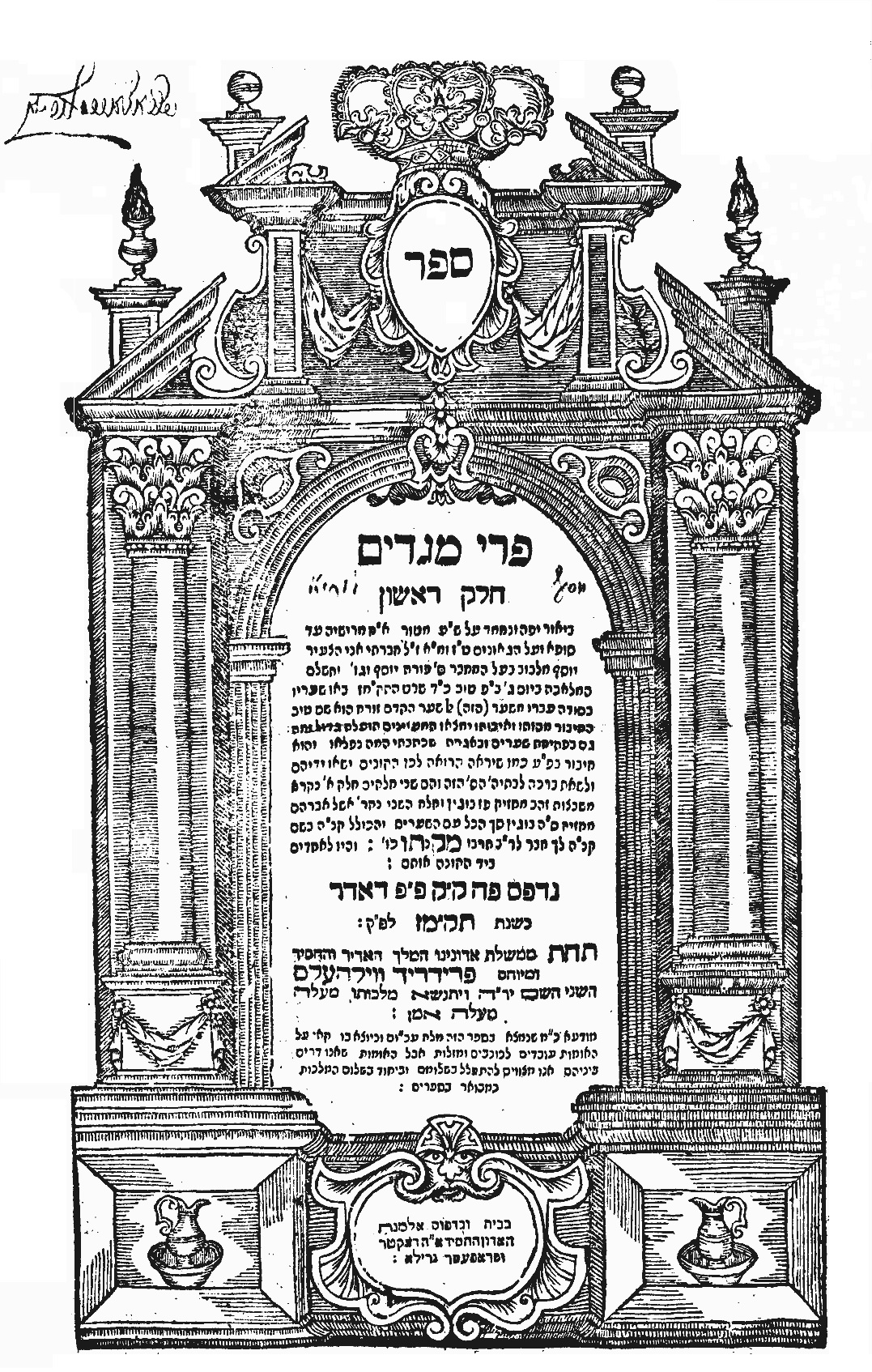
Pri Megadim title page (1787 printing)

Teomim's Pri Megadim (פרי מגדים, "choice fruits", published 1782) is a widely referenced work on the Shulkhan Aruch. It is composed, essentially, as a supercommentary on the major commentators there: on the Orach chayyim section, Mishbetzot Zahav discusses David ben Samuel's Turei Zahav, and Eshel Avraham is on Avraham Gombiner's Magen Avraham; on the Yoreh De'ah section, Siftei Da'at discusses Shabbethai Kohen's Siftei Kohen, and Mishbetzot Zahav is continued. Pri Megadim is however seen as authoritative in its own right, often quoted, for example, by the Mishna Berurah.

Teomim also authored, among other works:

- Porat Yosef, novellæ on Yebamot and Ketubot, with rules for halakhic decisions (Zolkiev, 1756)
- Rosh Yosef, novellæ on Berachos, Shabbos, Pesachim, Beitzah, Megillah, and Chullin
- Ginnat Vradim, seventy rules for the comprehension of the Talmud (Frankfort-on-the-Oder, 1767)
- Tebat Gome, explanations on Torah (Frankfort-on-the-Oder, 1782)
- Shoshanat ha-'Amakim, a methodology of the Talmud, published together with the preceding
- No'am Megadim, commentaries on the prayers, published with the prayer-book Hegyon Leb.
- Sefer ha-Maggid, a commentary on the Torah and the Haftarot, sermons for Shabbat and festivals, and a twofold commentary on Pirke Avot (left in manuscript.)
- Em la-Binah, a Hebrew, Talmudic Aramaic, and Biblical Aramaic lexicon (left in manuscript.)

In the introduction to the latter, Rabbi Teomim mentions a great number of his writings on halakhot and ethics, which are no longer in existence.
