= Eisenstadt (disambiguation) =

Eisenstadt is a city in Austria, the state capital of Burgenland.

Eisenstadt may also refer to:

== Places ==
- Eisenstadt-Umgebung, an Austrian district in Burgenland
- Diocese of Eisenstadt, an Austrian Catholic diocese

== People ==
- Eisenstadt (surname)

== Other uses ==
- Eisenstadt v. Baird, an important United States Supreme Court case (1972)
