= Hillel ben Naphtali Zevi =

Hillel ben Naphtali Zevi (Hebrew: הלל בן נפתלי צבי; 1615 – January 3, 1690) also known as Hillel Ben Naphtali Herz, was a Lithuanian rabbi.

== Biography ==
He was born at Brest-Litovsk in 1615; he died at Zolkiev (Zhovkva) January 3, 1690. After he had studied under Hirsh Darshan, Hillel went to Vilna, where from 1650 to 1651 he was a member of the rabbinical college, and the bet din (Jewish court) of Moses ben Isaac Judah Lima where he was one of the signatories to a halakhic decision that women could not be deprived of their right to oppose divorce against their will. He stayed at Vilna until 1666, then became rabbi in Kėdainiai and several other Lithuanian towns. He was called in 1670 as rabbi to Altona and Hamburg, and in 1680 to Zolkiev. He was also a delegate to the Council of the Four Lands at the fair of Yaroslav.

Hillel was the author of an important work entitled Bet Hillel, a commentary and novellæ on the four parts of the Shulkhan Arukh, an important code of Jewish law. His son, Moses ben Hillel, published only the portions on Yoreh De'ah and Eben ha-Ezer, with the text (Dyhernfurth, 1691). He also wrote under the same title a homiletic and mystical commentary on the Pentateuch.
