= Daniel ben Jacob =

- Died: April 29, 1807 Grodno, Grodno Governorate, Russian Empire

Religious life
- Religion: Judaism

Daniel ben Jacob of Grodno (Hebrew: דניאל בן יעקב, romanized: Daniyel ben Yaʻaḳov; died April 29, 1807) was a Russian halakhist. He served as dayyan in Grodno for forty years.

He was the author of Ḥamude Daniel ('The Precious Things of Daniel'), on questions concerning the preparation of food (Grodno, 1810). His opinions are frequently mentioned in Tzvi Hirsch Eisenstadt's widely used work, Pitḥe Teshuvah, on Yoreh De'ah.
