= Mstsibava =

Village in Grodno Region, Belarus

Mstsibava Мсцібава (Belarusian) Мстибово (Russian)
- Village
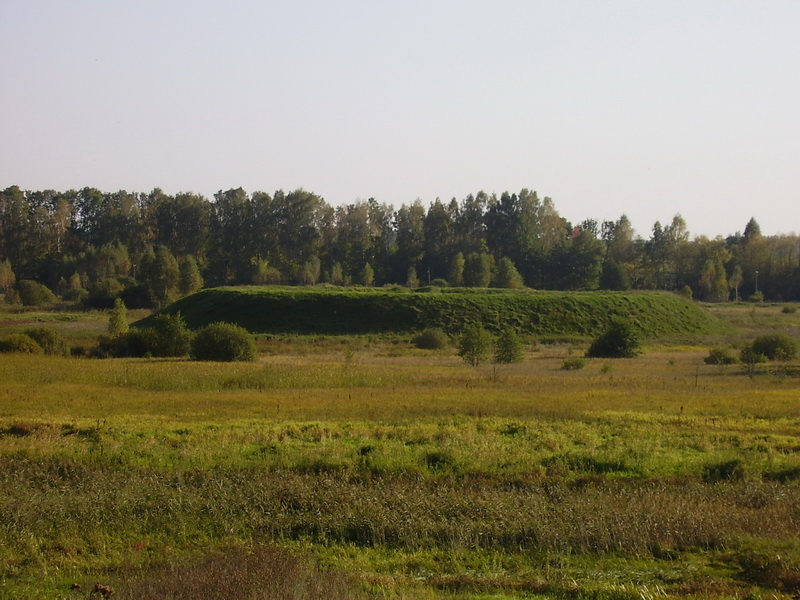
- Site of the original settlement

- Location within Belarus
- Coordinates: 53°06′45″N 24°15′29″E
- Country: Belarus
- Region: Grodno Region
- District: Vawkavysk District

Population (2013)
  - Total: 500
- Time zone: UTC+3 (MSK)
- Area code: +375 1512

Mstsibava or Mstibovo (Belarusian: Мсці́бава, romanized: Mscibava; Russian: Мсти́бово; Polish: Mścibów; Yiddish: אַמסטיבעווע, romanized: Amstibeve) is a village in Vawkavysk District, Grodno Region, Belarus. It is part of Hnyezna selsoviet.

== History ==
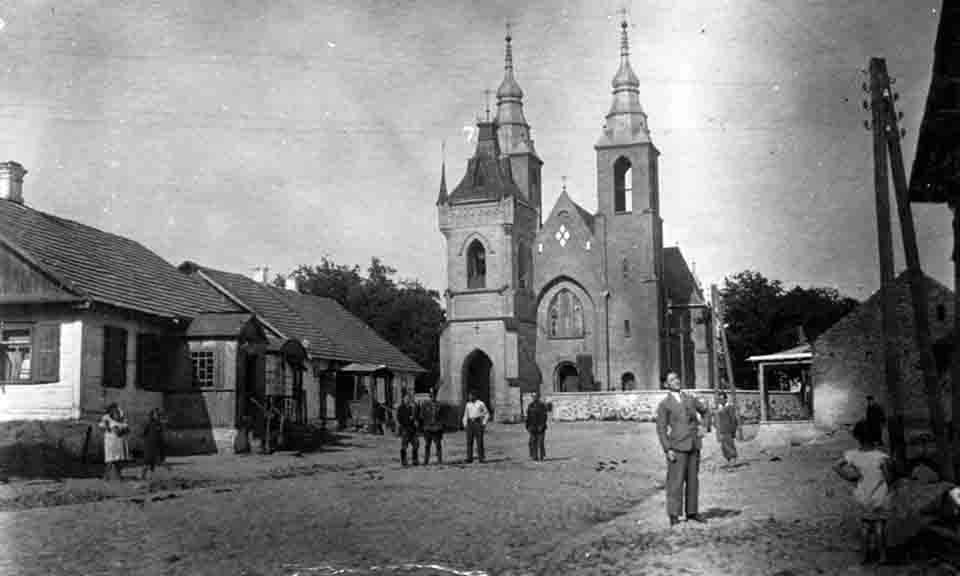
Historic photo of Mstibovo, including Kostel Svyatogo Ioanna Krestitelya (English: Church of St. John the Baptist)

=== In the Grand Duchy of Lithuania ===
An early settlement [BE] existed in the area in the 12th-13th century under the Grand Duchy of Lithuania, where a wooden fort was built. The village was also home to a palace, sometimes called the Schloss, which had been built by Jogaila as his summer home. Although the first settlers were pagans (hence the name Mstibovo, named after a pagan deity), the village later became Christian, with a Catholic church built in 1512.

==== 17th century ====
During the Deluge, the village and its ancient fort were burnt down.

==== 18th century ====
The fort was rebuilt in 1715, and in 1770, burnt down again.

=== As part of the Russian Empire ===
In 1795, Mstibovo came under Russian rule with the Third Partition of Poland.

==== 19th century ====
During the French invasion of Russia in 1812, Napoleon's Grande Armée was welcomed in Mstibovo. Napoleon appointed a Jew as the village's mayor. Soon after however, the Russians retook the region.

==== 20th century ====
In the late nineteenth century, the village grew exponentially, and in 1914, numbered 1,137 residents.

During World War I, fighting erupted in Mstibovo, first between the Russians and Germans, and later between the Russians and Polish, which resulted in the partial destruction of the village.

=== As part of the Polish Republic ===
In 1921, Mstibovo came under Polish control.

=== Part of USSR ===
==== World War II ====
In 1939, during World War II, the region was taken by the Russians and incorporated into the Byelorussian Soviet Socialist Republic (BSSR), and in 1941, it was conquered by the Nazis. During World War II, the town's rector, Mark Burak, was murdered along with 50 parishioners. After the Soviet victory in 1945, Mstibovo was once more part of BSSR.

After the dissolution of the Soviet Union in 1991, the BSSR was renamed Republic of Belarus, under whose authority Mstibovo remains.

=== Jewish community ===
Mstibovo was home to an ancient Jewish community, dating back to the Middle Ages (evident from tombstones in the ancient Jewish cemetery). The community, approximately 80 families, lived in the center of the village, where its synagogue was situated. Rabbis in the community's history include Rabbi Meir HaKohen (father of Rabbi Shabbatai HaKohen), Rabbi David HaLevi Segal, and Rabbi Isser Yehuda Unterman.

During the Holocaust, in late June 1941, the village's Jews were transported to Vawkavysk and from there to Treblinka where they were gassed to death. Reportedly, there was one survivor who went back to Mstibovo after the war.

== Today ==
Mstibovo is currently under the governance of the Hniezna Selsoviet in the Vawkavysk District, Grodno Region, Belarus. The village is home to a school, a library, and a church. Valuable items from the nineteenth and twentieth centuries are stored in the church.

As of 2013, it has 500 residents, nearly twice as many than the 287 residents in 2007.

== Notable residents ==
- Rabbi Shabbatai HaKohen, Halakhist, Talmudist, born in Mstibovo
- Rabbi Isser Yehuda Unterman, chief rabbi of Israel, served as Mstibovo's rabbi for six years

== See also ==
- Vowpa
