= Leib ben Samuel Zevi Hirsch =

Polish–Lithuanian rabbi

Personal life
- Born: c. 1630 Pinczow, Polish–Lithuanian Commonwealth
- Died: 1714 Brest-Litovsk, Polish–Lithuanian Commonwealth

Religious life
- Religion: Judaism

Aryeh Judah Leib ben Samuel Zevi Hirsch (Hebrew: אריה יהודה ליב בן שמואל צבי הירש; c. 1630–1714) was a Polish–Lithuanian rabbi.

== Biography ==
Leib was born about 1630, likely in the Polish city of Pinczow. He was on his father's side the grandson of Joel Sirkes, and stepson of David ben Samuel ha-Levi, of whom he was also the pupil. He also studied under Joshua Höschel, author of Maginne Shelomoh, and under Yom-Tov Lipmann Heller.

He was rabbi successively of Swirz, Galicia (before 1663), Kamorna, Stobnitz, Zamosc (1679–1689), Tiktin, Cracow, and finally Brest-Litovsk (1701–1714). He was considered by his contemporaries so great a Talmudic authority that in 1669 he was sent with his stepbrother Isaiah ha-Levi to Constantinople to investigate the claims of Shabbethai Zevi. His responsa were published later, under the title Sha'agat Aryeh (Neuwied, 1736), by his grandson Abraham Nathan Meisels, who added some of his own under the title Kol Shaḥal. Other responsa of Löb's are to be found in the Shevut Ya'akov edited by his grandson, and in Teshuvot Geonim Batra'e, published first in Turkey by the author of Ma'ane Elihu, and afterward in Prague (1816).

== Selected publications ==
- Sha'agat Aryeh (in Hebrew). Neuwied. 1736.
