= Malka Rokeach =

Rebbetzin Malka Rokeach
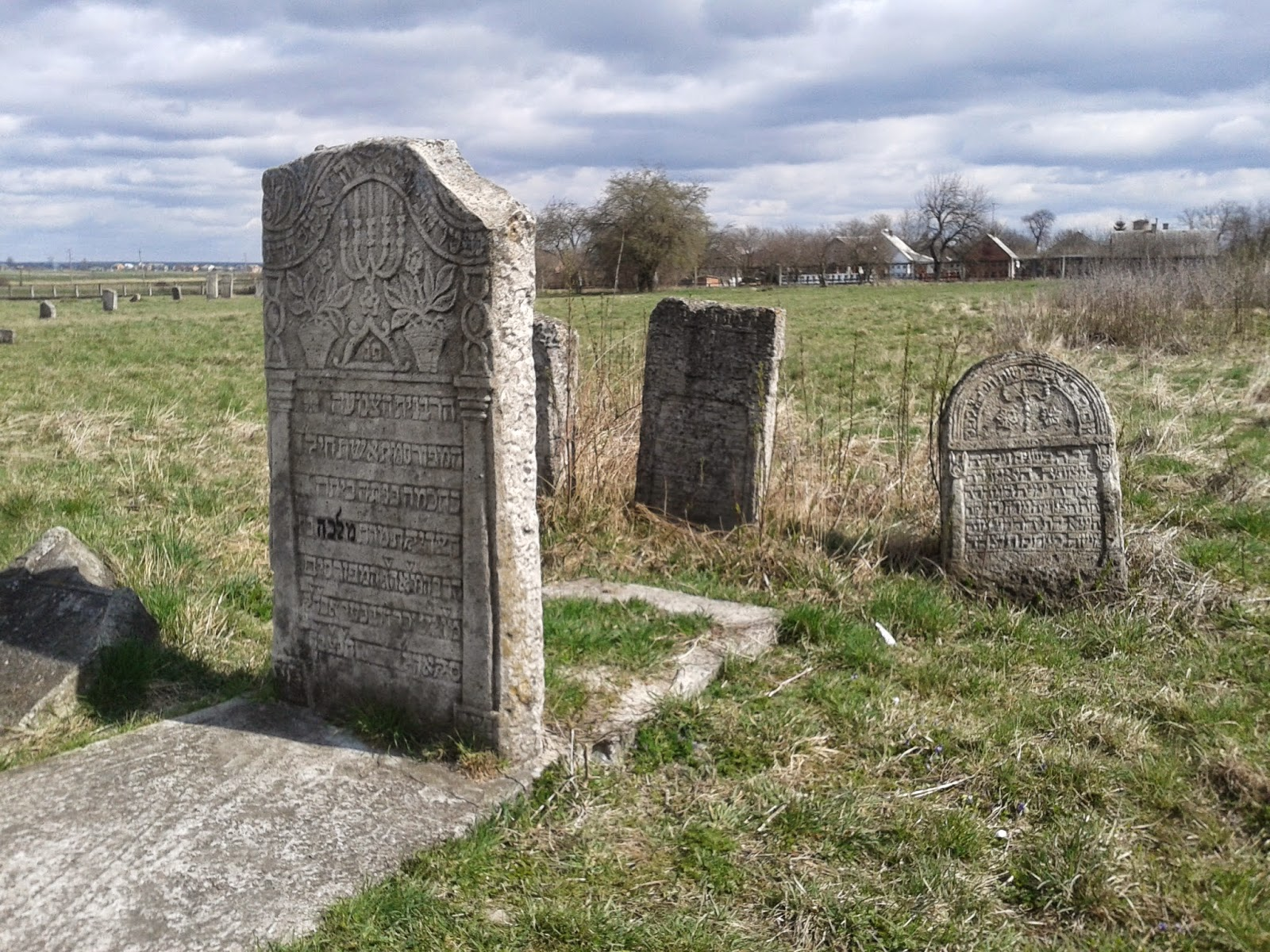
- Born: Malka Ramraz; 1780
- Died: September 1853 (aged 72–73)
- Title: First rebbetzin of Belz
- Spouse: Sholom Rokeach
- Parent(s): Yissachar Dov and Chana Rachel Ramraz

Malka Rokeach (Hebrew: מלכה רוקח) (1780-1850 CE) was the first rebbetzin of the Hasidic dynasty of Belz. She was the wife of Rabbi Sholom Rokeach, the first rebbe of Belz, and the mother of the second rebbe of the dynasty, Rabbi Yehoshua Rokeach. She was directly involved in the ongoings in her husband's court.

== Life ==
She was born in 1780 to Rabbi Yissachar Dov Ramraz of Sokal, Galicia and Rebbetzin Chana Rachel (née Tisminitzer), a great-granddaughter of Rabbi Zechariah Mendel ben Aryeh Leib of Cracow, author of Ba'er Hetev on Yoreh De'ah and Choshen Mishpat.

Malka married her first-cousin, Rabbi Sholom Rokeach, son of Rabbi Elazar Rokeach and Rebbetzin Rivka Henna Ramraz, her father's sister. They had five sons and two daughters.

Rabbi Sholom considered Malka as his partner in his Torah study and in all of his spiritual endeavors. He said that when he took it upon himself to remain awake one thousand nights to study Torah, Malka stood at his side to ensure that his candle remained lit so that he shouldn't have to interrupt his Torah study.

Malka died in September 1853 (8 Elul, 5613 A.M.) and was buried in Belz. Each year on the day of her yahrzeit, 8 Elul, Belzer Hasidim continue to light candles in her memory. The girls' schools of the Belzer Hasidim are named in her honor.

Her brother was the father-in-law of Rabbi Yechezkel Shraga Halberstam, in the latter's fourth marriage.
