= Samuel Loew =

Czech rabbi (c. 1720–1806)

Samuel ben Nathan Ha-Levi Loew (Kelin or Kolin) (also "Lōw" or "Löw", Hebrew: שמואל בן נתן נטע הלוי קעלין; c. 1720–1806) was a Talmudist and Halakhist, best known for his work Machatzit HaShekel (Ashkenazi pronunciation, Machatzis HaShekel).

The son of Nathan Naṭe ha-Levi, he was born at Kolín, Bohemia. For nearly 60 years he headed over a yeshiva at Boskovice (Boskowitz), Moravia, where he died on May 20, 1806. He had the title Av Beis Din of Boskowitz.

Samuel had 3 sons and 3 daughters: Benjamin Ze'ev Ha-Levi (Wolf) Boskowitz (1746–1818), Jacob (c. 1750–1833), Jehuda (c. 1751–1800), Sara (Hinda) married Markus (Mordechai Lob) Wassertrilling of Boskovice, Esther married Bernhard Biach. His son Wolf Boskowitz delivered the sermon at his funeral. His descendant in the 5th generation, Dr. Max Anton Löw, a convert to Roman Catholicism, was the attorney of the anti-Semite Francis Deckert.

== Works ==
His works were published under the name Machatzit HaShekel as follows; these commentaries appear nowadays in most editions of the Shulchan Aruch:

- An extensive super-commentary on Abraham Abele Gombiner's Magen Abraham on Shulchan Aruch, Orach Chayim (Vienna, 1807–1808; 2d ed. 1817; several times reprinted)
- A super-commentary on the "Shakh" on Shulchan Aruch, Yoreh Deah Hilchot Niddah (Lemberg, 1858) and Hilchot Melichah (ib. 1860)
- Novellas on several tractates from the Babylonian Talmud: Eruvin, Shabbat, Reh, Sukkah, Gitin, Kiddushin, Baba Metzia, Chulin, Baba Batra, Ketubot, Pesachim, Ketubot, Makhot, Avoda Zara, and more
- Sermons
