= Aaron Worms =

German rabbi

Aaron Worms was a chief rabbi of Metz and a Talmudist; the son of Abraham Aberle, he was born July 7, 1754, in Geislautern, a small village near Völklingen (some say Kaiserslautern); died at Metz, May 2, 1836.

== Biography ==
Worms came from a family of rabbis and was destined for a rabbinical career. He received his early education from his father, Abraham Aberle, and afterwards was sent to Metz, the nearest city having a rabbinical college. This institution was directed by Chief Rabbi Loeb Günzburg (known by this main work, Sha'agat Aryeh), with whom Aaron gained such high favor that at the early age of fifteen he was allowed to deliver a lecture on a halakhic subject in the synagogue of Metz. Through Günzburg's instrumentality, he was appointed in 1777 to the rabbinate of Kriechingen in German Lorraine. Having lived in that town for seven years, he returned to Metz, where, after the death of Günzburg on June 23, 1785, Aaron was chosen principal of the rabbinical college. For many years he officiated as associate rabbi and deputy chief rabbi, and on June 12, 1832, was unanimously elected chief rabbi. The government confirmed his election, although he had not mastered French as required by the law regulating the appointment of rabbis. Four years later he died, revered and beloved by both Orthodox and Progressive Jews. Aaron was so conservative in his views that even in his practical life he did not acquire a thorough knowledge of the language of his country, and still regarded the Zohar as a sacred book and as the composition of Simeon ben Yoḥai. Nevertheless, he gave expression to opinions that in some measure prepared the way for Jewish reforms.

Aaron's son-in-law was Yehuda Meir Lambert, who succeeded him as Chief Rabbi of Metz and opened a rabbinic school in the city and was a fierce opponent against Reform Judaism.

So greatly was Worms influenced by the French Revolution that he even dressed himself in the uniform of the National Guard and, to accord with military regulation, removed his beard. Aaron fully realized that the Jews, in receiving rights, had also duties to fulfil; and in a sermon preached during the Revolutionary period, he strongly rebuked the Jews for their aversion to handicrafts, and, as an example for them, apprenticed his son Elijah to an artisan. As a member of the Grand Sanhedrin convened by Napoleon, he delivered an impressive address on the "Relations of the Jews to Non-Jews according to Rabbinic Law," in which he demonstrated that the Talmudic opinions concerning the heathen should not be used as guides in the regulation of practical life under the conditions that existed then. Again, in purely Jewish affairs, in questions concerning rites and ceremonies, he showed himself remarkably broad-minded. Upon the occasion of his taking the oath as chief rabbi, administered by the government officials, his hat was handed him to cover himself. He refused it with a smile, saying: "God does not wish to impose upon us the duty of approaching Him bareheaded; but if we do so voluntarily, so much the better!" This cannot be regarded simply as a bon mot; for he did not hesitate publicly to declare himself in accord with the reform tendencies which were then beginning to force their way into the synagogue.

== Reform tendencies ==
Worms was perhaps the only conservative rabbi of that period who expressed the opinion that it was better to pray in the vernacular than to mutter Hebrew prayers without understanding their meaning. On this ground, he refused to join the agitation against the reforms of the Hamburg Temple. His insight into the necessity of a reform in divine service is further shown by his protest against the custom of interrupting the ritual prayers by the insertion of piyyuṭim, of whose authors he often spoke derisively. Such a man could not be a friend of superstitious customs, and he made a vigorous stand against them. He looked also with a critical eye upon other customs which he did not regard as obligatory on the mere ground of usage, and more than once he remarked, with an undertone of bitterness, that Moses Isserles (the ReMA) desired to force all Jewry under the yoke of Polish customs; but he saw no reason why German and French Jews should yield.

In an article in the 2010 edition of the journal Yerushaseinu, it has been argued vehemently that Worms in no way a supporter of reform and instead was an ardent supporter of preserving custom and halacha as is evident throughout his works, and instead was the subject of slander after his death. As for opposition to Isserles' rulings, German and French rabbinic authorities for centuries were opposed to changing their customs to that of the ReMA, as the German and French Jewish customs long preceded him and were primarily based on the rulings of the Ashkenazic Rishonim. As for wanting to remove some of the piyutim, Aaron was hardly the first rabbi in favor of doing so, and by the 1800s most of Polish Jewry had stopped saying piyutim except on the High Holidays, and the question of interrupting the prayers with piyutim was hardly a new one. As for questioning certain customs, Aaron was certainly not the first rabbinic source to do so. He felt that some of the customs were superstitious had no source in the Talmud and ran counter to Jewish behavior. Each of the customs he questions were similarly questioned by other authorities. A biography of Worms is found in the Chida's work Shem Hagedolim, who avoided entries on anyone of questionable character or one straying from "Orthodox" Judaism.

Aaron was the author of "Meore Or" (Flashes of Light), Metz, 1789-1830. This work, published anonymously (the author modestly limiting himself to a mere suggestion of his name), is the only one of its kind. It contains critical remarks as well as comments on most of the treatises of the Talmud and on a considerable part of the "Oraḥ Ḥayyim" section of the Shulchan Aruch, which exhibit a thoroughly scientific spirit as well as an extraordinary acumen. A Christian admirer of Worms said that half of that work would be sufficient to open the gates of any European academy to its author. In addition to this, Worms published short notes on the Machzor and the Passover Haggadah (Metz editions). With the exception of a Bible commentary which has not been published, Aaron's other numerous manuscripts were destroyed in compliance with his wishes as expressed in his will.
