= Abraham Hirsch Eisenstadt =

Mid-19th century Russian rabbi who wrote Pitchei Teshuvah

Abraham Tzvi Hirsch ben Jacob Eisenstadt of Byelostok (1812–1868) (Hebrew: אברהם צבי הירש בן יעקב אייזנשטאט) served as rabbi in Utyan (Utena), government of Kovno, and died in Königsberg in 1868.

== Biography ==
He was born to Rabbi Yaakov Eisenstadt in Białystok, in the Russian Empire, in 1813 , a descendant of Rabbi Meir Eisenstadt, author of the responsa Panim Me’irot. At the age of 15, he married Yenta Reizel, daughter of Yehuda Leib HaKohen of Grodno, and lived with her in Białystok. His wife was engaged in commerce and ran a shop selling paper goods and writing instruments, while he devoted himself to Torah study in the beit midrash of Rabbi Yechiel Neches, along with Rabbi Shmuel HaLevi (author of Bigdei Yesha) and Rabbi Gershon Chen-Tov (author of Mincha Chadasha). The shop’s main customers were government institutions in the city. A few years later, when the government offices moved to Grodno, the couple relocated there as well. However, their business did not succeed in the new location, and in order to support his family, Rabbi Eisenstadt accepted a position as a dayan (rabbinical judge) in the city for several years.

In 1836, he was chosen to serve as the rabbi of Bristovitz in the Grodno district. From there, he went on to serve as the rabbi of Utyan (Utena) in the Kovno region.

In the winter of 5628, he traveled to Königsberg on the Baltic coast for medical treatment. He died there on the 3rd of Elul that same year (1868).

He was buried there, between Rabbi Yehuda Ashkenazi of Tykocin, author of Be’er Heitev, and Rabbi Yaakov Tzvi Mecklenburg, author of HaKetav VeHaKabbalah.

== Works ==
He began at an early age to write his important work, Pitchei Teshuvah (פתחי תשובה), which is the most popular and useful index to the responsa and decisions of later authorities on the subjects treated in the Shulchan Aruch. Eisenstadt's great merit consists in having collected all the material given in the works of his predecessors, and in having added to it an almost complete collection of references to responsa of all the later eminent rabbis.

Also of value are the novellae which Eisenstadt added to Pitchei Teshuvah under the title Nachalat Tzvi. The part of Pitchei Teshuvah on Yoreh De'ah was published at Vilna in 1836 (republished Jitomir, 1840, and Lemberg, 1858); that on Even haEzer, in 1862; and, after the author's death, that on Ḥoshen Mishpaṭ, in Lemberg, 1876 (republished in Vilna, 1896).

Eisenstadt is also the author of a commentary on the Seder Gittin veHalitzah, by Michael ben Joseph of Cracow, Vilna, 1863, 2d ed. 1896.
