= Judah Ashkenazi =

18th-century Polish rabbi

Rabbi Judah Ashkenazi
- יהודה אשכנזי

Personal life
- Parent: Simon (father)

Religious life
- Religion: Judaism

Judah ben Simon Sofer Frankfurt Ashkenazi (Tiktin) was a Polish commentator on the Shulchan Aruch. He officiated as "dayyan" (a judge in a Jewish religious court) at Tikotzin, Poland, in the first half of the eighteenth century.

== Main work ==
He wrote Ba'er Hetev (also spelled B’er Heteb) (Hebrew: באר היטב; "Explaining Well"), which comments briefly on the first three parts of the Shulchan Aruch ("Orach Chayim", "Yoreh De'ah", and "Even Ha'ezer"). A similar commentary on the fourth part of the Shulchan Aruch — that is, on the "Choshen Mishpat" — was written by Rabbi Moses Frankfurter, dayyan of Amsterdam. Ashkenazi's work was appended to the Shulchan Aruch in the editions of Amsterdam, 1753 and 1760, and went through many editions.
