= Joshua Höschel ben Joseph =

Polish rabbi

Joshua Höschel ben Joseph was a Polish rabbi born in Vilnius, Lithuania about 1578 and died in Kraków on August 16, 1648. In his boyhood, he journeyed to Przemyśl, Red Ruthenia, to study the Talmud under Rabbi Samuel ben Phoebus of Kraków. He returned to his native country and continued his Talmudic studies in the city of Włodzimierz (Volodymyr, Volhynia) under Rabbi Joshua Falk. After his marriage to the daughter of Rabbi Samuel of Brest-Litovsk, he became rabbi of the city of Grodno, whence he was called to the rabbinate of Tiktin (Tykocin), and later to that of Przemyśl. In 1639 he became rabbi of Lemberg (Lviv, Ukraine) and in the following year, he was appointed head of the yeshiva of Kraków. At Kraków, Joshua devoted all his time to matters pertaining to the yeshiva, din (law), and religious decisions. As he was a man of wealth, he accepted no salary for the services he rendered to the Jewish community of Kraków.

Joshua was one of the most eminent Talmudic analysts of his age. Like many of his learned contemporaries, Joshua had a taste also for the Kabbalah, but he did not allow mystical teachings to influence his halakhic decisions. On account of his extensive erudition in Talmudic literature, the number of his pupils at the yeshivah constantly increased. Many of them became noted rabbis. Among his students was Rav Shabbatai HaKohen (1621–1662), also known as The Shach, one of the greatest commentators on the Shulchan Aruch.

Joshua's published works are:

- Maginei Shelomo (Amsterdam, 1715), novellae on various tractates of the Talmud, in which the author attempts to refute the strictures made by the schools of the Tosafists on the commentaries of Rashi.
- She'elot uTeshuvot Penei Yehoshua', Amsterdam, 1715; Lemberg, 1860.
- Other works of his are still in manuscript.

== See also ==
- Judah Leib ben Isaac
