= Eisenstadt (surname) =

Eisenstadt is a German surname. Notable people with the surname include:

- Abraham Hirsch ben Jacob Eisenstadt of Byelostok (1812–1868), Russian rabbi
- Benjamin Eisenstadt (1906–1996), American inventor
- Debra Eisenstadt, American actress, writer, producer and director
- Harry Eisenstat, Major League baseball player
- Jill Eisenstadt (born 1963), American novelist
- Martin Eisenstadt, fictional "talking head" created by Dan Mirvish and Eitan Gorlin
- Meir Eisenstadt (1670–1744), Polish-German rabbi
- Mordechai Eisenstadt, Jewish Sabbatean
- Oona Eisenstadt, American religious studies professor
- Pauline Eisenstadt (1939–2024), American politician
- Samuel Eisenstadt (1923–2010), research chairman at Value Line
- Shmuel Eisenstadt (1923–2010), Israeli sociologist
