= Avraham Gombiner =

Polish rabbi (c.1635–1682)

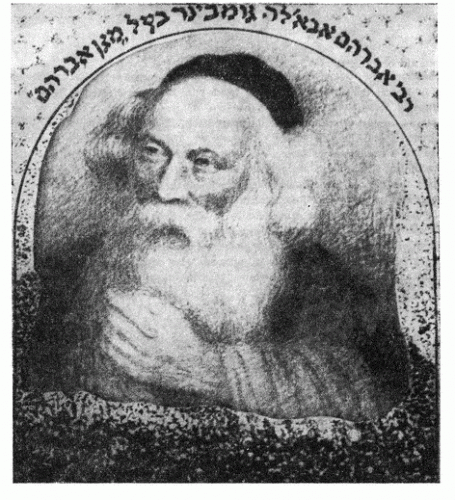
Rabbi Abraham Abele Gombiner

Abraham Abele Gombiner (Note: Gombiner's full name was Avraham Abele ben Chaim HaLevi.) (Hebrew: אברהם אבלי הלוי גומבינר; b. c. 1635 – 5 October 1682), commonly known as the Magen Avraham, born in Gąbin (Gombin), Poland, was a rabbi, Talmudist , and a leading religious authority in the Jewish community of Kalisz, Poland, during the seventeenth century. There are texts that list his family name as "Kalisz", after the city of his residence. (Note: Some accounts of his life confuse the town of Gombine, Russia, with a similarly named town in Prussia. The Russian town is correct.) After his parents were killed in 1655 during the aftermath of the Khmelnytsky Uprising of 1648, he moved to live and study with his relative in Leszno, Jacob Isaac Gombiner. From there, he moved to Kalisz, where he was appointed rosh yeshiva (רֹאשׁ יְשִׁיבָה, rōʾš yəšîbâ, 'head-of-academy') and judge in the tribunal of Rabbi Yisrael Spira, the son of Rabbi Nathan Nata Spira.

Scholars of Judaism know him for his Magen Avraham (מָגֵן אַבְרָהָם, māgēn ʾabrāhām, 'shield of Abraham'), a commentary on the Orach Chayim ([/ˈoʁaχ χaˈjim/]; אֹרַח חַיִּים, ʾōraḥ ḥayyîm, 'way of life') section of Rabbi Joseph Karo's Shulchan Aruch ([/ʃulˈχan aˈʁuχ/]; שֻׁלְחָן עָרוּךְ, šulḥān ʿārûḵ, 'set table') that he began writing in 1665 and finished in 1671. His brother Yehudah traveled to Amsterdam in 1673 to print the work but lacked the funds and died on the journey. It was not published until 1692 by Shabbethai Bass in Dyhernfurth after Gombiner's death. His son Chaim wrote in the preface to the work that his father was frequently sick and suffered pain and discomfort.

== Works ==
Gombiner wrote Magen Avraham, one of the two principal commentaries on the Orach Chayim section of the Shulchan Aruch. It should not be confused with the works of the same title by Abraham Farissol and Avraham, the maggid of Trisk. He also wrote Zayit Ra'anan, a commentary on the midrashic anthology Yalkut Shimoni, and a commentary on the Tosefta's treatment of Order Nezikin. The latter was published in 1732 by his grandson, together with Lehem Hapanim, a work by Gombiner's son-in-law, Moshe Yekutiel Kaufman. Gombiner also composed a commentary on the Torah entitled Shemen Sason, much of which has been lost.

== Magen Avraham ==
=== Debate over name of the book ===
Gombiner's son Chaim named the book Magen Avraham, using his father's name in the title. His father's students mentioned to him that they asked his father how he will name his book and he answered Ner Yisrael ("Lamp of Israel") (abbreviation: נר יפה של רבי אברהם הלוי) . Apparently, because of humility he did not want to integrate his name in the book. However, his son wanted to perpetuate his father's name in the title by linking it to the commentary of the Taz - Magen David, so he published his father's work under the title Magen Avraham.

Aaron Worms criticized him for titling the book with a traditional title for God and referencing the closing of the first blessing in the Amidah. However, Chaim Michael states that there is no basis for his critique and that it is all empty talk.

=== Halakhah, minhag, custom ===
Gombiner's innovative approach to commenting on the Shulchan Aruch was to incorporate the customs of his contemporary Poland. The work is terse and difficult and needed explanation by later commentators. His lasting effect on halakhah was the incorporation of the Kabbalistic customs of Safed, especially those found in Rabbi Isaiah Horowitz's Shene Luhot Haberit.

He taught that customs should be respected. In the case of the blessing of "giving strength to the weary" he writes that one does not undo an old custom, and believed that opponents like Rabbi Yosef Karo likely repented of changing minhag at the end of his life.

Dealing with the widespread practice of hiring gentiles to work for the community on the Sabbath, he wrote, "they allow themselves to hire a Gentile under contract to remove the garbage from the streets, and the Gentile does the work on the Sabbath." He assumed that a prior rabbi had approved the action "and we must conclude that a great rabbi handed down this ruling" for the sake of the community.

Regarding the universal practice of not giving people who claim to be Kohanim priority in many cases (such as not taking food first) he said it is most likely because modern-day Kohanim do not have any proper proof of their pedigree.

He taught that aliyot should be given based on events in congregants' lives, such as marriage, birth, and death, rather than always giving it to the scholars.

He taught that "women are exempt from counting the omer, since it is a positive time-bound commandment. Nonetheless, they have already made it obligatory upon themselves."

He held that one child can count for a minyan for the Torah reading. Some modern rabbis wish to extrapolate from this opinion to include counting women for a minyan in a Partnership Minyan, while others disagree. This controversial point is discussed in recent responsa.

While usually giving his imprimatur to local customs, in the case of the custom to donate firecrackers and fireworks to the synagogue in honour of Simchat Torah, Rabbi Gombiner believed it proof of the effect of allowing boorish commoners to celebrate a scholars' holiday.

=== Influence ===
The Magen Avraham was the subject of a commentary by Samuel Neta HaLevi of Kolin, entitled Mahatsit ha-shekel, and another by David Solomon Eibeschutz, entitled Levushei Serad.

Yechiel Michel Epstein’s Aruch HaShulchan and Yisrael Meir Kagan’s Mishnah Berurah relied on Gombiner for their acceptance of Kabbalistic practices.

There is a major dispute in the 17-18th century as to how to calculate the relative hours of the day for Jewish rituals. One approach (that of Gombiner, in his Magen Avraham) reckons the day from dawn until nightfall. The other approach (that of the Vilna Gaon) reckons the day from sunrise to sunset. For morning rituals, Magen Avraham's calculations are earlier than that of the Vilna Gaon; while for afternoon rituals, they are later.

Magen Avraham is notable as being the first work to bring the kabbalistic traditions of the Arizal into the mainstream of halachic discussion.

== Notable Descendants ==
- Rabbi Chaim Pinchas Lubinsky
- Shlomo Zemach

== Bibliography ==
- Jacob, Katz The "Shabbes Goy": A Study in Halakhic Flexibility Jewish Publication Society, 1989
- Chayyim Tchernowitz, Toldot Haposkim 3: 164-172 (in He).
- J. Wrescher, Introduction to Shemen Sason (2000).
