= Zechariah Mendel ben Aryeh Leib =

Zechariah Mendel ben Aryeh Leib (died c. 1706) (Hebrew: זכריה מנדל בן אריה ליב) was a Polish Talmudist, native of Kraków. In 1689 he became chief rabbi and head of the yeshivah at Belz, Galicia.

He was the author of Be'er Heitev, a well-known commentary on the Shulchan Aruch, Yoreh De'ah, and Ḥoshen Mishpaṭ (first edition of the first part, Amsterdam, 1754; of the second, ib. 1764); the work is principally a compendium of the Sifte Kohen and Ṭure Zahav.

His descendants include Rebbetzin Malka Rokeach of Belz.
