= Akhiyahu HaKohen =

Ahijah Ha-Kohen (אחיהו הכהן) (fl. 910 CE) was a rabbi and Hebrew-language grammarian in Tiberias. He is mentioned in a genizah fragment of the Geonim era. for his teaching of proper dikduk grammar and taamim cantillation marks of the Hebrew language Torah text.

Eli ben Yehudah ha-Nazir (also fl.910 Tiberias) mentions Ahijah Ha-Kohen's opinion of the dagesh pronunciation of the Hebrew letter resh as articulated by the mesorah masters of Tiberias. He is likewise referenced in the Hebrew grammar book Binyan Shlomo (Hebrew: בנין שלמה) of Solomon Hanau (1687–1746).
