= Malachi ben Jacob HaKohen =

Malachi ben Jacob ha-Kohen (also known as the Yad Malachi) Montefoscoli (1695/1700? – 1772) was a renowned Talmudist, methodologist, and one of the greatest Kabbalists of the 18th century. He was a student of the famous kabbalist Rabbi Joseph Ergas, author of the original kabbalistic text known as Shomer Emunim. Born in Livorno sometime between 1695 and 1700, he died in the year 1772 and is considered the last of the great rabbinical authorities of Italy. Praised effusively by his contemporaries and quoted frequently by major halakhic authorities of the 18th and 19th centuries, he served as Rabbi of Livorno, Italy, and apparently lived to an old age. A decision by him, dated Nisan, 1732, and referring to a civil case at Rome, is included in the responsa of Rabbi Isaiah Bassani of Reggio (Todat Shelamim, No. 11, 1741). During the controversy between Jonathan Eybeschutz and Jacob Emden he sided with the former (letter of the rabbinate of Leghorn in "Luḥot 'Edut," p. 22).

He is most famous for his Yad Mal'aki (1766-7), a methodological work and compilation in three parts: part one contains an alphabetical list of all the rules and technical terms found in the Talmud, with explanations; part two deals with rules regarding the codifiers; part three deals with the rules relating to legal decisions, explaining certain general principles of legal responsa. Malachi wrote also a liturgical work, Shibḥe Todah (1744), containing prayers for the 22d of Shebaṭ, a fast-day instituted by the community of Leghorn. In addition to these, Malachi also wrote a Sefer Torah in his own hand which then became an authoritative reference for many details regarding the correct formation of various Hebrew letters.

== Yad Malachi ==
His major work, the 'Yad Malachi', first printed in Livorno (1766), and later Berlin (1857), was praised by his contemporaries as well as halakhic authorities of later generations. Rabbi Yitzchak Shmelkes wrote that: "Every reader of this book will be amazed by the way this living lion, the high priest.....dives in the mighty waters, the sea of the Talmud. No secret is hidden from him", while Rabbi Chaim Joseph David Azulai (the 'Chida') wrote: "And after much time, the sun shone upon the land.... with the precious book 'Yad Malachi', and as the eyes of servants to the hand of their masters, I have raised my eyes and seen..." The 'Yad Malachi' was printed again in the late 20th century, and a new edition with greatly improved fonts, format, and biographical detail was printed in Israel in 2001. In 2016, Machon Yerushalayim published a critical edition with new typesetting and annotations cross-referencing parallel discussions in other "Klalim" works and highlighting discussions of the author's writing in later works. A third volume containing the author's commentary on the Torah, responsa, and poetry, was published in 2018.

== Bibliography ==
- 'Benjamin Brown, "Some Say This, Some Say That": Pragmatics and Discourse Markers in Yad Malachi's Interpretation Rules'
- Azulai, Shem ha-Gedolim, i.63;
- Moritz Steinschneider, Cat. Bodl. col. 1644.
