= Moses ben Isaac Judah Lima =

Moses ben Isaac Judah Lima (c. 1615 – c. 1670) was a Lithuanian rabbinical scholar, one of the Acharonim.

When a comparatively young man he successively occupied the rabbinates of Brest-Litovsk and Slonim. His fame as a scholar soon reached Vilna, whither he was called, in 1650, to fill the office of chief rabbi. Lima was of a retiring and diffident disposition, which probably accounts for the paucity of his writings. He left a manuscript commentary on Shulchan Aruch, Eben Ha-Ezer, which his son Raphael published (1670) under the title of Ḥelḳat Meḥoḳeḳ, and which, while betraying profound erudition, was so condensed that the editor deemed it necessary to provide it with explanatory notes. Lima did not carry even this work to completion; it covers only the first 126 chapters of the Eben Ha-Ezer.

== Bibliography ==
- Goldworm, H. (1989). The Early Acharonim: Biographical Sketches of the Prominent Early Rabbinic Sages and Leaders from the Fifteenth — Seventeenth Centuries. New York: Mesorah Publications.

== Jewish Encyclopedia bibliography ==
- Azulai, Shem ha-Gedolim, i. and ii., s.v. Ḥelḳat Meḥoḳeḳ;
- S. Bäck, in Winter and Wünsche, Die Jüdische Litteratur, ii. 519;
- Gans, Ẓemaḥ Dawid, p. 596;
- Grätz, Gesch. x. 61 et seq.;
- Isaak Markus Jost: Geschichte des Judenthums und seiner Sekten, Leipzig, Dörffling und Franke, 1857, iii. 244.
