= Shabbatai HaKohen =

17th-century talmudist and halakhist

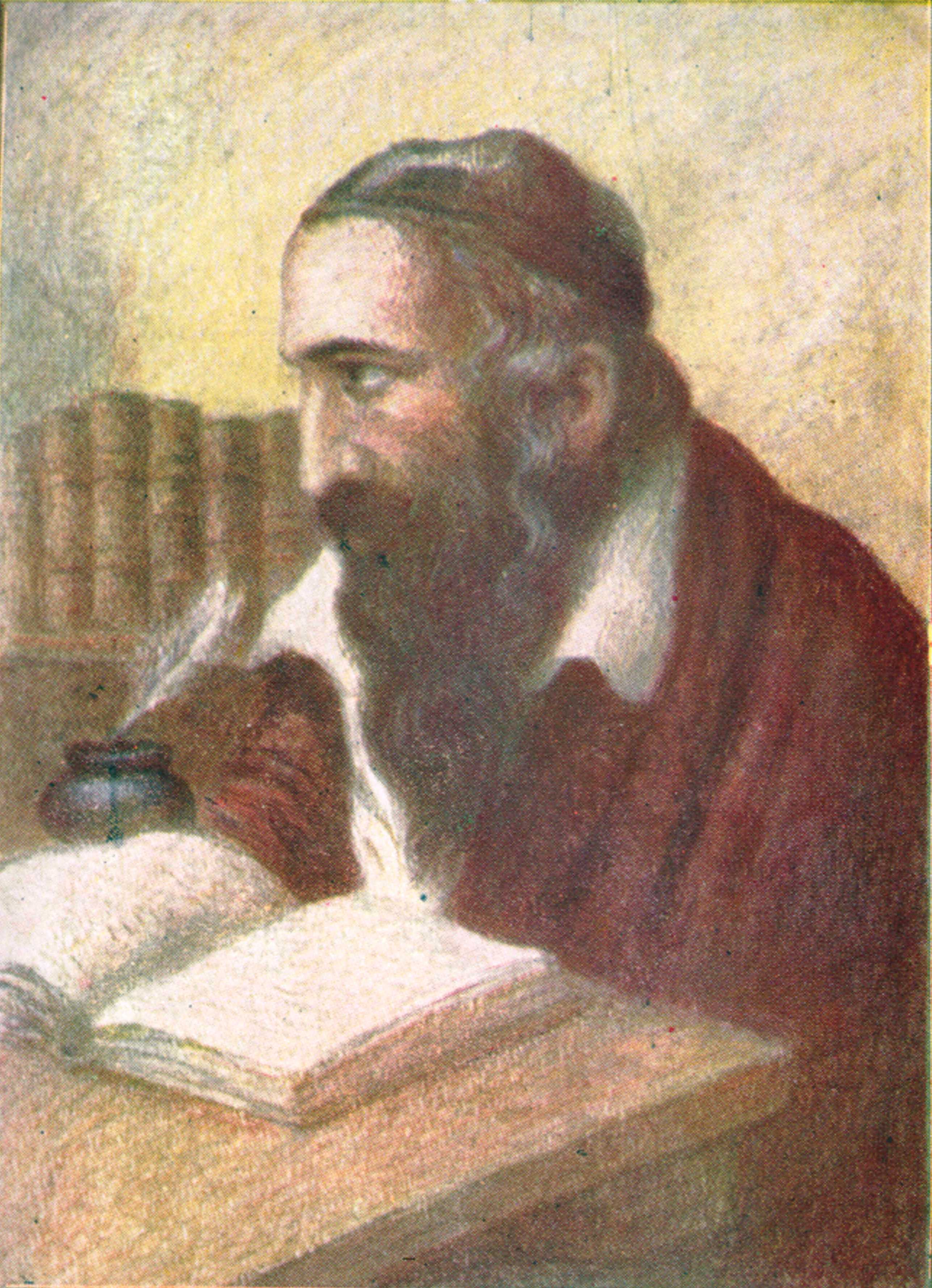
Shabbatai HaKohen

Shabbatai (Note: also Shabbetai, Shabbtai, Shabtai. See Shabtai (given name).) ben Meir HaKohen (Hebrew: שבתי בן מאיר הכהן; 1621–1662) was a talmudist and halakhist. He became known as the Shakh (Hebrew: ש"ך), which is an abbreviation of his most important work, Siftei Kohen (Hebrew: שפתי כהן, lit. 'Lips of the Priest') on the Shulchan Aruch.

== Biography ==
Shabbatai HaKohen was born either in Amstibovo or in Wilno, Lithuania, in 1621 and died in Holešov, Moravia, on the 1st of Adar, 1662. He first studied with his father Meir HaKohen and in 1633 he entered the yeshivah of Joshua Höschel ben Joseph at Tykotzin, moving later to Kraków and Lublin, where he studied under Naphtali Cohen. He also studied under Ya'acov ben Ephraim Hersch, Av Beis Din of Lublin and Brisk, and the Rosh Yeshiva of the latter.

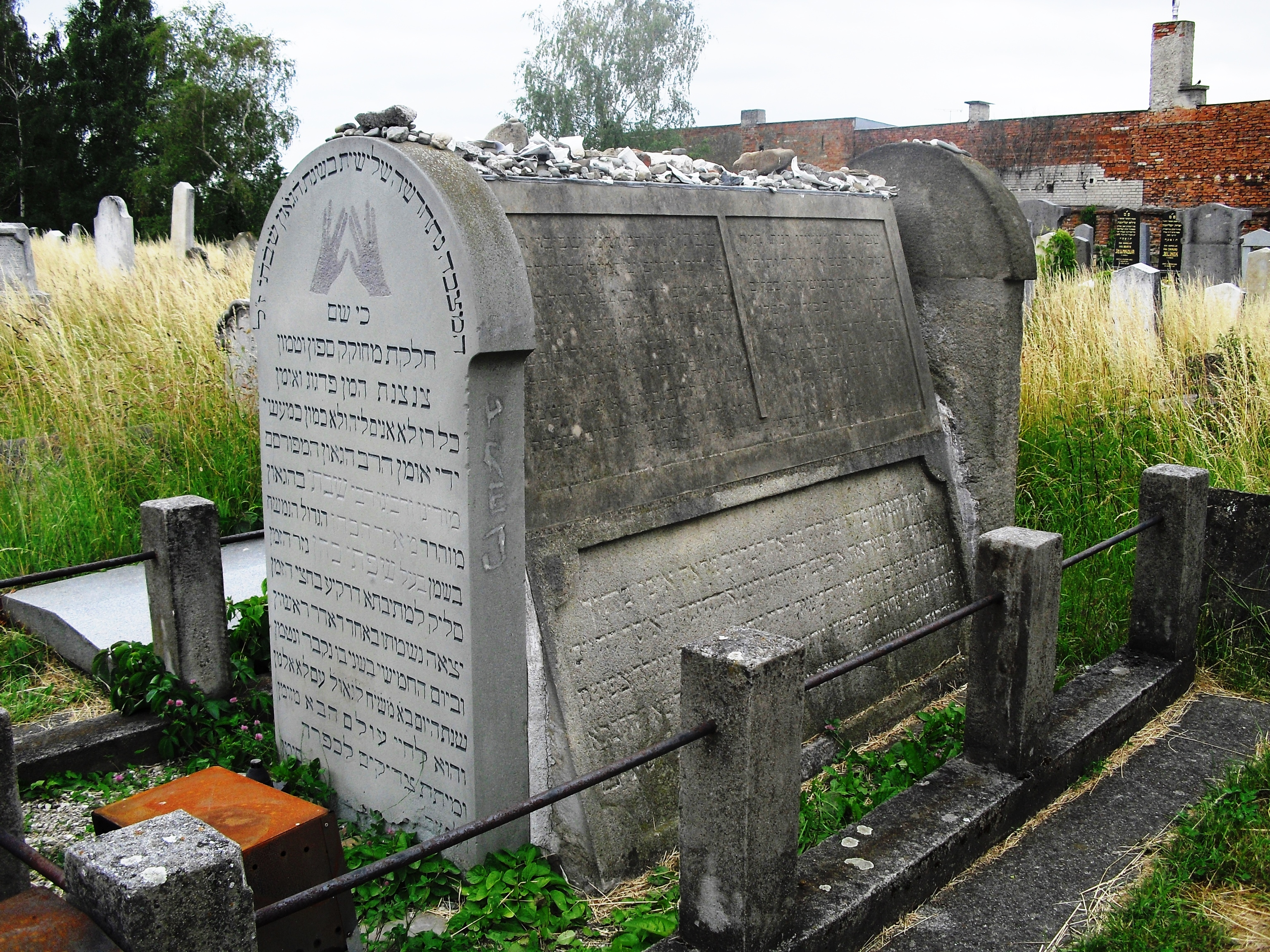
Tomb of Sabbatai ben Meir ha-Kohen in Holešov

Returning to Wilno, he married the daughter of the wealthy Shimon Wolf, a great-grandson of Moses Isserles, and shortly after was appointed to the Beit Din as one of the assistants of Moses ben Isaac Judah Lima, author of Chelkat Mechokek. In 1655, during fighting between Polish forces and the invading Swedish army in the Northern War, Shabbatai HaKohen fled Wilno with the entire Jewish community. After a short stay at Lublin he went to Prague and later to Strážnice in Moravia, from where he was called to the rabbinate of Holešov, where he remained until his death in 1662. While in Holešov, he gained the friendship of Magister Valentino Wiedreich of Leipzig. The Shakh's grave in the Jewish cemetery of Holešov still exists and is visited by people from all over the world. A portion of his descendants have taken the last name Hakohen Rubin, although their reasons for doing so are unknown.

== Works ==
=== The "Shakh" ===
In Kraków in 1646, he published his magnum opus, the Siftei Kohen (Hebrew: שפתי כהן) or the Shakh (Hebrew: ש"ך), a commentary on the Shulchan Aruch Choshen Mishpat. This work was approved by the greatest Polish and Lithuanian scholars and since 1674 has been published in most editions of the Yoreh De'ah.

Shabbatai HaKohen was regarded by his contemporaries as more than usually learned. He frequently contested the decisions of his predecessors, and followed an entirely new path in the interpretation of the Talmudic law. He made light, too, of the decisions of his contemporaries, and thus drew on himself the enmity of some among them, including David ben Shmuel HaLevi, author of Ture Zahav, and Aaron Shmuel Kaidanover, author of Birkhat HaZevach, who was the father-in-law of his brother Yonah Menachem Nachum HaKohen. Nevertheless, Sifsei/Siftei/Sifte Kohen, Shakh's commentary on the Shulchan Aruch, was considered by a majority of Talmudists as of the highest authority, and they applied his decisions to actual cases as the final word of the Law. As a logician he stood, perhaps, first among the Talmudic scholars of his age.

=== Other writings ===
In addition to his knowledge of the Talmudic law he was versed in the Kabbala, which he used in explaining various passages of the Bible. His mastery of Hebrew is evidenced by the selichot that he composed in commemoration of the Chmielnicki tragedies. In 1648 the communities of the Polish Kingdom were devastated by Chmielnicki, Shabbatai HaKohen portrayed the persecutions of the Jews in his Megillat Efah.

On the same day 1,500 people were killed in the city of Uman in Russia on the Sabbath. The nobles Cossacks with whom the wicked mob had again made an alliance chased all the Jews from the city into the fields and vineyards where the villains surrounded them in a circle, stripped them to their skin and ordered them to lie on the ground. The villains spoke to the Jews with friendly and consoling words: 'Why do you want to be killed, strangled and slaughtered like an offering to your God Who poured out His anger upon you without mercy? Would it not be safer for you to worship our gods, our images and crosses and we would form one people which would unite together.' "But the holy and faithful people who so often allowed themselves to be murdered for the sake of the Lord, raised their voices together to the Almighty in Heaven and cried: 'Hear o Israel the Lord our God, the Holy One and the King of the Universe, we have been murdered for Thy sake so often already. O Lord God of Israel let us remain faithful to Thee.' Afterward they recited the confession of sins and said: 'We are guilty and thus recognize the Divine judgment.' Now the villains turned upon them and there was not one of them who did not fall victim.

== Shakh Synagogue ==
A Synagogue in Holešov is called Shakh Synagogue after Shabbatai HaKohen. It was built in the late 16th century, after the former synagogue had burned down in 1560. In the early 17th century the synagogue was enlarged with a sidehall and a women's gallery. Between 1725 and 1737 the interior was designed in a baroque decoration in the so-called "Polish style". The synagogue is an isolated plain building. It has a rectangular ground plan. In the eastern side of the main hall is the Aron Kodesh, built in the baroque altar style. In the centre of the hall is the bimah, built as an octagonal platform with a metal railing. Some parts of the walls and the vault are decorated with ornamental paintings with herbal and faunal motifs and Hebrew texts. The sidehall is separated from the main hall by two arcades. On the first floor there is the women's gallery, decorated with liturgical texts, and the second floor was used as a school. Today, the synagogue is a museum; both floors house the exhibition "The Jews in Moravia".

Interior of Shakh Synagogue

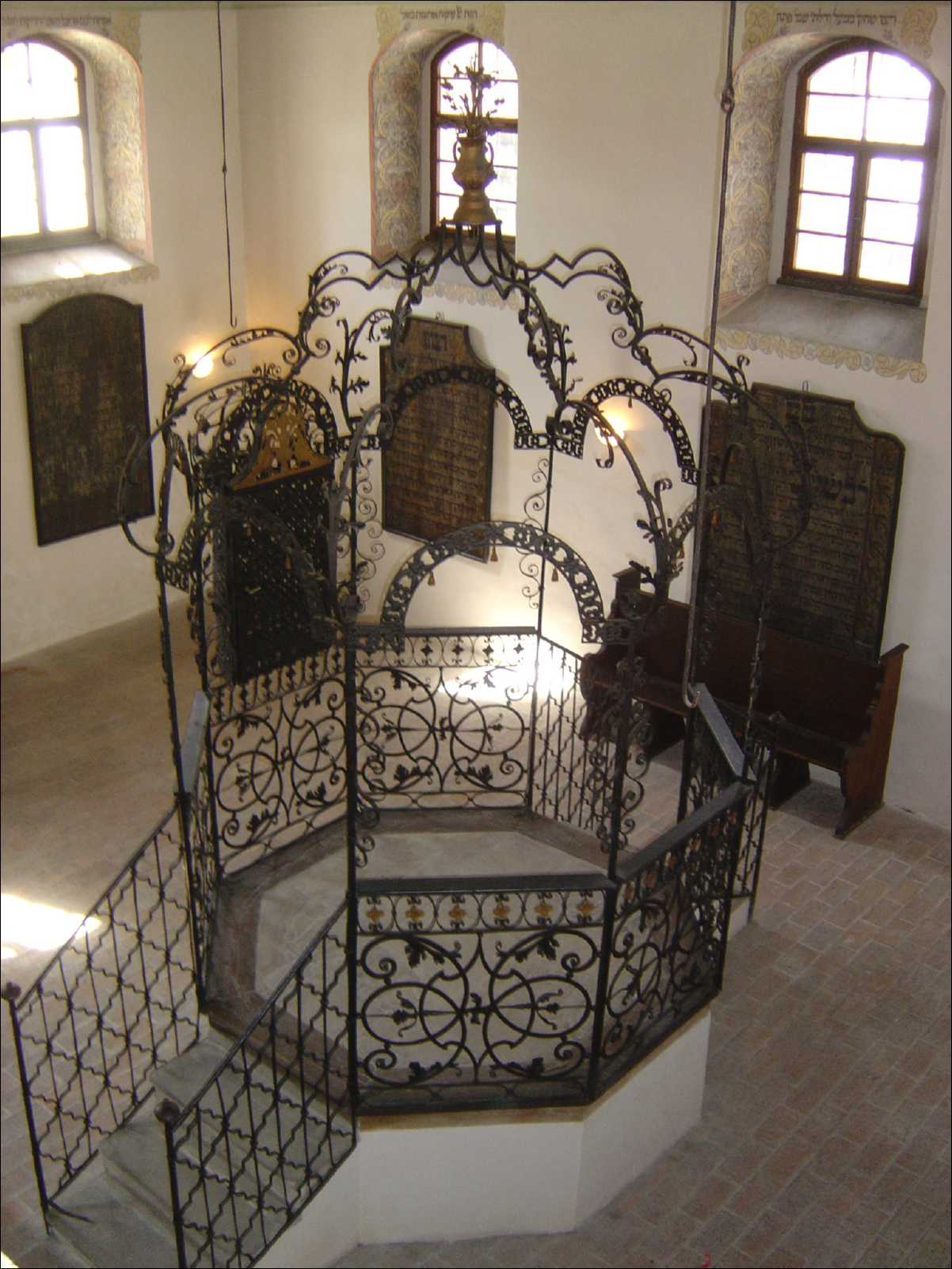
Almemor

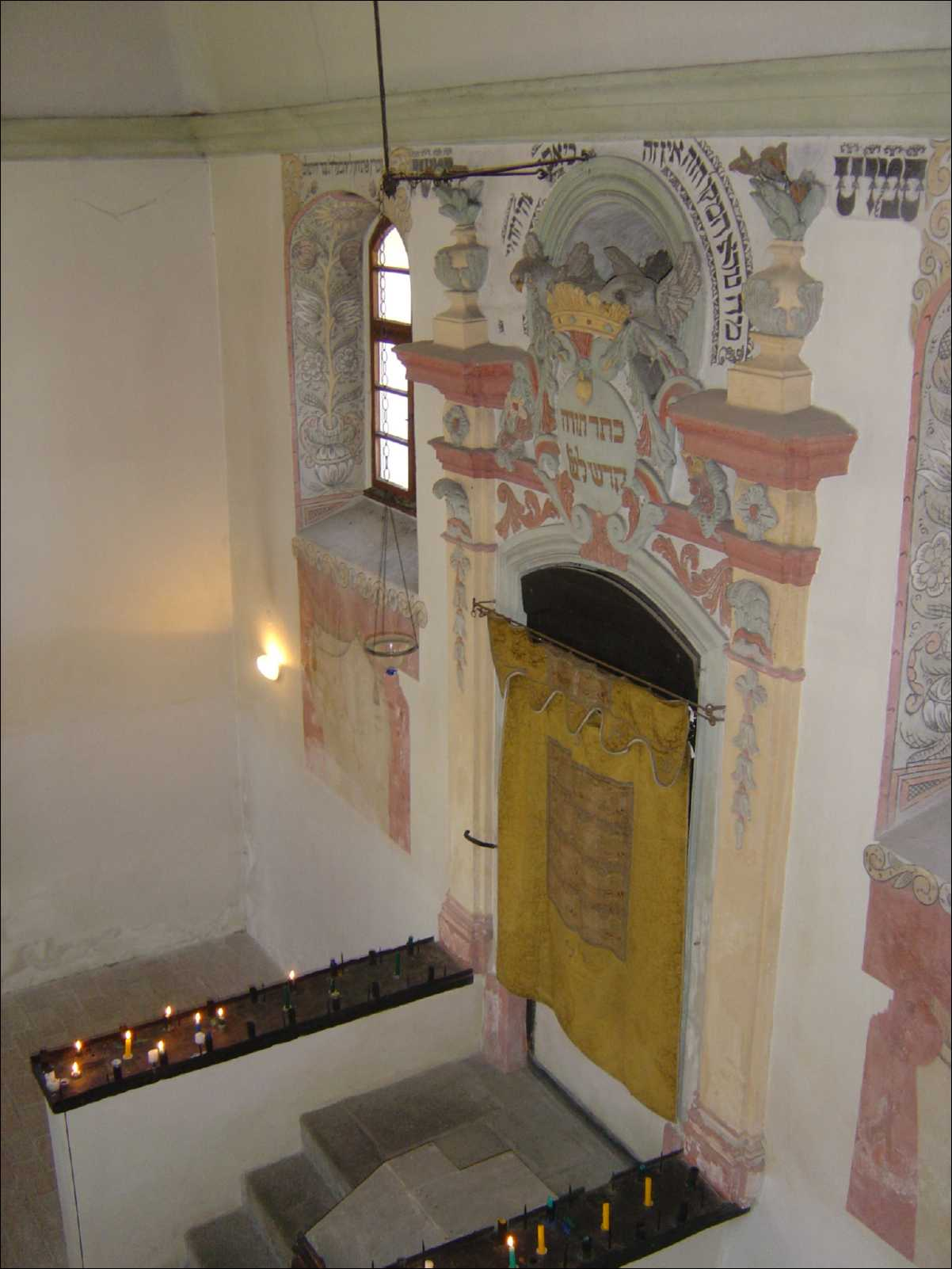
Aron Kodesh

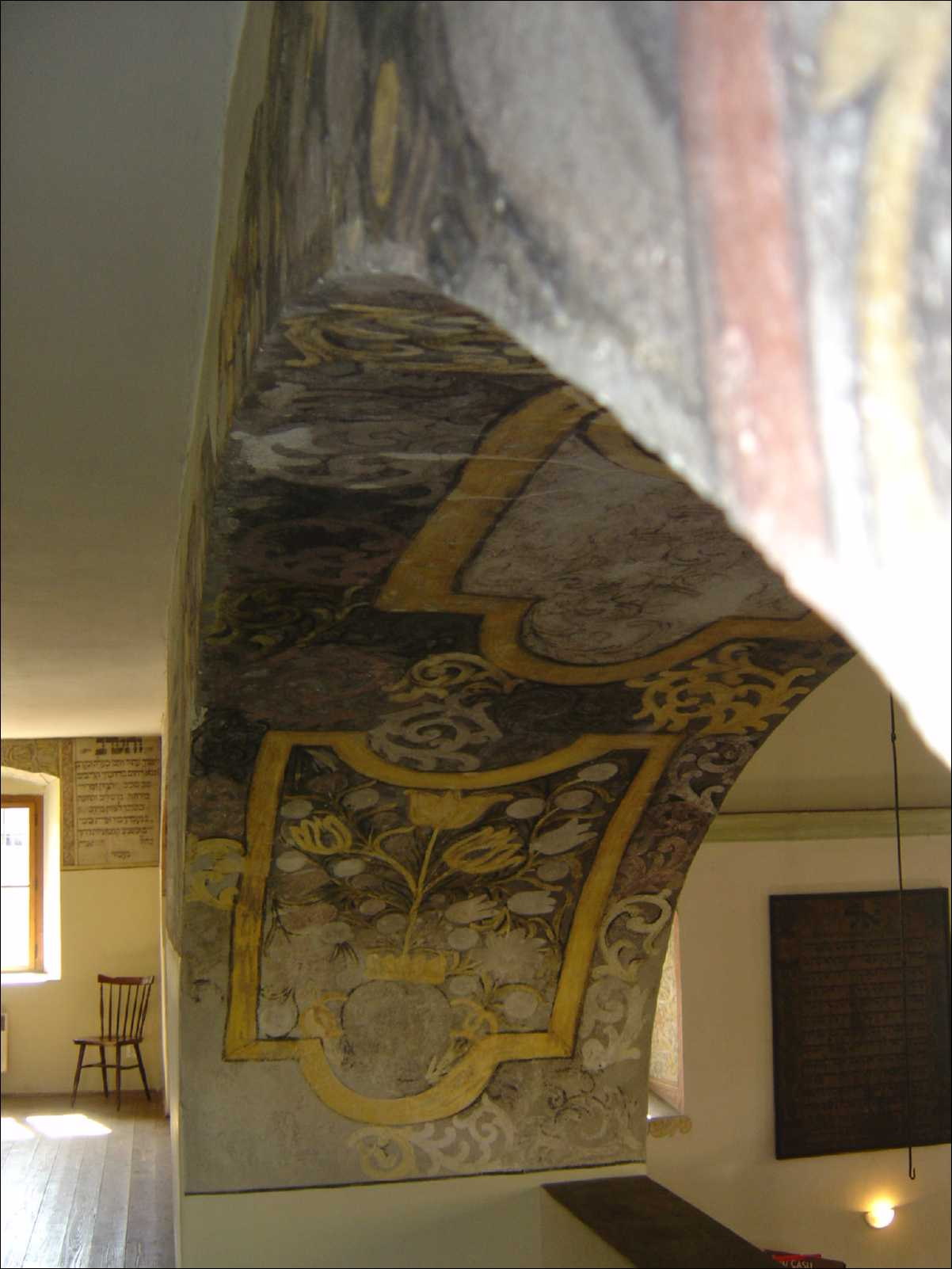
First floor

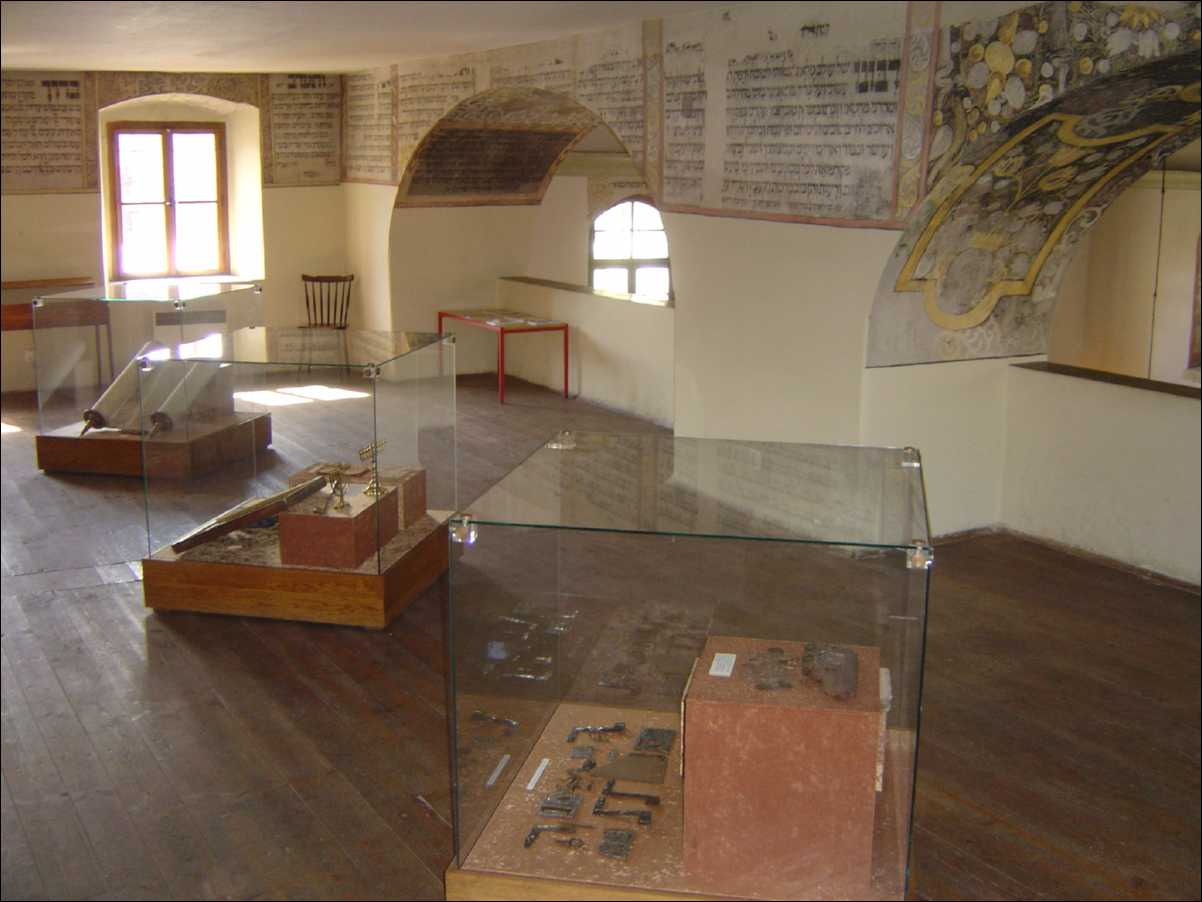
First floor

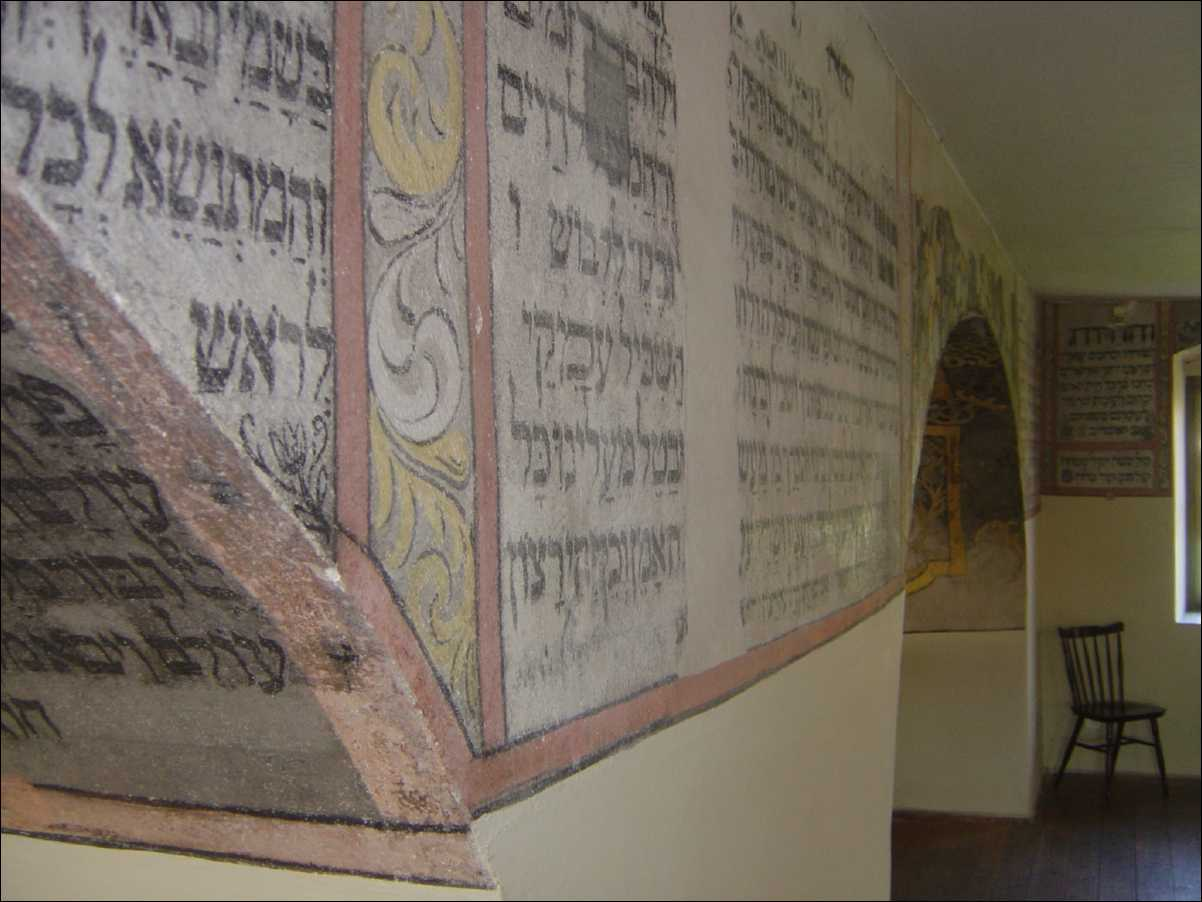
First floor

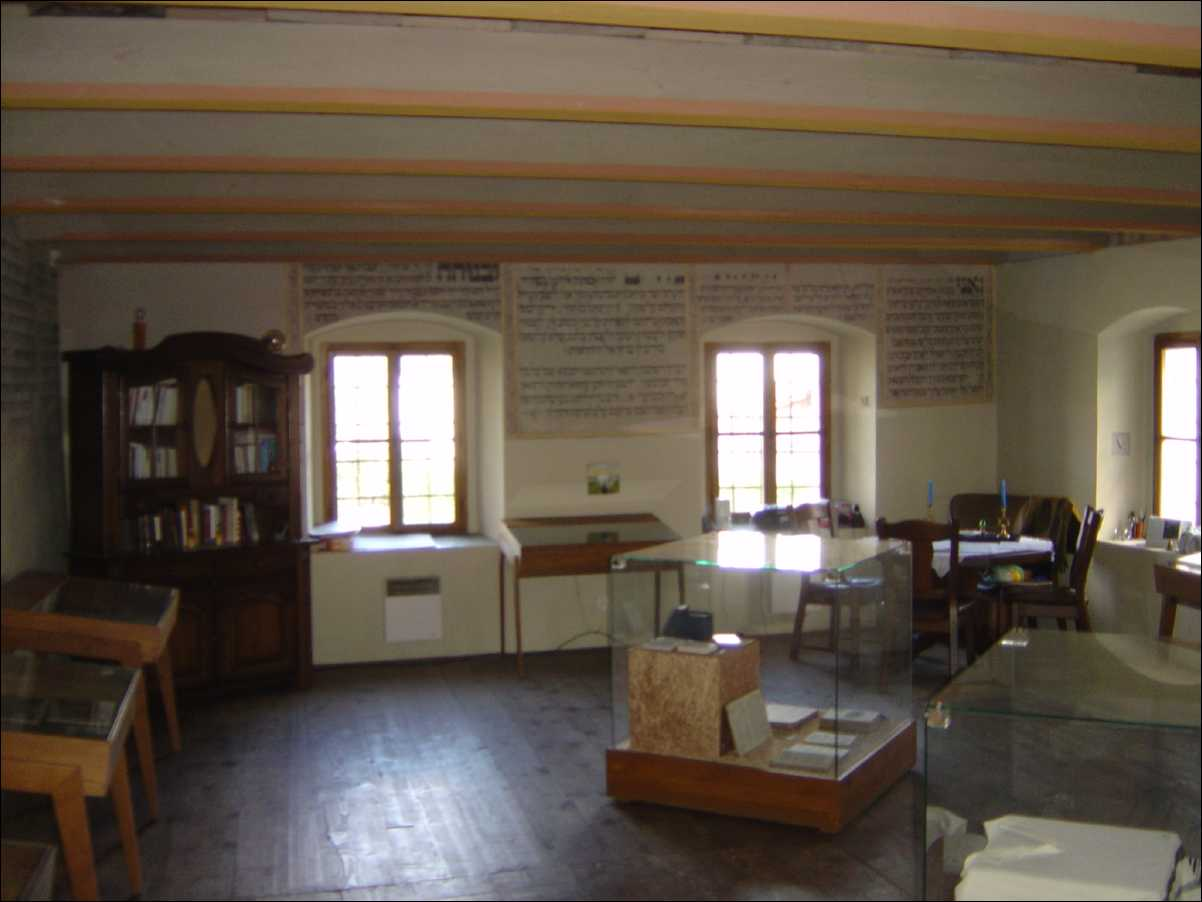
Second floor

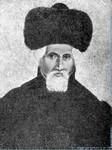
A common painting wrongly attributed to Shach (the figure is Haim Deutschman)

== Published works ==
- Megillat efah, selichot for the 20th of Sivan, in memory of those killed during the tragedy of 1648 (Amsterdam, 1651)
- Sifte Kohen, on Shulchan Aruch Choshen Mishpat (Amsterdam, 1667)
- He'Aruch, a commentary on the Yoreh De'ah section of the Tur (Berlin, 1667)
- Nekuddot HaKesef, criticism of the Ture Zahav of David b. Shmuel HaLevi (Frankfort-on-the-Oder, 1677)
- Tokpo Kohen (a pun on "tekafo kohen"), general laws concerning "teku", etc. (Frankfort-on-the-Oder, 1677)
- Gevurat Anashim, on section 154 of the Shulchan Aruch Even Ha'ezer (Dessau, 1697)
- Po'el Tzedek, an arrangement of the 613 commandments of Maimonides (Jessnitz, 1720)
- Derush Yakar, a discourse upon the passage Kammah Ma'a lot in the Haggadah (Presburg, 1840; abbreviation of Kerem Shlomo)

== See also ==
- Meisel family
