= David HaLevi Segal =

Polish Jewish rabbi

David ha-Levi Segal
- דוד הלוי סגל
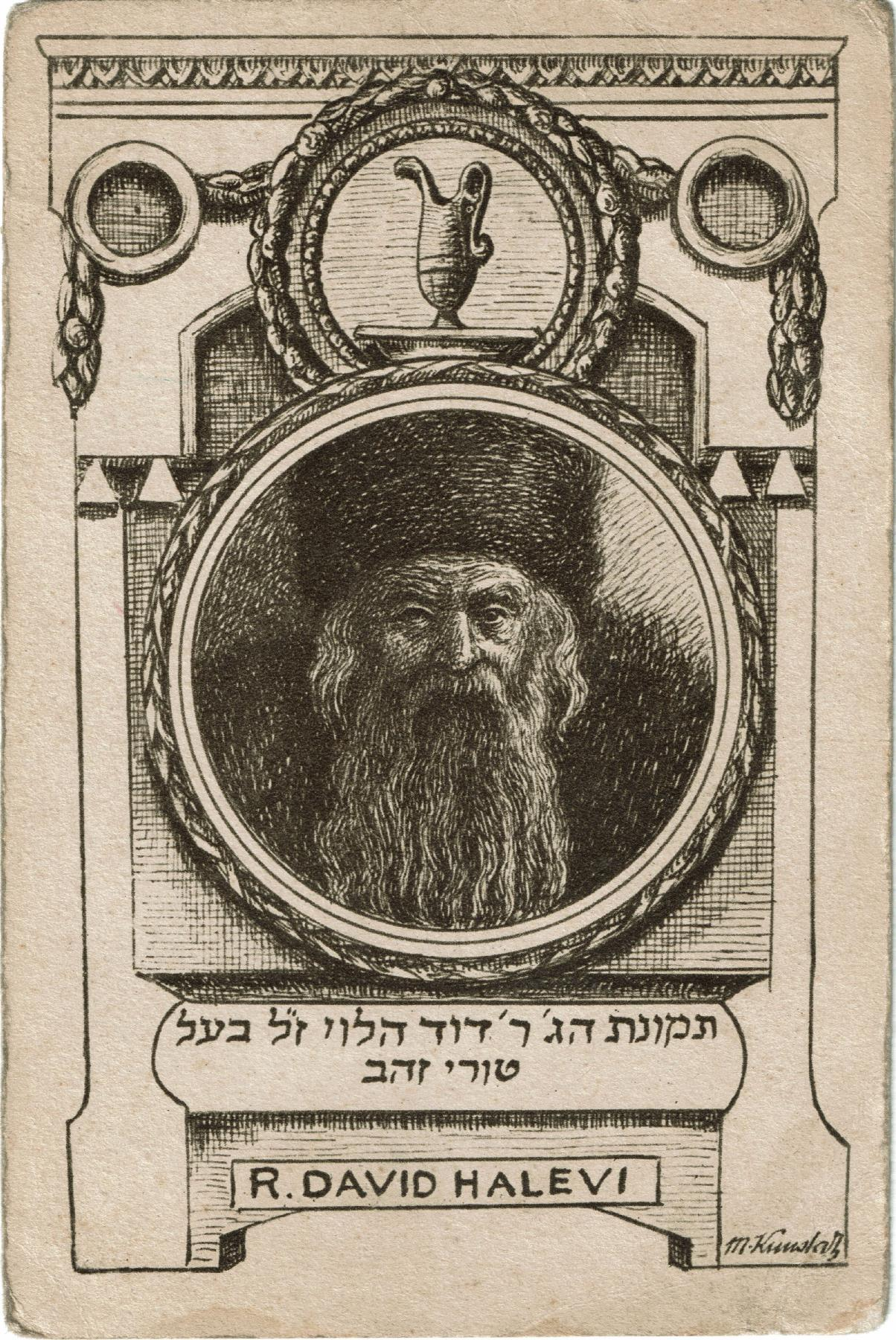
- Postcard of Segal by Meir Kunstadt, early 1900s.
- Born: 1586; Volodymyr, Polish–Lithuanian Commonwealth
- Died: February 20, 1667 (aged 80–81); Lviv, Polish–Lithuanian Commonwealth
- Resting place: Lviv, Polish–Lithuanian Commonwealth
- Other names: Turei Zahav (Taz)
- Known for: Posek
- Notable work: 'Turei Zahav' and 'Magen David'
- Title: Rabbi

David ha-Levi Segal (c. 1586 – 20 February 1667), also known as the Turei Zahav (abbreviated Taz [ט"ז]) after the title of his significant halakhic commentary on the Shulchan Aruch, was one of the greatest Polish rabbinical authorities.

== Biography ==
Born in Volodymir, Volhynia, Segal was the son of Samuel ha-Levi Segal. His chief Torah teacher was his older brother, Isaac HaLevi Segal. He became a reputed Talmudic scholar, and married the daughter of Rabbi Joel Sirkis of Brest who was also known as the Bach (ב"ח), and quoted his father-in-law frequently in his works. He was also a Mohel.

After residing with his father-in-law and continuing his Torah studies for several years, Segal and his family moved to Kraków. He was then appointed chief rabbi of Potelych (Polish: Potylicz), near Rava, where he lived in great poverty. Later he went to Poznań, where he remained for several years.

Around 1641 he became rabbi of the old community of Ostrog, (or Ostroh), in Volhynia. There Segal established a famous yeshiva, and was soon recognized as one of the great halakhic authorities of his time. In Ostrog, Segal wrote a commentary on Joseph Caro's Shulchan Aruch (Yoreh De'ah), which he published in Lublin in 1646. This commentary, known as the Turei Zahav ("Rows of Gold"), was accepted as one of the highest authorities on Jewish law. Thereafter, Segal became known by the acronym of his work, the TaZ.

Two years after the publication of his commentary, Segal and his family had to flee the massacres of the Cossack insurrection under Bogdan Chmielnicki in 1648–1649. Segal went to Uherský Brod, Moravia, where he remained for some time. Not happy in Moravia, he returned to Poland as soon as order was restored, settling in Lemberg, where he remained for the rest of his life.

In Lemberg, Segal was appointed Av Beit Din (head of the rabbinical court). When Rabbi Meïr Sack, chief rabbi of Lemberg, died in 1653, he succeeded him in this position as well.

Segal's last days were saddened by the death of his two sons, Mordechai and Solomon, who were killed in the riots occurring in Lemberg in the spring of 1664. His wife had died long before; now Segal married the widow of her brother, Samuel Hirz, Rav of Pińczów. His third son from his first marriage, Isaiah, and his stepson, Aryeh Löb, were the two Polish scholars who were sent—probably by Segal, or at least with his consent—to Turkey in 1666 to investigate the claims of the pseudo-Messiah, Shabbetai Tzvi. The two returned with a present for Segal from Shabbetai Tzvi — a white silk robe, along with a letter in which the latter promised to avenge the wrongs of the Jews of Poland.

Segal's descendants were the Russian rabbinical family Paltrowitch, which produced 33 rabbis over several generations.

== Works ==
Most of Segal's works were published long after his death. The Turei Zahav (טורי זהב - "Rows of Gold"), an indispensable commentary on Shulchan Aruch, was re-published by Shabbethai Bass in Dyhernfurth in 1692, this time together with the Magen Abraham by Abraham Abele Gumbiner. The title Turei Zahav is a play on the similar-sounding turei zahav (תורי זהב), "towers of gold", in Song of Songs 1:11. The title is abbreviated as Taz (ט"ז), and subtitled Magen David ("Shield of David", after Segal's first name) in many editions. Both commentaries (Taz and Magen Abraham), together with the main text, the Shulchan Aruch, were republished frequently with several other commentaries, and still hold first rank among halakhic authorities.

Two years before the publication of this work, Judel of Kovli, in Volhynia, a kabbalist and Talmudic scholar who wrote a commentary on Orach Chaim, gave money to have it published together with the Taz. His wishes were never carried out, and his money was used to publish another of Segal's works, Divrei David ("The Words of David"), a supercommentary on Rashi (Dyhernfurth, 1690). Part of the Taz on Shulchan Aruch (Chosen Mishpat, to chapter 296), appeared separately in Hamburg in the same year, with notes by Tzvi Ashkenazi. The other half, in spite of various attempts and general demand, did not appear until about seventy years later (Berlin, 1761). The Taz on Shulchan Aruch (Even ha-Ezer), which was utilized in manuscript by Samuel ben Phoebus, the author of Bet Shemuel on the same part of the Shulchan Aruch, was first printed in Zolkiev in 1754.

Segal also authored responsa which, though sometimes quoted from the manuscripts, were never published. He and Shabbethai Kohen (the ShaKh) are among the greatest halakhic authorities among the Acharonim. In 1683, the Council of Four Lands declared that the authority of the Taz should be considered greater than that of the ShaKh, but later the ShaKh gained more and more in authority.

== See also ==
- Golden Rose Synagogue (Lviv)
