= Ba'er Hetev =

Commentary on the Code of Jewish Law

Ba'er Hetev (also B’er Heteb or Ba'er Heiteiv; Hebrew: באר היטב lit. "explaining well" or "explained well", based on Deut. 27:8; the vocalization "Be'er" is a traditional alternative) is a Hebrew commentary on the Shulchan Aruch, the chief codification of Jewish law. The commentary's two halves were authored by different individuals.

On the sections of Orach Chaim and Even HaEzer, the commentary was written by Yehudah ben Shimon Ashkenazi (d. 1743), rabbi of Tykocin, Poland.

On the sections of Choshen Mishpat and Yoreh De'ah, the commentary was written by Zechariah Mendel ben Aryeh Leib, a Polish rabbi who lived in the 17th and 18th centuries.
