= Samuel ben Uri Shraga Phoebus =

Polish rabbi (1625 or 1650 – 1706)

Samuel ben Uri Shraga Phoebus (Hebrew: שמואל בן אורי שרגא פיביש; c. 1625 or 1650 – 1706), alternatively "Or Shraga", "Faivish", "Fayvish," or "Faibesh", was a Polish rabbi and Talmudist of Woydyslaw in the second half of the 17th century. In his early youth, he was a pupil of Rabbi Heshel in Kraków, and on the latter's death he continued his studies under Heshel's successor, Rabbi Leib Fischeles, whose daughter he married.

Samuel officiated as rabbi in Shydlow, Poland, whence he was called in September 1691 to the rabbinate of Fürth, Germany. In his new office, he displayed great activity, and was the recipient of a good income; nevertheless his new surroundings were distasteful to him. The reason is not known; but it is recorded that he longed for his former rabbinate. In 1694, he received a call to return to Shydlow, which he soon accepted, as appears from his approbation of the work Ir Binyamin (Frankfort-on-the-Oder, 1698), in which he is mentioned as rabbi of the Polish town.

Samuel wrote in Hebrew a clear and comprehensive commentary, known as Beit Shmuel, on the Eben ha'Ezer section of the Shulhan Aruk; the commentary appeared in Dyhernfurth in 1689, being the first Hebrew work printed there. Later, he thoroughly revised it, and a second edition, with several emendations and additions, appeared at Fürth in 1694. He also wrote several responsa and opinions, one of which is published in Ḥinnuk Bet Yehudah, No. 131 (Frankfurt, 1705).

His daughter married Rabbi Aaron Hart, the first chief rabbi of Great Britain.
