= Shulchan Aruch =

Book of Jewish law by Rabbi Joseph Karo

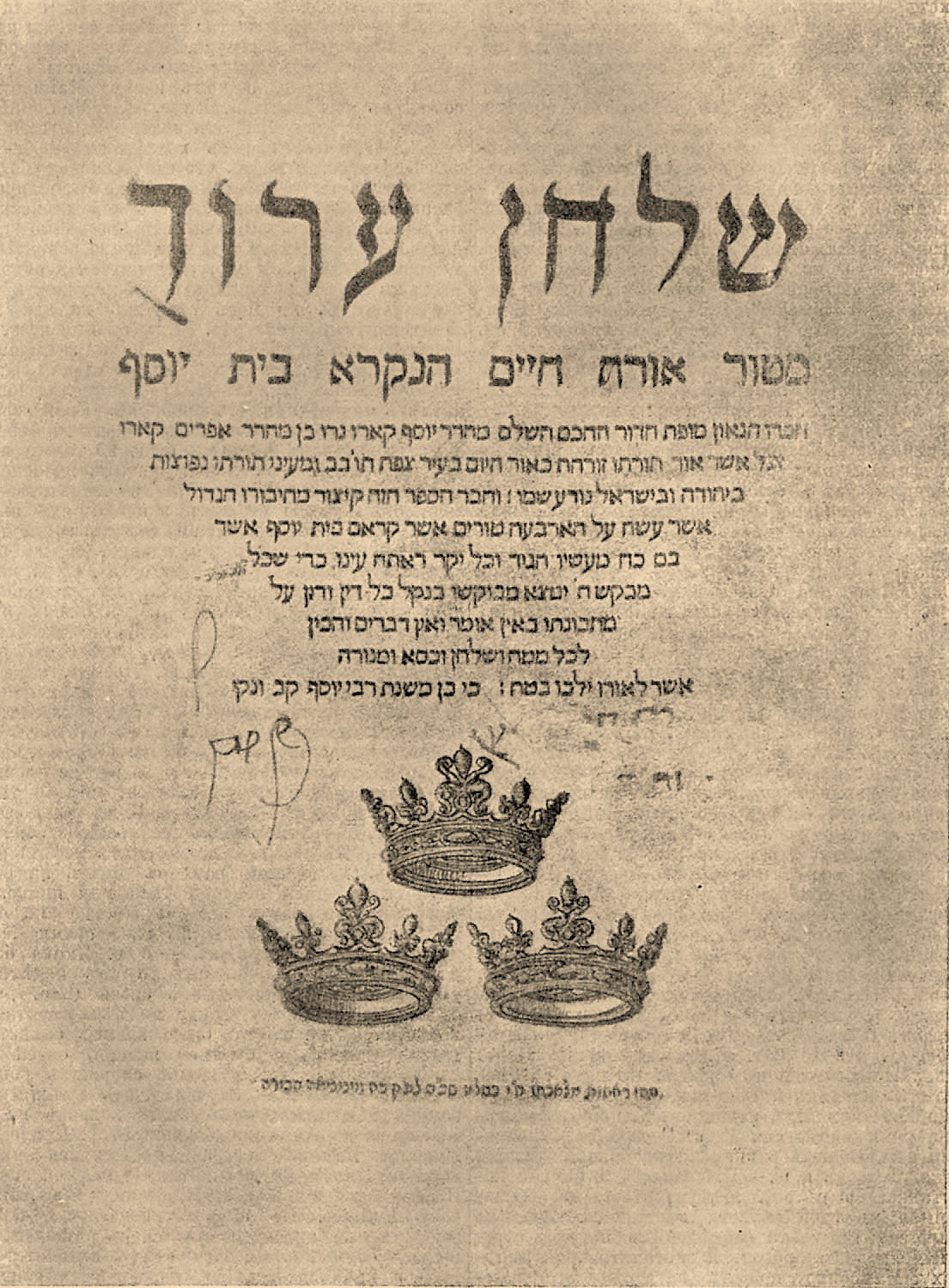
- Author: Joseph Karo
- Language: Hebrew
- Subject: Halakha
- Publication date: 1565
- Publication place: Venice
- Preceded by: Bet Yosef

The Shulchan Aruch (Hebrew: שֻׁלְחָן עָרוּך, romanized: šulḥān ʿaruḵ, lit. 'Set Table' [ʃulˈħɔn ʕaˈruχ]), (Note: Also spelled Shulchan Arukh; Shulhan Arukh) often called "the Code of Jewish Law", is the most widely consulted of the various legal codes in Rabbinic Judaism. It was authored in the city of Safed (modern-day Tzfat, Israel) by Joseph Karo in 1563 and published in Venice two years later. Together with its commentaries, it is the most widely accepted compilation of halakha or Jewish law ever written.

The halachic rulings in the Shulchan Aruch generally follow Sephardic law and customs, whereas Ashkenazi Jews generally follow the halachic rulings of Moses Isserles, whose glosses to the Shulchan Aruch note where the Sephardic and Ashkenazi customs differ. These glosses are widely referred to as the mappā "tablecloth" to the "Set Table". Almost all published editions of the Shulchan Aruch include this gloss, and the term has come to denote both Karo's work as well as Isserles', with Karo usually referred to as "the Meḥabbēr" (הַמְחַבֵּר, "Author") and Isserles as "the Rema" (a Hebrew acronym of his name).

Due to the increased availability of the printing press, the 16th century was an era of legal codification in the Polish–Lithuanian Commonwealth, the Ottoman Empire, and other countries. Previously unwritten laws and customs were being compiled and recorded; the Shulchan Aruch was one such compilation. In the century after it was published by Karo, whose vision was a unified Judaism under Sephardic traditions, it became the code of law for Ashkenazi Jews together with the later commentaries of Isserles and 17th-century Polish rabbis.

== Structure ==
Page of Shulchan Aruch, Even Ha'ezer section, laws of ketubot

The Shulchan Aruch and its forerunner, the Beit Yosef, follow the same structure as the Arba'ah Turim by Jacob ben Asher. There are four volumes, each subdivided into many chapters and paragraphs:

1. Orach Chayim – laws of prayer and synagogue, Sabbath, holidays
2. Yoreh De'ah – laws of kashrut; conversion to Judaism; mourning; laws pertaining to Israel; niddah
3. Even Ha'ezer – laws of marriage, divorce and related issues
4. Choshen Mishpat – laws of finance, financial responsibility, damages (personal and financial), and the rules of the beth din, as well as the laws of witnesses

=== Page layout ===
In the aside page, Karo's and Isserles' combined text is in the center of the page, top; since the 17th century, the Shulchan Aruch has been printed with Isserles' annotations in small Rashi print—and indicated by a preceding "הגה"—interspersed with Karo's text. Surrounding this are the primary commentators for the section:

- on Orach Chayim, Avraham Gombiner's Magen Avraham and David HaLevi Segal's Taz
- on Yoreh De'ah, Shabbatai HaKohen and the Taz
- on Even Ha'ezer, Samuel ben Uri Shraga Phoebus and Moses ben Isaac Judah Lima's Ḥelqat Meḥoqeq
- on Choshen Mishpat, Shabbatai haKohen and Joshua Falk's Me'irat Einayim

On the margins are various other commentaries and cross references; see below. As commentaries on the work proliferated, more sophisticated printing styles became required, similar to those of the Talmud.Additionally, many recent publishers have reformatted this work with the intent to make it more accessible to the reader.

== Beit Yosef ==
=== Its premise and style ===
The Shulchan Aruch is largely based on an earlier work by Karo, titled Beit Yosef. Although the Shulchan Aruch is largely a codification of the rulings of the Beit Yosef, it includes various rulings that are not mentioned at all in the Beit Yosef, because after completing the Beit Yosef, Karo read opinions in books he had not seen before, which he then included in the Shulchan Aruch. In his famous methodological work Yad Malachi, Malachi ben Jacob HaKohen cites a later halachic authority (Shmuel Abuhab) who reports rumors that the Shulchan Aruch was a summary of Karo's earlier rulings in Beit Yosef which he then gave to certain of his students to edit and compile. He concludes that this would then account for those seemingly self-contradictory instances in the Shulchan Aruch.

=== The standard authorities ===
Karo initially intended to rely on his judgment regarding differences of opinion between the various authorities, especially where he could support his view based on the Talmud. But he wrote that he abandoned this idea because: "Who has the courage to rear his head aloft among mountains, the heights of God?" Hence Karo adopted the halakhot of Isaac Alfasi, Maimonides, and Asher ben Jehiel as his standards, accepting as authoritative the opinion of two of the three, except in cases where most of the ancient authorities were against them or in cases where there was already an accepted custom contrary to his ruling. The net result of these last exceptions is that in several cases Karo rules in favour of the Catalan school of Nahmanides and Shlomo ibn Aderet, thus indirectly reflecting Ashkenazi opinions against the consensus of Alfasi and Maimonides. Karo often decides disputed cases without necessarily considering the age and importance of the authority in question, expressing his views simply. He follows Maimonides' example, as seen in Mishneh Torah, rather than that of Jacob ben Asher, who seldom decides between ancient authorities.

Several reasons led Karo to connect his work with the Tur instead of Maimonides.

- The Tur, although not considered as great an authority as Maimonides' code, was much more widely known; the latter being recognized only among the Sephardic Jews, while the former enjoyed a high reputation among Ashkenazim and Sephardim, as well as the Italian Jews.
- Karo intended to give not merely the results of his investigations, like Maimonides did, but also the investigations themselves. He wished not only to aid the officiating rabbi in the performance of his duties, but also to trace for the student the development of particular laws from the Talmud through later rabbinical literature.
- Unlike the Tur, Maimonides' code encompasses all fields of halakha, including both those of present-day relevance and those dealing with past and future times (such as laws of sacrifices, the Messiah in Judaism, kings, etc.). For Karo, whose interest lay in ruling on the practical issues, the Tur seemed a better choice.

== Moses Isserles ==
Moses Isserles began writing his commentary on the "Arba'ah Turim" and the "Darekhe Moshe" around the same time as Yosef Karo. Karo finished his work, "Bet Yosef", first, and it was presented to the Rema as a gift from one of his students. Upon receiving the gift, the Rema could not understand how he had spent so many years unaware of Karo's efforts. After looking through the Bet Yosef, the Rema realized that Karo had mainly relied upon Sephardic poskim.

In place of Karo's three standard authorities, Isserles cites "the later authorities" (chiefly based on the works of Yaakov Moelin, Israel Isserlein and Israel Bruna, together with the Franco-German Tosafists) as criteria of opinion. While ben Jehiel on many occasions based his decision on these sources, Isserles gave them more prominence in developing practical legal rulings. By incorporating these other opinions, Isserles addressed some major criticisms regarding what many viewed as the arbitrary selection of the three authorities upon whose opinions Karo based his work.

After realizing this, Isserles shortened the Darekhe Moshe to focus only on rulings which differ from Bet Yosef.

The halachic rulings in the Shulchan Aruch generally follow the Sephardic custom. Isserles added his glosses and published them as a commentary on the "Shulchan Aruch", specifying whenever the Sephardic and Ashkenazic customs differed. These glosses are sometimes referred to as the "Tablecloth" to the "Set Table". Almost all published editions of the Shulchan Aruch include this gloss.

The importance of the minhag "prevailing local custom", is also a point of dispute between Karo and Isserles: while Karo held fast to original authorities and material reasons, Isserles considered the minhag as an object of great importance, and not to be omitted in a codex. This point led Isserles to write his glosses to the Shulchan Aruch, so that the minhagim of the Ashkenazim might be recognized and not set aside due to Karo's reputation.

== Reception ==
Karo wrote the Shulchan Aruch in his old age, for the benefit of those who did not possess the education necessary to understand the Beit Yosef. The format of this work parallels that adopted by Jacob ben Asher in his Arba'ah Turim, but more concisely; without citing sources.

Shulchan Aruch has been "the code" of Rabbinical Judaism for all ritual and legal questions that arose after the destruction of the Temple in Jerusalem; see Halakha § Orthodox Judaism and Yeshiva § Jewish law re its contemporary function and status. The author himself had no very high opinion of the work, remarking that he had written it chiefly for "young students". He never refers to it in his responsa, but always to the Beit Yosef. The Shulchan Aruch achieved its reputation and popularity not only against the wishes of the author, but, perhaps, through the very scholars who criticized it.

Recognition or denial of Karo's authority lay entirely with the Polish Talmudists. German Jewish authorities had been forced to give way to Polish ones as early as the beginning of the sixteenth century. Karo had already been opposed by several Sephardic contemporaries, such as Yom Tov Tzahalon, who designated the Shulchan Aruch as a book for "children and ignoramuses", and Jacob Castro, whose work Erekh ha-Shulchan consists of critical glosses to the Shulchan Aruch. Moses Isserles and Maharshal were Karo's first important adversaries in Eastern Europe. Further in response to those who wished to force the rulings of the Shulchan Aruch upon those communities following Rambam, Karo wrote:

Who is he whose heart conspires to approach forcing congregations who practice according to the RaMBaM of blessed memory, to go by any one of the early or latter-day Torah authorities?! ... Is it not a case of a fortiori, that regarding the School of Shammai—that the halakhah does not go according to them—they [the Talmudic Sages] said 'if [one practices] like the School of Shammai [he may do so, but] according to their leniencies and their stringencies': The RaMBaM, is the greatest of all the Torah authorities, and all the communities of the Land of Israel and the Arab-controlled lands and the West [North Africa] practice according to his word, and accepted him upon themselves as their Chief Rabbi. Whoever practices according to him with his leniencies and his stringencies, why coerce them to budge from him? And all the more so if also their fathers and forefathers practiced accordingly: for their children are not to turn right or left from the RaMBaM of blessed memory. And even if communities that practice according to the Rosh or other authorities like him became the majority, they cannot coerce the minority of congregations practicing according to the RaMBaM of blessed memory, to practice like they do. And there is no issue here concerning the prohibition against having two courts in the same city ['lo tithgodedu'’], since every congregation should practice according to its original custom ...

Similarly, many later halachic authorities predicated the acceptance of the authority of the Shulchan Aruch on the lack of an existing and widely accepted custom to the contrary. Eventually though, the rulings of the Shulchan Aruch became the accepted standard not only in Europe and the diaspora, but even in the land of Israel where they had previously followed other authorities.

=== Criticism by Karo's contemporaries ===
Following its initial appearance, many rabbis criticised the appearance of this latest code of Jewish law, echoing similar criticisms of previous codes of law.

==== Rabbi Judah Loew ben Bezalel ====
Rabbi Judah Loew ben Bezalel (known as "Maharal", 1520–1609) wrote:

To decide halakhic questions from the codes without knowing the source of the ruling was not the intent of these authors. Had they known that their works would lead to the abandonment of Talmud, they would not have written them. It is better for one to decide on the basis of the Talmud even though he might err, for a scholar must depend solely on his understanding. As such, he is beloved of God, and preferable to the one who rules from a code but does not know the reason for the ruling; such a one walks like a blind person.

==== Rabbi Shmuel Eidels ====
Samuel Eidels (known as the "Maharsha", 1555–1631), criticized those who rule directly from the Shulchan Aruch without being fully conversant with the Talmudic source(s) of the ruling: "In these generations, those who rule from the Shulchan Aruch without knowing the reasoning and Talmudic basis ... are among the 'destroyers of the world' and should be protested."

==== Rabbi Yoel Sirkis ====
Another prominent critic of the Shulchan Aruch was Joel Sirkis (1561–1640), rabbi and author of a commentary to the Arba'ah Turim entitled the "New House" (בית חדש, commonly abbreviated as the Bach ב״ח), and Meir Lublin, author of the commentary on the Bach entitled the Shut HaBach (שו״ת הב״ח):

It is impossible to rule (in most cases) based on the Shulchan Aruch, as almost all his words lack accompanying explanations, particularly (when writing about) monetary law. Besides this, we see that many legal doubts arise daily, and are mostly the subject of scholarly debate, necessitating vast wisdom and proficiency to arrive at a sufficiently sourced ruling.

==== Other criticisms ====
The strongest criticism against all such codes of Jewish law is the contention that they inherently violate the principle that halakha must be decided according to the later sages; this principle is commonly known as hilkheta ke-vatra'ei ("the halakha follows the later ones").

A modern commentator, Menachem Elon explains:

This rule dates from the Geonic period. It laid down the law and states that "until the time of Rabbis Abbaye and Rava (4th century) the Halakha was to be decided according to the views of the earlier scholars, but from that time onward, the halakhic opinions of post-talmudic scholars would prevail over the contrary opinions of a previous generation" (see Piskei Ha'Rosh, Bava Metzia 3:10, 4:21, Shabbat 23:1 and also the Rif writing at the end of Eruvin Ch.2.)

If one does not find their statements correct and is able to maintain his own views with evidence that is acceptable to his contemporaries...he may contradict the earlier statements, since all matters that are not clarified in the Babylonian Talmud may be questioned and restated by any person, and even the statements of the Geonim may be differed from him ... just as the statements of the Amoraim differed from the earlier ones. On the contrary, we regard the statements of later scholars to be more authoritative because they knew the reasoning of the earlier scholars as well as their own, and took it into consideration in making their decision (Piskei Ha'Rosh, Sanhedrin 4:6, responsa of the Rosh 55:9).

The controversy itself may explain why the Shulchan Aruch became an authoritative code, despite significant opposition, and even against the will of its author, while Maimonides' (1135–1204) Mishneh Torah rulings were not necessarily accepted as binding among the Franco-German Jews, perhaps owing to the criticism and influence of Abraham ibn Daud (known as the "Ravad", 1110–1180). The answer may lie in the fact that the criticism by ibn Daud undermined confidence in Maimonides' work, while Isserles (who corresponded with Karo) does not simply criticize, but supplements Karo's work extensively. The result was that Ashkenazim accepted the Shulchan Aruch, assuming that together with Isserles' glosses it was a reliable authority. This then became broadly accepted among Jewish communities around the world as the binding Jewish legal code.

=== Praise ===
The later major halachic authorities defer to both Karo and Isserles and cite their work as the baseline from which further halachic rulings evolve. The 17th-century scholar Joshua Höschel ben Joseph wrote,

[F]rom their wells do we drink and should a question arise (on their work), not for this shall we come to annul their words, rather we must study further as much as we can, and if we are unable to resolve (our question) then we will ascribe it to our own lack of knowledge and not (as a reason to) annul the words of these geniuses.

Jonathan Eybeschutz (d. 1764) wrote that the great breadth of the work would make it impossible to constantly come to the correct conclusion if not for the "spirit of God". Therefore, says Eybeschutz, one cannot rely on a view not presented by the Shulchan Aruch. Yehuda Heller Kahana (d. 1819) also said that was the reason one cannot rely on a view not formulated in the Shulchan Aruch.

== Major commentaries ==
A large body of commentaries have appeared on the Shulchan Aruch, beginning soon after its publication. The first major gloss, Hagahot by Moses Isserles, was published shortly after the Shulchan Aruch appeared. Isserles' student, Yehoshua Falk HaKohen published Sefer Me'irath Enayim (on Choshen Mishpat, abbreviated as Sema) several decades after the main work. Important works by the later authorities (acharonim) include but are not limited to:

- Magen Avraham ("Abraham's shield") by Avraham Gombiner (on Orach Chayim)
- Turei Zahav ("Rows of Gold", abbreviated as Taz) by David HaLevi Segal (on Orach Chayim, Yoreh Deah and Even ha-Ezer)
- Siftei Khohen ("Lips of the priest", abbreviated as Shach) by Shabbatai HaKohen (on Yoreh Deah and Choshen Mishpat)
- Beit Sh'muel by Samuel ben Uri Shraga Phoebus and Chelkat Mechokek by Moses ben Isaac Judah Lima (on Even ha-Ezer)
- Ba'er Heiteiv ("Well-Explained") by Judah Ashkenazi and Zechariah Mendel ben Aryeh Leib
- Peri Chadash ("New Fruit") by Hezekiah da Silva
- Peri Megadim ("Choice Fruit") by Joseph ben Meir Teomim
- Shaarei Teshuvah ("Entry to Responsa") by Hayyim Mordecai Margolioth
- Machatzit HaShekel ("Half-Shekel") by Samuel Loew

While these major commentaries enjoy widespread acceptance, some early editions of the Shulchan Aruch were self-published (primarily in the late 17th and early 18th centuries) with commentaries by various rabbis, although these commentaries never achieved significant recognition.

A wealth of later works include commentary and exposition by such halachic authorities as the Ketzoth ha-Choshen and Avnei Millu'im, Netivoth ha-Mishpat, the Vilna Gaon, Rabbi Yechezkel Landau (Dagul Mervavah), Rabbis Akiva Eger, Moses Sofer, and Chaim Joseph David Azulai (Birkei Yosef) whose works are widely recognized and cited extensively in later halachic literature.

In particular, Mishnah Berurah (which summarizes and decides amongst the later authorities) on the Orach Chaim section of Shulchan Aruch has achieved widespread acceptance. It is frequently even studied as a stand-alone commentary, since it is assumed to discuss all or most of the views of the major commentaries on the topics that it covers. Kaf Ha'Chaim is a similar Sephardic work. See further below re these types of works.

Several commentaries are printed on each page. Be'er ha-Golah, by Rabbi Moshe Rivkash, provides cross-references to the Talmud, other law codes, commentaries, and responsa, and thereby indicates the various sources for Halachic decisions. Beiur HaGra, by the Vilna Gaon as mentioned, traces the underlying machloket (deliberation), including how it eventually plays out, and evaluates this practice in light of the various opinions of rishonim here.

== Later collations ==
In the late 18th century, there were several attempts to recompile the major halakhic opinions into a simpler, more accessible form.

Rabbi Shneur Zalman of Liadi wrote a "Shulchan Aruch" at the behest of the Hasidic leader, Rabbi Dovber of Mezeritch. To distinguish this work from Karo's, it is generally referred to as Shulchan Aruch HaRav. Rabbi Abraham Danzig was the first in the Lithuanian Jewish community to attempt a summary of the opinions in the above-mentioned works in his Chayei Adam and Chochmath Adam. Similar works are Ba'er Heitev and Sha'arei Teshuvah/Pitchei Teshuvah (usually published as commentaries in most editions of the Shulchan Aruch), as well as Kitzur Shulchan Aruch (by Rabbi Shlomo Ganzfried of Hungary). Danzig's and Ganzfried's works do not follow the structure of the Shulchan Aruch, but given their single-voiced approach, are considered easier to follow for those with less background in halacha.

The Mishna Berura, the main work of halakha by Rabbi Yisrael Meir Kagan (the "Chafetz Chaim") is a collation of the opinions of later authorities on the Orach Chayim section of the Shulchan Aruch. Aruch HaShulchan, by Rabbi Yechiel Michel Epstein, is a more analytical work attempting the same task from a different angle, and covering all sections of the Shulchan Aruch. The former, though narrower in scope, enjoys much wider popularity and is considered authoritative by many adherents of Orthodox Judaism, especially among those typically associated with Ashkenazic yeshivas. The Ben Ish Chai, Kaf Ha'Chaim, and much more recently, the Yalkut Yosef are similar works by Sephardic Rabbis for their communities.

== Halacha Yomit ==
Sections of the Shulchan Aruch are studied in many Jewish schools throughout the world on a daily basis. There is also a daily study program known as the Halacha Yomit.
