= Orach Chayim =

Section of Rabbi Jacob addressing aspects of Jewish law pertinent to the Hebrew calendar

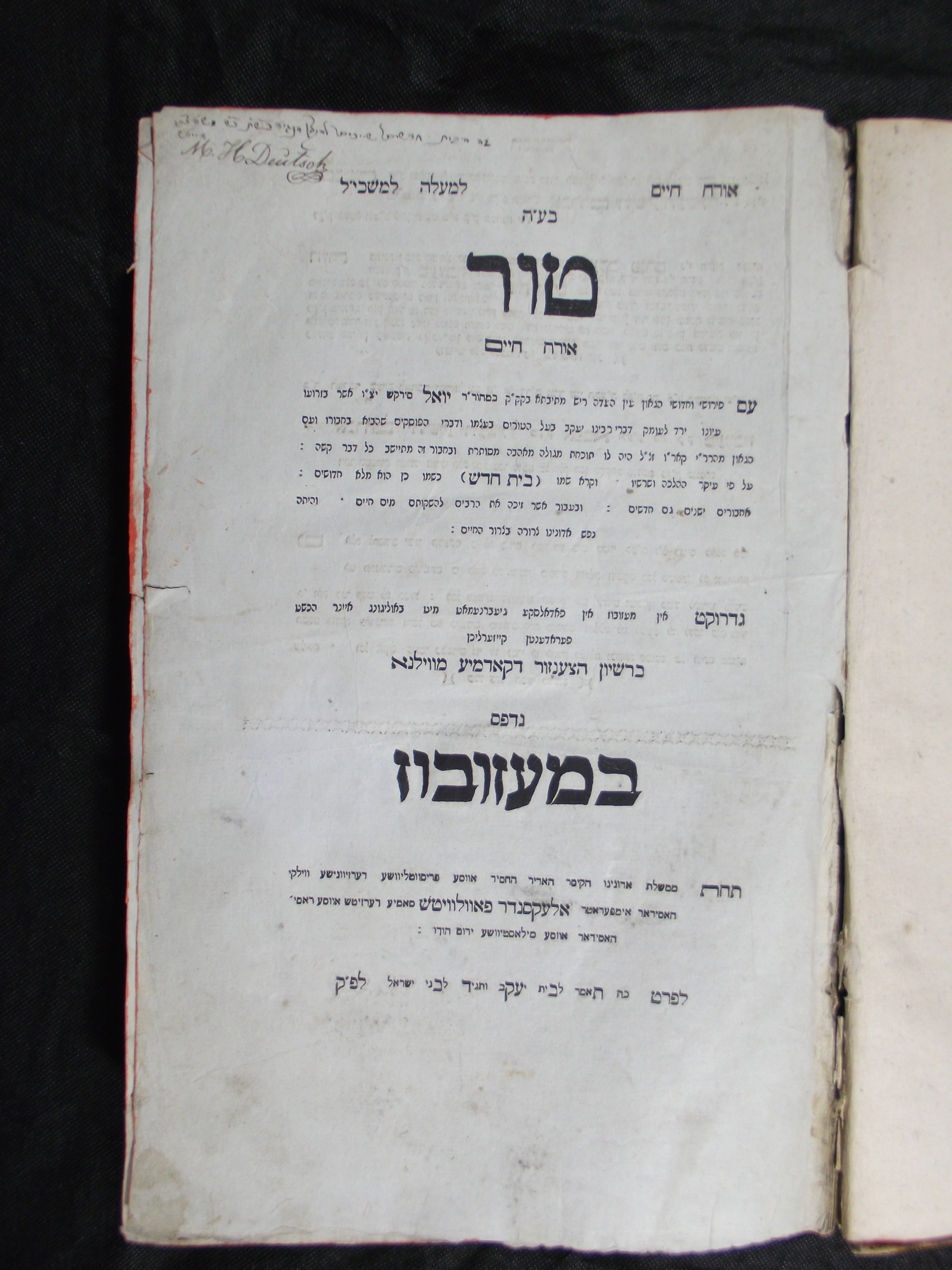
Orach Chayim book of 1817/1818 published from the collection of the "Mezhybizh" State Reserve (Ukraine)

Orach Chayim ("manner/way of life") is a section of Rabbi Jacob ben Asher's compilation of Halakha (Jewish law), Arba'ah Turim. This section addresses aspects of Jewish law pertinent to the Hebrew calendar (be it the daily, weekly, monthly, or annual calendar). Rabbi Yosef Karo modeled the framework of the Shulkhan Arukh (שולחן ערוך), his own compilation of practical Jewish law, after the Arba'ah Turim. Many later commentators used this framework, as well. Thus, Orach Chayim in common usage may refer to another area of halakha, separate from Rabbi Jacob ben Asher's compilation.

Orach Chayim deals with but is not limited to:

- Washing the hands in the morning
- Tefillin
- Tzitzit (ritual fringes)
- Prayer
- Sabbath
- Festivals
- Torah reading in synagogue.

== Commentaries on the Shulchan Aruch – Orach Chayim ==
- Taz (Turei Zohov) – by Rabbi David HaLevi Segal
- Magen Avraham – by Rabbi Avraham Gombiner
- Biur HaGra – by the Vilna Gaon
- Pri Megadim – by Rabbi Joseph ben Meir Teomim
- Mishnah Berurah – by Rabbi Yisrael Meir Kagan
- Tor Bareket – by Rabbi Chaim HaKohen of Aram Zobah (Aleppo)

== Maginei Eretz ==
Maginei Eretz was the first edition of the Orach Chaim, published with the commentaries Magen David and Magen Avraham on either side of the main text. This format has been maintained and today is the standard format for the Shulchan Aruch Orach Chaim. The name "Maginei Eretz" translates as "shields of the earth," a quote from Psalms 47:10 ("... for the shields of the earth belong to God: He is greatly exalted.")

The Magen David was written by Rabbi David HaLevi Segal and has since been referred to as the "Taz" (The abbreviation for Turei Zahav), for consistency with Segal's commentary on the Yoreh Deah section of the Shulchan Aruch.

The Magen Avraham was written by Rabbi Avraham Gombiner. The Maginei Eretz was published by his son, Chaim, following his father's death.

== See also ==
The other three sections of Arba'ah Turim and other works borrowing its organizational scheme are:

- Yoreh De'ah
- Choshen Mishpat
- Even HaEzer

== Bibliography ==
- Chabad.org article on Rabbi David Halevi Segal
