= Abraham Isaac Kook =

Chief rabbi of British Mandatory Palestine (1865–1935)

Rabbi Abraham Isaac Kook
- אברהם יצחק הכהן קוק
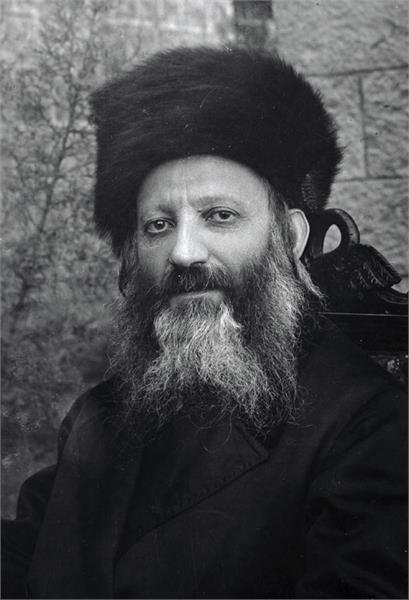
- Abraham Isaac Kook in 1924
- Title: First Chief Rabbi of British Mandatory Palestine

Personal life
- Born: 7 September 1865 Griva, Russian Empire (today Daugavpils, Latvia)
- Died: 1 September 1935 (aged 69) Jerusalem, British Mandate of Palestine
- Buried: Mount of Olives Jewish Cemetery
- Children: Zvi Yehuda Kook

Religious life
- Religion: Judaism
- Denomination: Orthodox

Abraham Isaac HaCohen Kook (Hebrew: אַבְרָהָם יִצְחָק הַכֹּהֵן קוּק; 7 September 1865 – 1 September 1935), known as HaRav Kook, and also known by the Hebrew-language acronym Hara'ayah (הראי״ה), (Note: from Hebrew: הַרַב אַבְרָהָם יִצְחָק הַכֹּהֵן haRav ʾAvrāhām Yīṣḥāq haKōhēn) was an Orthodox rabbi, and the first Ashkenazi Chief Rabbi of British Mandatory Palestine. He is considered to be one of the fathers of religious Zionism and is known for founding the Mercaz HaRav Yeshiva.

== Biography ==
=== Childhood ===
Kook was born in Griva (also spelled Geriva) in the Courland Governorate of the Russian Empire in 1865, today a part of Daugavpils, Latvia, the eldest of eight children. His father, Rabbi Shlomo Zalman Ha-Cohen Kook, was a student of the Volozhin yeshiva, the "mother of the Lithuanian yeshivas", whereas his maternal grandfather was a follower of the Kapust branch of the Hasidic movement, founded by the son of the third rebbe of Chabad, Rabbi Menachem Mendel Schneersohn. His mother's name was Zlata Perl.

He entered the Volozhin Yeshiva in 1884 at the age of 18, where he became close to the rosh yeshiva, Rabbi Naftali Zvi Yehuda Berlin (the Netziv). During his time in the yeshiva, he studied under Rabbi Eliyahu David Rabinowitz-Teomim (also known as the Aderet), the rabbi of Ponevezh (today's Panevėžys, Lithuania) and later Chief Ashkenazi Rabbi of Jerusalem. In 1886 Kook married Rabinowitz-Teomim's daughter, Batsheva.

=== Early career ===
In 1887, at the age of 23, Kook entered his first rabbinical position as rabbi of Zaumel, Lithuania. In 1888, his wife died, and his father-in-law convinced him to marry her cousin, Raize-Rivka, the daughter of the Aderet's twin brother. Kook's only son, Zvi Yehuda Kook, was born in 1891 to Kook and his second wife. In 1896, Kook became the rabbi of Bauska.

While serving in Boisk, Kook gave an approbation, dated 1902, to the responsa work Beit Yedidya by Rabbi Shaul Yedidya Shochet, later a rabbi in Chicago.

Between 1901 and 1904, he published three articles which anticipate the philosophy that he later more fully developed in the Land of Israel. His disciple David Cohen, known as "Rav HaNazir" or "the Nazir of Jerusalem", later compiled extracts from Kook's writings on animals and vegetarianism under the title A Vision of Vegetarianism and Peace.

=== Jaffa ===
In 1904, Kook was invited to become Rabbi in Jaffa, Ottoman Palestine, and he arrived there in 1905. During these years he wrote a number of works, mostly published posthumously, notably a lengthy commentary on the Aggadot of Tractates Berakhot and Shabbat, titled Eyn Ayah, and a brief book on morality and spirituality, titled Mussar Avicha.

It was in 1911 that Kook also maintained a correspondence with the Jews of Yemen, addressing some twenty-six questions to "the honorable shepherds of God's congregation" (Heb. כבוד רועי עדת ד) and sending his letter via the known Zionist emissary, Shemuel Yavneʼeli. Their reply was later printed in a book published by Yavneʼeli. Kook's influence on people in different walks of life was already noticeable, as he engaged in kiruv ("Jewish outreach"), thereby creating a greater role for Torah and Halakha in the life of the city and the nearby settlements. In 1913 Kook led a delegation of rabbis, including several leading rabbinic figures such as Rabbi Yosef Chaim Sonnenfeld, to the many newly established secular "moshavot" (settlements) in Samaria and Galilee. Known as the "Journey of the Rabbis" the rabbis' goal was to strengthen Shabbat observance, Torah education, and other religious observances, with an emphasis on the giving of 'terumot and ma'asrot' (agricultural tithes) as these were farming settlements.

=== London and World War I ===
When the First World War began, Kook was in Germany, where he was interned as an alien. He escaped to London via Switzerland, but the ongoing conflict forced him to stay in the UK for the remainder of the war. The Kooks arrived in London on January 28, 1916, and moved into lodgings provided by Mendel Chaikin, a Chabad Hasid and vintner. He became rabbi of the Spitalfields Great Synagogue (Machzike Hadath, "upholders of the law"), a strictly Orthodox community located in Brick Lane, Spitalfields, London, and Kook lived at 9 Princelet Street, Spitalfields.

=== Chief Rabbi of Jerusalem ===
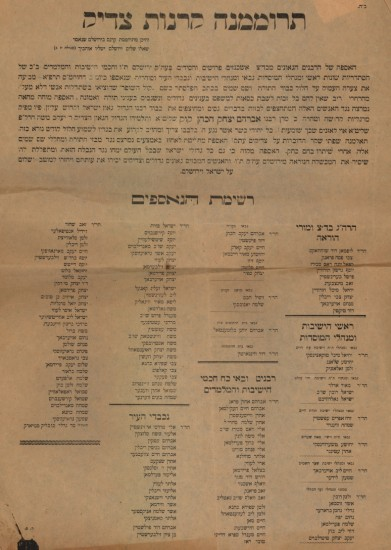
Proclamation by 80 rabbis in support of Kook after the printing of Kol Ha-Shofar in 1921

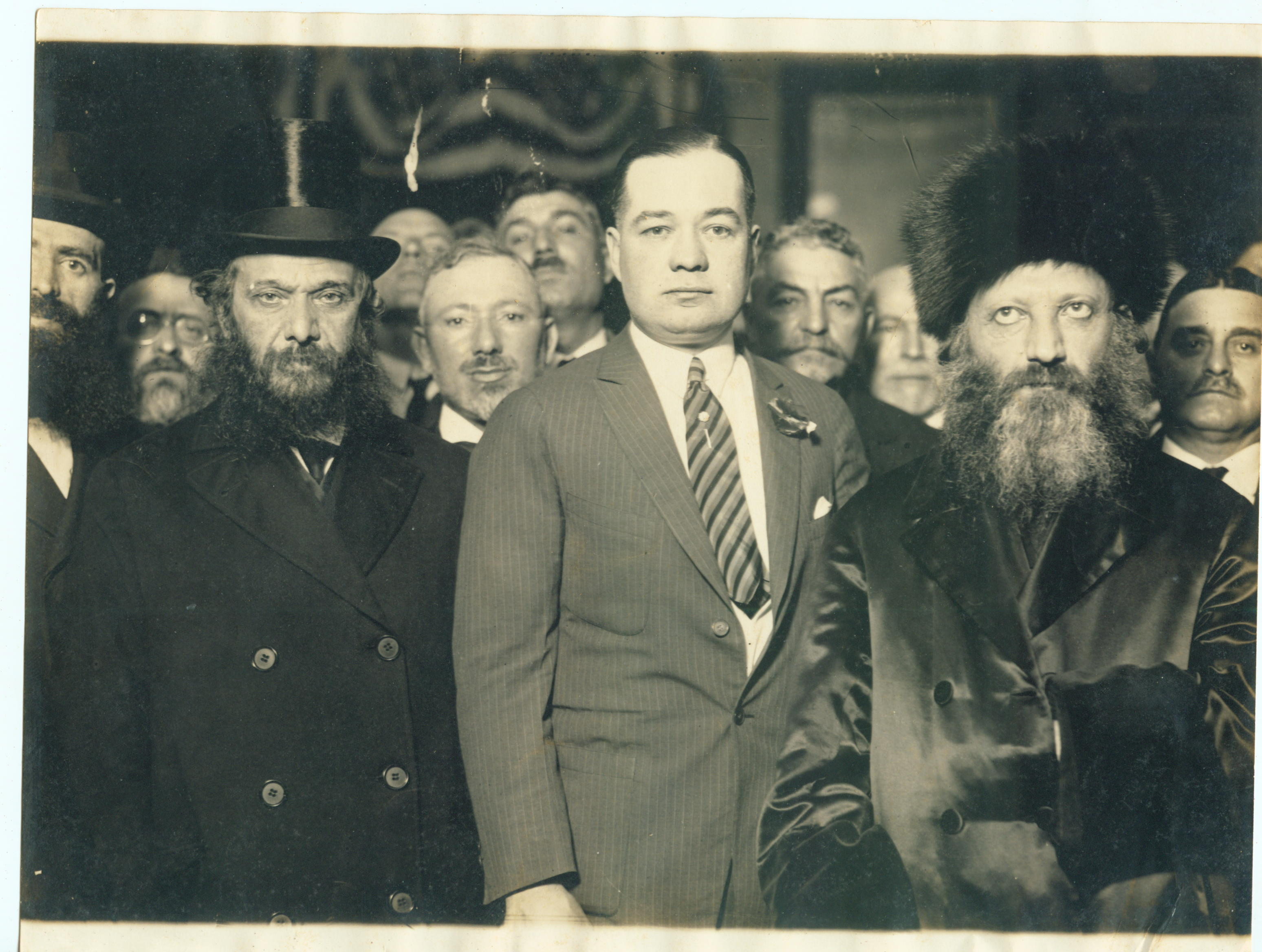
Kook with Mayor of New York John F. Hylan (1924)

Upon returning from Europe in 1919, he was appointed the Ashkenazi Chief Rabbi of Jerusalem, and soon after, as first Ashkenazi Chief Rabbi of Palestine in 1921. (Note: The following "Public Notice" appeared in the Palestine Gazette on April 1, 1921: "The Rabbinical Assembly held in Jerusalem on February 24th, 1921, Adar-Rishon 16th 5681 elected the following Rabbis as the Rabbinical Council for Palestine: Rabbi Jacob Meir and Rabbi Abraham Isaac Cohen Kook as Chief Rabbis, and Rabbis Benjamin Alkosser, Benzion Koenka, and Abraham Pilosoph as Sephardic members, and Rabbis Zevi Pesah Frank, Yonah Raam and Fischel Bernstein as Ashkenazic members of the Council. Doctor M. Eliash, Mr. M. Levanon, and Mr. J. H. Panigel were elected as lay councillors to the Rabbinical Council. The Government of Palestine will recognize the Council and any Beth-Din sanctioned by it as the sole authorities in matters of Jewish Law. It will execute through the Civil Courts judgments given by the Beth-Din of the Council in first instance or on appeal as well as the judgments given by any Beth-Din in Palestine sanctioned by the Council. The appointment of Haham Bashi no longer exists in Palestine; and no person is recognized by the Government as a Chief-Rabbi of Palestine except the Rabbis elected by the Assembly. W. H. DEEDES, Civil Secretary, Government House, March 18th, 1921." [End Quote])

In March 1924, in an effort to raise funds for Torah institutions in Palestine and Europe, Kook travelled to America with Rabbi Moshe Mordechai Epstein of the Slabodka Yeshiva and the Rabbi of Kaunas, Avraham Dov Baer Kahana Shapiro. In the same year, Kook founded the Mercaz HaRav yeshiva in Jerusalem.

Kook died in Jerusalem in 1935 and his funeral was attended by an estimated 20,000 mourners.

== Alliances ==
Kook maintained communication and political alliances with various Jewish sectors, including the secular Jewish Zionist leadership, the Religious Zionists, and more traditional non-Zionist Orthodox Jews.

=== Inauguration of Hebrew University ===
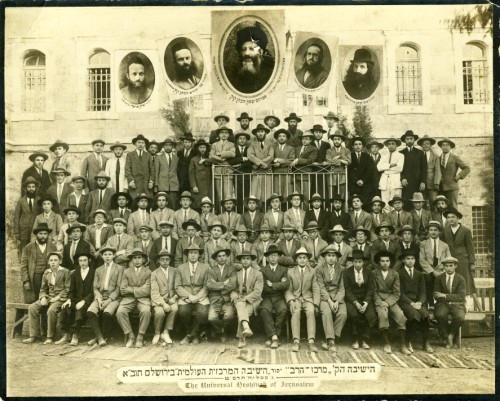
Students of Mercaz Harav Yeshiva

In 1928, Kook wrote a letter to Rabbi Joseph Messas (Chief Rabbi in Algeria), addressing certain misquotes which were erroneously being repeated in his name regarding a speech he gave at the inauguration of Hebrew University. The following are translated excerpts from the letter Kook wrote to Messas:

...from the time that I came to the Holy Land, it has been my goal to the best of my ability to draw also those who are estranged and speak to their heart, so that they will come close to Torah and mitzvot – including even those young people who want to develop their physical health so that they will have the strength to protect our holy nation in times of violence, Heaven forbid, at a time when vicious enemies rise up against us...in regard to Hebrew University, Heaven forbid that I should say regarding secular studies that 'From Zion will come forth Torah.'

To the contrary, I told them explicitly that I am afraid lest there come forth, Heaven forbid, a stumbling block from their hands if they reject the Torah and the fear of God and 'please themselves in the brood of aliens' [i.e., studies antithetical to Torah such as Biblical Criticism]. I brought them examples of this from the past, from the incidents that took place due to people's sins [during the Berlin Enlightenment], from which came forth groups that turned away from God and abandoned the source of living waters. But they must guard the holiness of Israel, teachers and students alike, and not follow foreign ideas nor turn aside from the Torah and the mitzvos. And even then, it is not from secular subjects that Torah will come forth, but rather when we support the holy yeshivas, which are dedicated solely to the holiness of the Torah.

Together with this, [I told them that] they should elevate the power of the tzaddikim and Torah giants who fear God. And the Central Yeshiva [Mercaz HaRav] in our holy and beautiful city, which we are toiling to establish and expand with God's help, will stand in its great glory. Then, upon the foundation of the holy yeshivas, I said that the verse 'From Zion will come forth Torah' will be fulfilled.

These words are explicit in my speech that I spoke at that time before the people, before all of the important officials who came to the celebration, and to the entire great crowd of thousands who came from the far ends of the Holy Land and from the lands of the Diaspora. So how can malicious people come to distort the words of the living God in a way that is so filled with wickedness and folly?...

=== Theodor Herzl eulogy ===
In 1904, Kook wrote a letter to his father-in-law, addressing certain misquotes which were erroneously being repeated in his name regarding a speech he gave after Theodor Herzl's passing:

...Now, two gentlemen came to me… and requested me … since they were planning to gather in the bank building here to honor the memory of Dr. Herzl and it was their finding that even those opposed to Zionism would not deny that there were in his heart thoughts concerning the betterment of Israel. Although unfortunately [Herzl] did not find the straight path, nevertheless, 'The Holy One does not withhold credit for even good talk.' It would be poor manners not to arrange a memorial in his honor in a public meeting place, such as the Anglo-Palestine Bank here. Therefore I promised them I would attend.

Understandably, once I agreed to come, I did not want to refuse to speak some words. I assessed that, God willing, benefit would derive from my words, inasmuch as the other speakers would not have the audacity to belittle God, His Torah, and the sages of Israel.

Thank God, this assessment proved correct. Of course, I spoke pleasantly and politely, but I did reveal the fundamental failure of their [the Zionists'] entire enterprise, namely the fact that they do not place at the top of their list of priorities the sanctity of God and His great name, which is the power that enables Israel to survive ... In my remarks, I offered no homage to Dr. Herzl per se.

What I did say was that such a thought of improving the situation of Israel in Eretz Israel would be worthwhile if we would rise to the occasion. It would require a return to God by observing and honoring the Torah, and a consensus that the foundation of all must be the power of Torah. Repenting of baseless hatred, and wholehearted peace-seeking as obligated [by Torah] would result in success because it would be close to God's will. We must make amends toward the future that the power of the sanctity of Torah be at the top of our list of priorities, that "the son of Yishai lead." If the will to improve materially will rest on Torah – then God will shine His face upon us and crown our every deed with success. At first, the salvation will be gradual, as our holy Rabbis remarked upon witnessing daybreak over the valley of Arbel, but after it will gain momentum, appearing as a great and wondrous light, as in the days of our Exodus from Egypt.

After [the address], others came to me and reported that some people read into my words ideas that I never intended ...

His empathy towards the non-religious elements aroused the suspicions of many opponents, particularly that of the traditional rabbinical establishment that had functioned from the time of Turkey's control of greater Palestine, whose paramount leader was Rabbi Yosef Chaim Sonnenfeld. However, Sonnenfeld and Kook deeply revered each other, evidenced by their respectful way of addressing each other in correspondence.

Kook remarked that he was fully capable of rejecting, but since there were enough practicing rejection, he preferred to fill the role of one who embraces. However, Kook was critical of the secularists on certain occasions when they violated Halacha (Jewish law), for instance, by not observing the Sabbath or kosher laws, or ascending the Temple Mount.

Kook wrote rulings presenting his strong opposition to people ascending the Temple Mount, due to the Jewish Laws of impurity. He felt that Jews should wait until the coming of the Messiah when it will be encouraged to enter the Temple Mount. However, he was very careful to express the fact that the Kotel and the Temple Mount were holy sites that belong to the Jewish people.

Kook also opposed the secular spirit of the Hatikvah anthem and penned another anthem with a more religious theme entitled HaEmunah.

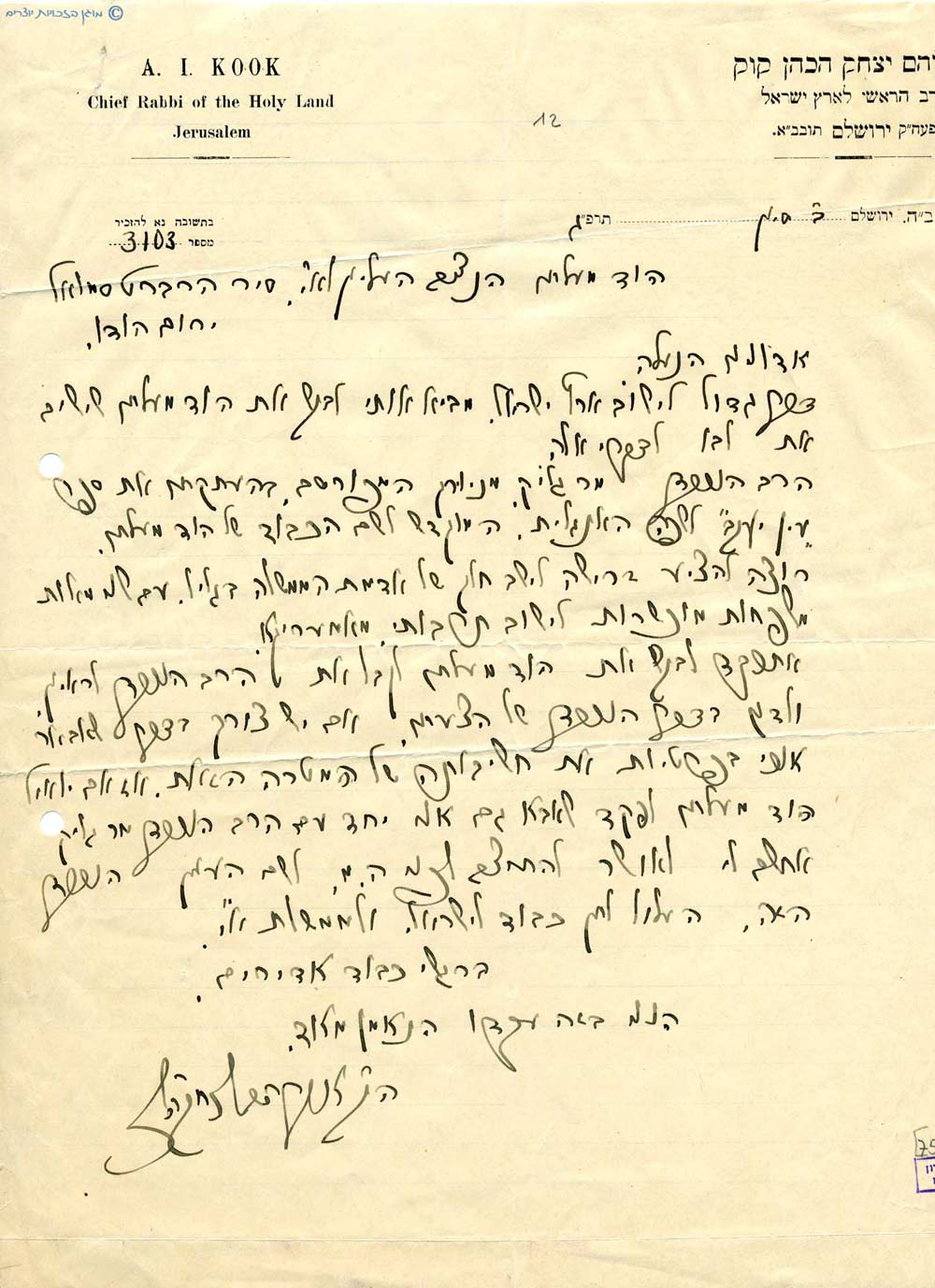
Rav Kook handwriting

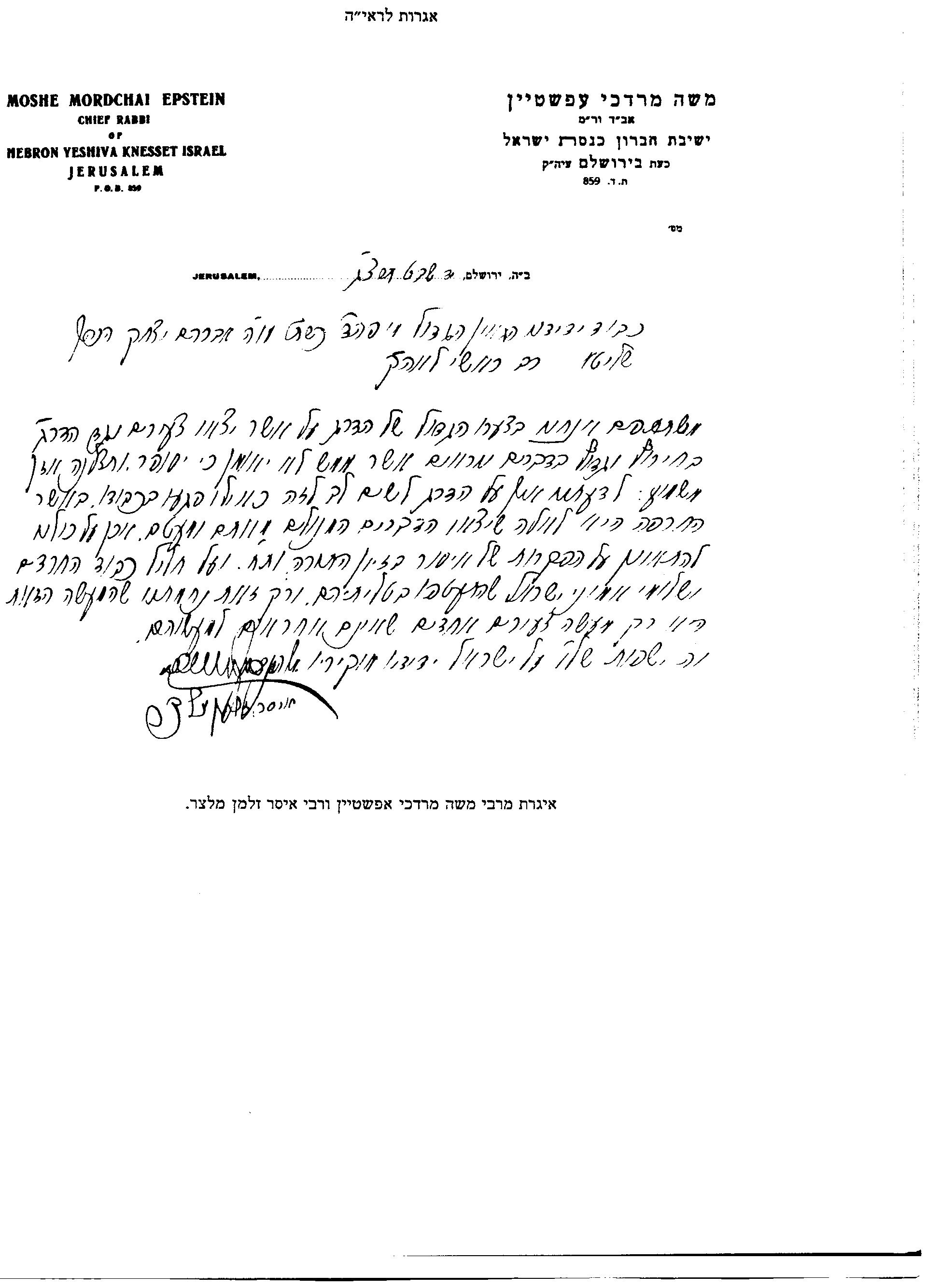
Rav Isser Zalman Meltzer and Rav Moshe Mordechai Epstein writing in support and defense of Rav Kook

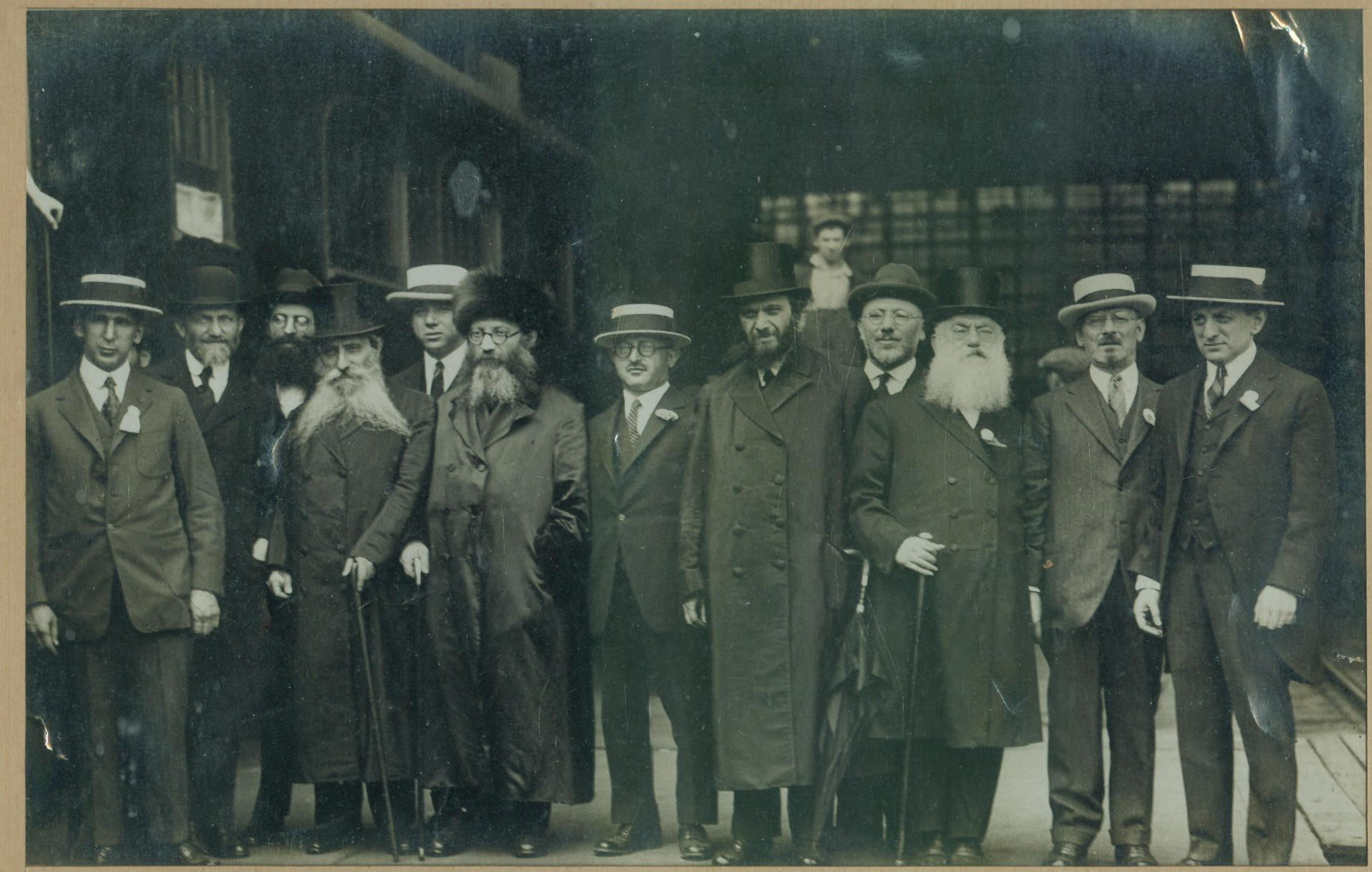
Rav Kook with Rav Moshe Mordechai Epstein and Rav Avraham Dov Ber Kahana

=== Attitude toward Zionism ===
While Kook is considered one of the most important thinkers in modern Religious Zionism, his attitude towards the "Zionism" of his time was complex.

Kook enthusiastically supported the settlement of the land which Zionists of his time were carrying out. In addition, his philosophy "la[id] a theological foundation for marrying Torah study to Zionism, and for an ethos of traditional Judaism engaged with Zionism and with modernity". And unlike many of his religious peers, he showed respect towards secular Zionists, and willingly engaged in joint projects with them (for instance, his participation in the Chief Rabbinate).

At the same time, he was critical of the religious-Zionist Mizrachi movement of his time for "tamping down religious fervor and willingly accepting secondary status within the Zionist movement". In 1917 he issued a proclamation entitled Degel Yerushalayim, where he distinguished between "Zion" (representing political sovereignty) and "Jerusalem" (representing holiness), and arguing that Zion (i.e. Zionism) must take a cooperative but eventually subservient role in relation to Jerusalem. He then went on to found a "Degel Yerushalayim" movement separate from the Zionist movement, though this initiative had little success.

== Legacy ==
The Israeli moshav Kfar Haroeh, a settlement founded in 1933, was named after Kook, "Haroah" being a Hebrew acronym for "HaRav Avraham HaCohen". His son Zvi Yehuda Kook, who was also his most prominent student, took over teaching duties at Mercaz HaRav after his death, and dedicated his life to disseminating his father's writings. Many students of Kook's writings and philosophy eventually formed Hardal Religious Zionist movement which is today led by rabbis who studied under Kook's son at Mercaz HaRav.

In 1937, Yehuda Leib Maimon established Mossad Harav Kook, a religious research foundation and notable publishing house, based in Jerusalem. It is named after Kook.

== Teachings ==
A central principle in Rav Kook's philosophy is ahavat chinam ("baseless" or unconditional love) among Jews. His writings stress that ahavat chinam is central to spiritual and communal renewal, a theme he develops extensively in his book "Orot HaKodesh". He held that the historic destruction of the Second Temple, often attributed to "sinat chinam" (baseless hatred), could only be remedied by cultivating love and unity among all Jews even those far removed from traditional religious observance. Rav Kook argued that this love is not blind or naive; rather, it flows from a deep awareness of the shared spiritual destiny and inherent worth of every Jew. This concept of universal Jewish unity, grounded in compassion, respect, and mutual responsibility, became a hallmark of his legacy, influencing religious Zionist thought, educational institutions, and Jewish communal discourse worldwide.

In line with many orthodox interpreters of the Jewish religion, Kook believed that there was a fundamental difference between Jews and Gentiles.

“The difference between the Israelite neshama [spiritual soul]...and the neshama of all the nations, in their various grades, is greater and deeper than the difference between the nefesh [biological soul]... of man and the nefesh of animals. For between the latter there is only a quantitative difference, while between the former there exists a qualitative, essential difference.”

=== Animals and vegetarianism ===
Kook developed a theological and ethical account of human relations with animals. Between 1903 and 1904, he published a series of essays in the Hebrew periodical Ha-Peles that were later edited by his disciple David Cohen and published as A Vision of Vegetarianism and Peace. Y. Michael Barilan describes the work as the only treatise in rabbinic Judaism devoted to the relationship between humans and animals and argues that the subject was central to Kook's ethical thought, while Idan Breier describes it as the first systematic Jewish treatise on human-animal relations.

Kook interpreted the creation account in Genesis as depicting an original state in which neither humans nor animals killed other creatures for food. He rejected the view that human dominion gave humans a licence to kill or exploit animals, and held that compassion towards animals was a duty imposed by God. He also wrote that human and animal souls ultimately derive from the same source of life. In Kook's account, humanity's subsequent moral decline led God to permit meat-eating as a temporary concession to human weakness. He therefore regarded the use of animals as a transitional condition rather than an expression of an inherent human entitlement to exploit them.

Kook held that ethical development should proceed gradually. He did not advocate vegetarianism as an immediate social programme, arguing that it was appropriate only for individuals capable of adopting it without neglecting moral obligations towards other humans; Kook himself was not a vegetarian. He interpreted Jewish dietary laws and other commandments concerning animals as means of limiting animal suffering and educating humans towards greater consideration for animals. These included restrictions on slaughter, the consumption of blood, taking a mother bird with her young, and the use of animal products such as milk and wool.

Kook's account was also eschatological. He interpreted biblical prophecies of peaceful relations among animals literally and held that humanity and the animal world would ultimately return to a state in which killing and predation had ceased. In this future condition, humans would no longer desire meat and justice and compassion would extend throughout relations between humans and other animals.

== Controversy ==
=== Criticism from rabbinic scholars ===
In formulating religious Zionism, Kook broke with many other Orthodox rabbis.

Many Orthodox rabbis saw nothing but evil in the early Zionist pioneers who were hostile to religion, and in their belief that their labor rather than God would save the Jewish people. Kook on the other hand, defended their behaviour in theological terms, and even hailed them as playing a role, by their labors, in hastening the messianic deliverance. His stance was deemed heretical by the traditional religious establishment.

Although Kook was a very learned man, he was never accepted by the Haredi leadership. In 1921 his detractors bought up the whole edition of his newly published Orot to prevent its circulation, plastering the offending passages on the walls of Meah Shearim. Later, an anonymous pamphlet entitled Kol Ha-Shofar appeared containing a declaration signed by rabbis Sonnenfeld, Diskin and others saying: "We were astonished to see and hear gross things, foreign to the entire Torah, and we see that which we feared before his coming here, that he will introduce new forms of deviance that our rabbis and ancestors could not have imagined …. It is to be deemed a sorcerer's book? If so, let it be known that it is forbidden to study [let alone] rely on all his nonsense and dreams." It also quoted Aharon Rokeach of Belz who stated "And know that the rabbi from Jerusalem, Kook – may his name be blotted out – is completely wicked and has already ruined many of our youth, entrapping them with his guileful tongue and impure books." Returning to Poland after a visit to Palestine in 1921, Rabbi Avraham Mordechai Alter of Ger wrote that he endeavoured to calm the situation by getting Kook to renounce any expressions which may have unwittingly resulted in a profanation of God's name. He then approached the elder rabbis of the Yishuv asking them to withdraw their denunciation. The rabbis claimed that their intention had been to reach a consensus on whether Kook's writings were acceptable, but their letter had been surreptitiously inserted by Kook's critics in to their inflammatory booklet without their knowledge.

In 1926 a harsh proclamation was issued against Kook that contained letters from three European rabbis in which Yosef Rosin referred to him as an "ignorant bore", Shaul Brach intimated that his Hebrew initials spelt the word "vomit" and likened him to King Jeroboam known for seducing the masses to idolatry, and Eliezer David Greenwald declared him an untrustworthy authority on Jewish law adding that his books were full of heresy and should be burnt.

When Jewish prayers at the Western Wall were broken up by the British in 1928, Kook called for a fast day, but the ultra-Orthodox community ignored his calls.

In response to a letter from Rabbi Yosef Tzvi Dushinsky of Eidah Hachareidit on whether they could partner with the Chief Rabbinate led by Kook, Rabbi Elchonon Bunim Wasserman wrote: "I have heard that there was a suggestion that there should be a partnership between the Eidah Hachareidis and the Chief Rabinate . . . It is well known that the monies from that fund go to raise deliberate heretics, and therefore someone who encourages people to support such a fund is a machti es harabim (causes the public to sin) on the most frightful level . . . thus, besides the prohibition of befriending a wicked person, since we see that he praises resha'im (evil doers), there would also be an issue of an enormous chillum Hashem (desecration of Gods name) throughout the world..."

Rabbi Yitzchak Zelig Morgenstern, the Rebbe of Sokolov also wrote against Kook, saying, "Rav Kook, although he is a full and robust talmid chacham as well as an excellent orator, cannot be considered among the successors and perpetuators of the geonim (genius rabbinic scholars) and tzaddikim (righteous leaders) of the past generations. Rav Kook is already connected with the spirit of the time, and speaks greatly about the techiyas umaseinu (our national rebirth). And despite the moral and religious decline of our generation, he sees in his mind's eye the techiyas hale'um (nationalistic rebirth) and the like, and he assigns to the Chief Rabbinate an important role in that process."

It was claimed that Rabbi Solomon Eliezer Alfandari attributed the Chofetz Chaim's failed move to the land due to the disputes surrounding Rabbi Kook.

=== Support from rabbinic scholars ===
Although it seems that many Orthodox rabbis opposed Rabbi Kook, there were many who spoke out in his support.

In a 1921 letter, Rav Zvi Pesach Frank noted that "(t)he Gaon, our Master RAY Hakohen Kook (may he live) was accepted here as Rav by the majority of the Holy Community here." (Rabbi Chaim Hirschensohn, Malki Ba-Kodesh IV (St. Louis: Moinester Printing Co., 5679 – 5682), Letter 10 (dated 18 Adar Sheni, 5681, 1921), pp. 43–44)

The Gerrer Rebbe, the Imrei Emes, said in a letter about Rav Kook that "most of the inhabitants of the Holy City and many of the rabbis side with him" (originally published in "Der Jud", the Warsaw newspaper of the Agudah, May 27, June 3, and June 10, 1921 issues, partially republished in "Algemeiner Journal" (June 5, 1992) and republished in Orot translated by Bezalel Naor, page 28 in 1993 edition) and verified Rav Kook's righteousness and Torah scholarship, despite disagreeing strongly with certain of his religious philosophies regarding secular Zionists.

In a letter to Rabbi Kook, Rabbi Isser Zalman Meltzer and Rabbi Moshe Mordechai Epstein greeted Rabbi Kook with "Our honored friend, the great gaon and glory of the generation, our master and teacher, Avraham Yitzchak Hacohen, shlita". Meltzer was also quoted as saying "Let them, any of us, pray on Yom Kippur the way Rav Kook prays on an average weekday."

Rabbi Isser Zalman Meltzer also once said to the famed Rabbi Chaim Ozer Grodzinsky from Vilna, "The two of us are considered Torah giants until we reach the door of Rabbi Kook’s office." (cited by Rabbi Eliezer Melamed, Israel National News, August 8, 2013).

There are also some rabbis who spoke very highly of Kook in greetings of the letters they sent to him.

Chaim Ozer Grodzinski: "Our friend, the gaon, our master and teacher, Rabbi Avraham Yitzchak Kook, shlita" and "The Glory of Honor, My Dear Friend, Ha-Rav Ha-Gaon, Ha-Gadol, the Famous One... The Prince of Torah, Our Teacher, Ha-Rav Avraham Yitzchak Ha-Cohen Kook Shlita..."

Boruch Ber Leibowitz: "The true gaon, the beauty, and glory of the generation, the tzaddik, his holiness, Rabbi Avraham Yitzchak, may his light shine, may he live for length of good days and years amen, the righteous Cohen, head of the beis din [court] in Jerusalem, the holy city, may it soon be built and established."

Yosef Yitzchok Schneersohn of Lubavitch: "The Gaon who is renowned with splendor among the Geonim of Ya'akov, Amud HaYemini, Patish HaChazak..."

Chatzkel Abramsky: "The honored man, beloved of Hashem and his nation, the rabbi, the gaon, great and well-known, with breadth of knowledge, the glory of the generation, etc., etc., our master Rabbi Avraham Yitzchak Hacohen Kook, shlita, Chief Rabbi of the Land of Israel and the head of the Beis Din in the holy city of Jerusalem"

The "Chazon Ish," addressed Rabbi Kook as "our royal and respected Rabbi." (cited by Rabbi Eliezer Melamed, Israel National News, August 8, 2013).

Yitzchak Hutner: "The glorious honor of our master, our teacher and rabbi, the great gaon, the crown and sanctity of Israel, Maran [our master] Rabbi Avraham Yitzchak Hacohen Kook, shlita!"

The Chofetz Chaim condemned a pamphlet that was put out against Rabbi Kook, and said about Rav Kook "that he is holy and pure, and whoever harms him will not be absolved." (Simcha Raz, An Angel Among Men, page 244)

Rabbi Shlomo Zalman Auerbach: "In the time of Rabbi Kook, the majority of Torah giants were 'all as if nothing' compared to him.” (cited by Rabbi Eliezer Melamed, Israel National News, August 8, 2013).

Rabbi Yosef Shalom Elyashiv: Owing to the close relationship Rabbi Kook had with his grandfather, the Leshem, Rabbi Shlomo Elyashiv, Rabbi Kook made the match of Rabbi Yosef Shalom Elyashiv and his wife, who was the daughter of Rabbi Kook's close student, Rabbi Aryeh Levin. Rabbi Kook officiated at their wedding, and Rabbi Yosef Shalom Elyashiv later chose Rabbi Kook to be the Kohen (Priest) to redeem his oldest son, Shlomo, at his Pidyon Ha-Ben. Rav Elyashiv revered Rav Kook for both his piety and his Talmudic erudition. Rav Elyashiv would do all he could to silence those who would criticize Rav Kook and attempt to diminish his stature. He would frequently describe Rav Kook’s saintliness at his Shabbat table and occasionally reminisce about the times he attended seudah shelishit in his home. (From the book Yisa Shalom: Choveret al Rav Kook v’Rav Elyashiv, published in Israel and cited to in the OU magazine Jewish Action, Summer 2013 issue, in the article Rav Kook & Rav Elyashiv, by Rabbi Dr. Tzvi Hersh Weinreb, executive vice president, emeritus of the Orthodox Union).

Rabbi Ovadia Yosef said of Rabbi Kook that he was "a great man" and it is "forbidden to speak against him." Rabbi Yosef further called Rabbi Kook "Tzaddik Yesod Olam" (a righteous man upon whom the world stood) and a "Malach Elokei Tzivakaot" (Holy Angel of the L-rd).

== Resources ==
=== Writings ===
==== Orot ("Lights") books ====
- Orot – organized and published by Rabbi Zvi Yehuda Kook, 1920. English translation by Bezalel Naor (Jason Aronson, 1993). ISBN 1-56821-017-5
- Orot HaTeshuvah – English translation by Ben-Zion Metzger (Bloch Pub. Co., 1968). ASIN B0006DXU94
- Orot HaEmuna
- Orot HaKodesh – four volumes, organized and published by Rabbi David Cohen
- Orot HaTorah – organized and published by Rabbi Zvi Yehuda Kook, 1940.

==== Jewish thought ====
- Chavosh Pe'er – on the mitzvah of tefillin. First printed in Warsaw, 1890.
- Eder HaYakar and Ikvei HaTzon – essays about the new generation and a philosophical understanding of God. First printed in Jaffa in 1906.
- Ein Ayah – commentary on Ein Yaakov the Aggadic sections of the Talmud. Printed in Jerusalem, 1995.
- Ma'amarei HaRe'iyah (two volumes) – a collection of articles and lectures, many originally published in various periodicals. Printed in Jerusalem, 1984.
- Midbar Shur – sermons written by Rav Kook while serving as a rabbi in Zaumel and Boisk in 1894–1896.
- Reish Millin – Kabbalistic discussion of the Hebrew alphabet and punctuation. Printed in London, 1917.

==== Halakha ====
- Be'er Eliyahu – on Hilchos Dayanim
- Orach Mishpat – Shu"t on Orach Chayim
- Ezrat Cohen – Shu"t on Even HaEzer
- Mishpat Kohen – Shu"t on issues relating to Eretz Yisrael
- Zivchei R'Iyah- Shu"t and Chidushim on Zvachim and Avodat Beit HaBchira
- Shabbat Haaretz hilchot shevi'it (shemittah)

==== Unedited and other ====
- Shmoneh Kvatzim – volume 2 of which was republished as Arpilei Tohar
- Olat Raiyah – Commentary on the Siddur
- Igrot HaRaiyah – Collected letters of Rav Kook

=== Translation and commentary ===
- (translation), Abraham Isaac Kook: The Lights of Penitence, The Moral Principles, Lights of Holiness, Essays, Letters, and Poems, Ben Zion Bokser, Paulist Press 1978. ISBN 0-8091-2159-X [Includes complete English translations of Orot ha-Teshuva ("The Lights of Penitence"), Musar Avicha ("The Moral Principles"), as well as selected translations from Orot ha-Kodesh ("The Lights of Holiness") and miscellaneous essays, letters, and poems.]
- Samson, David; Tzvi Fishman (1996). Lights Of Orot. Jerusalem: Torat Eretz Yisrael Publications. ISBN 965-90114-0-7.
- Samson, David; Tzvi Fishman (1997). War and Peace. Jerusalem: Torat Eretz Yisrael Publications. ISBN 965-90114-2-3.
- Samson, David; Tzvi Fishman (1999). The Art of T'Shuva. Jerusalem: Beit Orot Publications. ISBN 965-90114-3-1. Online edition.
- (translation), The Essential Writings of Abraham Isaac Kook, Ben Yehuda Press 2006 (reprint). ISBN 0-9769862-3-X
- Rabbi Chanan Morrison, Gold from the Land of Israel: A New Light on the Weekly Torah Portion From the Writings of Rabbi Abraham Isaac HaKohen Kook, Urim Publications 2006. ISBN 965-7108-92-6.
- Rabbi Chanan Morrison, Silver from the Land of Israel: A New Light on the Sabbath and Holidays From the Writings of Rabbi Abraham Isaac HaKohen Kook, Urim Publications 2010. ISBN 965-524-042-8.
- Rabbi Chanan Morrison, The Splendor of Tefillin: Insights into the Mitzvah of Tefillin from the Writings of Rabbi Abraham Isaac HaKohen Kook, CreateSpace 2012. ISBN 148-001-997-6.
- Rabbi Chanan Morrison, Sapphire from the Land of Israel: A New Light on the Weekly Torah Portion From the Writings of Rabbi Abraham Isaac HaKohen Kook, CreateSpace 2013. ISBN 149-090-936-2.
- Rabbi Gideon Weitzman, Sparks of Light: Essays on the Weekly Torah Portions Based on the Philosophy of Rav Kook, Jason Aronson. ISBN 0-7657-6080-0 ISBN 978-0765760807.
- Rabbi Gideon Weitzman, Light of Redemption: A Passover Haggadah Based on the Writings of Rav Kook, Urim Publications. ISBN 978-965-7108-71-0.

Also there is now a musical project that presents Kook's poetry with musical accompaniment. HA'OROT-THE LIGHTS OF RAV KOOK by Greg Wall's Later Prophets Featuring Rabbi Itzchak Marmorstein – released on Tzadik Records, April 2009.

=== Analysis ===
- The Philosophy of Rabbi Kook, Zvi Yaron, Eliner Library, 1992.
- Essays on the Thought and Philosophy of Rabbi Kook, ed. Ezra Gellman, Fairleigh Dickinson University Press, 1991. ISBN 0-8386-3452-4
- The World of Rav Kook's Thought, Shalom Carmy, Avi-Chai Publishers, 1991. ISBN 0-9623723-2-3
- Rav Avraham Itzhak HaCohen Kook: Between Rationalism and Mysticism, Benjamin Ish-Shalom, translation Ora Wiskind Elper, SUNY Press, 1993. ISBN 0-7914-1369-1
- Religious Zionism of Rav Kook Pinchas Polonsky, Machanaim, 2009, ISBN 978-965-91446-0-0
- Rabbi Abraham Isaac Kook and Jewish Spirituality , Lawrence J. Kaplan & David Shatz, NYU Press, 1994, ISBN 978-0814746530
- Ghila Amati, "Discovering the Depths Within: Kook’s Zionism and the Philosophy of Life of Henri Bergson," Religions 2023, 14(2), 261; Discovering the Depths Within: Kook’s Zionism and the Philosophy of Life of Henri Bergson
- Ghila Amati, "Freedom, Creativity, the Self, and God: Between Rabbi Kook and Bergson’s Lebensphilosophie," 'Harvard Theological Review' 2024, 117(3):558–582. doi:10.1017/S0017816024000221
- Ephraim Chamiel, The Dual Truth – Studies in Nineteenth-Century Modern Religious Thought and its Influence on Twentiest-Century Jewish Philosophy, Academic Studies Press, Boston 2019, Vol II, pp. 449–499.
- Ephraim Chamiel, Between Religion and Reason – The Dialectic Position in Contemporary Jewish Thought, Academic Studies Press, Boston 2020, part I, pp. 7–15.
- Dov Schwartz, The Religious Genius in Rabbi Kook's Thought: National "Saint"? Boston: Academic Studies Press 2014. ISBN 978-1618114112

=== Biography ===
- Simcha Raz, Angel Among Men: Impressions from the Life of Rav Avraham Yitzchak Hakohen Kook Zt""L, translated (from Hebrew) Moshe D. Lichtman, Urim Publications 2003. ISBN 965-7108-53-5 ISBN 978-9657108536
- Dov Peretz Elkins, Shepherd of Jerusalem: A Biography of Rabbi Abraham Isaac Kook, 2005. ISBN 978-1420872613
- Yehudah Mirsky, An Intellectual and Spiritual Biography of Rabbi Avraham Yitzhaq Ha-Cohen Kook from 1865 to 1904, PhD Dissertation, Harvard University, 2007.
- Yehudah Mirsky, Rav Kook: Mystic in a Time of Revolution (Jewish Lives), Yale University Press, 2014, ISBN 978-0300164244

=== Quotes ===
- Therefore, the pure righteous do not complain of the dark, but increase the light; they do not complain of evil, but increase justice; they do not complain of heresy, but increase faith; they do not complain of ignorance, but increase wisdom.
- There could be a freeman with the spirit of the slave, and there could be a slave with a spirit full of freedom; whoever is faithful to himself – he is a freeman, and whoever fills his life only with what is good and beautiful in the eyes of others – he is a slave.

== Gallery ==
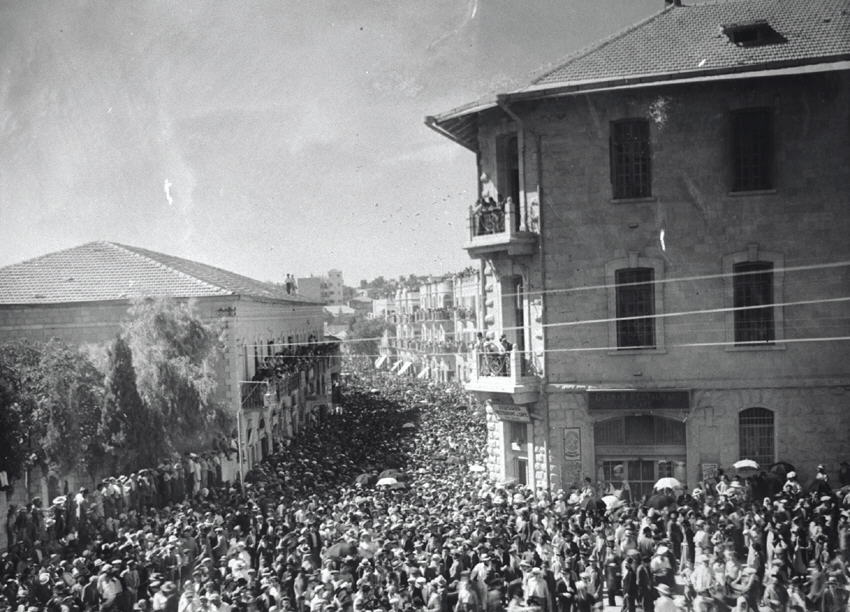
Kooks funeral, Jerusalem 1935

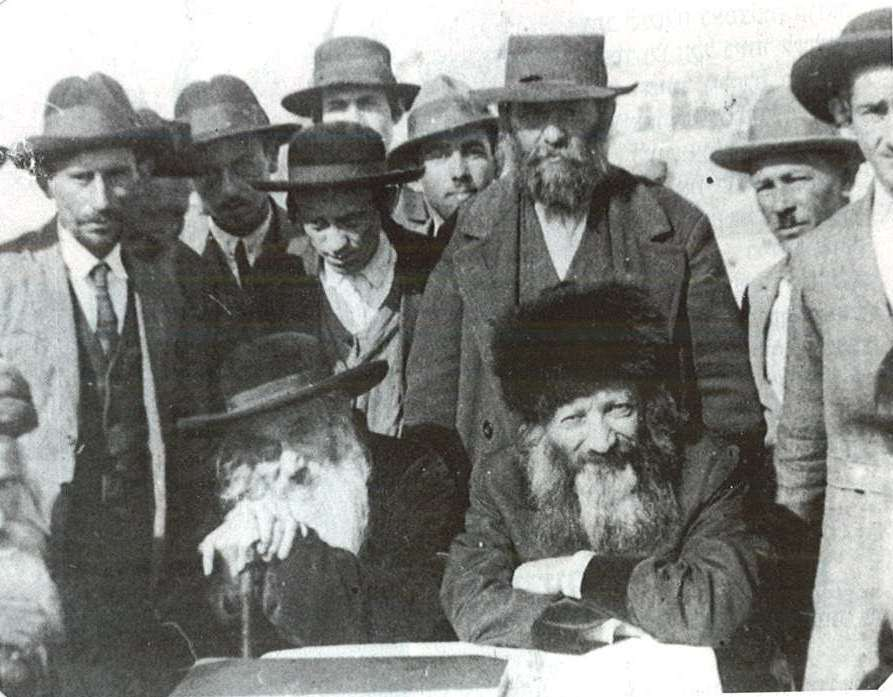
Kook and Sonnenfeld

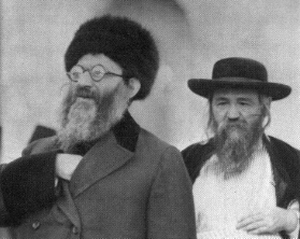
Kook and Frank

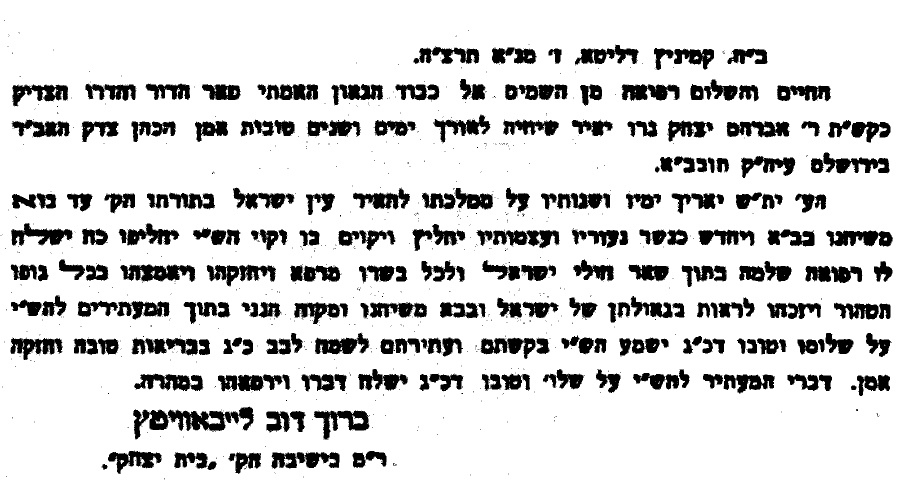
Letter of Boruch Ber Leibowitz about Kook

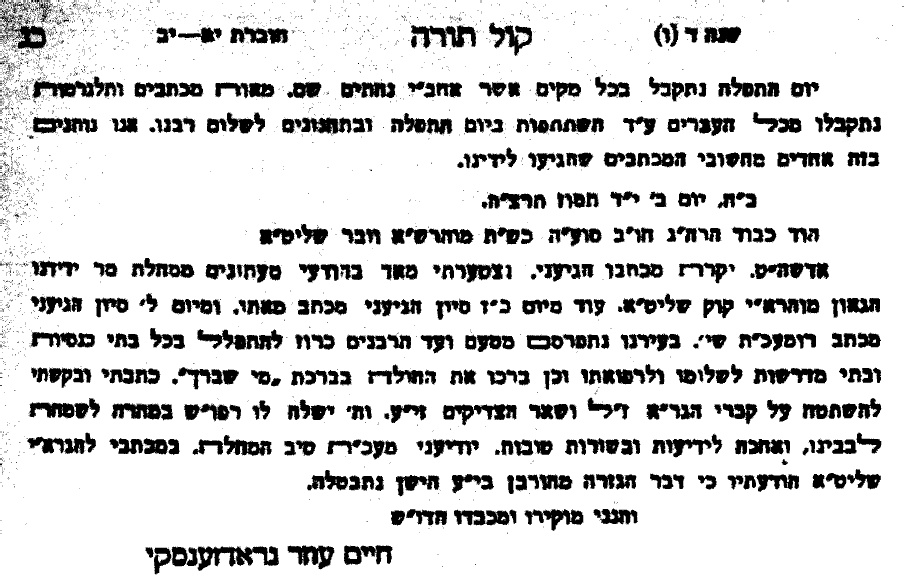
Letter of Chaim Ozer Grodzinsky about Kook

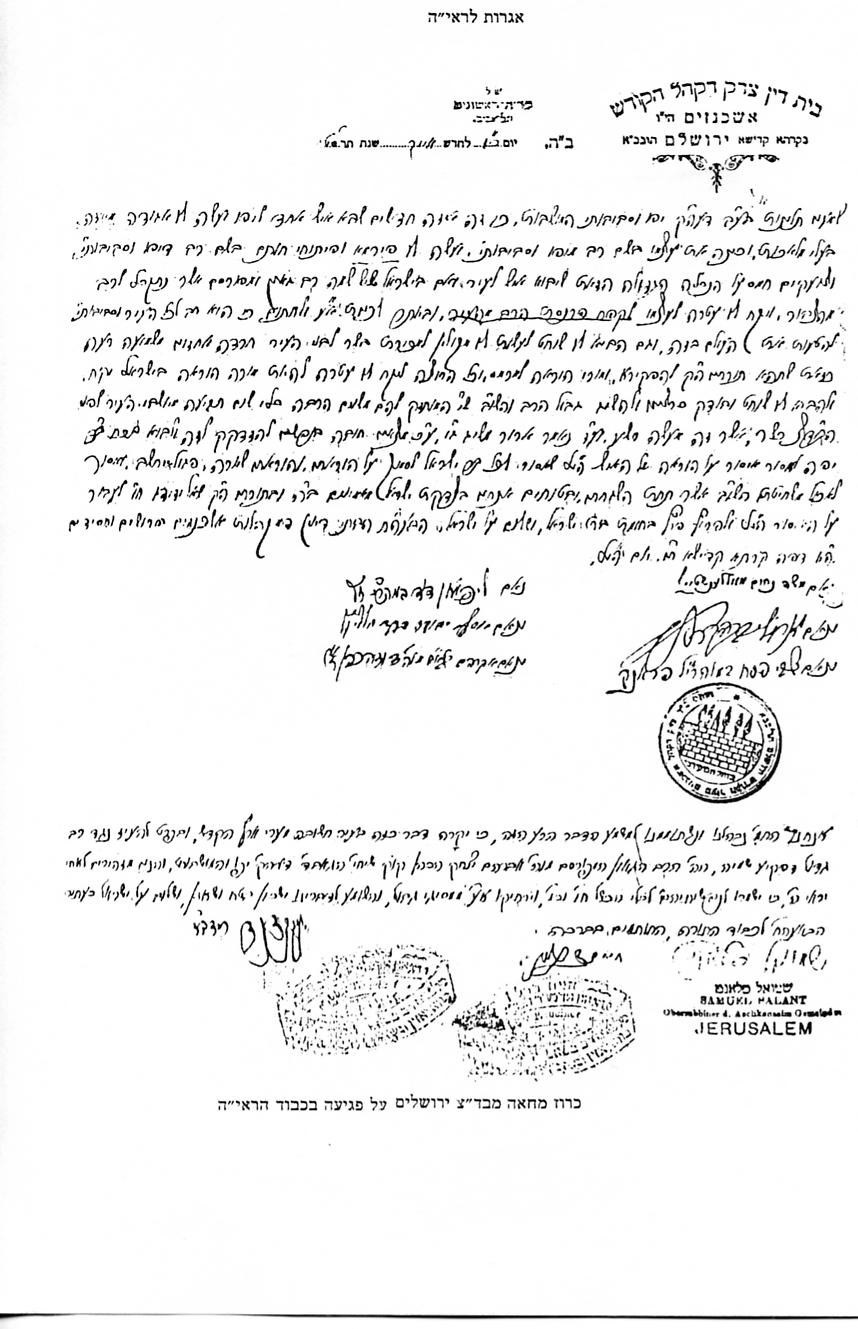
Badatz Eidah Chareidis writing In support and Defense of Kook

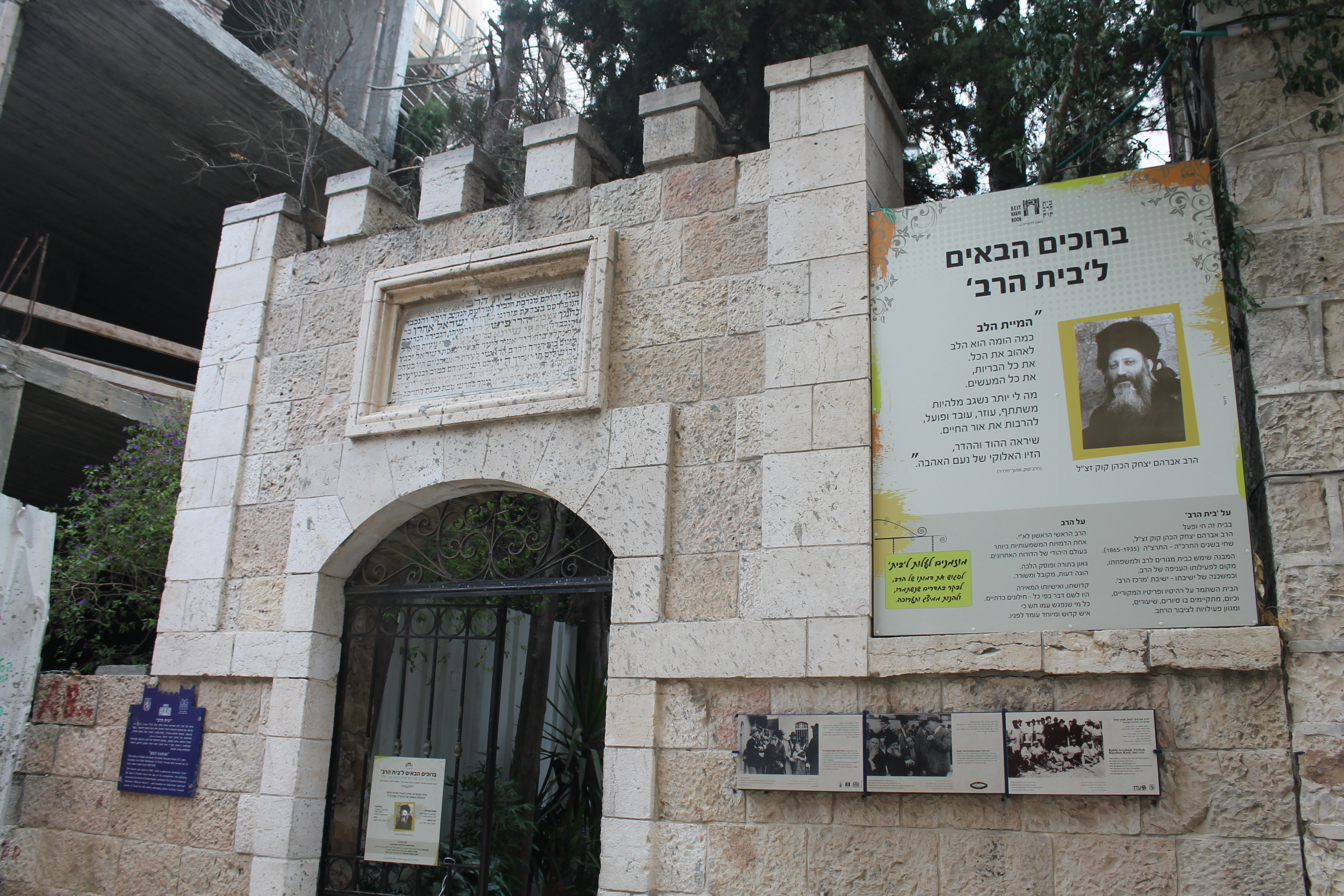
Main entrance of Kook's house in Jerusalem, Israel

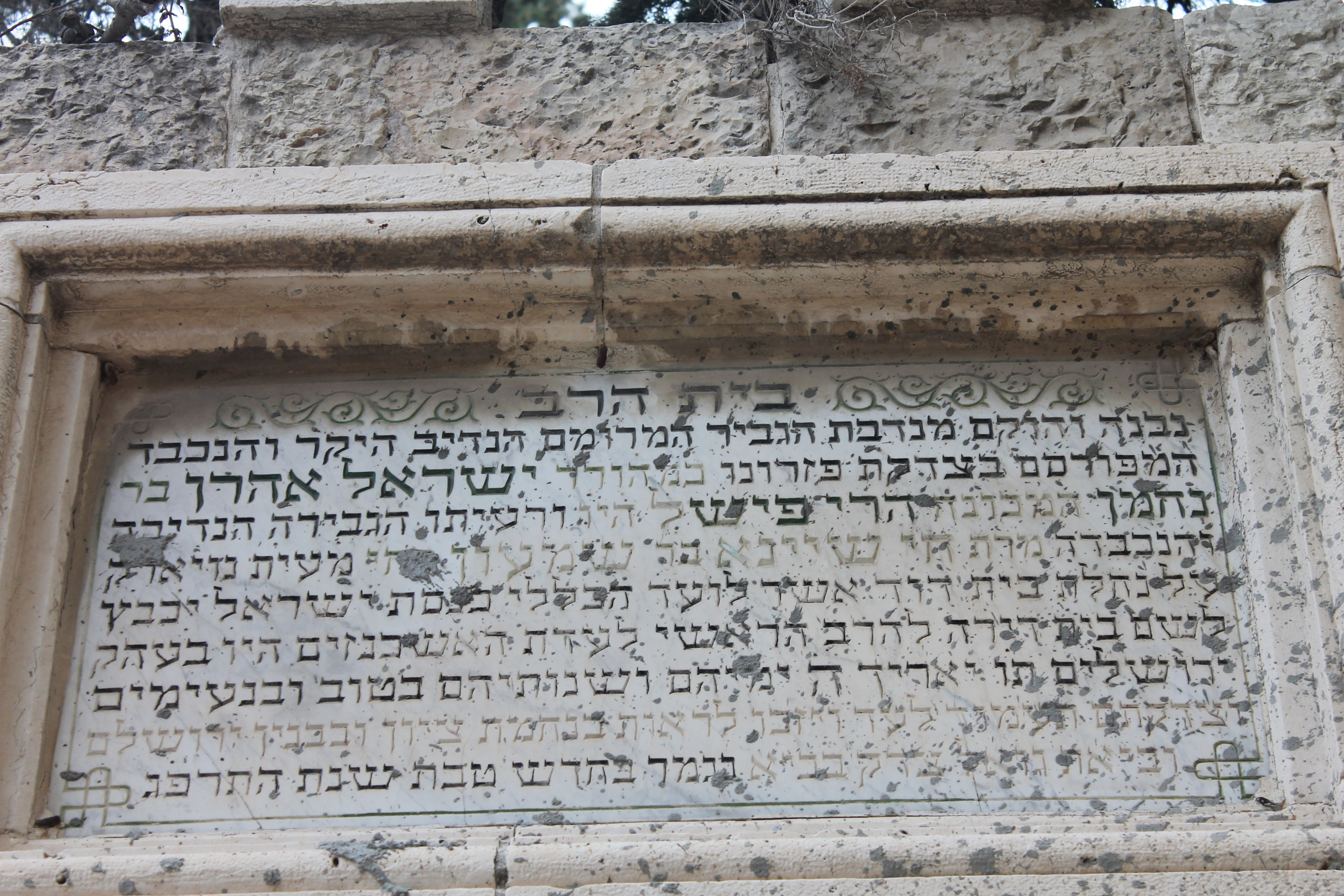
Stone carving above door where Kook lived when he was the Chief Rabbi in the 1920s and 30s.

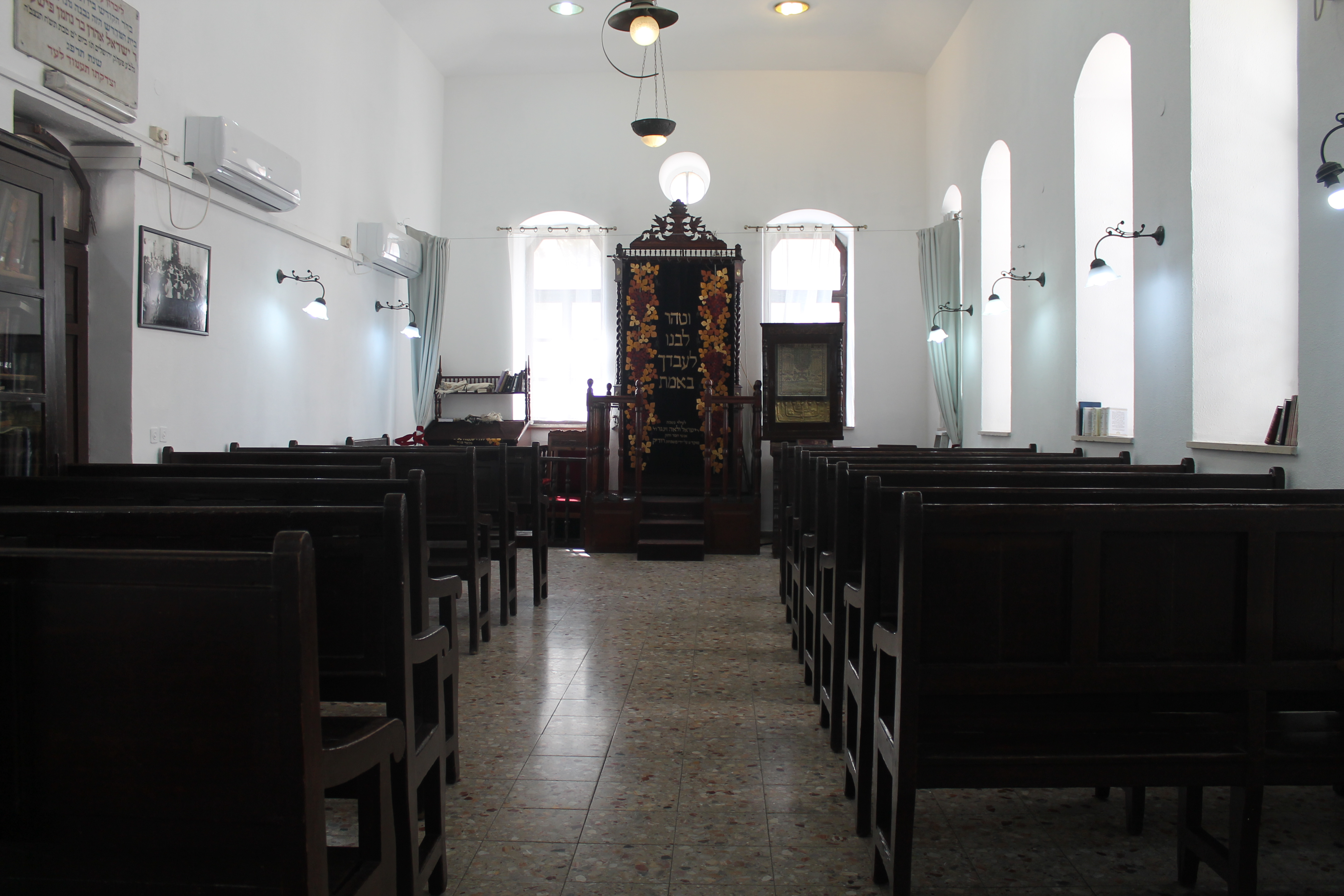
Interior view of the part of Kook's house used for Yeshiva Mercaz HaRav as well as synagogue.

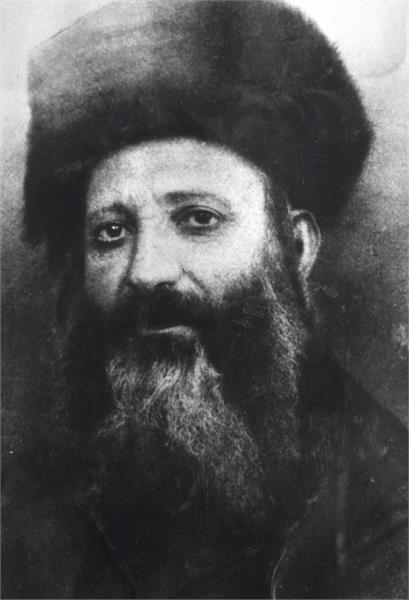
Rabbi Kook in 1920

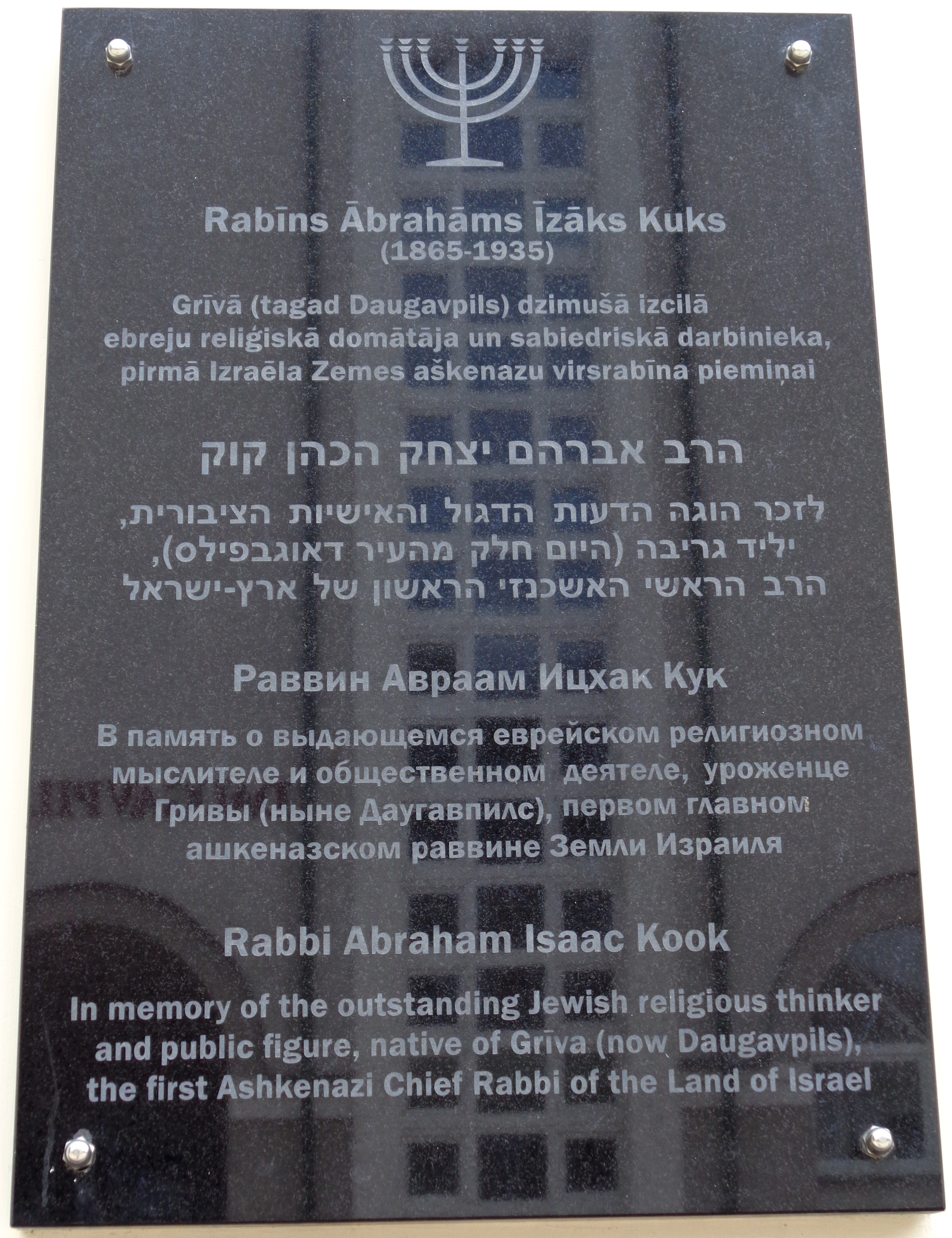
Memorial Plaque in Daugavpils, Latvia

== See also ==
- Hardal
- Religious Zionism
- Torat Eretz Yisrael
- Hebrew Universalism

== Notes ==
Jewish titles
New title	Ashkenazi Chief Rabbi of Mandatory Palestine; 1921–35	Succeeded by Yitzhak HaLevi Herzog
New title	Rosh Yeshiva of Yeshivat Mercaz HaRav Kook; 1921–35	Succeeded by Zvi Yehuda Kook
