= Chanoch Sanhedrai =

Haredi rabbinic judge in Israel

Rabbi Chanoch Sanhedrai (left), Chief Rabbi David Lau (middle), and Rabbi Avraham Sherman (seated) giving certificates of completion to students who passed examinations for rabbinic ordination.

Rabbi Chanoch Sanhedrai (Hebrew: חנוך סנהדראי) is a Haredi posek, dayan (rabbinic judge) and rosh kollel (dean) in Ramat Bet Shemesh. Sanhedrai specializes in Jewish civil law and serves as the chief justice of the rabbinical court Chukas Mishpat. He also heads Beis Dov Ber v-Refoel, a Kollel which focuses on the study of Choshen Mishpat.

He authored the multi-volume work Dvar Chok u-Mishpat in Hebrew which deals with many practical cases of Jewish civil law and offers original decisions. His work is cited by many other scholars. Some of his other writings on Jewish family law (Even HaEzer) were published in 2009 thanks to a grant from the Memorial Foundation for Jewish Culture . He also edits a monthly pamphlet entitled Alon Dvar Chok u-Mishpat which offers original insights to Jewish law written by Sanhedrai and his students.

He has previously served as a senior lecturer at the Yanar Institute in Jerusalem. In June 2014, it was reported that Rabbi Sanhedrai was on the short-list of potential appointments to a judicial position on the esteemed court of the Chief Rabbinate of Israel.
