= Yoreh De'ah =

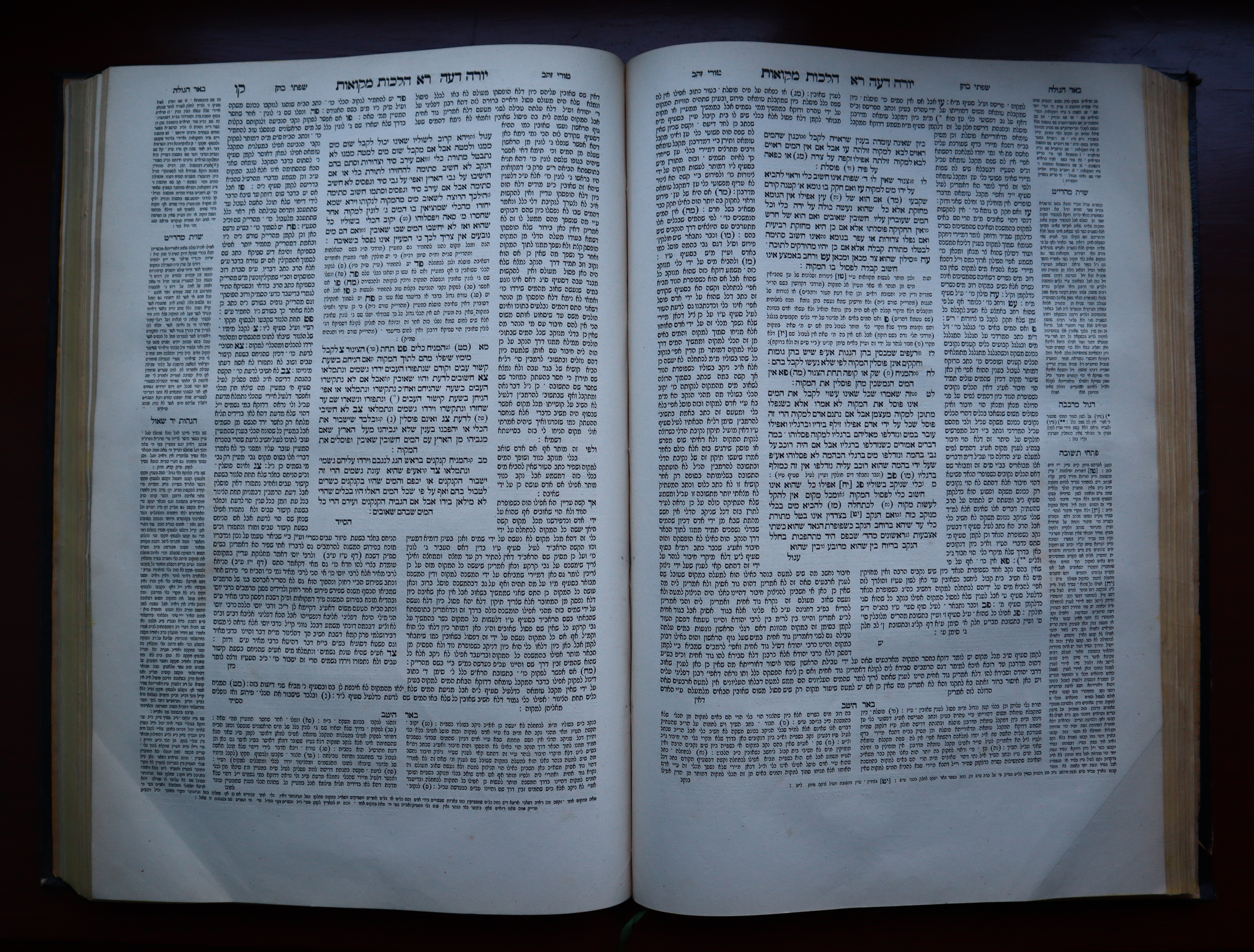
Yoreh Deah, Shulchan Aruch; 1864 print.

Topics include, but are not limited to:
- Permitted and forbidden foods,
- Circumcision,
- Gentiles,
- Foreign worship,
- Prohibition against charging interest,
- Oaths,
- Converts,
- Honoring parents,
- Honoring scholars and the elderly,
- Charity,
- Torah study,
- Torah scrolls,
- Mezuzah scrolls,
- Sending away the mother bird to take the young,
- Eating new grain,
- Forbidden mixtures (such as shatnez).
- Redeeming the firstborn,
- Excommunication,
- Visiting the sick,
- Mourning,
- Priestly tithes,
- Prohibition against tattooing.

Yoreh De'ah (Hebrew: יורה דעה) is a section of Rabbi Jacob ben Asher's compilation of halakha (Jewish law), the Arba'ah Turim, written around 1300.

This section treats all aspects of Jewish law not pertinent to the Hebrew calendar, finance, torts, marriage, divorce, or sexual conduct. (Nevertheless, there exists occasional overlap other areas). Yoreh De'ah is therefore the most diversified area of Jewish law; see aside.

Later, Rabbi Yosef Karo modeled the framework of his own compilation of practical Jewish law, the Shulchan Aruch, after the Arba'ah Turim. Many later commentators used this framework, as well. Thus, Yoreh De'ah in common usage may refer to the latter work. Ben Asher's Yoreh De'ah was also a key source for Ha-Agur (The Collection) by Jacob ben Judah Landau.

== See also ==
- 613 mitzvot
- The other three sections of Arba'ah Turim and other works borrowing its organizational scheme are:
  - Orach Chayim
  - Choshen Mishpat
  - Even HaEzer
