= Joshua Falk =

Polish rabbi (1555 – 1614)

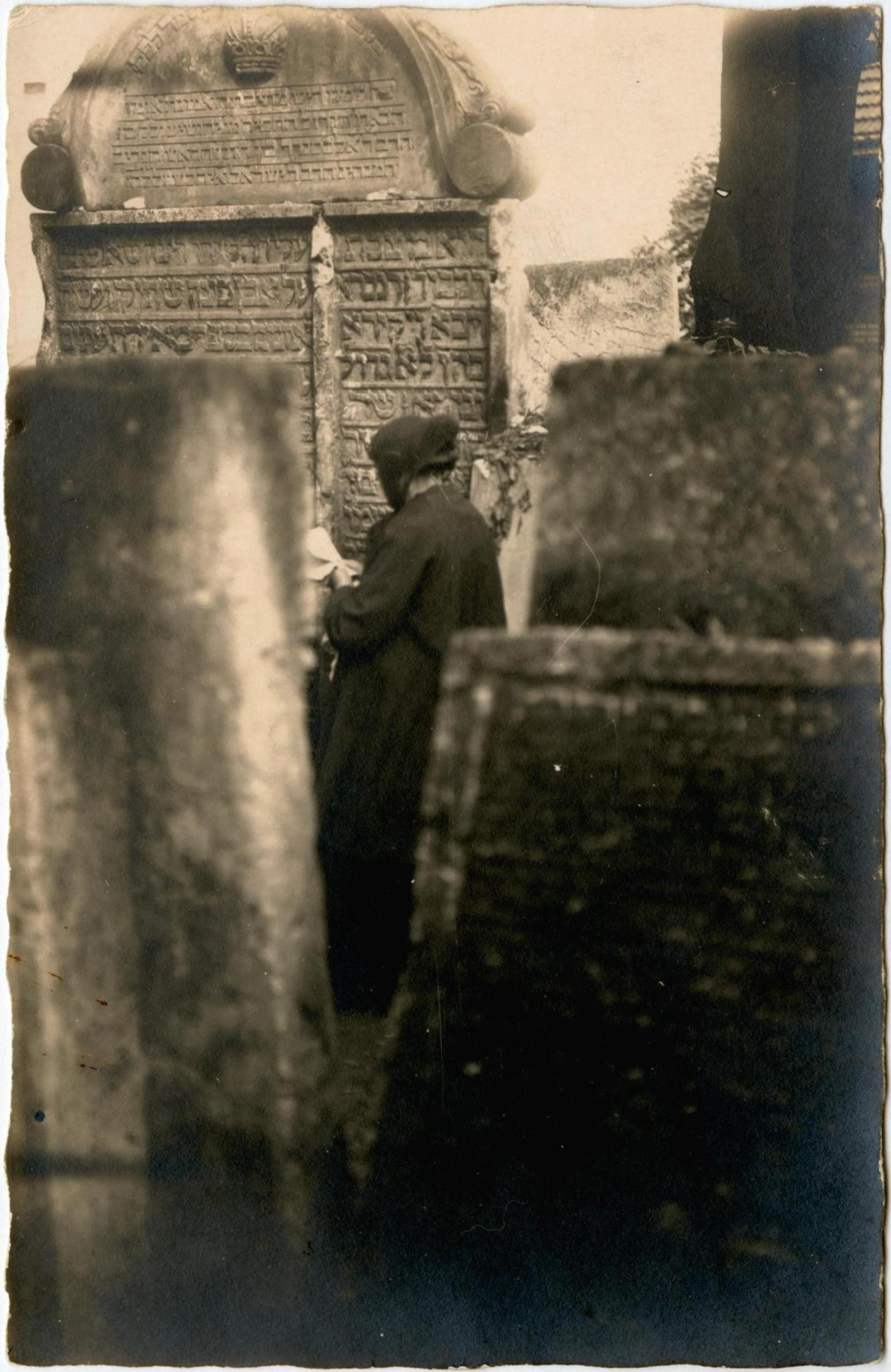
Woman at the tombstone of Joshua Falk in the Old Jewish cemetery in Lwow (1920s).

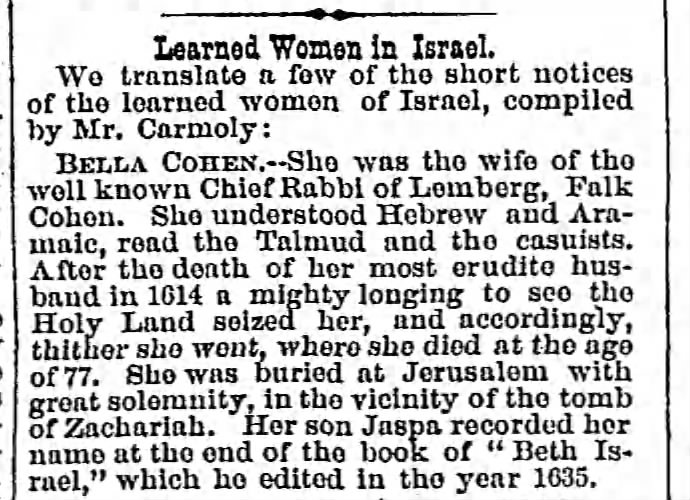
The American Israelite describes the scholarship of "Bella Cohen" (Bayla Falk), wife of Joshua Falk

Yehoshua ben Alexander HaCohen Falk (1555 – 29 March 1614) was a Polish Halakhist and Talmudist, best known as the author of the Drisha and Prisha commentaries on the Arba'ah Turim as well as Sefer Me'irat Enayim (סמ"ע) on Shulkhan Arukh. His name also occurs as the Hebrew acronyms רפ"כ ("RaFaC") ("Rabbi Falk Cohen"), מהרו"כ ("Ma-HaRWaC") ("Morenu ha-Rav Walk Cohen"), and מהר"י כ"ץ (MaHaRY KTz Morenu ha-Rav Joshua Katz).

== Biography ==
He was a pupil of his relative Moses Isserles and of Solomon Luria, and became the head of the yeshiva of Lemberg. Many celebrated rabbis were his pupils, among them being Joshua Höschel ben Joseph of Kraków, the author of Maginei Shlomo. Falk was a great authority on rabbinical matters. At the meeting of the Council of Four Lands in 1607, during the Kremenetz fair, many of his proposals were approved.

In 1611 Falk and Enoch Hendel ben Shemariah issued a bill of divorce at Vienna which occasioned lengthy discussions among the celebrated rabbis of the time, including Meir Lublin and Mordecai Yoffe. He was Rosh Yeshiva in Lemberg and served on the Council of Four Lands.

Falk was opposed to the reliance on law codes to the exclusion of study of the original sources. Towards this end he composed a series of commentaries on the most influential codes, Rabbi Jacob ben Asher's Tur and Rabbi Joseph Karo's Shulkhan Arukh. He spent his early life composing extensive analytical commentaries on the Talmud, which were later lost in a fire.

Falk died at Lemberg, in the Polish–Lithuanian Commonwealth on 29 March 1614.

=== Note on the name "Joshua Falk" ===
Until the early 19th century, the names of most Central European Jews consisted of a Hebrew first name, a German second name, the patronymic "ben ... " (son of ...) and, if an upper one, the class - HaCohen (or "Katz") or HaLevy. The German name was chosen to fit the Hebrew one: thus "Zvi" or "Naftali" went with "Hirsch", and "Zev" or "Binjamin" with "Wolf". Those whose given name was Yehoshua, Josua, or Joshua had the second name of Falk, Valk, Walk, Wallik or Wallich. (One theory is that "Falk", here, derives from the German for falcon: just as a falcon circles its prey, so Joshua circled and explored the Holy Land before swooping down on it. Some derive "Valk" from an acronym of Leviticus 19:18: "ve'ahavta lere'akha kamokha" - "Love thy neighbor as thyself"). The name Falk was thus not a family name until the 19th century, when it was adopted by those whose immediate ancestors had "Falk" as a second name. Encyclopedias will therefore have several entries under "Falk", where "Falk", strictly, is not a surname. References to Rabbi Falk are therefore often via "Yehoshua Falk ben Alexander HaCohen" or "Joshua Falk ben Alexander Katz" or "Joshua Falk Katz".

== Works ==
Beit Yisrael is a twin commentary on the Tur, composed of the Perishah, a straightforward explanation, and the Derishah, deeper discussions on specific problems. The Perishah clarifies the rulings of the Tur, by tracing them to their sources in the Talmud and Rishonim. The Derishah is devoted to extensive analysis and comparison of the various interpretations and decisions proposed by various Talmudic authorities.

Rabbi Falk also wrote:

- Sefer Me'irat Einayim, a commentary to the Choshen Mishpat section of the Shulkhan Arukh, containing all the decisions of the Rishonim, with an index of their sources.
- Sefer ha-Hosafah, a supplement to the Darhkei Mosheh of Moses Isserles, printed with the Choshen Mishpat, Dyhernfurth, 1796;
- Kontres 'al Diney Ribbit, a discourse on the laws relating to the prohibition of usury, followed by some takkanot (ordinances by the Rabbis), Sulzbach, 1692;
- Novellae on Talmudic treatises.
