= Asher Parenzo =

Asher ben Jacob Parenzo (Hebrew: אשר בן יעקב פורינץ; fl. 1580–1600) was a Hebrew printer in Venice.

== Biography ==
Parenzo was a member of a prominent printing family, which included his brother Meir, one of the best-known Jewish printers of the period. Their father Jacob, also a printer, was a native of Parenzo om Venetian Dalmatia.

He was employed by Giovanni Bragadin in printing a large number of works of Hebrew literature, among them Isaac Abravanel's commentary on the Pentateuch (1579), the Tanakh (1586), and the fourth part of the Turim (1594).
