= Shaul Yedidya Shochet =

Personal life
- Born: 17 August 1860 Žagarė, Kovno Governorate, Russian Empire
- Died: 23 December 1925 (aged 65) Chicago, United States

Religious life
- Religion: Judaism

Shaul Yedidya Shochet (Hebrew: שאול ידידיה שוחט; 17 August 1860 – 23 December 1925) was a Lithuanian-born Orthodox rabbi and posek who served in Lithuania, England, and the United States. He was the author of six works of responsa, Talmudic novellae, and homiletics, and was active during the period of mass Eastern European Jewish immigration to the United States.

== Early life and education ==
Shochet was born on 17 August 1860 in Old Zhager, in the Kovno Governorate of the Russian Empire, into a family of rabbis and ritual slaughterers. His father, Avraham Chaim Shochet, served the town as a shochet, cantor, and halakhic authority, and authored Tiferet Chaim, a work of Talmudic novellae later printed together with his son's first book. A great-great-uncle, Eliyahu of Dialtetz, author of Shnei Eliyahu on Avot of Rabbi Natan, was known as a kabbalist.

He studied at the Volozhin Yeshiva during the tenure of Rabbi Naftali Zvi Yehuda Berlin, and was ordained by Rabbi Yitzchak Elchanan Spektor of Kovno.

== Rabbinic career ==
=== Lithuania and England ===
Shochet began his rabbinic career in Karklėnai (Karklan) in the Kovno Governorate; an approbation by Rabbi Shmuel Yaakov Rabinowitz of Yelok to his Beit Yedidya refers to him as rabbi of Karklan. According to Ohalei Shem, he served in additional Lithuanian towns. While in Lithuania he published his first works in Piotrków; by his own account, Tiferet Shaul was printed twice due to demand.

He then served as a rabbi in Hull, England, a port city through which many Eastern European Jews passed en route to America.

=== United States ===
In the early 20th century Shochet emigrated to the United States, holding rabbinic positions in Perth Amboy, New Jersey, Kansas City, Missouri, and Louisville, Kentucky, before settling in Chicago. Frequent movement between communities across regions with few ordained Orthodox rabbis was characteristic of the first generation of immigrant rabbis.

In Chicago he led Congregation Beth Aaron, and from about 1922 Congregation Beth Israel, serving until his death on 23 December 1925.

=== Family ===
Shochet's first wife, Figa Dina, was a daughter of Rabbi Shmuel Yitzchak Horowitz of Kretingen. The couple had three children, whom Shochet names in Ahavat Shaul. She died in 1917, and he eulogized her in the third volume of that work; he later remarried, to Dobe, daughter of Shraga Pavies.

== Halakhic work ==
Shochet's halakhic writing centered on Even HaEzer, particularly the laws of divorce and agunot — a pressing issue in immigrant communities, where wives were frequently left without husbands who had emigrated. His responsa document correspondence with rabbis across the United States, including Tobias Geffen of Atlanta, Zvi Hirsch Grodzinsky of Omaha, Dov Ber Abramowitz and Yosef Zechariah Rosenfeld of St. Louis, and Mordechai Shlomo Siber of Minneapolis. His responsa are cited in later halakhic literature, including in the works of Rabbi Ovadia Yosef.

== Recognition ==
Rabbi Zvi Hirsch Grodzinsky of Omaha described Shochet in his works as "one of the great rabbis of Chicago" and as a colleague with whom he corresponded on matters of Jewish law. His books were reviewed in the contemporary Yiddish-American press; a 1918 review in the Yidishe Gazeten described him as "a great scholar" (a groyser lamdan). The Posen Library includes a biographical entry on him and reproduces one of his sermons, noting that his writings were "popular in Europe."

== Works ==
- Tiferet Shaul (Piotrków, 1899) – Talmudic novellae, in three volumes.
- Beit Yedidya (Piotrków, 1907) – responsa, with approbations from Rabbi Abraham Isaac Kook, Rabbi Yaakov Dovid Wilovsky (the Ridvaz), and Rabbi Shmuel Yaakov Rabinowitz.
- Ahavat Shaul (1915–1918) – homilies on the Torah, in three volumes.
- Birkat Shaul (Chicago, 1919) – on tractates Megillah and Kiddushin.
- Tiferet Yedidya (St. Louis, 1920) – responsa on Even HaEzer, chiefly on divorce and agunot.
- Chochmat Yedidya (St. Louis, 1923) – responsa and novellae; published, by his own account, without approbations.
