= Jacob ben Judah Landau =

German-Italian rabbi (died 1493)

Jacob ben Judah Landau (died 1493) (Hebrew: יעקב ברוך בן יהודה לנדא) was a German-Italian rabbi and halakhic codifier, who wrote the halakhic digest The Agur (האגור).

== Biography ==
Landau lived in the second half of the 15th century. His father was one of the chief authorities on the Talmud in Germany; hundreds of Talmudists, among them naturally his son, were his pupils. Landau left Germany and settled in Italy, living first in Pavia (1480) and then in Naples (1487).

== Works ==
In Naples, some time between 1487 and 1492, he published his code Agur. He composed this for his pupil Ezra Abraham b. David Obadiah, because, the latter's time being devoted to physics and metaphysics, he could not enter deeply into the study of the Talmud (see introduction to Agur). This practical consideration determined the form of the Agur, which contains only those rules that a layman should know, and comprises principally an abridged presentation of the material treated in the first and second parts of the Turim. The author of the Turim, Jacob ben Asher, is Landau's chief authority, and the Agur may be considered really as a supplement to that work. In the Agur, Landau gives excerpts from the halakhic literature which appeared after the time of Jacob ben Asher.

Although the Agur possesses little originality, it held an important position among law codes, and is often quoted, especially by Joseph Caro in the Shulchan Aruch. German influence on the religious practices of the Italians was increased by Landau's work, such authorities as Jacob Mölin, Isserlein, and other Germans having been little noticed by Italians before him. The Agur was the first Jewish work to contain a Haskama (rabbinical approbation), besides being the second Hebrew book printed during the author's lifetime.

At the end of the Agur, Landau gave a number of conundrums relating to halakhah, under the title "Sefer Chazon," which were afterward published separately (Venice, 1546; Prague, 1608).

At the end of the preface the author explains three reasons for naming it the 'Agur. The senses of Agur he used are (1) hunkering, referring to his humility; (2) a heap, as it is a collected digest; and (3) dwelling, referring to the "tents of Shem" which represent Torah study (Gen. 9).
