= Pinchas Polonsky =

Russian-Israeli religious philosopher (born 1958)

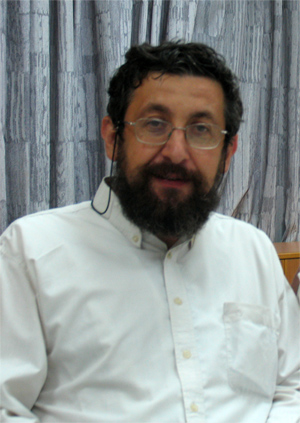
Pinchas Polonsky

Pinchas Polonsky (Hebrew: פנחס פולונסקי, Russian: Полонский Пётр (Пинхас) Ефимович; born 11 February 1958) is a Russian-Israeli Jewish-religious philosopher, researcher, and educator active among the Russian-speaking Jewish community. He has written original books and a number of translations of works on Judaism.

During his underground activities in Moscow (1977–1987), he taught Judaism and was one of the founders of Machanaim. He lives in Israel, is an activist in the process of the modernization of Judaism and is a researcher on the topics of Rav Kook. Polonsky is the author of a commentary on the Torah under the title "Bible Dynamics". Polonsky initiated EJWiki, an academic encyclopedia on Jewish and Israeli topics.

== Biography ==
Born 1958 in Moscow into a family of secular assimilated Jews, he attended Special Math School No. 7 with a focus on math and physics. Upon graduating in 1975 a decision to leave the Soviet Union and move to Israel took shape. He began to study Hebrew in a clandestine group, and then subsequently Torah and Judaism.

Between 1975 and 1980 Polonsky studied mathematics at the Moscow State Pedagogical Institute.

Starting in 1979 Polonsky became one of the founders of a clandestine network for the study of Torah in Moscow. He was involved in Samizdat, publishing (through photocopying) guides for observing Judaism and maintaining a Jewish lifestyle, including a series of books on Jewish holiday observance and Torah commentaries.

After applying for immigration to Israel, Polonsky became a refusenik for 7 years and finally immigrated to Israel in 1987 at the onset of the Perestroika. Rabbi Polonsky has been living in Beit El since 1991., in Jerusalem since 2022. On January 18, 2026 on his Facebook page he announced moving to Karmiel.

== Education and academic work ==
1975: Master's degree in mathematics and education, Moscow State Pedagogical Institute.

1987: one of the initiators in the founding of the Israeli branch of Machanaim; remained a faculty member and editor-in-chief until 2012.

1989–1990: attended Yeshiva "Machon Harry Fischel" in Jerusalem.

1994–1997: attended Yeshiva Beit Morasha, Jerusalem, majoring in Jewish philosophy.

1995–1999: attended Bar-Ilan University in Ramat Gan, faculty of Jewish studies; received an MA in Talmudic Studies.

In 2002 Polonsky obtained a PhD in Sociology of Religion. His thesis was: "Sociological Concepts in R. Kook's Teachings".

1991–2012: taught at the Bar-Ilan University.

2012–2013: Senior Fellow and Assistant Professor at Ariel University in the West Bank.

== Series of prayer books with commentaries ==
This initiative launched by Pinchas Polonsky began with an underground edition of the Pesach Haggadah with commentaries in the 1980s in Moscow. The Haggadah was published using photocopying equipment and distributed in hundreds of copies across Moscow and other major cities of the former Soviet Union. This Hagadah was meant to instruct in leading an exciting and spiritual Seder.

In Israel Polonsky together with Machanaim published: a Siddur (prayer book) with a Russian translation and commentaries titled "Vrata Molitvy" (Gates of Prayer, not to be confused with the Reform "Gates of Prayer, the New Union Prayer Book"). Until this day it remains the most widely used prayer book in Russian; a transliterated edition is also available); Machzor "Gates of Repentance" for Rosh Hashanah and Yom Kippur; Passover Haggadah with commentaries; a book titled "Obligations of the Living", on the Laws of Mourning, as well as a series of books about Jewish holiday customs and observance.

== Research of Rav Kook's legacy ==
In 1991 Polonsky partnered with Rav Kook's Home Residence Museum in Jerusalem and prepared the publishing of a compilation of Rav Kook's works titled "Tolerance in the Teaching of R. Kook".

During the course of his research of Rav Kook's philosophy and body of work, he wrote and published a study (monograph) titled "Rav Abraham Isaac Kook. Life and Teaching". In 2009 the main chapters of the book were translated and published in English, and in 2013 into Hebrew. It became the first book on Jewish religious thought translated from Russian to Hebrew. The book was approved by several major rabbinical authorities on the subject of Rav Kook's philosophy and was recommended by them to be included in the Religious Zionist academic curriculum.

== Torah commentaries "Bible Dynamics" ==
A series of books presenting a new commentary to the Torah, based on the Kabbalistic concepts of R. I. L. Ashkenazi (Manitou) and on new findings of R. Uri Sherki, which included the author's own original concepts and interpretations.

As of March 2020, a full commentary on the Torah (11 books) have been published. An English translation of Genesis, Part A, "Be Reshit - Chayei Sarah" has been published in the fall of 2019, and Genesis 2 and Exodus were published in 2020. The first part of Genesis in Ukrainian has been published in 2019 as well.

== Other works ==
In 2009 Polonsky became one of the founders of an Academic wiki-encyclopedia on Jewish and Israeli topics. The goal of the project is the publication of a complementary (to Wikipedia and other sources), academically viable information on Judaism, Jews and Israel on the Russian-language Internet.

Polonsky is the initiator and coordinator for the project "Preserving the Memory", whose purpose is to preserve the memory of the Jewish-Zionist underground movement in the USSR. He is also the founder of the "Fight Against Intellectual Antisemitism" project.

In 2022 Polonsky published Siddur with Russian translation, transliteration and audio.

== Religious views and philosophy ==
Polonsky attributes himself to the radically modernist wing of religious Zionism, whose essence is the orthodox modernization of Judaism; in other words, an active modernization with strict adherence to an orthodox Jewish approach. In this he sees himself as a follower of Rav Kook and a partner to R. Uri Cherki.

Polonsky supports an integration of universal ideas into religion creating a healthy symbiosis. He views modernization of religion as an absolute religious necessity and prerequisite. He believes in the religious importance of science, art, democracy, and other universal secular values. Polonsky is a proponent of the initiative to introduce "a day of science" in Israeli high-school curricula, to demonstrate productive synergy which can be achieved by combining science and religion.

Polonsky is active in promoting ideas and concepts of Noahidism.

Polonsky is an advocate for access to and prayer at the Temple Mount for Jews.

Polonsky is the author of the concept of "Three Stages of the Arrival of the Messiah" (as opposed to the two-stage approach, widely accepted by religious Zionism today).

He introduced the concept of religious anti-fundamentalism; in other words, an opposition to religious fundamentalism based on the concepts of "continuing and organic revelation".

== Published works ==
- "Relationship Between Ideals and Commandments in Judaism" (with Galina Zolotusky, Gregory Yashgur, and Raphael BenLevil). Conversations: a journal of the Institute for Jewish Ideas and Ideals, issue 31, Spring 2018, NY. Pages 54–79 https://www.jewishideas.org/article/relationship-between-ideals-and-commandments-judaism
- "Rabbi Kook and the Modernization of Judaism". Conversations: A Journal of the Institute for Jewish Ideas and Ideals, issue 4, Spring 2009, NY. https://www.jewishideas.org/article/rabbi-kook-and-modernization-judaism-0
- Polonsky, Pinchas (2009). Religious Zionism of Rav Kook (1st ed.). Machanaim - Russian Jewish Edu. ISBN 978-9659144600. - opus magnum
- Polonsky, Pinchas (2009). Two stories of the World creation. Forefathers (Volume 1). CreateSpace Independent Publishing Platform. ISBN 978-1479161027.
- Polonsky, Pinchas (2010–2012). Forefathers' Dynamics. Vol. 1-4. CreateSpace Independent Publishing Platform. ISBN 978-1463763251.
- Polonsky, Pinchas (2012). Two thousand years together. Jewish view on Christianity. CreateSpace Independent Publishing Platform. ISBN 978-1475267600.
- Polonsky, Pinchas (2023). A jewish perspective on Christianity. Bowker (March 19, 2023). ISBN 978-1949900156.
- Polonsky, Pinchas (1987–1992). "Jewish Festivals": History and philosophy of Jewish Festivals. Machanaim - Russian Jewish Edu. - 8 books
- Polonsky, Pinchas (2012). Israel and humanity: Thoughts drawn from the Teachings of r. Kook, by rav Cherki (1st ed.). CreateSpace Independent Publishing Platform. ISBN 978-1475267648.
- "Gates of Prayer", A prayerbook with new Russian translation, commentaries and explanations, 1994
- Video and audio courses on problems of Judaism
- Creative audio and video guide for Passover celebration (no less than 30 000 copies)
- Pinchas Polonsky, Golda Akhiezer. Bnei Noah: History, Theory, and Practice
- Polonsky, Pinchas (2020). Bible Dynamics : evolving personalities and ideas : contemporary Torah commentary. Newton, MA: Orot Yerushalaim. ISBN 9781949900224. (3 volumes for Bereshit and Shemot)
