= HaEmunah =

Song written in the late 19th century by Abraham Isaac Kook

Haemunah (Hebrew: הַאמונה, lit. 'The Faith') is a song written in the late 19th century by Abraham Isaac Kook. It places the Torah as the central component of the Jewish People's return to its land (Eretz Yisrael), and sees this process as a bigger step for the redemption of Israel, and by extension the world.

== Words ==
Hebrew	Transliteration	English translation
לעד חיה בלבבנו האמונה הנאמנה לשוב אל ארץ קדשנו עיר בה דוד חנה.	Le'ad ḥayah bilvavenu ha'emunah hanne'emanah Lashuv el eretz q'doshenu Ir bah David ḥanah.	Eternally lives in our hearts, the loyal faith [Haemunah] to return to our holy land, the city where David settled.
שמה נעמוד לגורלנו אב המון קנה שמה נחיה חיינו חיי עדת מי מנה.	Shamah na'amod legoralenu 'av hamon qanah shamah niḥyeh ḥayeynu ḥayey adat mi manah.	There we shall stand [to receive] our destiny, [which the] father of many [nations] acquired, there we shall live our life the life of the innumerable community.
שמה נעבוד אלוקנו בחדוה בגילה וברננה שמה נעלה לרגלנו שלש פעמים בשנה.	Shamah na'avod Eloqenu beḥedwah begilah ubirenanah shamah na'aleh leraglenu shalosh pa'amim beshanah.	There we shall serve our God with joy, happiness and song there we shall pilgrimage three times a year.
תורת חיים חמדתנו מפי עליון ניתנה נצח היא נחלתנו ממדבר מתנה.	Torat ḥayyim ḥemdatenu mipi elyon nitnah netzaḥ hi' naḥalatenu mimidbar matanah.	Torah of life is our desire, given from heavenly mouth forever it is our heritage from the desert it was given.
