= Eliyahu David Rabinowitz-Teomim =

Lithuanian rabbi (1843–1905)

Eliyahu David Rabinowitz-Teomim אליהו דוד רבינוביץ-תאומים
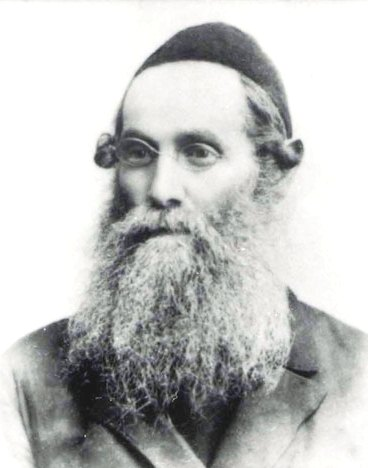

Personal life
- Born: 11 June 1845 Pikeliai, Russian Empire
- Died: 8 February 1905 (aged 59) Jerusalem, Ottoman Empire

Religious life
- Religion: Judaism

Elijah David Rabinowitz-Teomim (Hebrew: אליהו דוד רבינוביץ-תאומים; 11 June 1843—8 February 1905), also known by his acronym ADeReT, was a Lithuanian rabbi in the 19th century who served as the leader of the Jewish community of Panevėžys, as the rabbi of Mir, led the Ashkenazi community in Jerusalem, and published many brilliant original arguments in Torah jurisprudence.

== Biography ==
Rabinowitz-Teomim was born in the town of Pikeln. At the age of five his mother died and from then on, his father, Rabbi Benjamin Rabinowitz, raised him and his brother, Tzvi-Yehudah, alone. He studied Talmud and rabbinics under the tutelage of his father and by the age of fifteen he had acquired a substantial knowledge of Talmudic and rabbinic literature. Rabinowitz-Teomim was married to Feige Minna, with whom he had seven children. His daughter Batsheva married Rabbi Abraham Isaac Kook in 1886; however she died a few years later, whereupon Rabinowitz-Teomim encouraged Rabbi Kook to marry his niece (the daughter of his brother Tzvi-Yehudah). He encouraged Rabbi Kook to become the Chief Rabbi of Jaffa.

He died on 3 Adar 5665 (8 February 1905). He is buried on the Mount of Olives.

== Rabbinical career ==
In 1875, he was invited to serve the rabbinate of the town of Panevėžys (Poneviezh). In 1893, he was appointed as the Rosh Yeshiva of Mir, where he served until 1899. He then immigrated to Jerusalem. In 1901, he was appointed as assistant to the aging Rabbi Shmuel Salant, who was the chief rabbi of the Ashkenazi Perushim community in Jerusalem.

== Published works ==
Rabinowitz-Teomim was a prolific writer and penned over 120 books. His work includes original insights on Maimonides' Mishneh Torah, as well as on the Talmud in his works, "Ha-Tebunah," "Kebod ha-Lebanon," "Ha-Ẓofeh," "Ha-Maggid," "Keneset Ḥakme Yisrael," "'Iṭṭur Soferim," and "Keneset ha-Gedolah." Much of his work has also been disseminated alongside the works of others to whom he gave his approbation. Recently several publishing houses have decided to print his works, thereby spurring renewed interest in his thought. Some of these texts include, “Seder Eliyahu”, an autobiography, “Teffilat David”, an explication of the meaning of the Siddur, “Cheshbonos Shel Mitzvah”, an exposition on the 613 biblical commandments, “Seder Parshios”, a commentary on the weekly portion of the Torah, “Zecher Lemikdash”, a work concerning rabbinic precepts intended to be observed as a remembrance of the Temple, and many others.

== Legacy ==
Several centres of Torah education throughout Israel are named after Rabinowitz-Teomim, such as Yeshivat Bnei Akiva Aderet high school in the city of Bat Yam.
