= Choshen Mishpat =

Rabbinic legal text by Jacob ben Asher

Choshen Mishpat (Hebrew: חושן משפט) is the Hebrew for "Breastplate of Judgement". The term is associated with one of the four sections of Rabbi Jacob ben Asher's compilation of halakha (Jewish law), Arba'ah Turim. This section treats aspects of Jewish law pertinent to finance, torts, legal procedure and loans and interest in Judaism. Later, Rabbi Yosef Karo modeled the framework of his own compilation of practical Jewish law, the Shulkhan Arukh, after the Arba'ah Turim. Many later commentators used this framework as well. Thus, Choshen Mishpat in common usage may refer to an area of halakha, non-specific to Rabbi Jacob ben Asher's compilation.

== See also ==
The other three sections of Arba'ah Turim and other works borrowing its organizational scheme are:

- Orach Chayim
- Yoreh De'ah
- Even HaEzer
