= Machanaim =

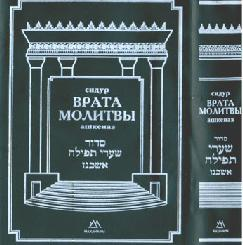
Prayerbook "Gates of Prayer", published by Machanaim, 1998.

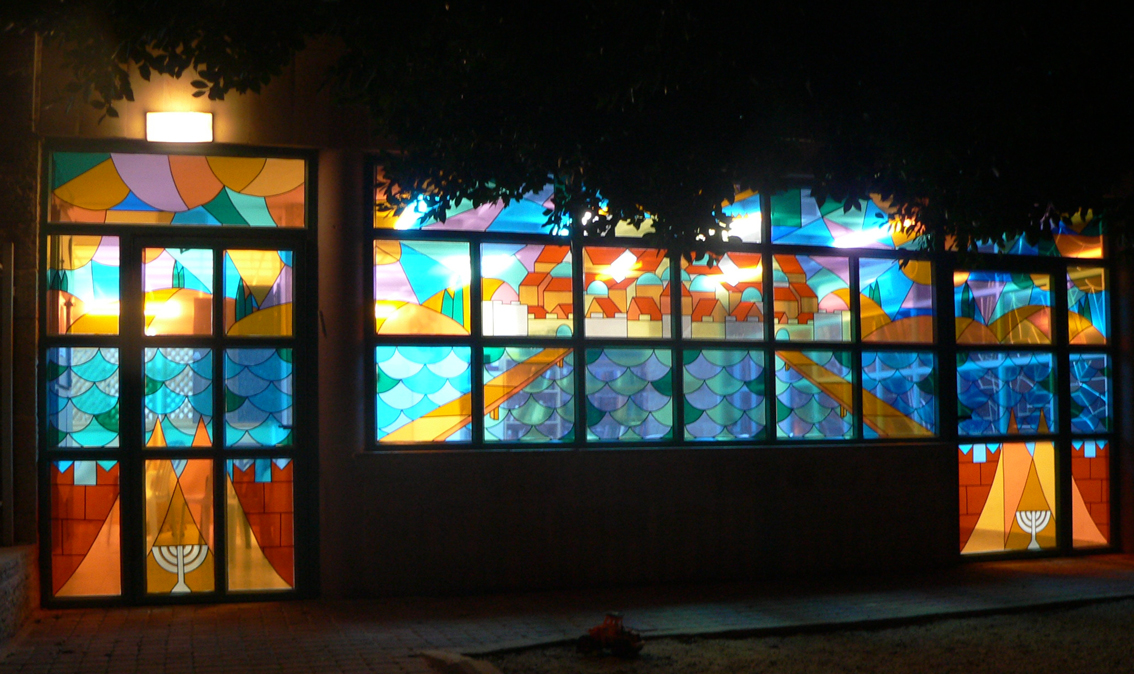
Design of the frontal wall of synagogue with the symbol of Machanaim by Michael Yahilevich

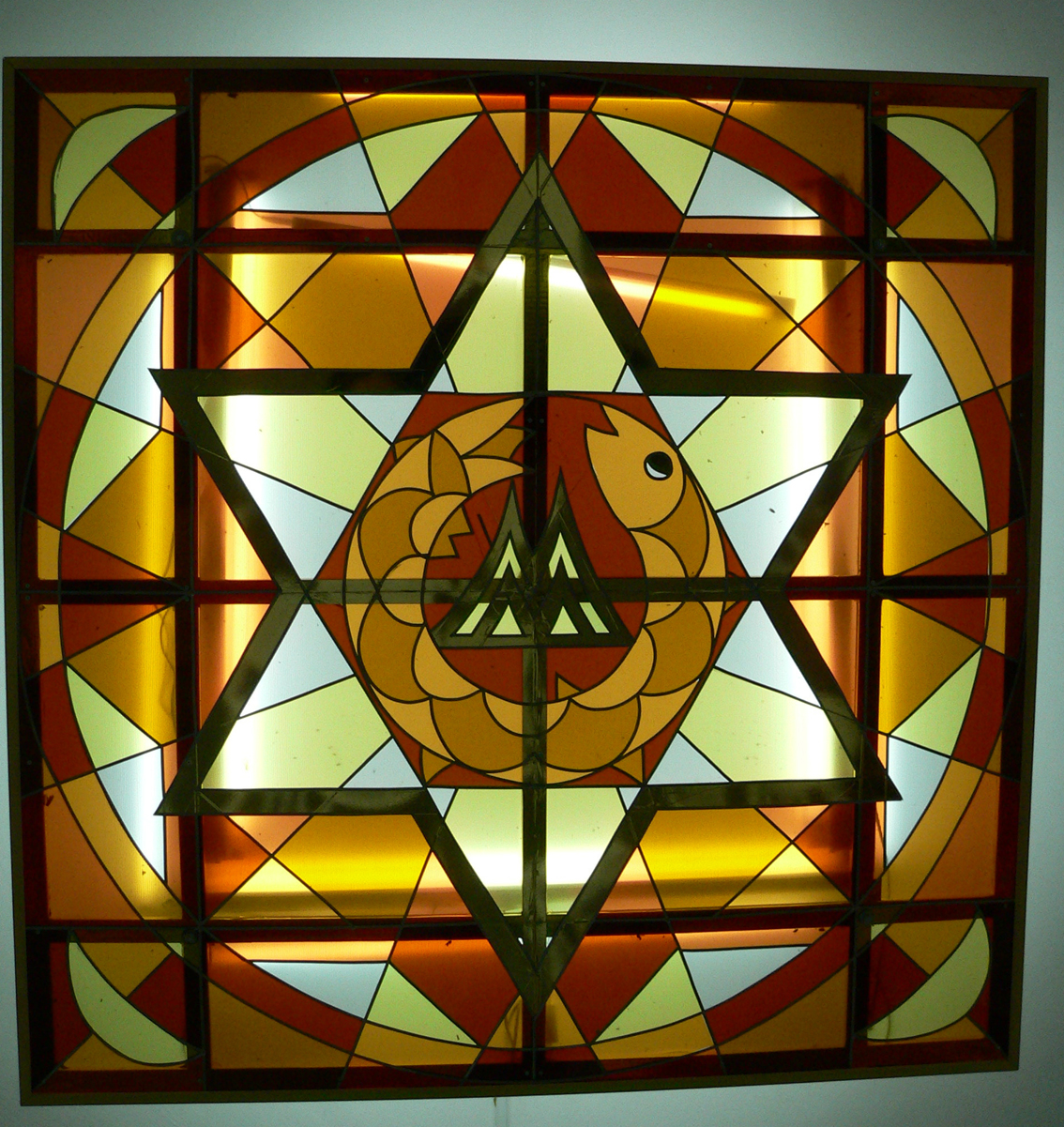
Lamp, Leviathan keeps guard at Machanaim synagogue

Machanaim is an organization dealing with the spiritual absorption of Jewish people from the former USSR in Israel. The movement's work and its goals spawned its name, the Hebrew word מַחֲנָיִם from Genesis 32:3 meaning "two camps", in this case referring to Jerusalem and Moscow.

Machanaim's founders are Rabbi Dr. Zeev Dashevsky, Dr. Pinchas Polonsky, and Dr. Michael Kara-Ivanov. Machanaim began in Moscow behind the Iron Curtain in 1979, during the period of Brezhnev stagnation, as a group of young people who gathered to study Jewish history and tradition and pass on this knowledge on to their fellow Jews. Over time it developed into an organized underground network for studying Torah, Jewish philosophy, and Jewish law. Almost all the group members were refuseniks. Classes were sometimes interrupted by the KGB.

In 1987 most of the Machanaim activists received permission to emigrate to Israel. There they set two main goals: to work with new immigrants and to provide assistance in Jewish education for those Jews still in the CIS.

The organization has produced many books and classes, especially for conversion to Judaism. Its other main projects include teaching Judaism via the media, running a synagogue led by Rabbi Yaakov Belenky, and other activities in Ma'aleh Adumim. It is an important proponent of Religious Zionism among Russian-speaking Jews.

== Other uses of the name ==
Machanaim is also the name of a popular game played at Jewish summer camps and schools. It is sometimes spelled Machanayim. In Jerusalem there is a Haredi neighbourhood named Machanaim, close to Sanhedria.
