= Maisit =

The Torah distinguishes two types of enticers to idolatry: mesit (Hebrew: מסית) (Deut. 13:7) is a Jew who seduces an individual to idolatry, while a madiach (מדיח) (Deut. 13:14) is someone who publicly entices many into idolatry. An enticer to idolatry may be both. Enticement to idolatry in Judaism is a capital offence under the Law of Moses.

== Biblical Source ==
Deut. 13:7-9 states:

13:7 If thy brother, the son of thy mother, or thy son, or thy daughter, or the wife of thy bosom, or thy friend, that is as thine own soul, entice thee [yeSITikha — the root of the word meSIT] secretly, saying: 'Let us go and serve other gods,' which thou hast not known, thou, nor thy fathers;

י יסיתך אחיך בן אמך או בנך או בתך או אשת חיקך או רעך אשר כנפשך בסתר לאמר נלכה ונעבדה אלהים אחרים אשר לא ידעת אתה ואבתיך

13:8 of the gods of the peoples that are round about you, nigh unto thee, or far off from thee, from the one end of the earth even unto the other end of the earth;

מאלהי העמים אשר סביבתיכם הקרבים אליך או הרחקים ממך מקצה הארץ ועד קצה הארץ

13:9 thou shalt not consent unto him, nor hearken unto him; neither shall thine eye pity him, neither shalt thou spare, neither shalt thou conceal him;

לא תאבה לו ולא תשמע אליו ולא תחוס עינך עליו ולא תחמל ולא תכסה עליו

The Law of Moses takes a strong and non-compassionate approach to the enticer due to the offensive service of idolatry to which the enticer seeks to draw worshipers.

== Rabbinic interpretation ==
The crime of the enticer to idolatry was so serious and dangerous that in some cases some legal (halakhic) requirements of due process could be relaxed in order to entrap the enticer. The halakhot regarding a mesit and madiach may be found in Maimonides' Mishneh Torah: Sefer haMada: Avodat Kokhavim (Idolatry): Chapter Five. Five negative commandments regarding the mesit are derived from just one verse, Deut. 13:9 (quoted above); they are:

1. Not to love a mesit
2. Not to reduce one's hatred for him
3. Not to save his life
4. Not to advance any arguments on his behalf
5. Not to withhold information that will lead to his conviction

A person is a mesit if for example he tells a colleague, "I will worship a false deity. (Follow me;) I will go and worship..." or "Let us go and worship..." That is, whether he entices his fellow in singular or plural terms. When he proselytizes two individuals, they may serve as witnesses against him. They should summon him to court and testify against him, relating what he told them, and the mesit is stoned.

Considering the extreme stance Deuteronomy 13 takes regarding to enticement to idolatry, Chazal list a number of detail that project the unique methods required to deal with the enticer;

1. Even if the enticee did not worship idolatry in action the enticer is still liable to death
2. The enticer is liable to death even without the normal process of warning (Hebrew hathra'ah)
3. It is legal for the witnesses to conceal themselves when visualizing the enticer in action
4. It is legal to withhold witness material that could potentially save the enticer
5. The enticed person himself is obliged to bring the enticer to the stoning area
6. Public announcement of an impending execution of the enticer is required

Although the original context of Deuteronomy is paganism, in some later rabbinic interpretation the passage about the "enticer" was also applied to Christian proselytism.

== See also ==
- 613 Mitzvot
- Torah
