= Joseph Messas =

Moroccan-born Sephardic rabbi (1892–1974)

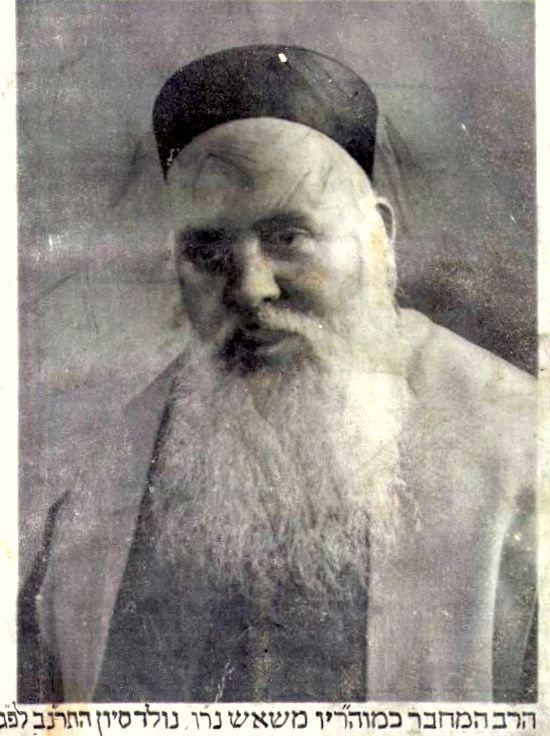
Joseph Messas

Joseph Messas (Hebrew: יוסף משאש; lived 1892-1974) was a Moroccan-Israeli rabbi, posek, poet, historian, and public figure. He served as the rabbi of Tlemcen and later as the Sephardi rabbi of Haifa.

== Biography ==
He was born in Meknes, Morocco. In his youth he studied in the yeshiva of R' Halpern in Meknes, and also in the yeshiva headed by the brothers R' Yosef and R' Refael Alkobi. At age 31 he was chosen as chief rabbi of Tlemcen, a role he filled for 17 years. Later, after the death of R' Yaakov Toledano, he returned to Meknes to serve as a judge. He was well known among government figures, and honored by the king of Morocco.

In 5724 (1963-4) he moved to Israel and settled in Haifa. At first he refused to serve as chief rabbi of Haifa, despite his reputation in Morocco. However, after encouragement from Haifa's mayor Abba Hushi, he took the position of Sephardi chief rabbi in 5728 (1967-8), a position which he held until his death.

His first cousin was the father of Rabbi Chalom Messas.

== Works ==
He wrote 48 works, among them:

- Shut Mayim Chayim, halachic responsa (two volumes published in 1934 and 1967)
- Otzar Michtavim (three volumes, published 1968-1975)
- Ner Mitzvah (8 volumes, published 1939, republished in 1969 with additions, and again in 2000)

Messas' halachic opinions were often original and surprisingly lenient, leading some to nickname him "Joseph the lenient" (יוסף המתיר), and for figures such as R' Ovadiah Yosef to say Messas' rulings could not be relied upon. Yet he commanded respect among his Orthodox rabbinic peers, as shown by their correspondence with him, and by his appointment as chief rabbi of Haifa late in life when his views were well known.

In the preface of his sefer he hints to the fact that he had giluy Eliyahu on a number of occasions.
