= Even Ha'ezer =

Jewish religious text

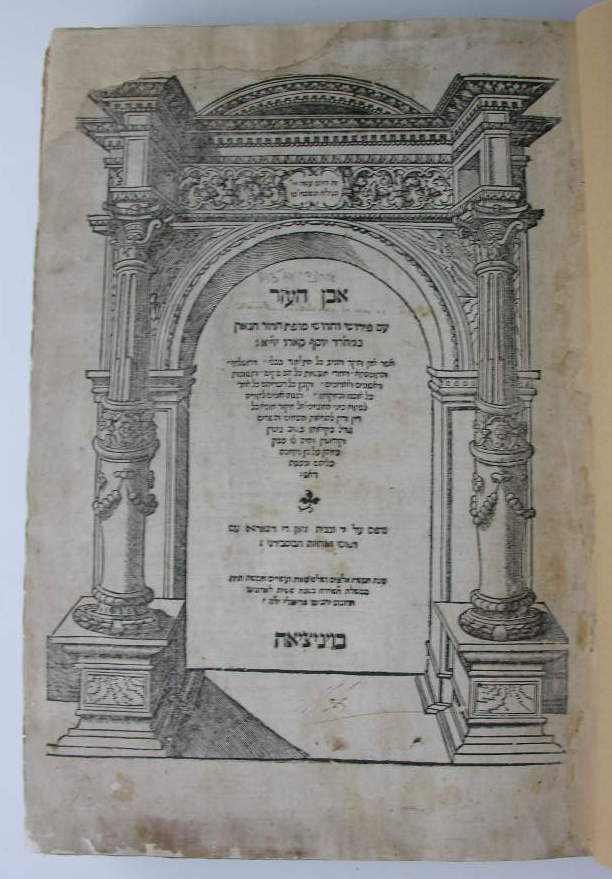
Title page of an edition of Even Ha'ezer from 1565.

Even Ha'ezer (lit. "The Stone of Help" or "The Rock of the Helpmate") is a section of Rabbi Jacob ben Asher's compilation of halakha (Jewish law), Arba'ah Turim. This section treats aspects of Jewish law related to marriage, divorce, and sexual conduct. Later, Rabbi Yosef Karo modeled the framework of his own compilation of practical Jewish law, the Shulchan Aruch, after the Arba'ah Turim. Many later commentators used this framework as well. Thus, "Even Ha'ezer" in common usage may refer to an area of halakha non-specific to Rabbi Jacob ben Asher's compilation.

== Other Sections ==
The other three sections of Arba'ah Turim and other works borrowing its organizational scheme are:

- Orach Chayim
- Yoreh De'ah
- Choshen Mishpat
