= Jacob ben Asher =

German rabbinic authority (c. 1269 - c. 1343)

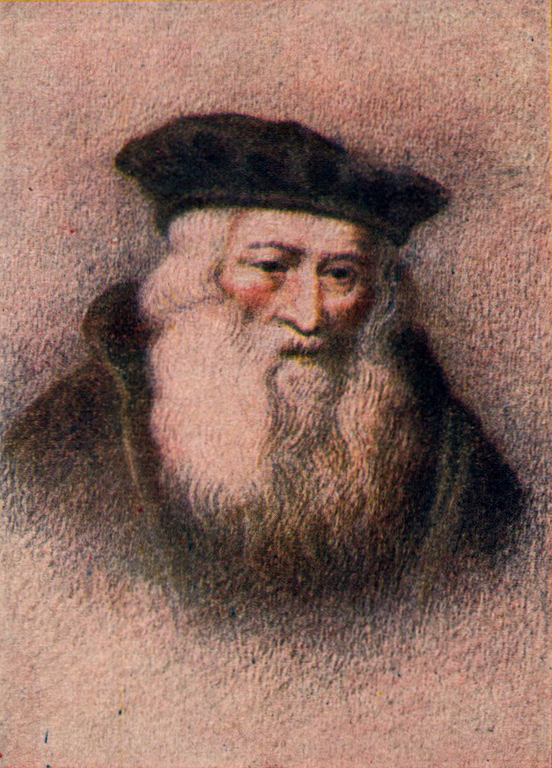
- Modern artistic depiction

Personal life
- Born: c. 1269 Cologne, Holy Roman Empire
- Died: c. 1343 Toledo, Castile
- Parent: Asher ben Jehiel (father)

Religious life
- Religion: Judaism

Jacob ben Asher (c. 1270–1340), also known as Ba'al ha-Turim as well as Yaakov ben haRosh, was an influential Medieval rabbinic authority. He is often referred to as the Ba'al ha-Turim ("Author of the Turim") or simply HaTur, after his main work, the Arba'ah Turim ("Four Columns").

== Biography ==
He was probably born in the Holy Roman Empire at Cologne about 1270 and probably died at Toledo, then in the Kingdom of Castile, in 1340.

He was the third son of the Asher ben Jehiel (known as the "Rosh"), a rabbi of the Holy Roman Empire who, in 1303, moved to Toledo in Castile, due to increasing persecution of Jews in his native Germany. Besides his father, who was his principal teacher, Jacob quotes very often in the Turim his elder brother Jehiel; once his brother Judah and once his uncle Chaim.

Some say Jacob succeeded his father as the rabbi of the Jewish community of Toledo (Zacuto), while others say his brother Judah ben Asher did. His brothers were also rabbis of different communities in Iberia. He lived in abject poverty most of his life, and according to the Sephardic Community of Chios, is said to have fallen ill and died with his ten companions on the island of Chios, in Greece, whilst travelling.

== Works ==
- Arba'ah Turim, one of the most important halachic books of all time. The work was divided into four sections, each called a "tur," alluding to the columns of jewels on the High Priest's breastplate.
- Sefer ha-Remazim, or "Kitzur Piske ha-Rosh" (Constantinople, 1575), an abridgment of his father's compendium of the Talmud, in which he condensed his father's decisions, omitting the casuistry.
- Rimzei Ba'al ha-Turim or Perush ha-Torah le-R. Ya'akov Ba'al ha-Turim (Constantinople, 1500 and 1514), a short commentary on the Pentateuch, (actually short appetizers that start each section of his actual Torah commentary) which is printed in virtually all Jewish editions of the Pentateuch. These appetizers consist of mystical and symbolical references in the Torah text (see Masoretic Text), often using gematria and acronyms as well as other occurrences of particular words elsewhere in the Torah.
- Perush Al ha-Torah, the full commentary on the Pentateuch (Zolkiev, 1806). Its content is taken mainly from Nachmanides (often copied word-for-word), but without his cabalistic and philosophical interpretations. Jacob quotes many other commentators, among them Saadia Gaon, Rashi, Joseph Kara and Abraham ibn Ezra.
- Works of Jacob ben Ascher in the Gesamtkatalog der Wiegendrucke. Retrieved 2010-04-20

== See also ==
- Mezuzah: see his contribution to the way it is affixed
