= Damages (Jewish law) =

Concept in Jewish law

In Jewish law, damages (Hebrew: נזיקין, nezikin) covers a range of jurisprudential topics that roughly correspond in secular law to torts. Jewish law on damages is grounded partly on the Written Torah, the Hebrew Bible, and partly on the Oral Torah, centered primarily in the Mishnaic Order of Nezikin. Since at least of the time of the Mishnah, Rabbinic culture developed and interpreted the laws of damages through communal courts, judges, and enforcement. While Jewish communities exercised relatively little authority over criminal law in the diaspora, quasi-autonomous communal oversight of damages (tort law) continued to be extensive until the modern era. Jews continue to this day to voluntarily submit themselves to adjudication of damages disputes by rabbinic judges and courts (beit din). This practice is more prevalent today in communities that profess Orthodox Judaism. In addition, aspects of rabbinic law have been absorbed into tort law in Israel.

Damages include any wrongful act, neglect, or default whereby legal harm is caused to the person, property, or reputation of another. They usually give rise to some form of compensatory liability, though some exceptional damages may be prohibited (or merely deprecated) without accompanying liability. Under rabbinic law, there are important distinctions between damages caused by persons or by property, and between direct and indirect action. When people cause damage directly, they are covered by the rabbinic equivalent of either assault and battery, against another person, or trespass against another's property. When one's property causes damage, Jewish law may distinguish torts due to such factors as accidents, negligence, fault or willful fraud.

As a religious law, Jewish law or halakhah characterize a variety of actions as damages, though these may not correspond to secular legal conceptions. Notably, Jewish law tends to go beyond secular law in prohibiting or regulating acts of hurtful speech, humiliation, betrayal, and self-injury.

== History and literature ==
In rabbinic literature, damages law is articulated primarily in tractate Bava Kamma of the aptly named Order Nezikin. In Bava Kamma, the Mishnah and Talmud set forth the framework for damages law and formulate numerous rules and key principles. In addition, law pertaining to damages appears in Bava Metzia, Sanhedrin and other Talmudic tractates. After undergoing further expression during the Geonic period, damages law was incorporated in the Jewish law codes of the medieval and early modern periods. In the Shulchan Aruch (16th century), the topic is codified primarily within Hoshen Mishpat, the section (Tur) most similar to modern civil law. The law of damages remained a popular and important topic throughout the history of rabbinic responsa literature, tapering off dramatically in the 19th century as European Jewish communities come under the jurisdiction of national legal systems.

== Accidents ==
In daily life, an accident is an unforeseen harm that befalls a person or property, usually through lack of care. The person injured or the owner of the things destroyed or depreciated is entitled to compensation and if necessary to seek redress in a civil court through litigation, which, in every system of jurisprudence, is governed by special laws.

=== The four "father categories" of damage ===
The Torah deals with the law of negligence in Ex 21:28–36 and Ex 22:4–5, the leading cases being those of an ox goring a man or beast; an open, unprotected pit; fire spreading to a neighbor's property; also, to a certain extent, trespassing cattle. For the rules of Ex 22:6–14, concerning the liability of a person lawfully possessed of another's goods for loss or destruction, see Bailments. In the language of the Mishnah the chief instances given in the Torah for a more broadly applicable law, such as those relating to the goring ox or those relating to any animal that inflicts unusual harm, or to the open pit or any similar inanimate thing, are called "fathers"; other instances derived from these are known as "descendants" or "derivatives".

The Mishnah and the Tosefta treat the law of compensation for results of negligence in Bava Kamma, 1-6, commented on in the Babylonian Talmud, 2-62b, and in the Jerusalem Talmud, 2-5c. Maimonides discusses the subject under the heading Damage to Property ("Nizkei Mamon") in his Mishneh Torah.

The "goring ox" with its derivatives is put aside, because full compensation for its acts can be demanded only when the master has been forewarned, and the treatise opens with the following four "fathers" for full compensation, under the technical names of "ox", "pit", "chewer", and "kindling". Here the "ox" means an animal allowed to trespass on a stranger's land and do injury with its foot; the "chewer", a like animal that does harm with its teeth. Both examples are derived from Ex 22:4. The damage done may far surpass the gain to the owner of the animal. The "pit" refers to Ex 21:33, the "kindling" to Ex 22:5. Rav, a leading Babylonian authority, understood the "ox" among the "fathers" to embrace both the foot and tooth, and regards the word here rendered "chewer" as standing for man; for when a man himself commits an injury he is always mulcted in full damages.

=== Derivative categories ===
Any tame animal permitted willfully or carelessly to go on a neighbor's land, and which does mischief by knocking things over with its body, or by dragging them along by means of its hair, tail, harness, bridle, or yoke, or by the burden which it carries, or by rubbing against a post or wall, is a derivative of the "ox", while an animal breaking down a post or wall by rubbing against it, or defiling grain or grass with its excrements, is a derivative of the "chewer". But striking with the body, or malignantly biting, or crouching on something, or kicking, is treated on the same principle as "goring". Chickens, dogs, cats, and even hogs are named among the animals for which the owner is made liable. Derivatives of the "pit" are a stone, knife, burden, or a mound; in short, anything over which one can stumble or from which one can receive injury if left in the open, that is, on the highway or on common lands. Derivatives of the "kindling" are articles which the owner has left on his roof, whence the wind carries them off to the injury of person or property. For whatever damage arises indirectly, the ultimate author is liable to the extent of only half compensation. Thus, when the foot, in striking the ground, kicks up pebbles, and these cause an injury, or when the animal upsets any implements, which in turn fall upon other implements and break them, the damage is considered remote, and only half compensation is given. These remote damages, when caused by animals, are known generally as the "case of pebbles" (tzrorot).

== Assault and battery ==
"Assault and battery" is the English law term for injury to the person (Hebrew: khovel be-khavero). In ancient law, redress for injuries to the body takes the form of compensation to the person wronged, not of punishment in the name of the state; and this principle is found throughout the Talmudic jurisprudence. Many nations of antiquity and the Germanic tribes as late as the earlier Middle Ages allowed even the guilt of the murderer to be atoned by the payment of wergild (literally "man-payment") to the heirs of the murdered. Jewish law holds a different stance, "You shall take no ransom for the life of a manslayer" (Numbers 35:31).

=== The law of retaliation ===
The passages of Scripture from which the law of assault and battery is derived are Exodus 21:18,19,22–25; Leviticus 24:19,20; Deuteronomy 19:21 (indirectly), and 25:11,12. According to the literal interpretation, these passages teach the law of retaliation: eye for eye, tooth for tooth, as the redress for mutilation or, technically speaking, mayhem; bruise for bruise, lash for lash, etc., as the redress for the infliction of pain and cutting off the offender's hand as the punishment for disgracing another by violent means. The Sadducees, when in power, following from their interpretations focused on the letter of the law, followed these passages literally. The Megillat Ta'anit (ch. 4) ascribes this practice to the "Boethus men", with whom the Sadducees are often identified; and the varied efforts of many rabbis to give good scriptural grounds for their own theory indicate that there were some who dissented from the Pharisaic interpretation.

=== Five grounds of liability ===
In cases of injury to a person, Talmudic law identifies five categories of damages:

1. damage proper (נזק, nézek, 'damage, tort')
2. pain (צער, tsa'ár, 'suffering, sadness')
3. stoppage of work (שָׁבַת, shavát, 'to stop working, to rest')
4. cost of cure (ריפוי, ripui, 'healing')
5. shame (בֹּשֶׁת, bṓšeṯ, 'shame, disgrace')

In dealing with these categories, the Gemara first discusses why the literal rule of eye for eye must yield to the law of compensatory damages in money. Referring to the passage in Leviticus 24:17-22, where the killing of a man is discussed along with the killing of an animal, it is argued that, as payment is made for the latter, so payment should be made for the former, except in the special case in which the man is killed, inasmuch as the Lawgiver says (Numbers 35:31), "Ye shall take no ransom for the life of a manslayer"; which shows that for the murderer there is no ransom or satisfaction, but that there is a ransom for him that takes anything less than life, as, for instance, the principal limbs, which, when removed, never grow again. Again, if a blind man put out the eyes of a man possessing sight, what can be done to the offender in the way of retaliation? Nevertheless, the Law says, "Ye shall have one manner of law" (Leviticus 24:22); hence redress must be adjudged in money against all alike. Further, stress is laid on the term "takhat" (for, in place of) which is applied to animals, as, "he shall surely pay ox for ox" (Exodus 21:36), and again in the phrase "eye for [in place of] eye" (Exodus 21:24); still greater stress is laid on the verb נָתַן, natán, 'to give', which is used in Exodus 21:22, where nothing but a money reward can be meant, and is again used in the rule in Leviticus 24:20, which literally translated reads, "as he makes a blemish upon man, so shall it be made upon him".

Since the interpretation of "eye for eye" is established as monetary compensation, there is no reason for them to doubt that "bruise for bruise" means money for the pain suffered, and does not mean the infliction of like pain. However, the position is strengthened by the passage in Deuteronomy 22:28, 29, where he who forcibly seizes a damsel not betrothed and lies with her, is fined in the sum of fifty shekels, because (takhat asher) "he hath humbled her".

==== Damage proper and its appraisal ====
How much should a person be compensated for injuries? The Mishnah says the damage is appraised by calculating the different of two values: how much the person injured would have been worth as a slave in the market before the infliction of the injury and how much the injured party is worth after it. This difference represents the liability for damage proper. But if the result of the injury has been to render its victim deaf, he is considered worth nothing whatsoever, and the damage is accordingly equal to the whole of his former value.

==== Pain ====
Pain, "as when he has singed him with a spit or spike, even on his finger-nail, where no mark is left." Here the question arises, should the judges ask themselves (a) how much money would "such a man" (that is, one as strong or as delicate as the injured man) be willing to take to submit to the pain, or rather (b) how much would he be willing to pay to forego the pain? The former measure, though named in the Mishnah, is in the Gemara deemed inadmissible; for many people would not take all the money in the world and willingly submit to the pain: the latter measure is held to be more reasonable. Where the pain is incident to a mutilation, the judges should say: "Suppose the wounded man to have been sentenced to have his hand cut off, how much would he be willing to pay to have it taken off under the influence of an anesthetic, rather than have it crudely hacked off; and this amount would serve to represent the damage".

==== Stoppage of work ====
The Mishnah allows to the injured man his wages only as a "watcher of cucumbers"—that is, such wages as he can earn in his disabled condition—"because he has already been paid the value of his eye or the value of his hand"; for the action might be brought at once when the injury was done, and the judges would estimate the loss of time beforehand. This estimate should be paid in full, even if the injured man should recover sooner than was expected.

An example is put, where violence may bring about stoppage of work alone, without mutilation or pain or need for cure: it is in the case of unlawful imprisonment.

The Gemara specifies that where the injury is temporary and expected to heal completely, the injured man is paid the wages he earned at his profession. These are not included in the payment for "damage" as they are when the injury is permanent.

==== Cost of cure ====
Talmudic law provided for a kind of health cost coverage, a liability imposed on whoever causes injury.

A verse in the Book of Exodus states, "he ... shall cause him to be thoroughly healed": the inference is that the guilty party shall pay for the services of a doctor. He may not offer his own services, no matter what his skill may be; nor can he avoid the outlay of money by finding a physician that will do the healing work free of charge. Should ulcers arise in consequence of a wound, the cost of healing such ulcers also falls on the assailant; but if ulcers arise from other causes, for instance, because the wounded man disregards the orders of his physician, the cost of healing these is not to be assessed. The wound may disappear and break out again and again: the cost of cure will still rest on the assailant; but if it be once fully healed (literally, "to its full need"), the liability comes to an end. The occasion for cost of cure may exist without any of the other elements of damage; for instance, where one has forcibly thrown chemicals upon another, giving to his skin the whiteness of leprosy, it is his duty to pay the cost of having the skin restored to a healthy color.

==== Shame or humiliation ====
For the sages, it was deemed of utmost importance to avoid shaming another person. Hence, they sought to impose liability for humiliating personal injury, regardless of the physical effects of the injury.

Here it is impossible to lay down hard and fast rules; for, as the Mishnah says, "it all depends on who is put to shame and who it is that puts him to shame." But for certain acts of violence that involve very little pain and no permanent disablement, but mainly disgrace, the sages fixed a scale of compensation, namely: for a stroke with the fist, one sela or shekel, for a slap with the open hand, two hundred zuzin, for a back-handed slap, or for pulling a man's ear or hair, or tearing off his cloak or a woman's headgear, or spitting at a person if the spittle reaches his flesh, four hundred zuzin. A kick with the knee costs three selas; with the foot five selas; a stroke with an ass' saddle thirteen. According to Maimonides, each slap, kick, or stroke counts separately. But he also says (following Bava Kamma 36b) that these sums are not meant for the full-weight or Tyrian coins, but for the "country currency", worth only one-eighth of the Tyrian.

These liquidated damages cover only pain and shame: if sickness ensue, stoppage and cure have to be paid for separately.

=== Israelites to be treated as free persons ===
Although Rabbi Meir's opinion, that all Israelites are to be treated as freemen and as freewomen, as "the descendants of Abraham, Isaac, and Jacob", and are therefore entitled to the same compensation for disgrace, has not been accepted generally, yet where the sum has been fixed by the sages, as shown above, no reduction is made on account of the poverty or low degree or even of the lack of self-respect of the party insulted.

There is a sixth element (which arises, however, but rarely); namely, the "price of children" (Exodus 21:22): "If men strive together and hurt a woman with child, so that her fruit depart, and yet no mischief follow, ... he shall pay as the judges determine." Something is to be paid over and above damage, pain, etc., which is hard to determine; for a woman delivered of her child is, generally speaking, not made the worse thereby; though in the special case she may be much debilitated. Her loss of health and strength would fall under the head of damage proper.

Another view is, however, expressed in the Mishnah to the effect that the "demei veladot" (the price of the child or children that were destroyed by the miscarriage) should be paid to the husband of the woman by the man causing the damage. The standard authorities are almost silent on the subject.

=== Human beings are "forewarned" ===
A human being is always "forewarned"; that is, he is, like a "forewarned ox", liable for full damage, whether awake or asleep, whether willing or unwilling. But if a man in his sleep or unwillingly (as by falling from a roof) hurt another person, he is not liable for the harm that might result, say, if such person's clothes should be torn from him; and if A hurt B by pure accident—for instance, if he be thrown upon him from a roof by a sudden gust of wind—he is liable only for damage, but not for pain, healing, or stoppage.

=== Persons "bad to meet" ===
Deaf-mutes, insane persons, and children are "pegi'atan ra'ah " (bad to meet); he who hurts them is liable for full compensation; but if they commit an assault, they are not liable at all. However, no compensation for shame is made to the insane. When an injury is done to a female child, the compensation for "damage" and loss of time is payable to her father.

A married woman or a slave is also "bad to meet", as full compensation must be paid for any injury done to either of them. According to the better opinion, the assailant of a slave must pay even for the disgrace put upon him. The compensation for injury to a married woman, for pain and shame, is paid to her; for loss of work and healing, to her husband; for damage proper, according to one opinion, to her, according to another, to her husband. For an injury to a slave the whole compensation goes to the master. When an injury is done to a male still at the father's board, the compensation should be invested in land, of which the father will receive the rents and profits until the boy turns 13. When a father injures his female child, he pays pain, cure, and shame to her at once, but neither damage nor loss of time. A married woman is excused from payment only because she has no property under her own control; a slave, because he cannot own property: hence, when the woman become single (by divorce or the death of her husband), or when the slave is emancipated, she or he may be sued for the injury done while under disability.

When a man does an injury to his own wife, he is bound to pay her for her damage, pain, and shame at once, in such a manner as to give her the free disposition of the money. He needs not pay for loss of work; and for her healing he is bound as her husband. The wife, if she injure her husband, is liable for full compensation. The way it should be collected is described in the ketubah.

A master is not responsible for assaults committed by his male or female slave, nor for injuries done by them to the property of another. A master injuring a Hebrew servant is liable for all the elements of damage except that of stoppage of work, that being a loss to him only.

=== Self-defense as justification ===
Self-defense is a full justification for an assault that is not continued after the necessity has ceased. But if two men strike each other at the same time, each is liable to the other, and the excess in damages must be paid.

Where one enters upon the grounds of another without his permission, the owner of the ground may order him off, and may even remove him by force, but if he strike him or harm him otherwise than in forcing him away, he is liable like any other assailant.

Should the injured party die before he recovers judgment for the assault, the right of action is cast upon his heirs, and in like manner if the assailant die before satisfaction is made or before it is adjudged, the action for the wrong done may be brought against the heirs, and it may be satisfied out of the estate descended to such heirs.

To this rule there is one very rare exception, namely, where one disgraces a sleeping person (say, by exposing their nude body), and the sleeper dies without finding it out, the action for the disgrace does not pass to his heirs.

The maxim of the common law, that a felony merges the civil remedy, was also known to the Rabbis. When a man strikes his father or mother so as to leave a mark ("ḥabburah"), or when he wounds any one on sabbath, he can not be sued for compensation; for he is deserving of death (קים ליה בדרבה מיניה). While it was very unlikely that the offender would be put to death—for long before the days of the Mishnah capital punishment under the Mosaic law had ceased —still this excuse of the lesser offense by the greater was held good. But where the act is punishable by lashes only, such as wounding a person on Yom Kippur, the civil remedy is available.

The payments for damage and for pain are in the nature of penalties, and can be adjudged only upon proof by witnesses. But in the absence of witnesses the assailant can, upon his own confession, be ordered to pay for loss of work and cost of cure—which elements are in the nature of a debt—and for the disgrace suffered, on the ground that by his own confession he publishes the humiliation of his victim.

=== Procedure in assault cases ===
Only a court of ordained judges could try an action for injury to the person, according to the rules mentioned down above, and give judgment for a definite sum. As judges could only be lawfully ordained in the Land of Israel, judgments for damage and pain could not be collected, even in Babylonia. But, as a matter of necessity, a system was worked out which soon spread over all countries in which the Jews enjoyed any sort of autonomy. When parties complained of injuries, the judges, after hearing their allegations and the testimony of witnesses, indicated the sum that in their opinion the assailant should pay, and, upon his refusal, would threaten him with excommunication (Hebrew: נִדּוּי, romanized: nidúy) and this course would generally have the desired effect. But loss of time and cost of cure, being elements sounding in money, and not in the nature of penalties, can only be determined by judges having ordination.

Although the remedy for assaults was altogether financial, to strike a fellow Israelite was always deemed a sinful and forbidden action. The law strictly forbids the giving to a convicted criminal a single blow beyond the lawful number. The sages concluded that a blow given to any one, except by authority of law, was forbidden by Scripture; and they held that, though the assailant had paid all damages, he should ask forgiveness from the injured party, and that it was the duty of the injured, when earnestly entreated, not vindictively to withhold his forgiveness.

When damages which usually follow a striking arise without actual contact with the body of the injured person—for instance, if one frighten his neighbor, or yell into his ears in such a way as to deafen him or otherwise make him ill—the wrong-doer is "free from human judgment", but liable to the punishment of heaven.

=== Gentiles and women ===
Due to the midrashic interpretation of biblical law, laws of assault and battery were not applied to affairs in which either party was a gentile. Specifically, the Torah regulates interactions between persons and their fellow, the latter understood as a fellow Jew. Whatever redress was given in cases with gentiles by Jewish courts was only a matter of equity, or, as the Rabbis say, by reference to Proverbs 3:17, "for the sake of the ways of peace" (Hebrew: דרכי שלום, romanized: darchei shalóm, lit. 'peace-way').

The law of damages does cover women, both as plaintiff and defendant.

=== Sources ===
Nearly all of the Talmudic law collected here on assault and battery is to be found in the eighth chapter of Baba Kamma (83b to 93a). The subject is discussed by Maimonides in Mishneh Torah, Hovel u-Mazzik; in the Tur; and in the Shulchan Aruch, Choshen Mishpat, under the title Chovel ba-chavero (ch. 420-424).

== Self-Injury and Self-Endangerment ==
Owing largely to Jewish religious principles, halakhah forbids both injury to others as well as injury to one's self.

Why is self-injury prohibited? In rabbinic Judaism, human beings are not given unfettered autonomy over their bodies and actions; instead, God is considered the creator and owner, while each human serves as a steward for their life. In addition, rabbinic Judaism places the utmost value on human life, including preservation of the living human body, and this value is applied to responsibility to one's self. By the same token, Jewish law forbids suicide and, generally speaking, self-mutilation. Furthermore, just as halakhah sets limits on how much one may place another person, or their property, in danger, so does the law restrict self-endangerment.

Principles of self-injury are applied to more than just one's self. It is noteworthy that a person may not request or hire an agent to injure themselves: it is forbidden to waive the rule against self-injury or to abet self-injury to one's own body. The Mishnah states: "If a person asks, 'Blind my eye', or 'cut off my hand' or 'break my leg,' anyone who does so is liable (for violating injury law) — even if a person asking to be injured stipulates that anyone who does so would be exempt, the one who causes injury would still be liable. Likewise, if a person asks, 'Tear my clothes' or break my pitcher' then anyone who does so is liable; however, if a person asking for their property to be damages stipulates that anyone who does so would be exempt, then the exemption is valid." (Bava Kamma 8:7)

Given the Jewish disregard for self-injury, rabbinic law also seeks to reduce the extent to which people put themselves into situations of potential danger. However, self-endangerment is difficult to regulate when the chances of harm are either very low, hard to assess, or commonly accepted. In the medieval period, rabbinic authorities differed on whether to restrict activities, such as bloodletting or circumcision, at inauspicious (or superstitious) times. Rabbis eventually overturned such questionable self-endangerment precedents, as when they allowed marriage to a woman who had more than one previous husband die (isha katlanit). In the 20th century, Rabbi Moshe Feinstein and other poskim examined whether Jewish law forbids cigarette smoking or whether smoking risks are so commonplace as to be permitted under the principle that "The Lord protects the simple".

Nonetheless, the laws of self-injury are complex because halakhah allows people to harm or endanger themselves in certain circumstances. In Jewish law, several quite different values may be called upon to justify self-injury. Notably, in some cases, people are allowed or even required to endanger themselves in order to save life. As stated in Leviticus 19:16, "Do not stand idly by" when one's fellow is in harm's way. Similarly, Jewish medical ethics expects patients to make an effort to receive adequate medical care, albeit with pain and risk. Furthermore, halakhah recognizes that there is no free lunch — people must expose themselves to occupational hazards in order to make a livelihood (Hebrew: פַּרְנָסָה, romanized: parnasá, lit. 'need, subsistence, occupation'). For example, the Bible mentions hazardous work and Talmudic literature sanctions jobs that require perilous sea crossings or caravan journeys. In the modern era, Rabbi Ezekiel Landau is cited for his limited approval of wild animal hunting for livelihood. Finally, as in Christianity and Islam, Judaism makes exceptions for self-injury in cases of theological or communal crisis, even to the point of martyrdom.

== Miscellaneous Torts and Damages ==
=== Mesne profits: in the Mishnah and Talmud ===
The income derived from land unlawfully held by the possessor, for which he is answerable to the true owner when the latter recovers the land from him by the judgment of a court. The Talmud speaks of the possessor of land without right as the "robber of the land" (in English law, "disseizor"); and he, or even a third person who takes fruits or branches from land thus withheld from the true owner, is considered as morally guilty of robbery (see the prohibition of an Israelite using, in the Four species for Sukkot, a lulav or etrog taken from land held by a disseizor). The liability to pay mesne profits is implied and rather distantly indicated in the Mishnah. Assuming that he who sells land with warranty is liable not only for the price of the land which he receives, but also for the mesne profits which the purchaser will have to pay after eviction to the true owner, it is here taught that from motives of public policy the warranty inserted in the deed of sale, though in the nature of a bond, is to be levied, as far as it secures the purchaser against this liability, only upon "free property", not on "subjected property", i.e., on lands which in the meanwhile have been given away, sold, or encumbered. The Gemara discusses this matter fully in the light of the warranty, the liability of the unlawful possessor being taken for granted.

=== Depasturing ===
A liability for full damages is imposed by Exodus 22:4: "If a man pastures on field or vineyard and sends his cattle to pasture in the field of another, he shall make it good with the best of his field and the best of his vineyard." When he pastures thus purposely, it is really a trespass, but the liability for "foot or tooth" is often as full when beasts go of themselves into the domain of another. Accidental injuries of this kind have been referred to under accident. But when an animal eats the neighbor's produce, is the owner liable for the harm done, or only for his profit by its eating? In the case put in Scripture he is of course bound for the former. Other cases are thus put by Maimonides.

=== Willful and accidental ===
Liability for damages varies depending on whether accidental damage may be anticipated. The following examples are instructive and serve as precedents.

When, from necessity, one's animal eats an unusual food, e.g., when a donkey eats fish, the owner pays full damage. (Liability applies on the grounds of the injured party, but if on the highway, the owner pays only the amount which he has profited). Where a beast of prey enters the grounds of the injured party and tears or devours a domestic animal, the owner of the beast is liable for full damage, because it is its nature to act in the manner as it did. In contrast, if a dog should trespass and eat lambs or a cat eat grown hens, only half damage is due since this is unusual. When a donkey, finding bread in a basket, eats the bread and breaks the basket, the owner pays full damage for both. Where a beast, whether walking or standing, eats grass from the middle of a square, the owner pays what he profits, where it eats from the side he pays full damage. For what it eats out of the door of a shop, its owner is required to pay the equivalent of what he has profited thereby; from the interior of the shop, full damage. If, walking along the road, a beast eats off the back of another beast, only the saving in fodder is paid for. If it jumps out of its place, full damage is due. If one's beast glides or stumbles into another's garden and eats, etc., the owner owes only for what he profits, even if the beast goes from bed to bed, or stays in the garden all day. If instead it walks into the garden in the regular way, there is liability for full damage. So, also, if it is pushed into the garden by a companion, for the owner should lead his herd in single file.

=== Unintentional injury ===
Though "a man is always forewarned", that is, liable for his actions, asleep or awake, intentional or unintentional (see § Assault and battery), there is a broad exception to the rule, specifically, when the mischief is done on the ground of the injuring party. For what a man does within his own domain, he is liable in damages only if it was done willfully; but he is not liable if done either unconsciously or under compulsion. Where a man climbs a ladder, and a rung falls out under him and strikes another, he is liable if the rung was not strong enough or not well set; but if it was strong and well set, the harm done is regarded as providential, and he goes clear, even if it happened within the domain of the injured party; while on his own ground he would go clear in either case.

=== Betrayal: informers ===
The man of violence ("annas", generally denoting an arbitrary or cruel official of the Gentile kingdom) is often mentioned in the Talmud and the codes. The most odious among torts was that of betraying the person or property of a fellow Israelite into the hands of the annas (mesirah). In the Shulchan Aruch it is put thus: "He who [by informing] delivers up property into the hands of an annas, whether Gentile or Jew, is bound to make good, from the best part of his estate, whatever the annas has taken, though he has not handled the thing at all, but has only shown the way; and if he dies, the damage done is levied from his estate in the hands of his heirs." The informer is excused if he has given information under bodily duress; but if he has handled the property himself, he is liable even then; for a man has no right to save himself at the cost of another. Further on, a religious sanction is given to this civil liability: "He who delivers up an Israelite, either in his body or in his property, to the Gentile has no share in the world to come." On the strength of a case reported in Bava Batra 116a, it is also said that it is not only permissible but meritorious to kill an informer in order to put a stop to his villainous trade.

=== Slander and insult: elder "put to shame" ===
In ordinary assault and battery, an incidental insult or humiliation needs to be paid for separately. However, when there is only an insult and no physical assault, such as one spits at another person without reaching the body (even if it reaches the garment), there is no ground for recovery. Along these lines, a Palestinian amora recounts the tradition that "He who shames another by words is free from everything." But the Jerusalem Talmud makes an exception in favor of the "elder", meaning a rabbi. Thus: "He who puts an elder to shame pays him the price of his shame. One Meshullam affronted R. Judah ben Ḥanina: the matter came before R. Simeon ben Lakish; and he fined Meshullam a litra of gold." This precedent was carried into the Halakhah; and all the Geonim followed it. They applied it to every scholar, and thus the rule appears in the code of Maimonides. where the penalty is put at 35 denarii of gold; but he adds that in Spain many of the scholars waive their privilege. While others than scholars have no civil remedy for insult or slander, the act of "blanching a man's face in public" or that of "attaching a nickname to one's neighbor" is, as has been seen in Ona'ah, among the unpardonable sins punished in the future world. It is also found that the sin of "bringing out an evil report" (slander) is fully recognized, based on Leviticus 19:16, but there is no legal remedy for the wrong done.

== See also ==
- Halakhah
- Nezikin
- Smoking in Jewish law
- Tort
- Judaism and abortion
- Mishpat Ivri

== Sources ==
- The Jewish Encyclopedia, 1906, "Accident", "Tort", "Trespass", "Assault and Battery"
- Jlaw.com Eisenberg, Daniel. "Self-Endangerment to Save Others - (SARS) posted 2003
