= Abtolemus =

Jewish rabbi

Abtolemus (Hebrew: אבטולמוס, Avtolemus; Greek: Εὔτολμος) was a Tanna of the third Generation. Jose ben Halafta was his disciple. He is quoted several times as attesting to a halacha on the authority of "Five Elders".

Some identify him with Abtolemus b. Reuben, who is cited in the Talmud:

"Abtolmus b. Reuben however was permitted to cut his hair in the Gentile fashion as he was in close contact with the royals".

— Babylonian Talmud, Tractate Bava Kamma, 83a
