= Bava Batra =

Tractate of the Talmud and the Mishnah

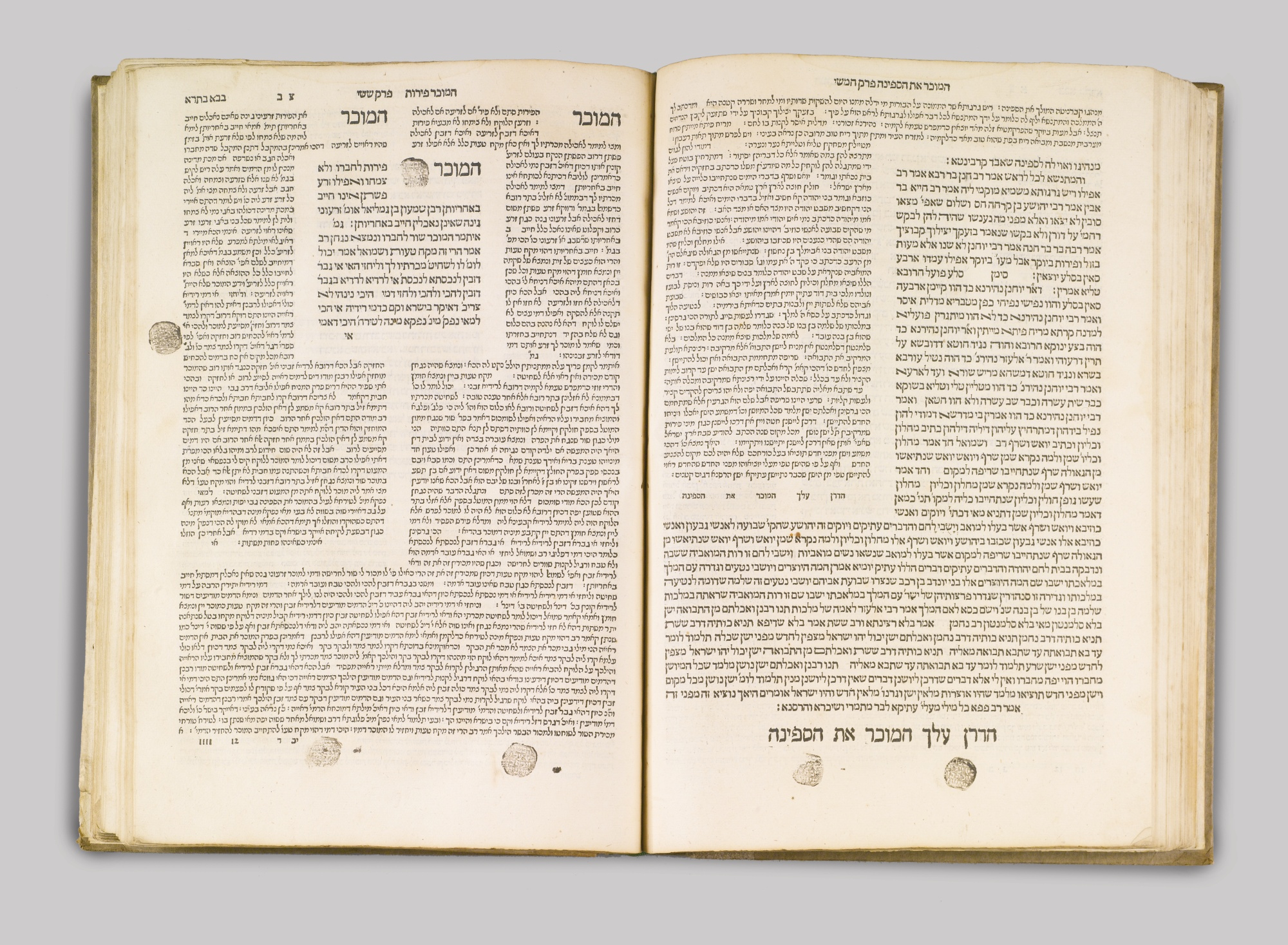

Tractate of the Talmud
- English: Last Gate
- Seder: Nezikin
- Number of mishnahs: 86
- Chapters: 10
- Babylonian Talmud pages: 176
- Jerusalem Talmud pages: 34
- Tosefta chapters: 11

Bava Batra (also Baba Batra; Jewish Babylonian Aramaic: בָּבָא בַּתְרָא, romanized: bāvā baṯrā, lit. 'The Last Gate') is the third of the three Talmudic tractates in the Talmud in the order Nezikin; it deals with a person's responsibilities and rights as the owner of property. It is part of Judaism's oral law. Originally it, together with Bava Kamma and Bava Metzia, formed a single tractate called Nezikin (torts or damages).

Unlike Bava Kamma and Bava Metzia, this tractate is not the exposition of a certain passage in the Torah.

== Mishnah ==
The Mishnah is divided into ten chapters, as follows:

- Regulations relating to jointly owned property (chapter 1)
- Responsibilities of a property owner towards his neighbor (chapter 2)
- Established rights of ownership and rights connected with property (chapter 3)
- Laws referring to the acquisition of property by purchase, as also what constitutes an unclean vessel when purchased from a Gentile (chapters 4–7)
- Laws of inheritance (chapters 8–9)
- Laws concerning documents (chapter 10)

=== Joint ownership ===
Chapter 1: Joint owners of property may dissolve a partnership and divide the property, if the parties consent, except in the case regarding a volume of the Bible, which may not be divided (literally, torn in half) under any circumstances. Things which lose their value on division can only be divided if all the owners consent. Except in these cases, either party has a right to insist on a division of the property. In the case where a courtyard (hatzer) is owned by several partners, each of them has to contribute to the usual requirements of a court; if they divide it, a partition wall or fence must be erected in accordance with certain rules. The previous partners are now neighbors; and their relations are described in chapter 2.

A courtyard less than 8 amot (approx. 18 inches × 8 = 12ft) can only be divided if both partners agree to the division. Depending on how the Mishnah is read, this division is either with a low row of wooden pegs (which shows that visual trespass is not damaging) or a four amot (approx. 72 inches) high stone wall (which shows that visual trespass is considered damaging). If both partners agree to the stone wall, it is built in the middle. The lesson taught here is that if one partner owns more property, he does not need to contribute more space for the stones of the wall.

=== Nuisance ===
Chapter 2: The fundamental rule about neighboring property is that the owner of the adjoining property must avoid everything that might prove a nuisance to the neighbor, or become a source of injury to the neighbor's property. "The noise of a smith's hammer, of a mill, or of children in school, is not to be considered a nuisance" (2:3). Disputes as regards injury or nuisance are generally settled by the fact of prior or established rights (Chazakah).

=== Chazakah ===
Chapter 3: Chazakah (presumptive right, possession de facto) is proved by the undisturbed exercise of such a right during a certain period (three years), such as the usucaption of property, in spite of the presence of the rival claimant in the same "land". In this respect Israel was divided into three "lands" or districts (3: 2): Judah, Galilee, and Perea.

=== Acquisition of property ===
In the transfer of a house, a court, a winepress, a bath, a township, or a field, much depends on the meaning of these terms, which are fully defined in chapter 4. For example: "He that sells an olive press has ipso facto sold therewith the lower millstone (Hebrew: ים) and the upper grinding-stone (Hebrew: ממל), etc." In the Mishnah similar definitions are given of a boat, a cart, a yoke of oxen, and the like (5:1–5). In selling the produce of the field care must be taken that there be no deviation from the conditions of the sale as regards quality and quantity, lest the sale be declared invalid (mekach ta'ut, 5:6–6:3). Various problems resulting from the sale of property, of a house, or of a piece of land are discussed in the Mishnah (6:4–7); among them the sale of land for a burial ground for a family, or the undertaking by a workman to prepare it (6:8). The burial-place is described as follows: "A cave hewn out in a rock 4 cubits broad and 6 cubits long (or, according to R. Simeon, 6 by 8 cubits); along the length of the cave on each side there are three graves of 4 cubits long, 1 cubit broad, and 7 handbreadths ('ṭefaḥim') high; and 2 such graves in the back of the cave. In front of the cave was the court ('hatzer') 6 by 6 cubits, so as to afford sufficient room for the bier and the persons attending the burial."

=== Laws of inheritance ===
The laws of inheritance are based on Numbers 27:8–11, as interpreted by tradition. Among these is the rule that the husband inherits the property of his deceased wife, her claim in case of the husband's death being settled in the ketubah. Another rule gives to the first-born son a double share of his deceased father's property. Thus the daughters of Zelophehad are said to have claimed, as their father's property, three shares of the Holy Land (which is assumed to have been divided among the 600,000 men brought out of Egypt); namely, the share of Zelophehad and, as a first-born son of Hefer, a double share of the property of his deceased father (8:3). These laws do not interfere with the right of a man to donate his property according to his pleasure (8:5).

Complicated cases are dealt with in chapter 9; such as the simultaneous claims of the heirs, the wife, and the creditors of the deceased; or the conflicting claims of the heirs of the husband and of those of the wife, where the husband and wife are found dead at the same time; the heirs of the former contending that she died first, and that by her death her property became the property of the husband; while the other party contends that he died first, and that the wife's heirs inherit her property.

=== Regulations about documents ===
As legal documents are of great importance in the problems dealt with in the three Babas, chapter 10 contains regulations concerning the writing of such documents. Of these one peculiarity may be mentioned; namely, the difference between get pashut, a simple, unfolded document, and get mekushar, a folded document. The latter was prepared in the following way: When a line or two had been written the parchment was folded and one witness signed on the back of the document; this operation was repeated as many times as the parties concerned liked. This method, requiring a longer time for the execution of the document, is said to have been originally introduced for the writing of a letter of divorce in the case of hasty and passionate husbands (especially priests who were prevented by law from remarrying their divorced wives), to give them time to calm down. The massekta of the three Babas closes with a general remark on the educational value of the study of civil law.

== Gemara ==
The Babylonian Talmud on Bava Batra consists of 176 folios (double-sided pages), making it the longest tractate of the Talmud.

The two Gemaras discuss and explain the laws of the Mishnah and add many fresh problems, especially the Babylonian Gemara. The Jerusalem Gemara is very short, and contains little new matter. The Babylonian gemara includes the following topics and passages:

- Page 3b: One synagogue must not be pulled down before another is built. Herod, by virtue of his authority as king, ignored the rule, and pulled down the Temple before the new one was built. The story of Herod and Mariamne and a narrative of other incidents of Herod's reign are attached.
- 7b: Every member of the community is compelled to contribute his share toward the building of gates, walls, etc., of his place.
- 10a: Turnus Rufus asked Rabbi Akiva, "If your God is a friend of the poor, why does He not give them sufficient to live upon comfortably?" To which Akiva responded, "That we may have opportunity for good actions." There are ten powerful things; and these are overcome by stronger things: a mountain by iron; iron by fire; fire by water; water is borne by the clouds; these are dispersed by the wind; the wind is borne by the human body; the latter is broken down by fear; fear is expelled by wine; wine is overcome by sleep; death is harder than all these, and yet "charity" (tzedakah) saves from death.
- 14b: The order of the Nevi'im is: Joshua, Judges, Samuel, Kings, Jeremiah, Ezekiel, Isaiah, and the twelve minor Prophets. Kings is followed by Jeremiah because Kings ends with the Exile, and Jeremiah deals with the same subject; Ezekiel precedes Isaiah, because the former ends with the rebuilding of the Temple, and Isaiah's prophecies throughout contain comforting hopes and promises. The order of the Ketuvim is Ruth, Psalms, Job, Proverbs, Ecclesiastes, Song of Songs, Lamentations, Daniel, Esther, Ezra (including Nehemiah), and Chronicles. Moses wrote his book, including the section about Balaam, and Job. Joshua wrote his book and the last eight verses of the Pentateuch.
- 21a: At first every father had to teach his children. A large school was then opened in Jerusalem; and after that schools were established in every community. At first they were attended only by youths of sixteen or seventeen years; but Joshua b. Gamla introduced the custom that children of six or seven years should attend the schools: interesting regulations are added concerning the location of public schools, the number of pupils for each class, and the like.
- 58b: The elders of the Jews say, "A judge who has to be summoned to the court, and ordered by the court to pay his debt, is unfit to act as judge."
- 73b et seq.: The wondrous tales of Rabbah bar bar Hana.
- 74b: Legends about Leviathan, and about the wonderful changes in the days of Messiah.
- 121a: Connection of the celebration of Tu B'Av with the reconciliation between the Benjamites and the rest of the Israelites.
- 144b-146b: Marital issues, including reciprocal wedding gifts by a groomsman; disposition of ketubah money in cases of adultery, rape, or the divorce or death of the betrothed man; bridal gifts by the groom; and the groom's feast.
- 145b: Three types of rabbinic scholars: experts in homiletical aggadah, in analysis (pilpul), and in Talmudic reasoning.
- 146a: Anosmia, a disabiility with the sense of smell, of a betrothed woman.

The Gemaras also contain the following interesting homiletic interpretation of Biblical passages:

- Zephaniah 2:1: "Hitkosheshu vakoshu" ("Gather yourselves together, yea, gather together"). "Kashet atzmecha, ve-achar kach kashet acherim" ("Improve thyself first, and then improve others") (60b).
- Numbers 21:27 ("Wherefore they that speak in proverbs say, 'Come ye to Heshbon'") - "Thus shall they that control themselves say, 'Come, let us reckon and compare the material loss caused by a good act with the reward, and the gain obtained through sinning, with the punishment; then thou wilt be built up and firmly established'" (78b, a play on "mashal", which also means "to rule", and on "Heshbon" = "reckoning").
- Proverbs 15:15: "All the days of the poor are troublesome"—this applies to the students of Gemara, "but he who is of a cheerful heart hath a continual feast"—this applies to the students of the Mishnah (145b).

== Commentaries ==
The commentary of Rashi on the Babylonian Talmud Baba Batra ends at the beginning of chapter 3; its place is taken by that of his grandson, Rashbam, from chapter 3 to the end of the tractate.
