= Bava Metzia =

Tractate of the Talmud

Tractate of the Talmud
- English: Middle Gate
- Seder: Nezikin
- Number of mishnahs: 101
- Chapters: 10
- Babylonian Talmud pages: 119
- Jerusalem Talmud pages: 44
- Tosefta chapters: 11

Bava Metzia (Jewish Babylonian Aramaic: בָּבָא מְצִיעָא, "The Middle Gate") is the second of the first three Talmudic tractates in the order of Nezikin ("Damages"), the other two being Bava Kamma and Bava Batra. Originally all three formed a single tractate called Nezikin (torts or injuries), each Bava being a Part or subdivision. Bava Metzia discusses civil matters such as property law and usury. It also examines one's obligations to guard lost property that has been found, or property explicitly entrusted to him.

== Mishnah ==
The Mishnah of Bava Metzia contains ten chapters.

=== Honorary trustee (Shomer Hinam), chapters 1-3 ===
An honorary trustee is one who finds lost property. He has to keep it as shomer hinam (watching over another's property without receiving any remuneration) until he can restore it to the rightful owner (Deut 22:1–3). The laws as to what constitutes finding, what to do with the things found, how to guard against false claimants, how to take care of the property found, under what conditions the finder of a thing is bound to take care of it, and under what conditions he is not so obligated—all this is explained in the first two chapters. A trustee who takes no payment is only responsible for such loss of the entrusted property as has been caused through the trustee's negligence (peshi'ah). The mode of procedure in such cases, and the laws concerning eventual fines, are discussed in 2:1; all other laws concerning the responsibilities and the rights of the shomer hinam are contained in 3:4–12.

=== Sale and Trust, chapters 4-5 ===
Contains various laws concerning sale and exchange. The payment of money does not finalize the sale; and the buyer may legally cancel the sale and claim a refund until he has "drawn" the purchased item away from its place: this "drawing" (meshikhah) makes the sale final. Until such act is performed the seller is to some extent a shomer hinam of the money paid. Similarly, the buyer may become a shomer hinam of the thing bought, if, on finding that he has been cheated, he wants to cancel the sale, to return the thing bought, and to claim the money back. What constitutes cheating / fraud (onaah) is defined in the course of this chapter, stating that where the seller charges one-sixth (1/6) more than the going price, it is counted as fraud, or overcharging.

Chapter 5 deals with laws concerning interest, which have nothing in common with the laws concerning shomer hinam beyond the fact that taking interest and cheating (onaah of chapter 4) both consist of an illegal addition to what is actually due. The laws prohibiting the taking of interest are very severe, and extend to all business transactions that in any way resemble the taking of interest. The two terms for interest appearing in Lev 25:36, neshekh (interest), and tarbit (increase), are explained and illustrated by examples (5:1–10). According to the Mishnah "the lender, who takes interest, the borrower who pays it, the witnesses, the security, and the clerk who writes the document, are all guilty of having broken the law concerning interest" (5:11). See Loans and interest in Judaism.

=== A paid trustee (Shomer Sakhar), chapters 6-7 ===
A paid trustee is liable to pay for all losses except those caused by an accident (ones). He has to swear that such an accident happened, and is thereupon free from payment (7:8–10). The example given in the Mishnah of shomer sakhar is that of an artisan who undertakes to produce certain work out of a given material. If the material is spoiled, or the work produced is not according to agreement, he has to pay. As the hirer (sokher) has the same liability as the shomer sakhar, some laws relating to the sokher are included in chapter 6. From the paid trustee the Mishnah passes over (chapter 7) to the workman (po'el) in general, and regulates the working time, the food, and also the rights of the workman to partake of the fruit of the field or vineyard while working there (Deut 23:25–26).

=== Borrower (Shoel), chapter 8:1-3 ===
A borrower or hirer is liable to pay for every kind of loss, including loss through accident, except "if the lender is with him" (Exodus 22:14); that is, according to the traditional interpretation, if the lender was likewise at work with him, for payment or without payment.

=== Hirer (Sokher), chapters 8:6-9 and 9 ===
The laws of a sokher of movable property having been given in chapter 6, Mishnah 8:6-9 and 9:1-10 discuss the sokher of immovable property; and the relations between the tenant of a house and his landlord, and between the farmer of a field and its owner. Among the laws that regulate these relations are the following: If the tenant takes a house for a year, and the year happens to be a leap year, the tenant occupies the house thirteen months for the same price. The tenant cannot be evicted in the winter between Sukkot and Passover, unless notice be given one month before the beginning of the winter. In large towns and for shops, one year's notice is required.

9:11-12, taking up again the subject of hiring, regulate the various terms for paying the due wages (based on Lev 19:13 and Deut 24:14–15). The last section of chapter 9 defines the rights of the creditor in accordance with Deut 24:6,10–13.

The final chapter (10) regulates the relations between joint owners and neighbors, in dwellings and in fields. The last case mentioned is especially interesting as showing a highly developed state of agricultural jurisdiction in the Mishnaic days.

== Tosefta and Gemara ==
The Tosefta in Bava Metzia is divided into eleven chapters, which correspond to the ten chapters of the Mishnah in the following way: Chapters 1-2 correspond to chapters 1-2 of the Mishnah; chapter 3 to chapters 3-4 of the Mishnah; chapters 4-6 to chapter 5 of the Mishnah; chapter 7 — which begins "he who hires workmen" (po'alin) instead of "he who hires artisans" (umanin) — to Mishnah 6:1; and chapter 8 correspond to chapters 6-8 of the Mishnah; chapters 9-10 to chapter 9; chapter 11 to chapter 10 of the Mishnah.

The Gemara, in explaining the laws of the Mishnah, discusses a variety of similar problems, especially the Babylonian Gemara; the Jerusalem version being very meager in this respect. Rabbi Zeira, coming from Babylonia to Jerusalem, is said to have fasted a hundred times within a certain period of time, praying that he might forget the Babylonian Gemara, and fully grasp the teachings of Rabbi Yochanan, the Jerusalem master. According to Rashi, the rabbis of Jerusalem were not of a contentious disposition, and settled difficulties without much discussion (compare p. 38b: "Are you from Pumbedita, where they make an elephant pass through the eye of a needle?").
