= Nezikin =

Fourth Order of the Mishnah and Talmud

Nezikin (Hebrew: נזיקין Neziqin, "Damages") or Seder Nezikin (סדר נזיקין, "The Order of Damages") is the fourth Order of the Mishna (also the Tosefta and Talmud). It deals largely with Jewish criminal and civil law and the Jewish court system.

Nezikin contains ten volumes (or "tractates"):

1. Bava Kamma (בבא קמא, First Gate) deals with civil matters, largely damages and compensation. 10 chapters. (See also Shomer)
2. Bava Metzia (בבא מציעא, Middle Gate) deals with civil matters, largely torts and property law. 10 chapters.
3. Bava Batra (בבא בתרא, Last Gate) deals with civil matters, largely land ownership. 10 chapters.
4. Sanhedrin (סנהדרין, The Sanhedrin) deals with the rules of court proceedings in the Sanhedrin, the death penalty, and other criminal matters. 11 chapters.
5. Makkot (מכות, Lashes) deals with colluding witnesses, cities of refuge and the punishment of lashes. 3 chapters.
6. Shevu'ot (שבועות, Oaths) deals with the various types of oaths and their consequences. 8 chapters.
7. Eduyot (עדויות, Testimonies) presents case studies of legal disputes in Mishnaic times and the miscellaneous testimonies that illustrate various Sages and principles of halakha. 8 chapters.
8. Avodah Zarah (עבודה זרה, Foreign worship) deals with the laws of interactions between Jews and Gentiles and/or idolaters (from a Jewish perspective). 5 chapters.
9. Avot (אבות, Fathers) is a collection of the Sages' favourite ethical maxims. 6 chapters.
10. Horayot (הוריות, Decisions) deals with the communal sin-offering brought for major errors by the Sanhedrin. 3 chapters.

Originally, the first three volumes were counted as one single, very lengthy volume. Since it was the chief repository of "civil" law, it was simply called Massekhet Nezikin ("Tractate Damages").

The traditional reasoning for the order of the volumes of Nezikin is as follows: The Order begins with civil law (the first 3 tractates) because it is considered the cornerstone of righteousness within a Jewish state. Sanhedrin naturally follows, as it deals with criminal law. Next comes Makkot, as it is a continuation of Sanhedrin's subject matter in terms of criminal procedure. Then, Shevuot, which continues the general topic dealt with in Makkot of the false testimony. After outlining the main points of civil and criminal law, Eduyot follows to fit it all into a halakhic framework. After dealing with "damages" within a society, the next stage is Avodah Zarah placed after to highlight what is seen as behavior that inflicts damage on the universe. Avot is probably placed next to counteract the negativity of the laws of Avodah Zarah and to relate maxims of the Sages, an essential aspect of whose teaching was to counteract idolatry. Finally, Horayot brings the discussion from lofty heights to a humble note, highlighting the concept that even the Sages and battei din can err.

There is both a Babylonian and Jerusalem Talmud to each of the tractates except for Eduyot and Avot. This is probably because these two tractates aren't concerned with individual laws and therefore don't lend themselves to a Gemara style analysis.
