= Shomer =

Hebrew term having legal applications

In Jewish religious law (halacha), a shomer (Hebrew: שומר, pl. שומרים, shom(e)rim) is a Jewish legal guardian entrusted with the custody and care of another's object.

The laws of shomrim (pl. "keepers"; "watchmen") are derived from the Torah in the Book of Exodus (Shemot 22:6-14). It is also discussed in the Talmud in the Bava Kamma and Bava Metzia tractates, which deal with torts, usury, and property law.

There are four types of shomrim: an unpaid custodian, a paid custodian, a borrower, and a renter (shomer ḥinnam, shomer sakhar, shoel, and sokher, respectively). Each shomer has distinct laws in halacha that apply to it. The two major factors that determine a guardian's liability are whether the guardian has the ability to use the item (i.e., a renter or borrower) and whether money is exchanged. In general, having the ability to use the item and being a paid custodian increase the guardian's liability, while paying for the use of something (i.e., being a renter) decreases the guardian's liability.

== Types of shomrim ==
Liabilities of Shomrim
	Negligence	Theft	Loss	Unavoidable Damage	Damage from Normal Wear
Shomer chinnam	Yes	No	No	No	No
Shomer Sakhar	Yes	Yes	Yes	No	Yes
Sokher	Yes	Yes	Yes	No	Yes
Shoel	Yes	Yes	Yes	Yes	No

=== Shomer chinam ===
A shomer shinam (Hebrew: שומר חנם, pl. שומרי חנם, shomrei chinam), or unpaid watchman, is one who watches an item without receiving payment for his watching. Shomrei cḥinnam are liable only for damages that result from their own negligence. They must pay for damages that result from their negligence.

The shomer cḥinnam does not have permission to use the item he or she is entrusted with.

=== Shomer sakhar ===
A shomer sakhar (Hebrew: שומר שכר, pl. שומרי שכר, shomrei sakhar), or paid watchman, also known as a noseh sakhar (Hebrew: נושא שכר, one who receives payment) is one who watches an item in exchange for compensation. In addition to the obligations of the shomer ḥinnam, shomrei sakhar are liable if the item is stolen. Armed robbery is exempted from this responsibility, however, as it is considered beyond the custodian's reasonable control.

Shomrei shakhar are also liable if the item is lost or misplaced, even if the loss was not a result of negligence.

In addition to the paid watchman's heightened level of liability, in certain ways the shomer sakhar is expected to perform a higher level of custodianship. A shomer sakhar, for example, cannot watch an item in a way that would only protect it from a reasonable wind, but rather must watch an item in a way as to protect it from any possible wind, and the absence of such would make the shomer liable.

The shomer sakhar also may not use the item entrusted.

=== Sokher ===
A sokher (Hebrew: שוכר) is a renter. The liabilities of a sokher are the same as those of a shomer sakhar.

=== Sho'el ===
A shoel (Hebrew: שואל) is a borrower. The shoel is liable for the entrusted item in all circumstances, including those that are not the shoel's fault, known as Onsim (Hebrew: אונסים, sing. אונס, Ones). The shoel's only exemption is for damage resulting from the normal use of the item, for example if a borrowed ox dies as a result of normal plowing.

== Biblical sources for shomrim ==
The gemara in tractate Bava Metzia discusses the biblical sourcing of each of the categories of shomrim. The gemara concludes that Exodus 22:6–8 refers to the shomer ḥinnam, 22:9-12 to the shomer sakhar, 22:13-14 to the shoel, and 22:14 to the sokher.

== Becoming a shomer ==
Generally, one must be willing to become a shomer in order to assume liability, and as such cannot be forced to watch an item. In certain circumstances, such as when one encounters a lost item, the Torah dictates that until the item is returned, the person assumes the liability and responsibility of a shomer sakhar.

== The Shomrim's Oath ==
In order for a shomer to verify the circumstances of the entrusted item's loss, shomrim are required to swear a group of oaths in Beit Din. The oaths required of a shomer typically include swearing how the item was lost, swearing that the shomer had not been negligent, and swearing that the shomer had not misappropriated the item.
