= Isha katlanit =

Married woman who has become a widow twice

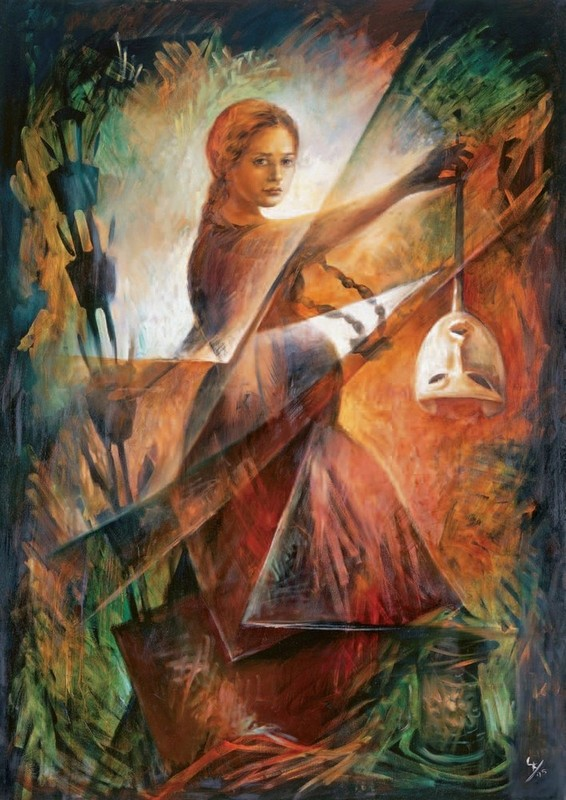
Portrait of Tamar by Lidia Kozenitzky

Isha katlanit (Hebrew: אישה קטלנית, literally: "lethal/deadly woman") is used in halakha ("Jewish law") for a married woman who has become a widow twice. Such a woman, it is said, should not marry again, because marrying her carries the risk that her next husband may also die (i.e., she will become the "cause" of his death because her marriage to her two previous husbands ended when they died.)

The origin of this rule is Talmudic. There is a dispute in the Talmud about whether a woman becomes a katlanit ("causing death") after the death of two husbands or the death of three husbands. The conclusion is that two are enough to define a katlanit, a term of art found in post-Talmudic literature.

The Talmud presents two reasons why marrying a katlanit is risky:

- According to the first reason, the "bad luck" or "misfortune" of the katlanit may endanger her husband.
- The second reason is that her "fountain" (i.e., a euphemism for vagina), can have a "risky nature."

Maimonides maintains that if one has already married such a woman, he has no obligation to divorce her according to Jewish law. Other rabbis, including Rabbi Asher ben Jehiel, take a more rigorous position. In their opinion, a man is not an "owner" of his life, so he has no right to endanger it. Consequently, one who married a katlanit must divorce her.

Technically, the isha katlanit rule may still be valid for those who adhere to Orthodox Judaism. As a practical matter, however, rabbinic authorities have substantially curtailed the relevance of the principles, thanks partly to the rabbinic principle of "The Lord protects the simple" from unusual dangers. In addition, rabbinic authorities have expressed in responsa their concern that widows be allowed to remarry, both for their own moral benefit and for the sake of the Jewish population. Today it is accepted that deaths of old husbands (over age 70) or deaths of husbands caused by an obvious accident are not reasons to define a woman as a katlanit. Unnatural causes, though, may activate the rule.

== Sources ==
- Maimonides. Mishneh Torah H. Issurei Bi'ah 21:31
- Bloom, Amram. Beit She’arim YD 320
- Breisch, Jacob. Helkat Ya'akov. Note: Case of woman whose first husband dies in a car accident and second in an airplane crash.
- Isserlein, Israel. Terumat ha-Deshen 211. Note: he overrules Maimonides based on concern for the woman's moral well-being and for Jewish continuity since she would effectively be an agunah.
- Shabtai, David and Raymond Sultan. "Medical Risk Taking in Halacha" in Journal of Halacha and Contemporary Society, 2006.
- Zbihi, Pinhas. Ateret Paz Part I, V.3, EH 3, 5748. Note: Case of woman whose first husband dies in a racing car accident and, after she converted to Judaism, her second husband died. web version
