= Yitzhak Frank =

Israeli rabbi and Talmud teacher

- יצחק פרנק
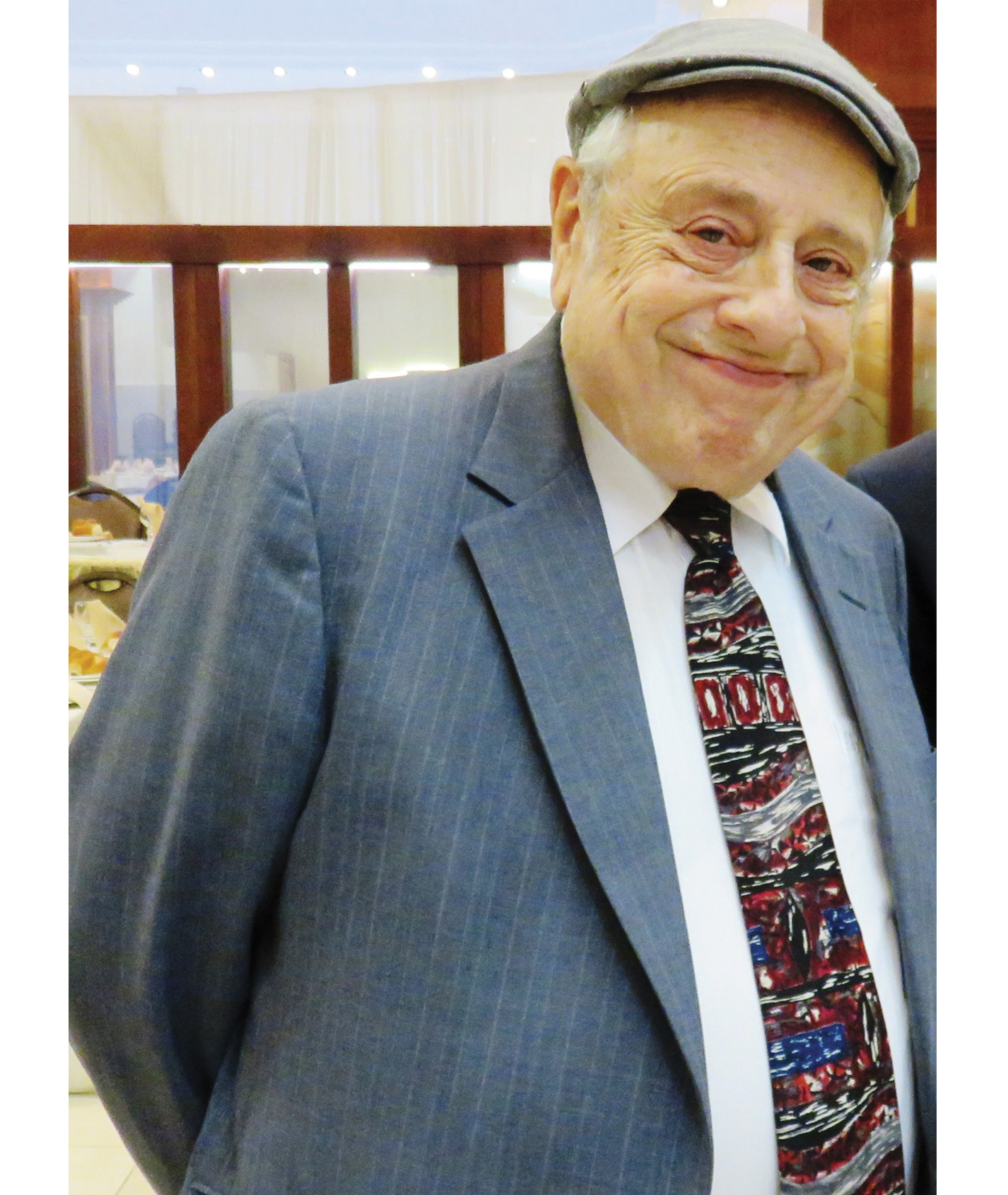
- Born: Elliott Michael Frank; 4 February 1940 (age 86); Worcester, Massachusetts, United States
- Education: B.A. in English, Yeshiva University; M.S. in Religious Education, Yeshiva University; Rabbinic ordination, Yeshivath Rabbenu Yitzhak Elhanan
- Occupations: Rabbi, Talmud teacher, Author
- Employer(s): Yeshiva of Shapell College of Jewish Studies, Various yeshivoth in Israel and New York
- Known for: Teaching Talmud and Aramaic, Author of The Practical Talmud Dictionary
- Awards: Prize of the Israeli Minister of Education (1992/1993)

Yitzhak Frank (Hebrew: יצחק פרנק) is an Israeli rabbi and a teacher of Talmud in Israel. He has made 11 publications between 1991 and 2001. His works are used as teaching material for Talmud students and rabbis in the Jewish schools in Israel. His book The practical Talmud dictionary has won the Prize of the Israeli Minister of Education.

== Biography ==
Elliott Michael Frank was born February 4, 1940, in Worcester, Massachusetts, the son of Abraham S. Frank (died 1984) and Sylvia Frank (died 2001). He married Marcia Davis, who is a daughter of Dr. Benjamin L. Davis (died 1992) and Adele B. Davis (died 2005).

Rabbi Frank grew up in Worcester. He first studied Aramaic with Rav Michael Bernstein and after that he studied in Yeshiva University New York. He earned a BA in English and a M.S. in Religious Education and semicha ("rabbinic ordination") at Yeshiva University under Yeshivath Rabbenu Yitzhak Elhanan. He was a member of the kollel, which was headed by Rav Aharon Lichtenstein. He taught together with Rabbi Nathan Kamenetsky at Yeshiva of Shapell College of Jewish Studies in Jerusalem and taught Jewish studies at yeshivoth in New York. He studied also at the Telshe Yeshiva in Wickliffe, Ohio, also known as the Rabbinical College of Telshe, (commonly referred to as Telz Yeshiva or Telz in short). In 1971 he went to Israel, where he lives in Sanhedria HaMurhevet 109/22 in Jerusalem and teaches gemara and Aramaic. In Israel he worked together with Rav Professor Ezra Zion Melamed.

== Prize of the Israeli Minister of Education (1992/1993) ==
In 1992 The practical Talmud dictionary has won the Prize of the Israeli Minister of Education.

== Publications ==
- Grammar for Gemara : an introduction to Babylonian Aramaic
- Grammar for Gemara and Targum Onkelos : an introduction to Aramaic by Yitzḥak Frank Ariel, United Israel Institutes; Nanuet, New York, Feldheim Publishers, Jerusalem 2003.
- Dayḳaʼ nami : diḳduḳ la-Talmud ha-Bavli u-le-Targum ʼOnḳelos (Hebrew: דיקא נמי : דקדוק לתלמוד הבבלי ולתרגום אונקלוס) Feldhaim (Hebrew:פלדהיים) Yerushalayim 1996
- Ḥamishah ḥumshe Torah Ariʼel (Hebrew:חמשה חומשי תורה אריאל ) oder The Ariel Chumash : Rashi, Onkelos, sources, Analysis United Israel Institutes, Jerusalem [5757, 1997]
- Ariel's practical guide to the Talmud : including the practical Talmud dictionary and grammar for Gemara with new additions and corrections
- Grammar for Gemara and Targum Onkelos
- with Ezra Zion Melamed: The practical Talmud dictionary Ariel, United Israel Institutes; Spring Valley, N.Y. : Feldheim Publishers, Jerusalem 1991
