= Smoking in Jewish law =

Halakha (Jewish religious law) addresses a number of topics applicable to tobacco and cigarette smoking. These include the health impacts of smoking; the permissibility of smoking on holidays and fast days, concerns related to kashrut (Jewish dietary laws) and the impacts of smoking on people besides the smokers themselves, such as those relating to second-hand, and third-hand smoke.

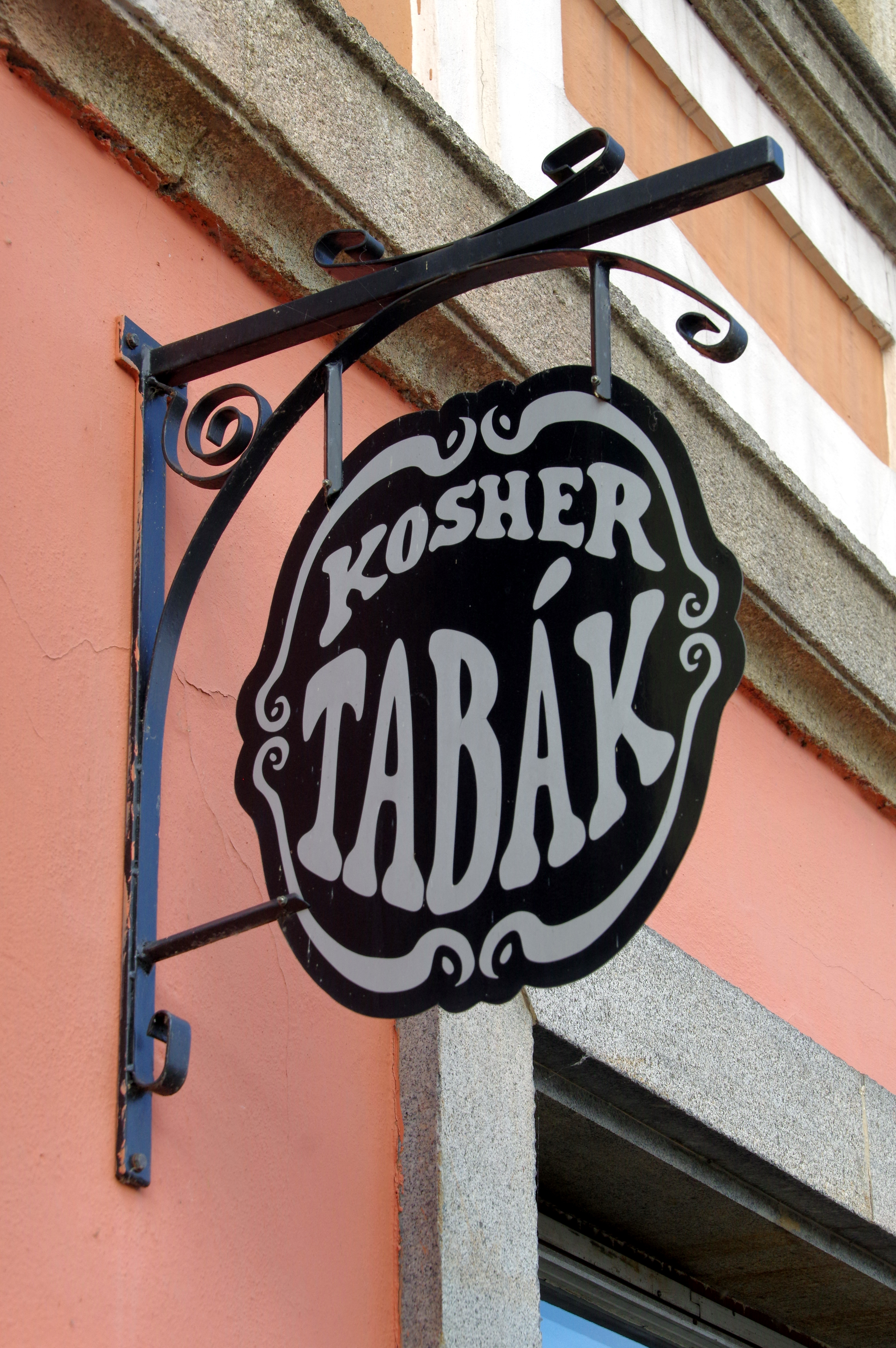
Kosher tobacco shop in Cheb, Czech Republic

== Historical background ==
Until the late 20th century, the use of tobacco for smoking and in the form of snuff was common among Jews. It is speculated that a Jew named Luis de Torres, who accompanied Christopher Columbus on his expedition in 1492, settled in Cuba, learned the use of tobacco, and introduced it into Europe. From this time, Jews were connected with the trade in tobacco.

== Ritual concerns ==
As early as the 17th century, rabbis debated various halachic issues that arose in connection with tobacco use, particularly its permissibility on holidays, fast days, and whether a blessing must be recited before use, as well as issues pertaining to Kashrut (Jewish dietary laws), particularly with regard to the prohibition of chametz on Passover. Among the early sources are Keneset ha-Gedolah by Rabbi Chaim Benveniste (1603–1673) and Magen Avraham by Rabbi Avraham Gombiner (1635–1683).

Gombiner referred to the "drinking of tobak [tobacco] through a pipe by drawing the smoke into the mouth and discharging it," and was undecided on whether a smoker should first make a blessing over smoking as a type of refreshment. Believing that tobacco was soaked in beer—a kind of chametz—he banned smoking during Passover.

Benveniste expressed himself very forcibly against smoking tutun (tobacco) on Tisha BeAv, and reportedly excommunicated a Jew who smoked on that solemn fast-day. Benveniste pointed out the inconsistency of those authorities who permit smoking on holidays because it is a 'necessity,' a 'means of sustaining life,' and who allow it on fast-days because smoke has no 'substance' like food. In Benveniste's opinion, smoking was prohibited on holidays; he quoted Rabbi Joseph Escapa as coinciding in this view, though he thought it unwise to enforce a generally accepted law.

Writing in Turkey, an Islamic country, Benveniste further argued that smoking on fast days is Chillul Hashem (a defamation of God's name), because Muslims refraining from smoking on fast-days would see Jews smoking on theirs. Despite such concerns, some Jews did smoke on Shabbat using hookas prepared before Shabbat, or else visited Muslim neighbors to enjoy the smoke in their homes. Rabbinic authorities banned this practice on the grounds that Gentiles would consider Judaism as ridiculous.

The Turkish narghile, in which the smoke passes through water, early became popular; Benveniste rules that the "tumbak" (cake of tobacco, over which a burning coal is placed at the other end of the narghile) extinguishes the fire, which is forbidden on holidays as well as Shabbat. Gombiner prohibits tumbak because it is like "mugmar" (spice for burning), mentioned in the Talmud, which likewise is prohibited. This, however, is disputed by R. Mordechai haLevi who permits the use of the narghile on holidays. The controversy finally ended in a victory for those rabbis who permitted the use of tobacco on holidays and fast-days, except on Yom Kippur, which is like Sabbath; however, some Jews still abstain from smoking on Tisha BeAv.

Unlike smoking, the use of snuff was allowed on the Sabbath, holidays, fast-days, and Yom Kippur. Jacob Hagiz (1620–1674) quotes a responsum of Isaiah Pinto permitting the use of snuff on the Sabbath, even though it cures catarrh; for everybody, even healthy people, use snuff, and it can not therefore be considered a drug.

== Moral concerns ==
The Chofetz Chaim (1838–1933) sought to dissuade practitioners from smoking. He considered it a waste of time, and saw the practice of people borrowing cigarettes from each other as questionable.

The famous Rabbi Moshe Feinstein (1895-1986) prohibited smoking in any place where other people are found, on the grounds that it causes them distress (even ignoring health impacts).

The early modern responsa literature addresses the question of students smoking in their batei midrash and synagogues. Some rabbis sought to outlaw smoking and the use of snuff in places of worship and posted notices for study halls. Many leading acharonim prohibited smoking in batei midrash and synagogues on the grounds that smoking is a frivolous activity that does not show respect for the holiness of these places.

== Health concerns ==
When 20th century medicine discovered the negative effects of smoking on health, the question arose whether smoking is to be considered strictly forbidden by halakha, or merely discouraged. The debate about the permissibility of smoking according to halakha is centered primarily around the prohibition for a person to cause harm to his body, place himself in danger, or bring about his death.

The majority of contemporary halakhic authorities rule that smoking is outright forbidden, their argument being that since there is a clear causal link between smoking and deadly diseases, such as cancer and cardiovascular disease, it constitutes a violation of the obligation of one to safeguard his health. However, Rabbi Moshe Feinstein wrote a responsum stating that while inadvisable and inappropriate, smoking was permitted for one who had already started. Feinstein explained that since the risk of illness or death due to smoking is considered small, and it is a widespread practice, it is therefore permitted under the rabbinical principle based on the verse of Pslams : "The Lord protects the simple." However, he wrote that it should be considered forbidden for one to begin smoking, as it entails 'straying toward material pleasures', and called on parents, including those who themself smoke, to ensure that their children do not begin smoking. According to students, when informed of the dangers of smoking, Rabbi Aaron Kotler ruled that smoking was a biblical transgression. Many Haredi rabbis have called on people not to smoke and called smoking an 'evil habit'. These rabbis include Rabbi Yosef Sholom Eliashiv, Rabbi Aharon Leib Shteinman, Rabbi Moshe Shmuel Shapiro, Rabbi Michel Yehuda Lefkowitz, Rabbi Nissim Karelitz, and Rabbi Shmuel Auerbach. Rabbi Shmuel HaLevi Wosner forbade people from starting to smoke and said that those who smoke are obligated to do everything they can to stop. All of these rabbis also said that it is forbidden to smoke in a public place, where others might be bothered by it.

Among important Sephardi Haredi rabbis, Rabbi Ben Tzion Abba Shaul and Rabbi Moshe Tzadka called on youth not to start smoking.

Other major Ashkenazi rabbis who explicitly forbade smoking include Rabbi Eliezer Waldenberg, Rabbi Moshe Stern, and Rabbi Chaim Pinchas Sheinberg.

Smoking is specifically prohibited by Solomon Freehof, other Reform rabbis, as well as rabbis in the Conservative movement in the U.S. and Israel.

There is a custom still practiced today by Hasidic and some Haredi grooms who hand out free cigarettes to their friends at their vort (engagement party). Recent rulings against smoking by great rabbis do not have seemed to have stopped the tradition. Early on in the Hasidic movement, the Baal Shem Tov taught that smoking tobacco can be used as a religious devotion, and can even help bring the Messianic Era. Rabbi Levi Yitzchok of Berditchev is quoted as saying that "a Jew smokes on the weekdays and sniffs tobacco on the Sabbath". Rabbi Dovid of Lelov taught that it is a good religious practice to smoke on Saturday nights after the Sabbath, and this practice is followed by the Rebbes of Lelov and Skulen, however the current Rebbe of Skulen discourages people from following his example, in light of current views opposing smoking, and he himself only takes a few brief puffs of a cigarette after Havdalah. Many Hasidic Jews smoke, and many who do not smoke regularly will smoke on the holiday of Purim, even if they do not do so any other time of the year, and some consider it to be a spiritual practice, similar to the smoke of the altar in the ancient Temple. However, many Hasidic rabbis oppose smoking.

In 2006, the Vaad Halacha (Jewish law committee), sponsored by the Rabbinical Council of America, ruled that the use of tobacco is forbidden to Jews, and the committee specifically cited and reversed precedents that permitted smoking.
