= The Lord protects the simple =

Phrase from the Hebrew Bible

The Lord protects the simple is a phrase from a verse in the Hebrew Bible. In Judaism, the phrase has both a plain meaning and another meaning due to rabbinic exegesis.

== From Psalms ==
Psalm 116:6 states: "The Lord protects the simple, I was brought low and he saved me." According to the plain meaning of this verse, the Psalmist is expressing confidence and gratitude to the divine.

This verse (and Psalm) are recited by Jews in the liturgical thanksgiving prayer, the Hallel.

Over time, the phrase has evolved into the English idiom, "God watches over children and fools," occasionally including "drunks," along with variations of the terms used. Modern English translations of the Bible have substituted "the helpless" or "the foolish" at times.

== Rabbinic tradition ==
In the rabbinic tradition, this verse takes on an entirely different and quite important meaning. The verse represents a principle of Jewish law (halakha) that permits people to assume various low-level risks and dangers. Risk may be taken because, as the verse states, the deity protects people who are "simple" (פתאים). In Jewish ethics and law, the principle of "The Lord protects the simple" has been applied at times to permit cigarette smoking, circumcision at inauspicious moments, bloodletting, unprotected intercourse for women perceived to be at risk, and such instances as the marriage of a woman whose previous two husbands had died ("isha katlanit").
