= Bava Kamma =

Tractate of the Talmud

Tractate of the Talmud
- Seder: Nezikin
- Number of mishnahs: 79
- Chapters: 10
- Babylonian Talmud pages: 119
- Jerusalem Talmud pages: 44
- Tosefta chapters: 11

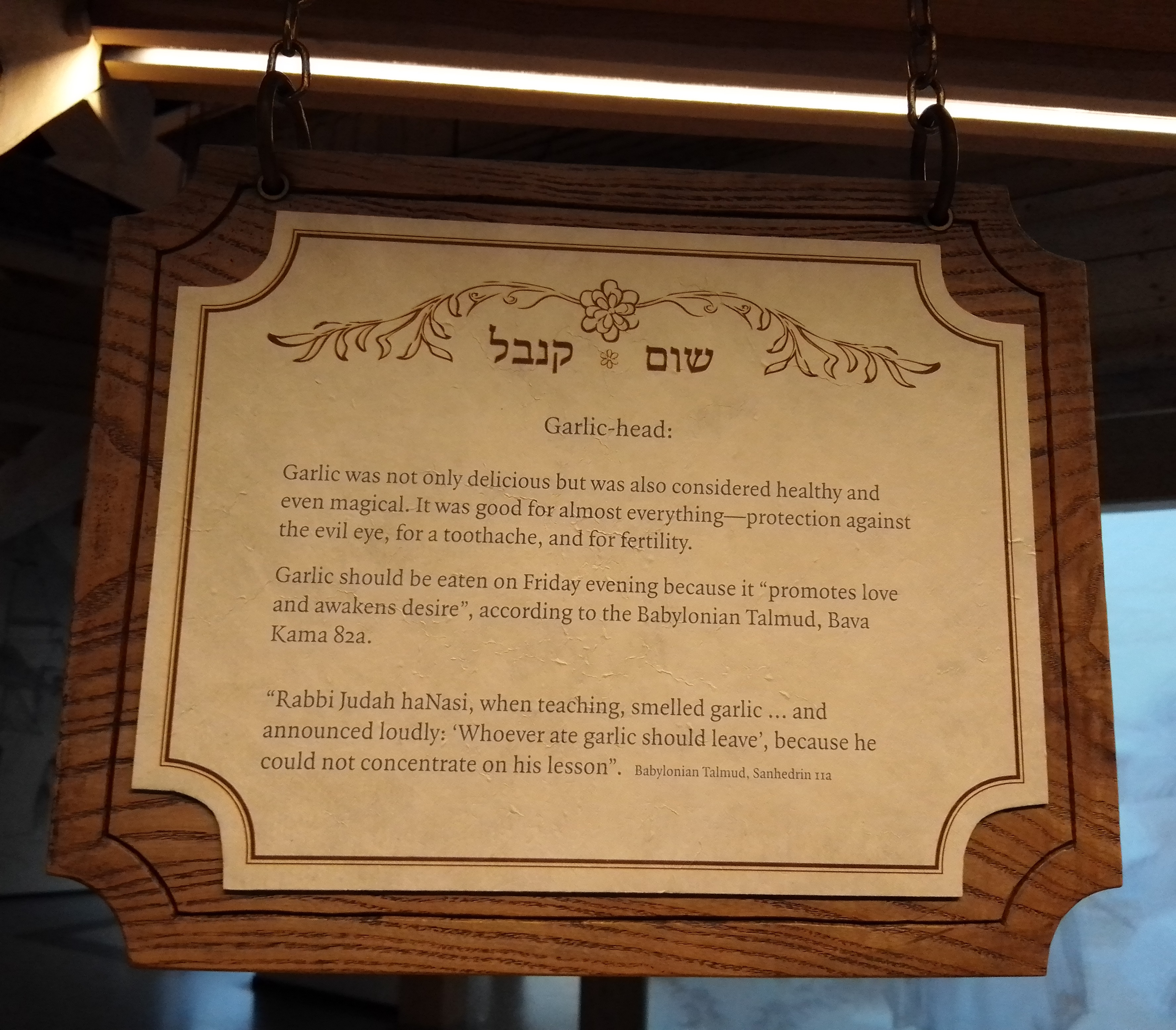
A plaque about garlic referencing Bava Kamma 82a, Museum of the History of Polish Jews

Bava Kamma (Jewish Babylonian Aramaic: בָּבָא קַמָּא, romanized: Bāḇā Qammā, lit. 'The First Gate') composed in Babylon circa 450–550 CE, is the first of a series of three Talmudic tractates in the order Nezikin ("Damages") that deal with civil matters such as damages and torts. The other two of these tractates are Bava Metzia ('The Middle Gate') and Bava Batra ('The Last Gate'): originally all three formed a single tractate called Nezikin, each "Bava" meaning "part" or "subdivision." Bava Kamma discusses various forms of damage and the compensation owed for them.

Biblical laws dealing with the cases discussed in Bava Kamma are contained in the following passages: Exodus 21:18–19, and Exodus 21:24–22:5. The principle that underlies the legislation in this respect is expressed by the sentence, "He that kindled the fire shall surely make restitution". Exodus 22:5

Bava Kamma consists of ten chapters which may be grouped as follows: damage caused without criminality (chaps. 1-6); damage caused by a criminal act (chaps. 7-10).

== Mishna ==
=== Damage caused without criminality ===
Two types of damages are dealt with: (1) damage caused by agents in their normal condition; (2) damage caused by agents in their abnormal condition. An instance of the first class of agents is an ox treading upon things that are in his way and thus damaging them, or eating things that are in his path. An instance of the second class is the case of a Goring Ox, as under normal circumstances an ox does not gore.

==== Agents in their normal condition ====
The Mishnah (1:1) identifies four of the heads or agents of damage ("avot nezikin", literally, fathers of damages): Ox (shor), Pit (bor), Mav'eh (meaning either damages caused by man, or those caused by an animal's feeding), Burning (hev'er). These four agents correspond to those mentioned in Exodus 22:4 [R. V. 5], Exodus 21:33–34, Exodus 22:4–5 [A. V. 5–6].

The law concerning the compensation in these cases is expressed in the Mishnah (1:1) thus: "These four agents have in common the circumstance that they usually cause damage; that the owner has the duty to prevent the damage; and that if he fails to do so, on damage being done he must pay full compensation, with the best of his property" (compare Exodus 22:4 [A. V. 5]). Before, however, giving the detailed regulations for these four kinds of damage, the Mishnah proceeds to the discussion of the second class of damages, those caused by agents in an abnormal condition.

==== Agents in their abnormal condition ====
The principal distinction in the second class is between harmless ("tam") and warned ("mu'ad"). The law of compensation in these two cases is as follows: In the case of an animal previously reputed harmless (tam), the owner has to compensate for half the damage, unless half the damage exceeds the whole value of the animal causing the damage. In a case where the owner has been warned (mu'ad), he must give full compensation for the damage, without regard to the value of the damaging animal (compare Exodus 21:35–36).

The law of mu'ad applies to the four kinds of damage done by animals or agents in their normal condition. In addition to these the Mishnah (1:4) enumerates the following: man, and wild beasts owned by a man—such as the wolf, the lion, the bear, and the leopard; also the serpent. Of man it is said, "Man is always fully responsible (mu'ad), whether he cause damage intentionally or unintentionally, whether awake or asleep" (2:6). This rule is illustrated by various instances given in the third chapter (1–7).

The remaining part of the third chapter, the fourth, and part of the fifth (1–4), contain regulations concerning the compensation for damage caused by a goring ox. For example, the fourth chapter asserts that the injuries one ox may inflict upon another are not assessed on equal terms depending on whether the owner of the attacking or attacked bull is a Jew or a gentile.

=== Damage by pit, grazing, or burning ===
Following the order of the avot nezikin given in the beginning of the tractate, the damage caused by a pit is discussed in the second part of the fifth chapter; and the sixth chapter is devoted to the remaining two causes of damage, grazing (1–3) and burning (4–6). Of the last section the following law is noteworthy:

"If a camel laden with flax passes through a street, and the flax catches fire from a candle that is inside a shop so that the whole shop is thereby set on fire, the owner of the camel is held responsible for the damage; if, however, the candle is outside the shop, the owner of the shop is responsible. The exemption to this liability is in the case of Hanukkah lights, as per Rabbi Yehuda's opinion".

=== Damage caused by criminal acts ===
There are three types of damages caused by a criminal act: (1) by theft (chapter 7); (2) by violence (chapter 8); (3) by robbery (chapters 9-10).

(1) "If a man steal an ox or a lamb and slaughter the same or sell it, five cattle shall he pay for the ox and four sheep for the lamb" (Exodus 21:37). The regulations as to how to apply this law under various circumstances are contained in 7:1–6.

(2) The compensation for injuries as the result of violence is discussed in chapter viii. Such compensation includes five items: for the permanent loss ("nezek"), if any, in earning capacity; loss of time ("shevet"); pain ("tza'ar"); cost of the cure ("rippuy"); and insult ("boshet"). The scale of compensation for an insult, as given in the Mishnah, seems to indicate the maximum compensation, for the Mishnah adds, "The principle is that the amount depends on the injured man's station in life." Rabbi Akiva, however, opposed this principle, and desired to have one measure for all. A practical case decided by Rabbi Akiva is then cited (8:7). In addition to all the compensation paid, the offender must beg the injured man's pardon.

(3) He who has robbed his neighbor, and desires to make restitution, pays the full value of the thing taken and a fine of one-fifth of its value. (Lev 5:21–24 [A. V. 6:2–5]). If the things taken by robbery have undergone a change, he pays according to the value the things had at the time of the robbery (chapter 9). The last chapter considers cases in which the things taken are no longer in the hands of the robber, and concludes with the warning not to buy things suspected to be stolen. With the exception of chapter 7:7 (on certain restrictions with regard to the rearing of cattle or poultry in the Land of Israel), there are neither halakhic nor aggadic digressions in this tractate.

== Jerusalem and Babylonian Talmuds ==
There are two versions of Bava Kamma: One is in the Jerusalem Talmud while the other is in the Babylonian. The two Gemaras, as usual, discuss the laws of the Mishnah; the Jerusalem Talmud rather briefly, the Babylonian Talmud more fully.

The following are a few of the principles enunciated in the Gemara: According to Symmachus ben Joseph: Property concerning which there is a doubt whether it belongs to A or to B, is divided between A and B without either being compelled to confirm his claim by oath. The sages (hakhamim) hold that he who claims what is in the possession of another, must prove his claim (hamotzi machavaro aluv haria). A person attacked on his own grounds may take the law into his own hands, when the delay caused by going to a proper court of law would involve great loss. Whenever the whole value of the damaged object is paid, the payment is considered as compensation ("mamona"); when only half the value or a certain fixed amount is paid, the payment is considered a fine ("kenasa"). The judges in Babylonia had no right to impose a fine for any offense; the case had to be tried by qualified judges in Judea.

The following incident will illustrate the last two rules: A man was charged before Rav Chisda in Babylonia with having struck a fellow man with his spade. Chisda asked Rav Nachman how much the offender had to pay. The latter replied that no fine could be imposed in the Babylonian courts, but that he desired to know the facts of the case. He ascertained that A and B had together a well, each of them with the right of drawing water on certain fixed days alone. Contrary to the agreement A drew water on a day that was not his. B noticed it and drove him away with his spade. Nachman's verdict was that B might with impunity have hit A a hundred times with the spade, as any delay would have involved a great loss to B. It is noteworthy that two codes of law are mentioned: the legal one (dinei adam, literally, "judgments of man") and the moral one (dinei shamayim, literally, "judgments of heaven"). In some cases the former absolves man of an obligation, and the latter does not.

Commenting on the four heads of damage (avot nezikin) listed in the Mishnah, the Babylonian Talmud asserts that in fact there are at least 26 heads of damages.

=== Aggadic elements ===
Noteworthy elements of aggadah include:

- A hasid (pious man) noticed a man throwing stones and rubbish from his own garden into the public thoroughfare. The hasid rebuked him, saying, "Why do you throw these things from a place that is not yours into a place that is yours?" The man laughed; but he soon learned the true meaning of the question. For he had to sell his property, and one day, walking in the street, he met with an accident through these very stones (50b).
- Joshua, on dividing the land of Canaan amongst the tribes of Israel, made the tribes agree to ten conditions, the most important of which are the common use of the forests as pasture for cattle, and the common right of fishing in the Sea of Tiberias (80b—81a). Natural springs were to be used for drinking and laundry by all tribes, although the tribe to which the water course fell had the first rights. Prickly burnet (Sarcopoterium spinosum) and the camelthorn (Alhagi maurorum) could be freely collected as firewood by any member of any tribe, in any tribal territory.
- Ezra introduced ten rules (takanot), among them the Torah reading on Shabbat afternoon (mincha), on Monday and on Thursday, and the holding of court (beth din) sittings on Mondays and Thursdays (82a).
- Two officers were once sent by the Roman governor to Gamaliel to be instructed in the Jewish law. When they had finished the study they declared to Gamaliel that the laws (referring probably to the civil code of laws) were all just and praiseworthy, with the exception of two that make a distinction between Jew and heathen. The rabbi thereupon ordered the inequality to be removed (Bavli 38a, and Yerushalmi 4 4b).
- Johanan bar Nappaha used to give to his servant part of everything he was eating or drinking, saying, "Is not his Creator also my Creator?" (Job 31:15; Yerushalmi 8 6c).
- At the funeral of King Hezekiah, a sefer Torah was laid on the bier, with the words, "This [man] fulfilled what is written in this [scroll]" (Bavli 17a).

Noteworthy explanations of Biblical texts include:

- The words ka'asher yeba'er hagalal (1 Kings 14:10) are quoted as meaning "as the tooth destroyeth" (A. V. "as a man sweepeth the dung").
- Erekh apayim ("slow to anger," Exodus 34:6) is interpreted "long-suffering to both the righteous and the wicked", on account of the dual form.
- A Biblical verse is quoted according to its sense and not literally, as, for example, mihyot tov al tikra ra (when thou art kind, thou shalt not be called bad); then the question is raised, "Is it written so?" and the verse Proverbs 3:27 is cited.
