= Jewish Babylonian Aramaic =

Middle Aramaic language once used by Jewish writers in Lower Mesopotamia

- Babylonian Talmudic Aramaic, Jewish Aramaic, Talmudic
- ארמית Ārāmît
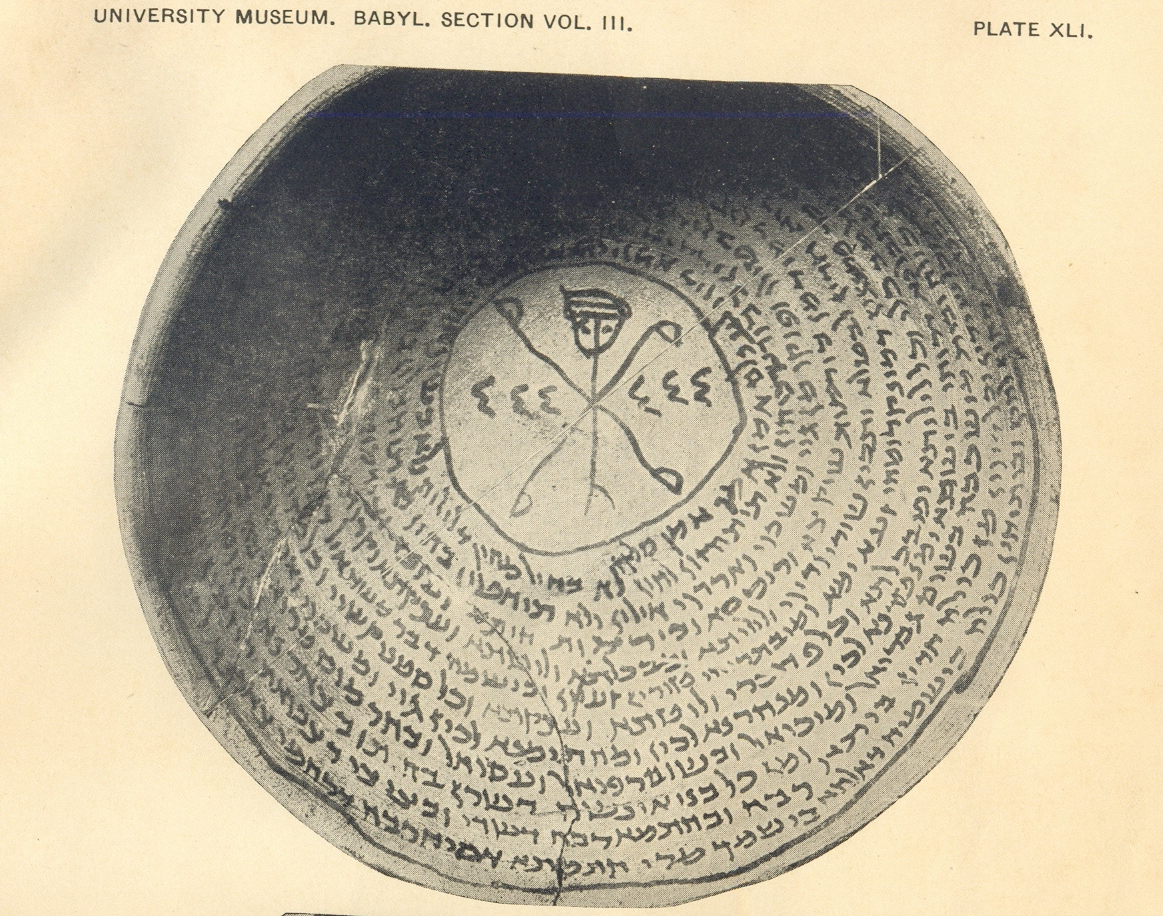
- Incantation bowl in Jewish Babylonian Aramaic
- Region: Babylonia, modern day southern and some of central Iraq
- Era: c. 200–1200 CE
- Language family: Afro-Asiatic: Semitic; Central; Northwest Semitic; Aramaic; Eastern Aramaic; Southeastern; Jewish Babylonian Aramaic
- Early form: Old Aramaic
- Writing system: Babylonian Alphabet

Language codes
- ISO 639-3: tmr
- Glottolog: jewi1240

Jewish Babylonian Aramaic (Aramaic: אַרָמִית, ʾarāmîṯ) or Talmudic Aramaic was the form of Middle Aramaic employed by writers in Lower Mesopotamia between the fourth and eleventh centuries. It is most commonly identified with the language of the Babylonian Talmud (which was completed in the fifth century), the Targum Onqelos, and of post-Talmudic (Gaonic) literature, which are the most important cultural products of Babylonian Jews. The most important epigraphic sources for the dialect are the hundreds of inscriptions on incantation bowls.

== Classification and type ==
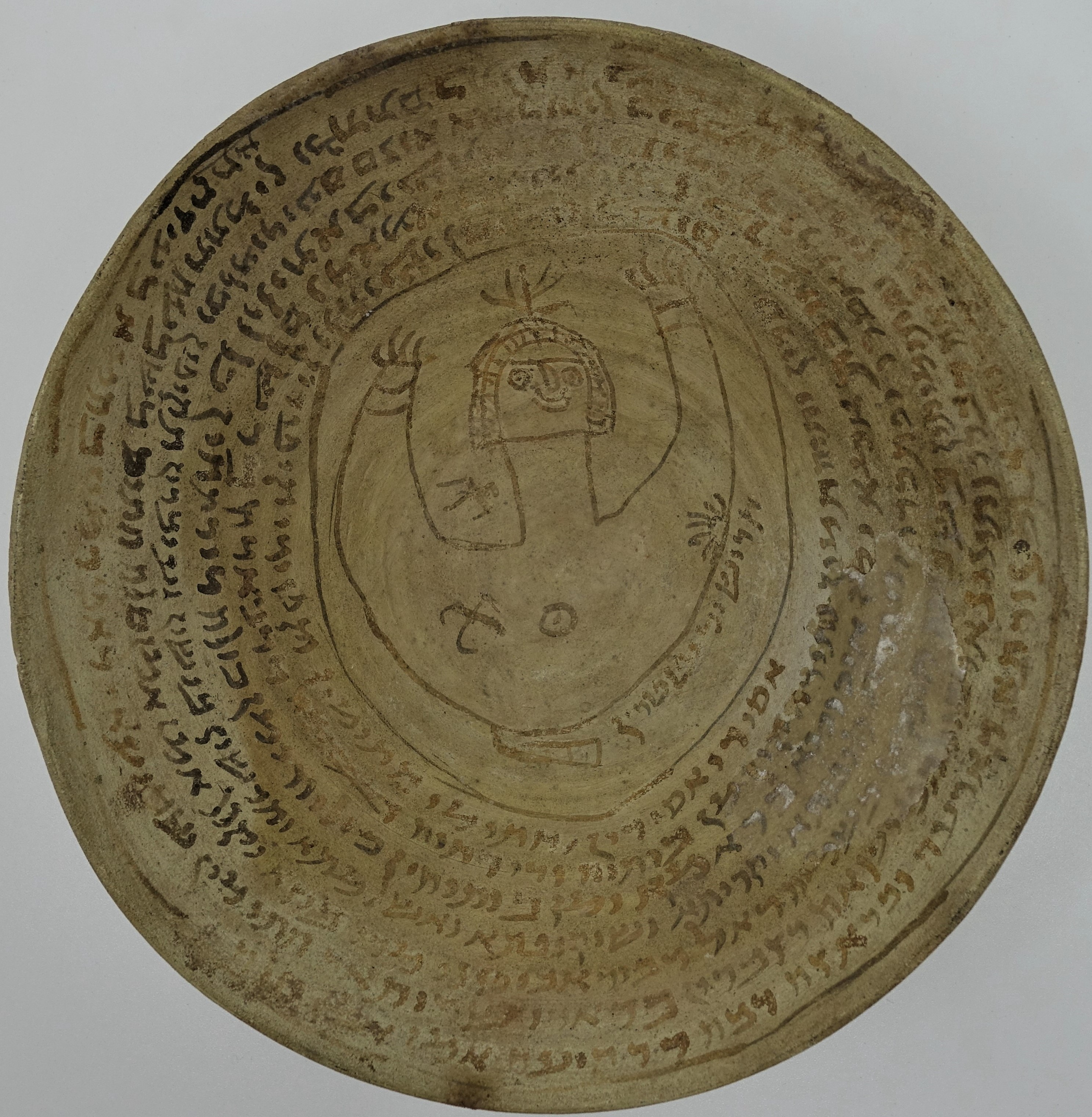
Incantation bowl inscribed in Babylonian Aramaic, using Hebrew square-script, dated between 400 and 800, in the collection of the Jewish Museum of Switzerland.

The language was closely related to Eastern Aramaic varieties such as Mandaic. Its original pronunciation is uncertain and has to be reconstructed with the help of these kindred dialects and the reading tradition of the Yemenite Jews, and where available those of the Iraqi, Syrian and Egyptian Jews. The value of the Yemenite reading tradition has been challenged by Matthew Morgenstern. Vocalized Aramaic texts with which Jews are familiar, from the Tanakh and the siddurim, are of limited usefulness for this purpose, as they are in different dialects.

Talmudic Aramaic is believed to be a specialist language of study and legal argumentation like Law French which existed alongside a vernacular dialect of Aramaic; Talmudic Aramaic continued in use for these purposes long after Judeo-Arabic languages had become used in daily life. It has developed a battery of technical logic terms such as tiyuvta "conclusive refutation" and tiqu "undecidable moot point", which are still used in Jewish legal writings, including those in other languages, and have influenced modern Hebrew.

Like the other Judeo-Aramaic languages, it was written in the Hebrew alphabet.

== Grammar ==
=== Pronouns ===
==== Independent nominative pronouns ====
Independent personal pronouns	Meaning	Examples
אנא	First person, singular, common	
את	Second person, singular, common	
הוא / איהו	Third person, singular, masculine	
היא / איהי	Third person, singular, feminine	
אנן	First person, plural, common	אנן קשישי ואינו דרדקי; We are old and they are young (bekarot 8b)
אתון	Second person, plural, masculine	אתון דשאליתו לי דיאילו; It is you that I borrowed (Baba Mesia 97a) אתון דמיקרביתו לרב; You, who are attached to Rav (Shabbat 37b)
אינהו	Third person, plural, masculine	אנן קשישי ואינו דרדקי; We are old and they are young (bekarot 8b)
אינהי	Third person, plural, feminine	

==== Copulative pronouns ====
Copulative pronouns	Meaning	Examples
נא	First person, singular, common	עדיפנא; I am more worthy (Kiddushin 29b)
ת	Second person, singular, common	עציבת; You (common singular) are sad (Pesahim 3b)
ניהו	Third person, singular, masculine	מי ידענא היכא ניהו; Do I know where he is (Sanhedrin 39a) הי ניהו which is it (Nid. 41b)
ניהי	Third person, singular, feminine	
נן	First person, plural, common	זוטרינן we are young (Baba Qama 92b)
תו(ן)	Second person, plural, masculine	חכימתו; You (masculine plural) are wise (Gitin 56b)
נינהו	Third person, plural, masculine	הני הילכתה נינהו; These are laws from tradition (they) Mo'ed Qatan 3b גזלני נינהו; Robbers, they (Baba Batra 100a) סהדי שקרי נינהו; Lying witnesses, they (Baba Batra 92b)
נינהי	Third person, plural, feminine	קדושה והבדלה חדה מילתא נינהי; Qedusha and Havdalah are one thing, they are (Pesah 102b) כולהי חדא ברכתא נינהי all one long blessing, they are (Pesah 103b)

==== Genitive pronominal suffixes ====
Genitive pronominal suffix	Genitive pronominal suffix (Hebrew)	Meaning	Examples
ַ אי	ִ י	First person, singular possessive. My	נַפְשַאי my person (jevamot 64b) דוּכְתַּאי my position (ketuvot 77b)
ִי ךְ	ְ ךָ	Second person, singular, possessive. Your	פְּסוּקִיךְ your verse (chagiga 15)
ָ ךְ	ֵ ךְ	Second person, singular, possessive. Your	רַבָּךְ your teacher (pesachim 24) שוּפְרָךְ your beauty (Bava Metzia 84a) אמר ליה {רבי יוחנן} חילך לאורייתא {כמה יפה כוחך לסבול עול תורה} אמר ליה{ריש לקיש} שופרך לנשי {יופיך ראוי לנשים}
ֵי הּ	וֹ	Third person, singular, masculine possessive. His	יְהֵא שְׁמֵיהּ רַבָּא מְבָרַךְ May his great name shall be blessed (Kaddish Shalem, 8th century)
ָ הּ	ָ הּ	Third person, singular, feminine possessive. Her	אסירא לייחודי בגברא דלא דידָהּ She is forbidden to be together in the room alone with a man who is not her husband (Erubin 100b)
ִי ן	ֵ נוּ	First person, plural possessive. Our	אַרְעִין our land (shanhedrin 94)
ַ יְכוּ	ְ כֶם	Second person, plural, masculine possessive. Your	גַבְרַיְיכוּ Your men (Shabbat 140b)
ַ יְיכִי	ְ כֶן	Second person, plural, feminine possessive. Your	קַרְחַיְיכִי your baldness (pesachim 110) פַּרְחַיְיכִי your crumbs (pesachim 110)
ַ יְהוּ	ָ ם	Third person, plural, masculine possessive. Their	מָנַיְיהוּ their clothes (Shabbat 133b) מִינַיְיהוּ(ן) from the men
ַ יְהִי	ָ ן	Third person, plural, feminine possessive. Their	עָלַיְיהִי(ן) about the women

Suffix + אִית	Meaning	Examples
אִיתֵיהּ	He is/exists	
אִיתָהּ	She is/exists	
אִיתְנָן	We are/exist	
אִיתַנְכוּ	You (pl. m.) are/exist	
אִיתַנְכִי	You (pl. f.) are/exist	
אִיתַנְהוּ	They (m.) are/exist	
אִיתַנְהִי	They (f.) are/exist	

==== Demonstrative pronoun ====
Demonstrative pronoun (near/proximal)	Meaning	Examples
הַאי(י)	Third person, singular, masculine demonstrative. This (Hebrew:זֶה)	מהַאי גִּיסָא ומהַאי גִּיסָא אַדַּעְתָּא דְדיקלא on the one side ... , on the other side with precise intention for האיי דיאנא this judge האיי קלא this voice
הָא	Third person, singular, feminine demonstrative. This (Hebrew:זֹאת)	הא מילתא this word/thing
הָ(א)נֵי	Third person, plural, masculine demonstrative. These (Hebrew:אֵלֶּה, אֵלּוּ)	הָנֵי מילי these words/things
הָנֵי	Third person, plural, feminine demonstrative. These (Hebrew:אֵלֶּה, אֵלּוּ)	הָנֵי אִין הָנַך לאָ (Chagiga 11b) (These yes, those not )

Demonstrative pronoun (medial)	Meaning	Examples
הַאי(י)+ךְ←הַאִיךְ	Third person, singular, masculine demonstrative. That	איתתיה דהאייך; His wife of that (man)
הָא+ךְ←הָךְ	Third person, singular, feminine demonstrative. That	הך ארעא that land הך לשנא that language
הָ(א)נֵי+ךְ←הָנַךְ	Third person, plural, masculine demonstrative. Those	מן הָנַךְ טעמי; Because of those reasons הָנַךְ אֲזַלוּ לְעָלְמָא והָנֵי אַחֲרִינֵי נינהו; Those others have gone away, and these are others here
הָנֵי+ךְ←הָנַךְ	Third person, plural, feminine demonstrative. Those	הָנֵי אִין הָנַך לאָ (Chagiga 11b) (These yes, those not )

Demonstrative pronoun (remote/distal)	Meaning	Examples
הָהוּ(א)	Third person, singular, masculine demonstrative. That (Hebrew:הוּא)	הָהוּא גַבְרָא (Berachot 6b) (any man, anybody, that man )
הָהִי(א)	Third person, singular, feminine demonstrative. That (Hebrew:הִיא)	הָהִיא אִתְּתָא דַאֲתָא לְקָמֵיהּ (nedarim 50b) (That woman, who came before him )
הָנְהוּ	Third person, plural, masculine demonstrative. Those (Hebrew:הֵם)	
הָנְהִי	Third person, plural, feminine demonstrative. Those (Hebrew:הֵן)	

==== Accusative pronominal suffixes ====
Accusative pronominal suffix	Meaning	Examples
ַ ן ַ ני	First person, singular, common	גַנְבַן (Nedarim 62) he stole me נַטְרַנִי he supervised me נֵיעָרְבִינְהוּ וְנִכְתְּבִינְהוּ
ך	Second person, singular, masculine	
יך	Second person, singular, feminine	
יה	Third person, feminine, singular	
ה	Third person, masculine, singular	
ה	Third person, masculine, singular	
ינן	First person, plural, common	
ינכו	second person, plural, masculine	
נכי	second person, plural, feminine	
ינון / ינ(ה)ו	Third person, plural, masculine	נֵיעָרְבִינְהוּ וְנִכְתְּבִינְהוּ (pessachim 13) he shall put them (the words) together and write them
ינון / י(נ)הי	Third person, plural, feminine	וּרְמִי אִינְהִי ← וּרְמִינְהִי (berachot 9) you shall opposite them (the two sentences)

=== Six major verbal patterns ===
There are six major verb stems or verbal patterns (binyanim) in Jewish Babylonian Aramaic. The form pe‘al (פְּעַל) “to do”, the form Aph'el (אַפְעֵל) “let do”, and the form Pa'el (פַּעֵל) “like to do”, are all in the active voice. But the form Itpe'el (אִתְפְּעֵל), the form Itaph'al (אִתַפְעַל) and the form Itpa'al (אִתְפַּעַל) are essentially reflexive and usually function in a passive sense.

Aramaic binyan	Hebrew binyan	Aramaic example	Hebrew parallel	English translation
פְּעַל Pe'al	קַל Qal/Pa'al	כְּתַב	כָּתַב	he wrote
אִתְפְּעֵל Itpe'el	נִפְעַל Niphal	אִתְכְּתֵיב	נִכְתַב	it was written
אַפְעֵל Aph'el	הִפְעִיל Hiph'il	אַפְקֵד	הִפְקִיד	he deposited
אִתַפְעַל Itaph'al	הֻפְעַל Huph‘al	אִתַפְקַד	הֻפְקַד	it was deposited
פַּעֵל Pa'el	פִּעֵל Pi'el	קַדֵּיש	קִדֵּש	he sanctifed
אִתְפַּעַל Itpa'al	הִתְפַּעֵל Hitpa'el	וְיִתְקַדַּשׁ	הִתְקַדֵּשׁ	it was sanctifed

==== Verbal pattern (binyan): pe‘al (פְּעַל) Basic Verb – Active ====
past tense

Aramaic verb WROTE	Hebrew verb parallel WROTE	Romanization of Aramaic	Romanization of Hebrew	English translation
אֲנָא כְּתַבִית	אֲנִי כָּתַבְתִּי	ana k'tavit	ani katavti	I wrote
אַתְּ כְּתַבְתְּ	אַתָּה כָּתַבְתָּ	att' k'tavt	atta katavta	you (m.) wrote
אַתְּ כְּתַבְתְּ	אַתְּ כָּתַבְתְּ	att' k'tavt	att' katavt	you (f.) wrote
הוּא כְּתַב	הוּא כָּתַב	hu k'tav	hu katav	he wrote
הִיא כְּתַבָה	הִיא כָּתְבָה	hi k'tava	hi kat'va	she wrote
אֲנָן כְּתַבִינָן	אָנוּ כָּתַבְנוּ	anan k'tavinan	anu katavnu	we wrote
אַתּוּ כְּתַבִיתּוּ	אַתֶּם כְּתַבְתֶּם	attu k'tavitu	attem k'tavtem	you (m.pl.) wrote
אינון כְּתַבוּ	הם כָּתְּבוּ	innun k'tavu	hem katvu	they (m.) wrote

Aramaic verb CAME	Hebrew verb parallel CAME	Romanization of Aramaic	Romanization of Hebrew	English translation
אֲנָא אֲתֵיתִי אֲנָא אֲתַאי	אֲנִי בָּאתִי	ana ateti/ana atai	ani bati	I came
אַתְּ אֲתֵית	אַתָּה בָּאתָ	at atet	ata bata	you (m.) came
אַתְּ ?	אַתְּ בָּאת	at ?	at bat	you (f.) came
הוּא אֲתָא	הוּא בָּא	hu ata	hu ba	he came
הִיא אֲתָת הִיא אֲתַאי הִיא אתיא	הִיא בָּאָה	i atat/atai/atjia	hi ba'a	she came
אֲנָן אֲתַאן אֲנָן אֲתַן אֲנָן אֲתֵינַן	אָנוּ בָּאנוּ	anan atan/atenan	anu banu	we came
אַתּוּ אֲתֵיתוּ	אַתֶּם בָּאתֶם	atu atetu	atem batem	you (m.pl.) came
אינון אֲתוּ	הם בָּאוּ	innun atu	hem ba'u	they (m.) came
אינין אֲתַיָין אינין אֲתַאָן יאינין אתן	הן בָּאוּ	innin attajan	hen ba'u	they (f.) came

Participle

The Aramaic verb has two participles: an active participle with suffix and a passive participle with suffix:

active participles with suffix

Aramaic active participle WRITE with suffix	Hebrew active participle WRITE	Romanization of Aramaic	Romanization of Hebrew	English translation
כָּתֵיב + אֲנָא ← כָּתֵיבְנָא	אֲנִי כּוֹתֵב	katevna←katev+ana	ani kotev	I write
כָּתֵיב + אַתְּ ← כָּתְבַתְּ	אַתָּה כּוֹתֵב	katvat← katev+ata	ata kotev	you write
כָּתְבִי + אֲנָן ← כָּתְבִינָן	אָנוּ כּוֹתְבִים	katvinan←katvi+anan	anu kotvim	we write
כָּתְבִי + אַתּוּ ← כָּתְבִיתּוּ	אַתֶּם כּוֹתְבִים	katvitu← katvi+atu	atem kotvim	you (pl.) write

Aramaic active participle COME with suffix	Hebrew active participle COME	Romanization of Aramaic	Romanization of Hebrew	English translation
אָתֵי / אָתְיָא + אֲנָא ← אָתֵינָא	אֲנִי בָּא	atena←ate+ana	ani ba	I come
אָתֵי / אָתְיָא + אַתְּ ← אָתֵיתְּ	אַתָּה בָּא	atet← ate+at	ata ba	You come
אָתוּ / אָתֵיָין + אֲנָן ← אָתִינָן	אָנוּ בָּאִים	atinan←atu+anan	anu ba'iim	we come

passive participle with suffix

Aramaic passive participle with suffix BUSY	Hebrew passive participle BUSY	Romanization of Aramaic	Romanization of Hebrew	English translation
עֲסִיק + אֲנָא ← עֲסִיקְנָא	אֲנִי עָסוּק	assiqna←assiq+ana	ani assuq	I am busy
עֲסִיק + אַתְּ ← עֲסִיקַתְּ	אַתָּה עָסוּק	assiqat← assiq+ata	ata assuq	you are busy
עֲסִיקִי + אֲנַן ← עֲסִיקִינַן	אָנוּ עֲסוּקִים	assiqinan←assiqi+anan	anu assuqim	we are busy
עֲסִיקִי + אַתּוּ ← עֲסִיקִיתּוּ	אַתֶּם עֲסוּקִים	assiqitu← assiqi+atu	atem assuqim	you (pl.) are busy

infinitive /gerund

Aramaic infinitive /gerund TO COME	Hebrew infinitive /gerund	Romanization of Aramaic	Romanization of Hebrew	English translation
(לְ)מֵיתֵי / לְמֵיתָא	(לָ)בוֹא	Lemeta/meteyi	la'vo	TO COME

Future tense

Aramaic verb WILL WRITE	Hebrew verb parallel WILL WRITE	Romanization of Aramaic	Romanization of Hebrew	English translation
אֲנָא אֶיכְתּוֹב	אֲנִי אֶכְתּוֹב	ana eikhtov	ani ekhtov	I will write
אַתְּ תִּיכְתּוֹב	אַתָּה תִּכְתּוֹב	at tikhtov	ata tikhtov	You (m.sing.)will write
אַתְּ תִּיכְתְּבִין	אַתְּ תִּיכְתְּבִי	at tikhtevin	at tikhtevi	You (f.sing.) will write
הוּא לִיכְתּוֹב	הוּא יִכְתּוֹב	hu likhtov	hu yikhtov	He will write
הִיא תִּיכְתּוֹב	הִיא תִּכְתּוֹב	hi tikhtov	hi tikhtov	She will write
אֲנָן לִיכְתּוֹב	אָנוּ נִכְתּוֹב	anan likhtov	anu nikhtov	We will write
אַתּוּ תִּיכְתְּבוּן	אַתֶּם תִּיכְתְּבוּ	atu tikhtevu	atem tikhtevun	you (m.pl.) will write
אינון לִיכְתְּבוּן	הם יכְתְּבוּ	innun likhtevun	hem yikhtevu	they (m.pl.) will write

==== Verbal pattern (binyan): Itpe'el (אִתְפְּעֵל) Basic Verb – Passive ====
past tense

Aramaic verb WAS/WERE WRITTEN	Hebrew verb parallel WAS/WERE WRITTEN	Romanization of Aramaic	Romanization of Hebrew	English translation
אֲנָא אִי(תְ)כְּתֵיבִית	אֲנִי נִכְתַבְתִּי	ana itk'tevit	ani nikhtavti	I was written
אַתְּ אִי(תְ)כְּתַבְתְּ	אַתָּה נִכְתַבְתָּה	at itk'tavt	ata nikhtavta	you (m.s.) were written
אַתְּ אִי(תְ)כְּתַבְתְּ	אַתְּ נִכְתַבְתְּ	at itk'tavt	at nikhtavt	you (f.s.) were written
הוּא אִי(תְ)כְּתֵיב	הוּא נִכְתַבְ	hu itk'tev	hu nikhtav	it (m.) was written
הִיא אִי(תְ)כַּתְבָה	הִיא נִכְתְּבָה	hi itkatva	hi nikhteva	it (f.) was written
אֲנָן אִי(תְ)כַּתְבִינָן	אָנוּ נִכְתַבְנוּ	anan itkatvinan	anu nikhtavnu	we were written
אַתּוּ אִי(תְ)כַּתְבִיתּוּ	אַתֶּם נִכְתַבְתֶּם	atu itkatvitu	atem nikhtavtem	you (m.pl.) were written
אינון אִי(תְ)כַּתְבוּ	הם נִכְתְּבוּ	innun itkatvu	hem nikhtevu	they (m.pl.) were written

future tense

Aramaic verb Will BE WRITTEN	Hebrew verb parallel Will BE WRITTEN	Romanization of Aramaic	Romanization of Hebrew	English translation
אֲנָא אֶ(תְ)כְּתֵיב	אֲנִי אֶכָּתֵיב	ana ekktev	ani ekkatev	I will be written
אַתְּ תִ(תְ)כְּתֵיב	אַתָּה תִכָּתֵיב	at tikktev	ata tikkatev	you (m.s.) will be written
אַתְּ תִ(תְ)כְּתֵיבִין	אַתְּ תִכָּתֵיבִי	at tikkatevin	at tikkatevi	you (f.s.) will be written
הוּא לִ(תְ)כְּתֵיב	הוּא יִכָּתֵיב	hu likktev	hu yikkatev	it (m.) will be written
הִיא תִ(תְ)כְּתֵיב	הִיא תִכָּתֵיב	hi tikktev	hi tikkatev	it (f.) will be written
אֲנָן לִ(תְ)כְּתֵיב	אָנוּ נִכָּתֵיב	anan likktev	anu nikkatev	we will be written
אַתּוּ תִ(תְ)כַּתְבוּ	אַתֶּם תִכָּתְבוּ	atu tikkat'vu	atem tikkatvu	you (m.pl.) will be written
אינון לִ(תְ)כְּתֵיבוּן	הם יִכָּתבוּ	innun likktevun	em ikkatvu	they (s.pl.) will be written
אינין לִ(תְ)כַּתְבָן	הן תִכָּתֵבְנָה	innin likkt'van	en tikkatevna	they (m.pl.) will be written

|}

==== Verbal pattern (binyan): pa‘el (פַּעֵל) Frequentative – Active ====
The verbal pattern (binyan) pa‘el are frequentative verbs showing repeated or intense action.

The verbal pattern pa'el is Active Frequentative.

past tense

Aramaic verb SANCTIFIED	Hebrew verb parallel SANCTIFIED	Romanization of Aramaic	Romanization of Hebrew	English translation
אֲנָא קַדֵּישִית	אֲנִי קִדַּשְתִּי	ana qadeshit	ani qiddashti	I sanctified
אַתְּ קַדֵּישְתְּ	אַתָּה קִדַּשְתָּ	at qadesht	ata qiddashta	You (m.s.) sanctified
אַתְּ קַדֵּישְתְּ	אַתְּ קִדַּשְתְּ	at qadesht	at qiddasht	You (f.s.) sanctified
הוּא קַדֵּיש	הוּא קִדֵּש	hu qaddesh	hu qiddesh	he sanctified
הִיא קַדִּישָה	הִיא קִדְּשָה	hi qaddisha	hi qiddsha	she sanctified
אֲנָן קַדֵּישְנָן	אָנוּ קִדַּשְנוּ	anan qaddeshnan	anu qiddashnu	we sanctified
אַתּוּ קַדֵּישְתּוּ	אַתֶּם קִדַּשְתֶּם	atu qaddeshtu	atem qiddashtem	You (m.pl.) sanctified
אינון קַדִּישוּ	הם קִדְּשוּ	innun qaddishu	hem qiddshu	they (m.pl.) sanctified

future tense

Aramaic verb WILL SANCTIFY	Hebrew verb parallel WILL SANCTIFY	Romanization of Aramaic	Romanization of Hebrew	English translation
אֲנָא אֲקַדֵּיש	אֲנִי אֲקַדֵּש	ana aqadesh	ani aqadesh	I will sanctify
אַתְּ תְקַדֵּיש	אַתָּה תְקַדֵּש	at teqadesh	ata teqadesh	You (m.s.) will sanctify
אַתְּ תְקַדְּשִי	אַתְּ תְקַדְּשִי	at teqadeshi	at teqadeshi	You (f.s.) will sanctify
הוּא יְקַדֵּיש	הוּא יְקַדֵּש	hu yeqadesh	hu yeqadesh	he will sanctify
הִיא תְקַדֵּיש	הִיא תְקַדֵּש	hi teqadesh	hi teqadesh	she will sanctify
אֲנָן לְקַדֵּיש	אָנוּ נְקַדֵּש	anan leqadesh	anu neqadesh	we will sanctify
אַתּוּ תְקַדְּשוּ	אַתֶּם תְקַדְּשוּ	atu teqadshu	atem teqadshu	You (m.pl.) will sanctify
אינון לְקַדְּשוּ	הם יְקַדְּשוּ	innun leqadshu	hem yeqadeshu	they (m.pl.) will sanctify
אינין לְקַדְּשָן	הן תְקַדֵּשְנָה	innin leqadshan	hen teqadeshna	they (f.pl.) will sanctify

==== Verbal pattern (binyan): Itpa'al (אִתְפַּעַל) Frequentative – Passive ====
The verbal pattern itpa'al is Passive Frequentative.

Aramaic verb WAS/WERE SANCTIFIED	Hebrew verb parallel WAS/WERE SANCTIFIED	Romanization of Aramaic	Romanization of Hebrew	English translation
אֲנָא יִ(תְ)קַדַּשִׁית	אֲנִי נִתְקַדַּשְׁתִּי	ana yiqqadashit	ani nitqadashti	I was sanctified
אַתְּ יִ(תְ)קַדַּשְׁתְּ	אַתָּה נִתְקַדַּשָׁה	at yiqqadasht	ata nitqqadasha	you (m.s.) were sanctified
אַתְּ יִ(תְ)קַדַּשְׁתְּ	אַתְּ נִתְקַדַּשְׁתְּ	at yiqqadasht	at nitqadasht	you (f.s.) were sanctified
הוּא יִ(תְ)קַדַּשׁ	הוּא נִתְקַדַּשׁ	hu yiqqadash	hu nitqadash	it (m.) was sanctified
הִיא יִ(תְ)קַדַּשָׁה	הִיא נִתְקַדַּשָׁה	hi yiqqadasha	hi nitqadasha	it (f.) was sanctified
אֲנָן יִ(תְ)קַדַּשִׁינָן	אָנוּ נִתְקַדַּשׁנוּ	anu yiqqadashinan	anu nitqadashnu	we were sanctified
אַתּוּ יִ(תְ)קַדַּשִׁיתּוּ	אַתֶּם נִתְקַדַּשְׁתֶּם	atu yiqqadashitu	innu nitqadashtem	they (f.) were sanctified
אִינון יִ(תְ)קַדַּשׁוּ	הם נִתְקַדַּשׁוּ	innun yiqqadashitu	hem nitqadashu	they (m.) were sanctified

Aramaic verb WILL BE SANCTIFIED	Hebrew verb parallel WILL BE SANCTIFIED	Romanization of Aramaic	Romanization of Hebrew	English translation
אֲנָא אֶ(תְ)קַדֵּשׁ	אֲנִי אֶתְקַדַּשׁ	ana eqqadash	ani etqadesh	I will be sanctified
אַתְּ תִ(תְ)קַדַּשׁ	אַתָּה תִתְקַדֵּשׁ	at tiqqadash	ata titqadesh	you (m.s.) will be sanctified
אַתְּ תִ(תְ)קַדְּשִׁין	אַתְּ תִתְקַדְּשִׁי	at tiqqadshin	at titqadshi	you (f.s.) will be sanctified
הוּא לִ(תְ)קַדַּשׁ	הוּא יִתְקַדֵּשׁ	hu liqqadash	hu yitqadesh	it (m.) will be sanctified
הִיא תִ(תְ)קַדַּשׁ	הִיא תִתְקַדֵּשׁ	hi tiqqadash	hi titqadesh	it (f.) will be sanctified
אֲנָן לִ(תְ)קַדַּשׁ	אָנוּ נִתְקַדֵּשׁ	anan liqqadash	anu nitqadesh	we will be sanctified
אַתּוּ תִ(תְ)קַדְּשׁוּ	אַתֶּם תִתְקַדְּשׁוּ	atu tiqqadshu	atem titqadshu	you (m.pl.) will be sanctified
אינון לִ(תְ)קַדְּשוּן	הם יִתְקַדְּשׁוּ	innun liqqadshun	hem yitqadshu	they (m.pl.) will be sanctified
אינין לִ(תְ)קַדְּשָׁן	הן תִתְקַדֵּשְׁנָה	innin liqqadshan	hen titqadeshna	they (f.pl.) will be sanctified

==== Verbal pattern (binyan): aph‘el (אַפְעֵל) Causative – Active ====
The verbal pattern aphel is Active Causative.

past tense

Aramaic verb DEPOSITED	Hebrew verb parallel DEPOSITED	Romanization of Aramaic	Romanization of Hebrew	English translation
אֲנָא אַפְקֵידִית	אֲנִי הִפְקַדְתִּי	ana afqedit	ani hifqaḏti	I deposited
אַתְּ אַפְקֵידְתְּ	אַתָּה הִפְקַדְתָּ	at afqedt	ata hifqaḏtta	you (m.s.) deposited
אַתְּ אַפְקֵידְתְּ	אַתְּ הִפְקַדְתְּ	at afqedt	at hifqaḏett	you (f.s.) deposited
הוּא אַפְקֵיד	הוּא הִפְקִיד	hu afqed	hu yifqid	he deposited
הִיא אַפְקִידָה	הִיא הִפְקִידָה	hi afqidah	hi yifqidah	she deposited
אֲנָן אַפְקְדִינָן	אָנוּ הִפְקַדְנוּ	anan afqedinan	anu hifqadnu	we deposited
אַתּוּ אַפְקְדִיתּוּ	אַתֶּם הִפְקַדְתֶּם	atu afqeditu	atem hifqaḏtem	you (m.pl.) deposited
אינון אַפְקִידוּ	הם הִפְקִידוּ	innun aphqidu	hem hifqidu	they (m.pl.) deposited

Aramaic verb BROUGHT	Hebrew verb parallel BROUGHT	Romanization of Aramaic	Romanization of Hebrew	English translation
אֲנָא אַיְיתֵית	אֲנִי הֵבֵאתִי	ana ajtet	ani heveti	I brought
אַתְּ אַיְיתֵיית	אַתָּה הֵבֵאתָ	at aytet	ata heveta	you (m.s.) brought
הוּא אַיְיתִי	הוּא הֵבִיא	hu ayti	hu hevi	he brought
הִיא אַיְיתָא הִיא אַתָיְא הִיא אַתָאי	הִיא הֵבִיאָה	hi ayta	hi heviya	she brought
אֲנָן אַיְיתֵינָא	אָנוּ הֵבֵאנוּ	anan aytena	anu hevenu	we brought
אינון אַיְיתוּ	הם הֵבִיאוּ	innun aytu	em hevi'u	they (m.pl.) brought

Participle

Aramaic active participle BRING with suffix	Hebrew active participle BRING	Romanization of Aramaic	Romanization of Hebrew	English translation
מַיְיתֵי / מַתְיָא + אֲנָא ← מַיְיתֵינָא	אֲנִי מֵבִיא	maitena ←maite+ana	ani mevi	I bring
מַיְיתֵי / מַתְיָא + אַתְּ ← מַיְיתֵיתְּ	אַתָּה מֵבִיא	maitet← maite+at	ata mevi	you bring
מַיְיתוּ / מַיְתָן + אֲנָן ← מַיְיתִינָן	אָנוּ מֵבִיאִים	maitinan←atu+maitu	anu mev'iim	we bring

Future tense

Aramaic verb WILL DEPOSITE	Hebrew verb parallel WILL DEPOSITE	Romanization of Aramaic	Romanization of Hebrew	English translation
אֲנָא אַפְקֵד	אֲנִי אַפְקִיד	ana afqed	ani afqid	I will deposite
אַתְּ תַפְקֵד	אַתָּה תַפְקִיד	at tafqed	ata tafqid	you (m.) will deposite
אַתְּ תַפְקְדִי	אַתְּ תַפְקִידִי	at tafqedi	at tafqidi	you (f.) will deposite
הוּא לַפְקֵד	הוּא יַפְקִיד	hu lafqed	hu yahqid	he will deposite
הִיא תַפְקֵד	הִיא תַפְקִיד	hi tafqed	hi tafqid	she will deposite
אֲנָן לַפְקֵד	אָנוּ נַפְקִיד	anan lafqed	anu nafqid	we will deposite
אַתּוּ תַפְקְדוּ	אַתֶּם תַפְקִידוּ	atu tafqedu	atem tafqidu	you (m.pl.) will deposite
אינון לַפְקְדוּ	הם יַפְקִידוּ	innun lafqedu	hem yafqidu	they (m.) will deposite

Aramaic verb WILL BRING	Hebrew verb parallel WILL BRING	Romanization of Aramaic	Romanization of Hebrew	English translation
אֲנָא אַיְיתֵי	אֲנִי אָבִיא	ana ayite	ani avi	I will bring
אַתְּ תַיְיתֵי	אַתָּה תָּבִיא	at tayite	ata tavi	you (m.) will bring
אַתְּ ?	אַתְּ תָּבִיאי	at ?	at tavi'i	you (f.) will bring
הוּא לַיְיתֵי	הוּא יָבִיא	hu layite	hu yavi	he will bring
הִיא תַיְיתֵי	הִיא תָּבִיא	hi tayite	hi tavi	she will bring
אֲנָן לַיְיתֵי	אָנוּ נָבִיא	anan layite	anu navi	we will bring
אַתּוּ תַיְתוּ	אַתֶּם תָּבִיאוּ	atu tayitu	atem tavi'u	you (m.pl.) will bring
אינון לַיְתוּ	הם יָבִיאוּ	innun layitu	em yavi'u	they (m.) will bring

==== Verbal pattern (binyan): itaphal (אִתַּפְעַל) Causative – Passive voice ====
The verbal pattern itaphal is Passive Causative.

Aramaic verb was refuted/were refuted	Hebrew verb parallel was refuted/were refuted	Romanization of Aramaic	Romanization of Hebrew	English translation
הוּא אִיתּוֹתַב	הוּא הוּשַׁב	hu ittothav	hu hushav	it (m.s.) was refuted
אינון אִיתּוֹתְבוּ	הם הוּשְׁבוּ	innun ittotvu	hem hushvu	they (m.pl.) were refuted

=== Noun: singular/plural ===
noun: singular
Jewish Babylonian Aramaic example	Hebrew parallel	English translation of the Jewish Babylonian Aramaic example
מַלְכָּא (malk-a)	המֶלֶךְ (ha-melekh)	the king
עָלְמָא (ʿalm-a)	העוֹלָם (ha-ʿolam)	the world
מְדִינְתָא (meḏin-ta)	המְדִינָה (ha-medina)	the state
מְנָא הָא מִילְּתָא דְּאָמְרִי אֱנָשֵׁי (mil-tha)	מִנַּיִין מִלָּה זֹאת שֶׁאוֹמְרִים אֲנָשִׁים (ha-mila)	the word/thing

noun: plural
Jewish Babylonian Aramaic example	Hebrew parallel	English translation of the Jewish Babylonian Aramaic example
מַלְכֵי (malkheji)/ מַלְכַיָּא (malkh-aya) are often used not only in the construct state but even in the absolute and emphatic states. Thus, in Babylonian Aramaic, the form מַלְכֵי may mean either the kings of or kings or the kings"	המְלָכִים (ha-melakhim)	the kings
עָלְמֵי (ʿalmeyi)/ עָלְמַיָּא (ʿalm-ayia)	העוֹלָמים (ha-olamim)	the worlds
מְנָא הָנֵי מִילֵּי (mil-eyi)	מִנַּיִין המִילִּים האֵלֶּה (ha-milim)	the words/things

=== List of verbs ===
Aramaic verb	Hebrew verb parallel	English translation
בע'	רָצָה	ask, request, want and require
חז'	רָאָה	see
עבד	עָשָׂה	do/make
פלג	חלק	divide
צרך	צריך	necessity
את'	בָּא	come
תנ'	שנה	teach, learn, state, recite and repeat
תוב	שוב	return
נפק	יָצָא	go out
נחת	יָרַד	go down
סלק	עָלָה	go up
ילף	למד	learn, teach
יתב	יָשַׁב	to sit
זבן	קָנָה/מָכַר	to buy/sell
הדר	חָזַר	to return
סלק	הוֹרִיד, הֵסִיר	to remove
גלי	גִּלָּה	to reveal
אסי	רִפֵּא	to heal, cure
הוי	הָיָה	he was
קום / קָאֵם	קם/עומד	to stand
עלל	בָּא אֶל	to enter

== Idiom ==
Idiom
Jewish Babylonian Aramaic example	Hebrew parallel	English translation of the Jewish Babylonian Aramaic example
קָאֵים (qa'em)	–	"rising, standing, referring to"
קָאֵים – קָא (qa)	–	–
מַאי קָא מַשְׁמַע לַן (mai qa mashma lan)	מָה מַשְׁמִיעַ לָנּוּ (ma mashma lanu)	"What new point is he teaching us "
מַאי קָאָמַר (mai qa'amar)	מָה הוּא אוֹמֵר (ma hu omer)	"What does he mean "
תָּנוּ רַבָּנָן (tanu rabanan)	שָׁנוּ חֲכָמִים (shanu khakhamim)	"the rabbis taught"
מְנָא הָנֵי מִילֵּי (mena hane mileji)	מִנַּיִין המִילִּים האֵלֶּה (minajin ha-milim ha-ele)	"What is the source"

== Modern study ==
The language has received considerable scholarly attention, as shown in the bibliography below. However, the majority of those who are familiar with it, namely Orthodox Jewish students of Talmud, are given no systematic instruction in the language, and are expected to "sink or swim" in the course of their Talmudic studies, with the help of some informal pointers showing similarities and differences with Hebrew.

== See also ==
- Jewish Palestinian Aramaic

== Bibliography ==
- Bar-Asher Siegal, Elitzur A. (2013). Introduction to the Grammar of Jewish Babylonian Aramaic. Münster: Ugarit. ISBN 978-3-86835-084-5.
- Epstein, J. N. (1960). Diqduq Aramit Bavlit [Grammar of Babylonian Aramaic] (in Hebrew).
- Frank, Yitzhak (2000). Grammar for Gemara: An Introduction to Babylonian Aramaic. Jerusalem: Ariel Institute. ISBN 0-87306-612-X.
- Frank, Yitzhak (2001). The Practical Talmud Dictionary. Jerusalem.
- Frank, Yitzhak (2011). Grammar for Gemara and targum onkelos: An Introduction to Aramaic. Jerusalem: Ariel Institute. ISBN 978-1-59826-466-1.
- Jastrow, Marcus. A Dictionary of the Targumim, the Talmud Babli and Yerushalmi, and the Midrashic Literature. ISBN 1-56563-860-3.
- Kara, Yehiel (1983). Babylonian Aramaic in the Yemenite Manuscripts of the Talmud: Orthography, Phonology and Morphology of the Verb. Jerusalem.
- Klein, Hyman (1943). An Introduction to the Aramaic of the Babylonian Talmud. London.
- Kutscher, Eduard Yechezkel (1977). Ben-Hayyim, Z.; Dotan, A.; Sarfatti, G. (eds.). Hebrew and Aramaic Studies. Jerusalem: The Magnes Press / The Hebrew University.
- Levias, Caspar (1900). A grammar of the Aramaic idiom contained in the Babylonian Talmud. (reprints available)
- Marcus, David. A Manual of Babylonian Jewish Aramaic. University Press of America. ISBN 0-8191-1363-8.
- Margolis, Max Leopold (1910). A manual of the Aramaic language of the Babylonian Talmud; grammar chrestomathy & glossaries. Munich. (reprints available)
- Melamed, Ezra Zion (2005). Dictionary of the Babylonian Talmud. Feldheim. ISBN 1-58330-776-1.
- Morag, Shelomo (1988). Babylonian Aramaic: The Yemenite Tradition – Historical Aspects and Transmission Phonology: the Verbal System (in Hebrew). Jerusalem: Ben Zvi Institute. ISBN 0-8018-7233-2.
- Morgenstern, Matthew (2011). Studies in Jewish Babylonian Aramaic Based Upon Early Eastern Manuscripts. Harvard Semitic Studies. ISBN 978-1-57506-938-8.
- Sokoloff, Michael (2003). A Dictionary of Jewish Babylonian Aramaic of the Talmudic and Geonic Periods. Bar Ilan and Johns Hopkins University Press. ISBN 0-8018-7233-2.
- Luzzatto, Samuel David; Krüger, Marcus Salomon (1873). Grammatik der biblisch-chaldäischen Sprache und des Idioms des Thalmud Babli: ein Grundriss (in German). Breslau: Schletter.
