= Shabbat (Talmud) =

Talmudic tractate about the Jewish Sabbath

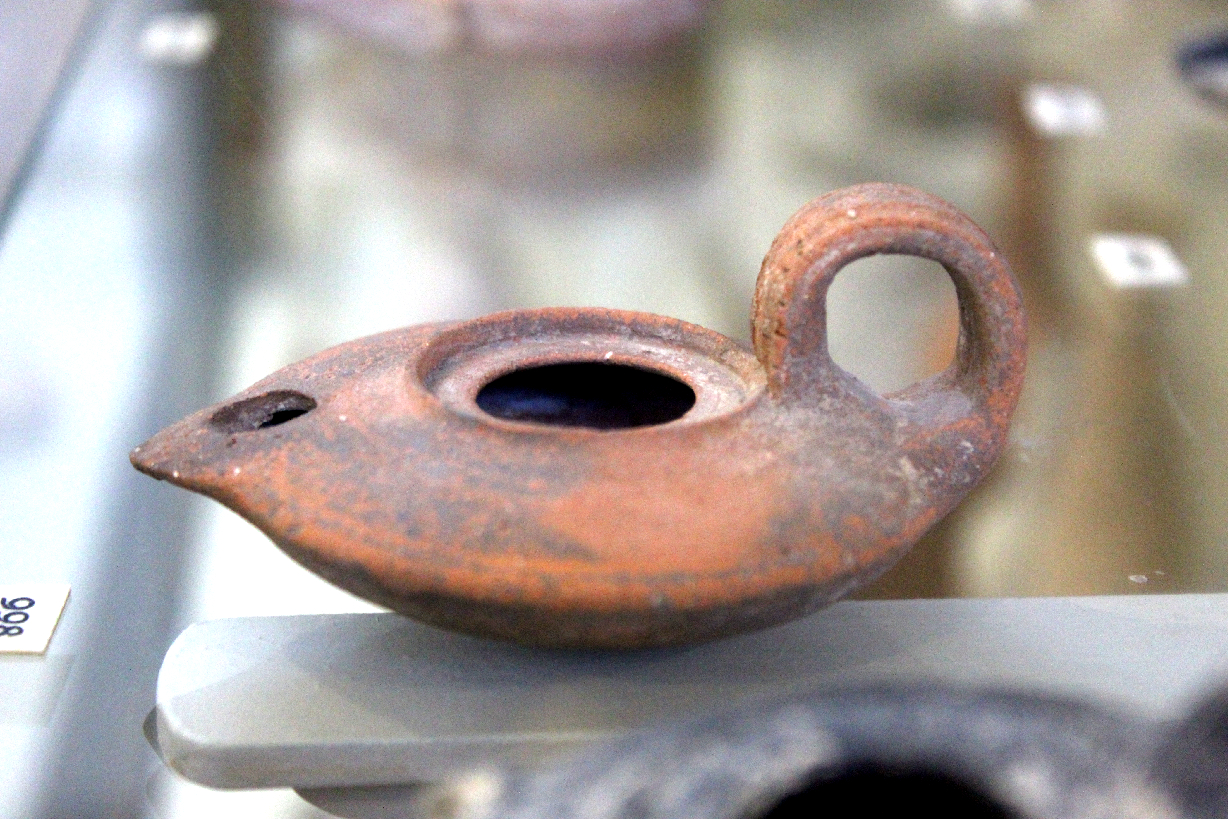
- Ancient terracotta oil lamp, as used for Sabbath lights

Tractate of the Talmud
- English: Shabbat
- Seder: Moed
- Number of mishnahs: 138
- Chapters: 24
- Babylonian Talmud pages: 157
- Jerusalem Talmud pages: 92
- Tosefta chapters: 18

Shabbat (Hebrew: שַׁבָּת, lit. 'Sabbath') is the first tractate of Seder Moed ('Order [of] Appointed Times') of the Mishnah and of the Talmud. The tractate deals with the laws of observance of and practices regarding Shabbat, the biblical Sabbath in Judaism. The tractate focuses primarily on the categories and types of activities prohibited on the Sabbath according to interpretations of many verses in the Torah, notably Exodus 20:9–10 and Deuteronomy 5:13–14.

The Mishnah and Talmud go to great lengths to carefully define and precisely determine the observance of the Sabbath. The tractate is thus one of the longest in terms of chapters in the Mishnah and folio pages in the Talmud. It comprises 24 chapters and has a Gemara—rabbinical analysis of and commentary on the Mishnah—in both the Babylonian Talmud and all but the last four chapters of the Jerusalem Talmud. There is also a Tosefta of 18 chapters on this tractate.

As its name suggests, the tractate primarily addresses the laws and regulations governing the observance of the Jewish Sabbath. It is enumerated as the fourth commandment among the Ten Commandments and constitutes a central element of Rabbinic Judaism and Jewish law (הֲלָכָה, Halakha; pl. הֲלָכוֹת, halakhot). Consequently, this subject is extensively discussed in the Mishnah and the Gemara, and numerous subsequent commentaries have been authored on this tractate from the early Middle Ages to the present. In the Babylonian Talmud, the Gemara also contains a discussion of the laws of Hanukkah. The halakhot detailed in tractate Shabbat, and the subsequent legal codes based on it, continue to be followed by observant Jewish communities in modern Israel and the Jewish diaspora.

== Subject matter ==
Six days you shall labor and do all your work; but on the seventh day, which is a Sabbath in honor of the LORD your God, you shall not do any work, neither you, nor your son, nor your daughter, nor your male or female servant, nor your cattle, nor the stranger who is within your gates.

— Exodus 20:7–10, the Fourth Commandment, a key source for the subject matter of tractate Shabbat

This tractate primarily covers the laws of observing Shabbat, the weekly day of rest. It provides comprehensive explanations of the types of activities prohibited on Shabbat, the sources in the Torah for these prohibitions, the details of the laws, and the rabbinic rulings connected with them. It also deals with matters concerning other mitzvot (Biblical Hebrew: מִצְוֹת, lit. 'commandments') that apply on Shabbat. In addition, the main discussion about the laws of Hanukkah are included in the Babylonian Talmud.

The Sabbath is one of the most important religious practices of normative Judaism, and the Mishnah and Talmud go to great lengths to carefully define and precisely determine how it is to be observed. This concern reflected its importance in the biblical sources, where there are more reminders of Sabbath observance than of any other matter, with the possible exception of the prohibitions against idolatry.

Biblical passages concerning the topics discussed in this tractate include the foundational concept of the Sabbath recounted in Genesis 2:2–3, the two iterations of the Fourth Commandment prohibiting creative work recorded in Exodus 20:7–10 and Deuteronomy 5:12–14, respectively, and other actions, such as desisting from weekday pursuits (Isaiah 58:13–14) and carrying loads associated with working (Jeremiah 17:21–22), among others.

=== Halakha ===
Jewish law (Halakha) relating to Shabbat and the activities prohibited on Shabbat in particular, are the primary subject matter of the tractate. Prohibited actions derived from the Torah, and rabbinic rulings designed to safeguard or enhance the practices of the cessation of labor and Sabbath rest, are as follows:

- Activities prohibited on Shabbat (מְלָאכָה, Melakha): Thirty-nine forms of "creative work" with their derivatives that are forbidden on the Sabbath are defined by the Mishnah (Shabbat 7:2). They are called avot melakhot (אֲבוֹת מְלָאכוֹת, 'fathers [or principals] [of] works') and are specified or implied from the work required to make the Tabernacle in the desert, which is described immediately following the commandment to observe the Sabbath in the Torah. Other actions that derive from these principal categories, called toladot (תּוֹלָדוֹת, 'descendants'), which could lead to performing one of the avot melakhot, were added to the prohibition.
- Rabbinically prohibited activities of Shabbat (שְׁבוּת, Shevut, 'cessation'): referring to "rest" from acts that are not within the definition of melakha but are considered to be inconsistent with the sanctity of the Sabbath and were thus prohibited so as to honor the Sabbath and prevent the violation of Torah prohibitions or to enhance the sanctity of the day by refraining from weekday pursuits, such as business, in accordance with the biblical mandates to transform the day into "a Shabbat of solemn rest, holy to the LORD" (Exodus 31:15) and to "call the Shabbat a delight, and the holy of the LORD honorable; and you shall honor it, not doing your usual ways, nor, pursuing your business, nor speaking thereof" (Isaiah 58:13–14).
- Muktzeh (מוּקְצֶה, 'set apart'): referring to certain items and articles that are "set apart" and prohibited from being lifted or handled on the Sabbath, even though no work was involved; several categories of muktzeh are specified in this tractate, including items whose purpose was specifically for, or could be used for an activity that was not permitted on the Sabbath, items that had not specifically been set aside for use on the Sabbath, or items that had not been available before the Sabbath began.
- Hotzaah (הוֹצָאָה, 'taking out'): the transfer of an article of significant size from a private domain to a public domain, or vice versa, and carrying an object four cubits in a public domain is forbidden by the Torah; large portion of this tractate, and the following tractate, Eruvin, are devoted to a detailed analysis of laws of carrying on the Sabbath, between four defined domains: private, public, semi-public and an exempt area, including both biblical and rabbinical prohibitions.
- Techum shabbat (Hebrew: תְּחוּם שַׁבָּת, lit. 'Shabbat boundary'): the prohibition on traveling a certain distance outside one's dwelling place (or the edge of one's city, if in a city).

=== Aggada ===
In addition to the legal discussions and analysis of the Mishnah, the Gemara in this tractate contains a considerable amount of Aggadah, including narratives and historical stories, as well as moral tales, exegetical interpretations, and sayings.

A significant narrative section describes the origin of Hanukkah, relating that when the Hasmoneans defeated the Seleucid overlords and purified the Temple in Jerusalem, they found only one small jar of pure oil sealed with the High Priest of Israel's seal and apparently sufficient for a single day only; but by a miracle it lasted for eight days, so that the festival of Hanukkah is celebrated for eight days.

Other narratives describe how Chazal considered excluding the books of Ezekiel, Ecclesiastes and Proverbs from the canon of the Hebrew Bible; however, once interpretations and explanations for the passages that appear contradictory were provided, decided that they should be included.

Also discussed is Rabbi Simeon bar Yohai, who was forced to flee and lived in a cave for twelve years following his criticism of the Roman conquerors and rulers of the Land of Israel.

The gentleness of the sage Hillel the Elder contrasted with the severity of Shammai is illustrated by several examples. Among the sayings and ethical teachings are Hillel's famous distillation of Judaism, "What is hateful to you, do not do to your neighbor" (Shabbat 31a:6). Other aggadic sayings cited include "'Truth' is the seal of God" (Shabbat 55a:12) and, per Eliezer ben Hurcanus, "Repent one day before your death" (Shabbat 153a:5)—meaning always be ready to appear before God, an idea also illustrated by a parable of wise and foolish people invited to a royal feast.

The Torah is extolled in an aggadic passage (Shabbat 88a:6) which says that God specified that the world would return to primordial chaos unless the people of Israel accepted the Torah, that Israel accepted it joyfully and Moses fought to obtain it, in appreciation of an understanding that God's kingdom on earth can be established only after struggle. The Gemara also elucidates that antisemitism and anti-Judaism are a religious animosity dating from the time when the revelation at Sinai gave the people of Israel a faith which differentiated them from other nations.

In relation to the Sabbath, the primary theme of this tractate, an aggadah relates that the Sages found the spiritual significance of the Sabbath in the desire to be in harmony with God, as the core and essence of Judaism. Also recounted is the tradition that two angels accompany religious Jews home from the synagogue on Friday evening after the Kabbalat Shabbat service.

== Structure and content ==
The tractate consists of 24 chapters and 138 paragraphs (mishnayot) and has a Gemara—rabbinical analysis of and commentary on the Mishnah—in both the Babylonian Talmud and all but the last four chapters of the Jerusalem Talmud. There is also a Tosefta of 18 chapters for this tractate.

In standard printed editions of the Babylonian Talmud, the Gemara contains 157 folio (double-sided) pages and is the longest tractate by page count after tractate Bava Batra, which has 176 folio pages. There are 92 folio pages of Gemara in the Jerusalem Talmud.

In the Jerusalem Talmud, the Gemara for the last four chapters of the Mishnah no longer exists. Handwritten manuscripts of these four chapters likely existed before the age of printing but that all the copies were destroyed in periodic acts of antisemitic violence, as well as by acts of deliberate destruction and suppression of the Talmud, such as at the Disputation of Paris.

The mishnayot in the tractate are arranged in a sequential order, apart from the first one, which addresses the topic of carrying loads on Shabbat, but which can, however, be relevant right at the beginning of Shabbat. The tractate then continues to discuss what may not be done on Friday afternoon and proceeds to topics relevant to actions and preparations immediately before Shabbat.

The tractate then deals with lighting Shabbat candles, discussing the oils and wicks that may be used for Shabbat lights; it goes on to discuss matters concerning Sabbath food preparation such as which food may be stored for Shabbat, and keeping food hot for the Shabbat meals by leaving it on top of a stove from before Shabbat and insulating hot food before the beginning of Shabbat; and then continues to discuss the laws of carrying loads on Shabbat—mentioned first at the beginning of the tractate—for transferring things from one domain to another—a concept known as hotzaah.

The Mishnah then lists the 39 Melakhot, or activities prohibited from performing on Shabbat as proscribed by the Torah; these are discussed in detail in the subsequent chapters. Then, the tractate covers several subjects, including those actions that are rabbinical injunctions, such as shevut—rabbinically prohibited activities of Shabbat—and mutzkeh, or objects forbidden from use on Shabbat. The tractate concludes with laws applicable at the end of Shabbat, such as walking to the furthest extent of the techum Shabbat (lit. 'Shabbat border') to get an early start on a journey, and the laws of taking care of animals on Shabbat.

An overview of the chapters is as follows:

- Chapter 1 deals with the issue of "domains", including ways in which things may not be brought from a private domain to the public domain and vice versa on Shabbat, and with questions concerning what may or may not be done on Erev Shabbat, or the part of Friday before sunset, when Shabbat begins.
- Chapter 2 deals with the lighting of Shabbat lights, the kinds of oil which may be used, and the materials which may serve as wicks, along with further details concerning lamps, cases in which lamps may be extinguished on Shabbat, actions that typically women must do, and tasks that the head of the household—male or female—needs to remind household members to do before Shabbat begins.
- Chapter 3 examines permitted and prohibited methods of keeping food warm or warming food up on Shabbat, and things which are regarded as set apart (i.e., mutzkeh) and which one is forbidden to move on that day.
- Chapter 4 continues the discussion of topics from Chapter 3.
- Chapter 5 addresses the commandment to allow domestic animals to rest on Shabbat, and examines details such as with what an animal may be led on Shabbat, such as a bridle, and what is regarded permissible to place on it, such as a blanket, and what is considered a burden that is forbidden to load on an animal on that day if it is not required for the health or safety of the animal, or for guarding it.
- Chapter 6 discusses what one may wear a part of one's clothing, and what may not be worn; a discussion of whether weapons may be considered a permissible adornment; the majority of Chazal, the sages of the Talmud, deciding that weapons disgrace the person who bears them, since they are instruments of murder, and the ideal of the future is a time when the nations will live in everlasting harmony and exchange their weapons for implements of peace, as envisioned in Isaiah 2:4 of the Tanakh.
- Chapter 7 lists the 39 principal categories of activity forbidden on Shabbat (i.e., melakhot), seven related to agriculture, four to the preparation of food, thirteen to clothes making, seven to butchering and tanning, two to writing and erasing, two to building and demolishing, two to lighting and extinguishing fires, one to giving the finishing touch to something, and one to carrying an object from the public to the private domain and vice versa; it and also discusses the sin offering to be sacrificed in the Temple in Jerusalem for the inadvertent violation of Shabbat and the minimal quantities which incur the obligation to do so.
- Chapter 8 continues examining the question of the quantity of various objects which, if they are carried, violate Shabbat, and citing Isaiah 30:14.
- Chapter 9 begins the definitions of various melakhot, citing additional biblical verses as proofs or texts, and provides further details concerning the quantities of many items that may not be carried on Shabbat.
- Chapter 10 examines the cases in which someone who transports an object is not violating Shabbat, cases in which two people who carry an object together from one place to another are or are not violating Shabbat, transporting a corpse or a living person, and the questions of whether it is permissible to bite or cut ones nails or remove hair on Shabbat.
- Chapter 11 examines the melakhot related to throwing objects from one place to another, from one house across the street to another, from the land into the water and vice versa, or from a ship to the sea and vice versa.
- Chapter 12 examines the melakhot of building, hammering, sawing, boring, weeding fields, chopping trees, and gathering wood or plants; writing two letters of the alphabet and of writing in general, together with cases in which writing does not violate Shabbat.
- Chapter 13 examines the melakhot of weaving, spinning, sewing, tearing, washing, dyeing, and hunting.
- Chapter 14 considers cases in which hunting on Shabbat is permissible, the preparation of a salt solution, and which medicines and remedies are permitted on Shabbat and which are forbidden.
- Chapter 15 discusses which types of knots may be tied on Shabbat and which may not; and putting clothes away and making beds.
- Chapter 16 mainly discusses the problems arising from a fire which breaks out on Shabbat, rescuing sacred writings and tefillin (a.k.a. phylacteries), as well as food that is necessary for that day; permitting non-Jews, but not Jews, to extinguish the fire; and prohibiting a Jew from requesting a non-Jew to do work for them on Shabbat.
- Chapter 17 deals with the topic of mutzkeh, particularly containers which may be carried on Shabbat, and lowering blinds.
- Chapter 18 examines things which may be moved on Shabbat, leading calves and foals, leading but not carrying a child, helping cattle when about to give birth, and assisting a woman in labor.
- Chapter 19 deals with the issue of circumcision, and the necessary preparations for it on Shabbat.
- Chapter 20 begins an exploration of miscellaneous questions relating to Shabbat, starting with how wine may be strained and cattle fed on Shabbat.
- Chapter 21 examines whether and how objects, regarded as mutzkeh, may be moved and put away, and the clearing of the table.
- Chapter 22 considers the preparation of food and drink on Shabbat, and bathing and anointing with oil on that day.
- Chapter 23 examines lending, raffling, and distributing food and drink on Shabbat, preparations for the evening of the weekday which may be made on Shabbat, and caring for the dead on Shabbat.
- Chapter 24 discusses the case of a traveler overtaken by Shabbat eve before he reaches a city, the feeding of cattle, and the fulfillment of vows on Shabbat.

== Historical context and influence ==
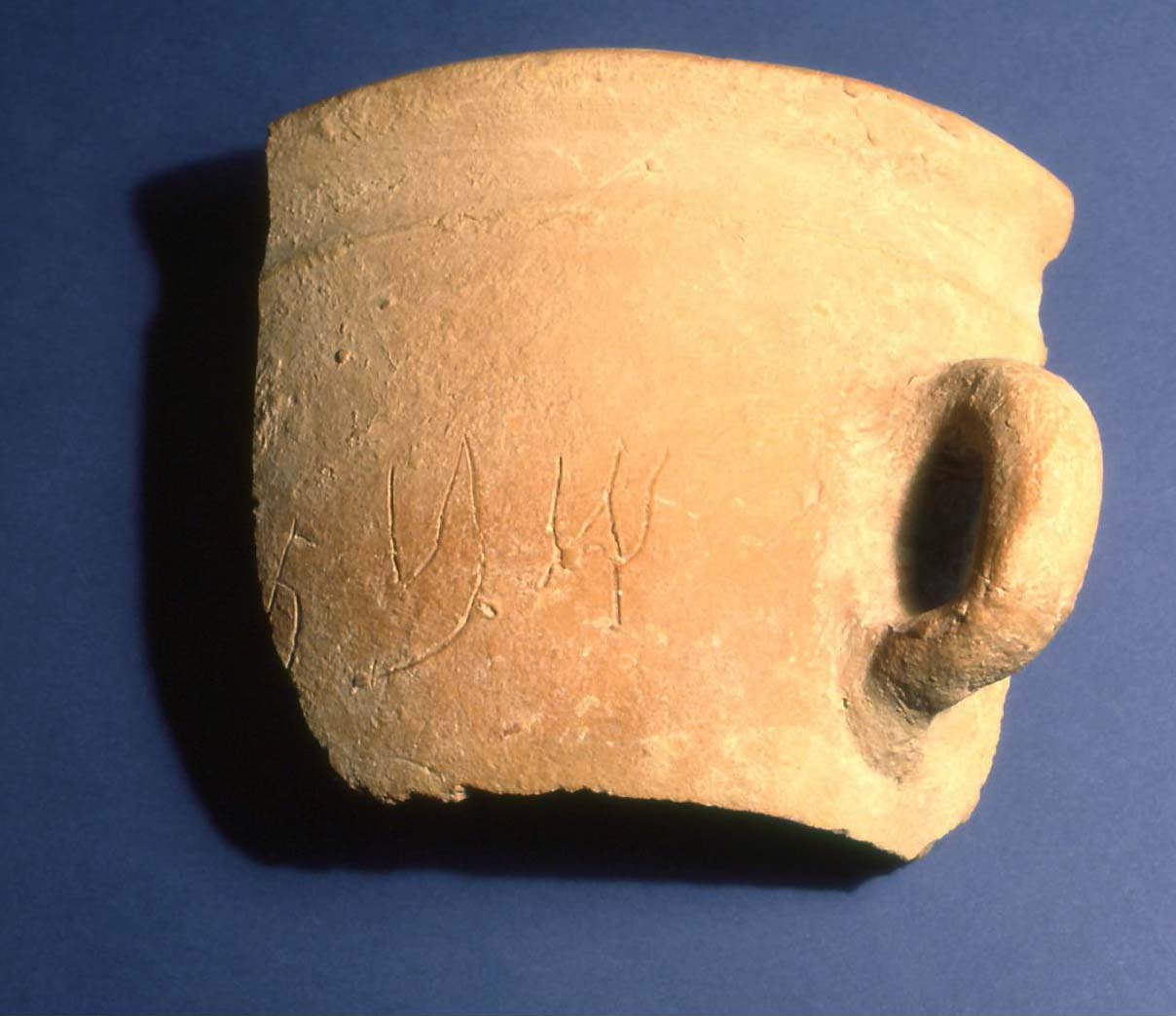
Fragment of a stand for a Sabbath lamp on which the word "Shabbat" is engraved (Horbat 'Uza layer 8, c. 340–410 CE, northern Israel).

The Mishnah was compiled towards the end of the Mishnaic period (c. 30 BCE–200 CE) in the Roman province of Judaea and forms an early part in the lengthy development of Jewish law regarding Sabbath observance. Joshua ben Levi is mentioned in Shabbat 104a:4, dating some portions to the early 3rd century. The categories of work defined in the Mishnah were appropriate for ancient Israel's largely rural society, whose economic base was farming. As Jewish society evolved in the Land of Israel, and then also in the Roman and Persian Empires, particularly Babylonia, the Gemara and subsequent legal literature elaborated on the basic foundations and principles laid out in the Mishnah to address new and different circumstances than those originally encountered in the time of the Mishnah.

As one of the distinguishing features of Jewish society from ancient times, the Talmud views Shabbat observance as an institution upholding basic teachings of Judaism—belief in God’s acts of creation ex nihilo, God's role in Jewish history, and God's covenant with Israel—and after the loss of Jewish sovereignty and the destruction of the Temple by the Romans in the first century CE, as a bulwark for the preservation of the Jewish people.

The Mishnah and the Gemara—with some elaboration—define the rituals that have continued to be observed by traditional Jewish communities: to both "remember" (זָכוֹר, zakhor) and "keep" (שָׁמוֹר, shamor) the Sabbath and to sanctify it at home and in the synagogue. In addition to refraining from creative work, the sanctification of the day through Kiddush (blessings recited over wine), the preparation of special Shabbat meals, and engaging in prayer and Torah study were required for proper, active Shabbat observance, the intent of which was to promote intellectual activity and spiritual regeneration on the day of rest. Chazal, the sages of the Rabbinic period (c. 70 – c. 638 CE), taught that the "best food" should be prepared for Shabbat, for, as Rabbi Yehudah—in the name of Abba Arikha (a.k.a. Rav)—taught: "One who delights in the Sabbath is granted their heart's desires" (Shabbat 118b:2). The emphasis on Shabbat being a day of eating and drinking was meant, according to some scholars, to counteract the ascetic tendencies of the Essenes.

Among traditional Jewish communities and in the modern State of Israel, where Shabbat is an official day of rest, contemporary responsa, based on the application of the principles of the Mishnah—as it was interpreted in tbr Gemara and subsequently expounded upon by halakhic authorities known as poskim (פּוֹסְקִים, 'judges'; sg. פּוֹסֵק, posek)—focus mostly on technological advances in terms of the correct practice according to Jewish law. Examples of these issues include a wide variety of subjects, such as use of electricity on Shabbat; how crossing the International Date Line affects the observance of Sabbaths and festivals; the use of elevators; and medical questions ranging from whether hearing aids may be worn on the Sabbath to driving on Shabbat for an emergency.

== Commentaries ==
=== Rishonim ===
A primary commentator on this tractate are Rabbi Shlomo Yitzchaki, typically known as Rashi (1040–1105), who was the author of a comprehensive commentary on the Talmud and was referenced extensively by the Tosafists, the latter of whom collected "additional" commentaries—the Tosafot—of numerous rabbis from the 12th to the mid-15th centuries in France and Germany.

Maimonides's commentary on the Mishnah, the Mishneh Torah, composed c. 1158 – c. 1168, provides a running commentary on the entire Mishnah and often includes halakhic rulings based on the Talmud's decisions.

Commentaries of other early Rishonim include the following:

- Tosafot Yeshanim, which appear as comments in the margins of the Vilna Edition Shas of the Talmud on almost every page until the end of the third chapter of Shabbat (47b). The commentary becomes less frequent thereafter and ends on page 61b. The style indicates that the Tosafot Yeshanim are short excerpts from a larger and more complete work and were apparently included whenever they were relevant to the words of the Tosafot. Occasionally, they are inserted in the middle of the Tosafot, in a smaller font to set them apart.
- Rabbeinu Nissim Gaon (990–1062) of Kairouan in North Africa, whose commentary, printed in the margins of the Vilna Talmud edition, provides background information when the Gemara refers to a concept dealt with elsewhere in the Talmud. Additionally, in his work Sefer ha'Mafte'ach, he quotes and discusses the sources of the Gemara's citations, and his Megilat Setarim provides some halakhic notes on the tractate.
- Rabenu Chananel (990–1053), also of Kairouan, whose commentary on the Gemara appears in the margins of the Vilna edition of the Talmud.
- Rabbeinu Tam (1100–1171), of Troyes, France, wrote chidushim on tractate Shabbat that appear in his book Sefer haYashar.

Sefer ha'Mafte'ach, Megilat Setarim, and the commentary of Rabbi Chananel ben Chushiel were reprinted from manuscripts, with footnotes by Rabbi David Metzger, in Jerusalem in 1990. Sefer haYashar was reprinted in 1980 in Jerusalem, based on two original manuscripts, with footnotes by Rabbi Shimon Schlesinger.

Commentaries of Rishonim who lived in the medieval kingdoms of Aragon, Provence and Narvona include the following:

- Rabbi Jonathan ben David ha-Kohen of Lunel (c. 1135 – c. 1210) wrote a commentary on Rabbi Isaac Alfasi's commentary on most of the Talmud, including tractate Shabbat.
- Sefer ha'Hashlamah by Rabbeinu Meshulam ben Moshe (c. 1175–1238), which adds the halakhot that were not discussed in the commentary of the Rif.
- Rabbeinu Moshe ben Nachman (Ramban; 1194–1270) wrote chidushim on Shabbat, as well as the work Milchamot Hashem; his commentary was published with corrections and brief annotations by Rabbi Isser Zalman Meltzer in 1928 and was reprinted from manuscripts, along with corrections and clarifications, by Rabbi Moshe Herschler in 1973.
- Rabbeinu Judah ben Benjamin Anav, the Rivevan (c. 1215–1280), one of the leading sages of Italy, wrote a commentary to the Rif for many tractates, including Shabbat; he often uses the words of Rashi, without quoting him by name, making his work an excellent source for verifying the correct version in Rashi.
- Beit ha'Bechirah by Menachem Meiri (1249–1315), the Meiri, is a comprehensive halakhic work on 37 tractates of the Talmud, including Shabbat.
- Sefer ha'Me'orot, by Rabbeinu Meir ben Shimon (d. 1264), is a commentary on the Rif.
- Sefer ha'Michtam by Rabbeinu David ben Levi of Narbonne (13th century).
- Rabbeinu Shlomo ben Avraham ibn Aderet, the Rashba (1235–1310), wrote a commentary on Shabbat that was first printed in its entirety in 1938 and reprinted based on manuscripts, along with corrections and clarifications, by Mossad Harav Kook in Jerusalem, in 1986.
- Rabbeinu Yom Tov ben Abraham Ishbili, the Ritva (1260–1320), Chidushei ha'Ritva Al ha'Shas, which was mistakenly replaced by the text of the Chidushei ha'Ran in many printed editions from 1806 until recent times; the actual manuscript was published in part, with notes and annotations, in 1967, and later in its entirety, by Mossad Harav Kook, with annotations by Rabbi Moshe Goldstein in Jerusalem in 1990.
- Rabbeinu Nissim of Gerona, the Ran (1320–1376), authored chidushim to tractate Shabbat that were originally published under the name Chidushei ha'Ritva in 1806. When the authentic Chidushei ha'Ritva were printed from the manuscript in 1967, the Ran's chidushim were reprinted under his correct name.

Commentaries of Rishonim who lived in medieval France, Germany, and other locations include the following:

- The Ra'avan by Rabbeinu Eliezer ben Nathan (1090–1170), among the earliest of the Tosafists.
- Sefer ha'Ner by Rabbi Zechariah Aghmati (1120-1195), a contemporary of the Rambam in Morocco, whose commentary on the tractate often quotes from earlier authorities, Rav Sherira Gaon and Rav Hai Gaon, and from Rabenu Chananel.
- Avi ha'Ezri, more commonly known as Sefer ha'Ra'avyah, by Rabbeinu Eliezer ben Joel HaLevi (1140-1255), one of the Tosafists.
- Rabbeinu Isaiah di Trani (c. 1180 – c. 1250), whose commentary on most of the tractates of the Talmud is known as Tosfot Rid, and his halakhic summary of the tractate is called Piskei Rid; his manuscripts were printed in Israel in 1992.
- Or Zarua by Rabbi Isaac ben Moses of Vienna (c. 1200–1270); the Or Zarua usually cites the relevant Gemara and Rashi for each halakha, making it a resource for establishing the correct version in Rashi.
- Piskei Ri'az by the grandson of the Rid, Rabbeinu Isaiah di Trani the Younger, which is printed with the Piskei Rid.

• Tosfot ha'Rosh of Rabbeinu Asher ben Jehiel(c. 1250–1327), wrote commentaries and rulings on most of the Talmud, which had a profound influence on the codification of Jewish law; his Tosfot often clarifies the intentions of the earlier Tosafists.

=== Acharonim ===
There are many commentaries by the Acharonim on the tractate Shabbat. Some of the classic works include the following:

- Bartenura by Rabbi Obadiah of Bertinoro (c. 1445 – c. 1515), a commentary printed in almost every edition of the Mishnah since it was first published in Venice in 1548, mainly based on discussions in the Gemara and on the Rambam's commentary, and including a summary of the Talmudic discussions along with the accepted halakhic opinions.
- Gur Aryeh by Rabbi Judah Loew ben Bezalel, the "Maharal of Prague" (d. 1609), analyzing and explaining the aggadah and some halakhic issues of the tractate.
- Pene Yehoshua by Rabbi Joshua Falk of Kraków (1555–1614), a basic commentary on the Gemara and the commentary of Rashi and the Tosafot, and once a widely used basic text for yeshiva students.
- Chasam Sofer, a commentary on this tractate, and part of the larger commentary on the Talmud, by Rabbi Moses Sofer of Frankfurt (1762–1839).
- Yachin uBoaz, by Rabbi Israel Lipschitz (1782–1860), a commentary divided into two sections:
  - Yachin—the plain meaning of the text.
  - Boaz—lengthier analytical insights, with each chapter also having a subsection called Hilchata Gevirta ('halakhic synopsis') containing a halakhic summary of each mishnah.
- Melechet Shlomo written by Rabbi Shlomo Adeni (1567–1625) in Hebron, it remained a manuscript until it was first published in Vilna in the 1880s.
- Tosafot Yom Tov on Mishnah Shabbat and Ikar Tosafot Yom Tov, an abridged version of Tosafot Yom Tov, by Rabbi Yom-Tov Lipmann Heller (1579–1654).
- Kikayon d'Yonah by Rabbi Jonah Teomim-Frankel (1595–1669), with short insights on the Gemara and the commentary of Rashi and the Tosafot for chapter one and from chapter seven onward. First printed in Amsterdam in 1690 and reprinted in 1959 by the Yeshiva of Nitra in New York.
- Tziyun le-Nefesh Chayah (often abbreviated to Tzelach), by Rabbi Yechezkel Landau of Prague (1713–1793).
- Chidushei u'Biurei Ha'Gra l'Maseches Shabbos, novellae and explanations of the Vilna Gaon (1720–1797) on tractate Shabbat, comprising the original Chidushei ha'Gra on Shabbat, his writings in Shenos Eliyahu on the Mishnah, and his commentary, the Biurei ha'Gra, on the Shulchan Aruch, compiled by Rabbi Avraham Droshkovitz.
- Chidushei Rabbi Akiva Eger, a collection of writings on the tractate by Rabbi Akiva Eger (1761–1837) and Tosafot Rabbi Akiva Eiger, published in Vilna (1908/1909).
- Sefas Emes, short insights on some of the tractate's topics by Rabbi Yehudah Aryeh Leib Alter, the second Gerrer Rebbe (1847–1905).

Anthologies on the tractate include the following:

- Gilyonei Ha'shas by Rabbi Yosef Engel, a collection mainly of references to—and quotes from—the Rishonim's responsa and other earlier works, with additional insights by the author.
- Asifat Zekenim he'Chadash, a collection of rare works on some of the chapters of the tractate.
- Mesilot ha'Barzel by Rabbi Nisan Shabsai Hailper, listing sources in the Rishonim and Acharonim that deal with issues in the Gemara.
- Al Masechet Shabbat, a two-volume collection of works on the tractate, such as Ishei Yisrael and Etz ha'Da'at Tov.

Halakhic discussions of the issues of the tractate include the following:

- Rosh Yosef by Rabbi Yosef Tumim, author of the Pri Megadim.
- Chefetz Hashem by Rabbi Chaim ibn Attar, the Or ha'Chayim ha'Kadosh.

Works focused particularly on the 39 categories of activity prohibited on Shabbat include the following:

- Tal Orot (ha'Kadmon) by Rabbi Shaul ben David, printed in Prague in 1614 and reprinted in Jerusalem in 1996.
- Tal Orot (ha'Sephardi) by Rabbi Yosef ben Joya, published in Salonika in 1790 and reprinted in Jerusalem in 1987.
- Magen Avot by Rabbi Mordechai Bennett, regarding the melakhot on both Shabbat and festivals.
- Minchat Chinuch, which contains a section discussing the 39 melakhot of Shabbat in the discussion of the mitzvah of observing Shabbat.
- Kalkelles ha'Shabbat, a discussion of the 39 melakhot by Israel Lipschitz, in the first volume of his commentary on Seder Moed.
- Iglei Tal by Rabbi Avraham Borenstein, on the first eleven of the 39 melakhot, called the sidura d'pas ("order of making bread), and the twelfth category, gozez ("shearing").
- Yesodei Yeshurun by Rabbi Gedalia Felder of Toronto, originally printed with his responsa and later printed separately in Jerusalem in 1976, discussing all 39 melakhot and including understandings of the Rishonim and Acharonim and his own insights.
- Ne'im Zemiros, by the author of the Mirkeves ha'Mishnah, a poem with brief mentions of the Rambam's laws of the various categories of activities, and a commentary on this poem, clarifying their meaning.

== Liturgical uses ==
The morning service in both the Ashkenazi and Sefardi liturgy begins with recital of blessings over the Torah, followed by brief selections from the Hebrew Bible, Mishna and Gemara, in accordance with a statement in the Talmud (Kiddushin 30a) that Torah learning comprises these three elements. The biblical text are the three verses of the Priestly Blessing, the Mishna is from tractate Peah, about commandments that have no fixed measures, including the mitzvah of Peah, and of learning Torah), and the passage from the Gemara is from this tractate, BT Shabbat 127a, about the reward for good deeds in this world and the next.

The second chapter of the Mishna of this tractate, called Ba'meh Madlikin ("With what may we light?"), is recited during the Kabbalat Shabbat service on Friday evenings in both the Ashkenazi and Sefardi liturgies. The recitation of this chapter referenced the disagreement with the Sadducees and Karaites, who rejected the Oral Tradition codified in the Mishnah, and held that the commandment "Do not light a fire in any of your dwellings on the Sabbath day" (Exodus 35:3) meant that the use of any light was forbidden, while the followers of Rabbinic Judaism, who accepted the authority of the Oral Tradition, held that the verse excluded kindling on the Sabbath but not the use of a light that had been lit before the Sabbath began.

Immediately following this chapter, in the Ashkenazi liturgy, but not the Sephardi, additional passages from the Babylonian Talmud are recited, including a paragraph from tractate Shabbat (12a), quoting Rabbi Haninah saying that one should examine one's clothing on the Sabbath eve before nightfall, to ensure one is not carrying anything, and Rabbi Yosef commenting that this is an important law about the Sabbath, as it is easy to forget and accidentally violate the sanctity of the day of rest.

The Sabbath hymn Yom Zeh M’khubad ("this day is the most precious of all days"), composed by an unidentified poet whose name appears in the acrostic as Yisrael Ha’Ger (Israel the proselyte) in the verses of the song, is based on the statement in this tractate (118a) that the best food should be prepared for the Sabbath, for "one who delights in the Sabbath is granted their heart's desires".
