= Shabbat siren =

Jewish custom

In some Jewish communities, a Shabbat siren is sounded announcing the imminent onset of Shabbat and the required cessation of melacha at that time.

== Overview ==
According to halakha, there are certain activities prohibited on Shabbat. Some Jewish communities sound a converted civil defense siren on Friday afternoon to announce that Shabbat will begin in order to warn and remind the local Jewish residents to stop doing such activities.

In Jerusalem, the siren goes off 40 minutes before Shabbat. In other areas, including Brooklyn, the siren is sounded twice, once 15 minutes before Shabbat and a second time immediately before the start of shabbos.

== History ==
The Talmud (Shabbat 35b) relates that on the eve of Shabbat, six shofar blasts (two series of Teki’a-Teru’a-Teki’a blows) were sounded to announce that Shabbat was approaching. Each blast represented a different act done to prepare for shabbos. The first blast told the workers in the fields to cease working and to return to the city. The second blast told shops and inns in the city to close their stores. The third shofar blow told the people of the city that it was time to light the shabbos candles. The last shofar blows told the people that it was the instant before shabbos. After the onset of shabbos the blower ceased blowing and released the shofar because it was forbidden to blow shofar on shabbos or even hold the shofar (mukzah). Rabbi Yaakov Chaim Sofer writes that this custom should be continued in a place where the Jewish populace is in control and unafraid of gentile repercussions. If an actual shofar cannot be used, a siren or bell can be used in its place.

Excavations of the kotel wall after the Six-Day War revealed a stone platform on the top of the southwest corner of the outer section of the wall. This platform was the place where the shofar blower would stand in temple times as shown from an inscription on the rock that says "the place of the trumpeter".

== Criticism ==
Many residents of Brooklyn neighborhoods that have such a siren have complained that the noise produced by the siren is too loud. One siren atop a synagogue in Bedford–Stuyvesant, Brooklyn has been said to reach 106 decibels.

In response to complaints from local residents, the New York City Department of Environmental Protection issued five noise code violation summonses to Yeshiva Toras Emes, a yeshiva located in Brooklyn that has such a siren. The Jewish residents protest this opposition, countering with the seeming acceptance of mosque's call to prayers which take place at sunrise, and which reach similar levels of noise.

== See also ==
- Loudspeakers in mosques
- Church bell
