= Driving on Shabbat =

Operation of a motor vehicle during Shabbat

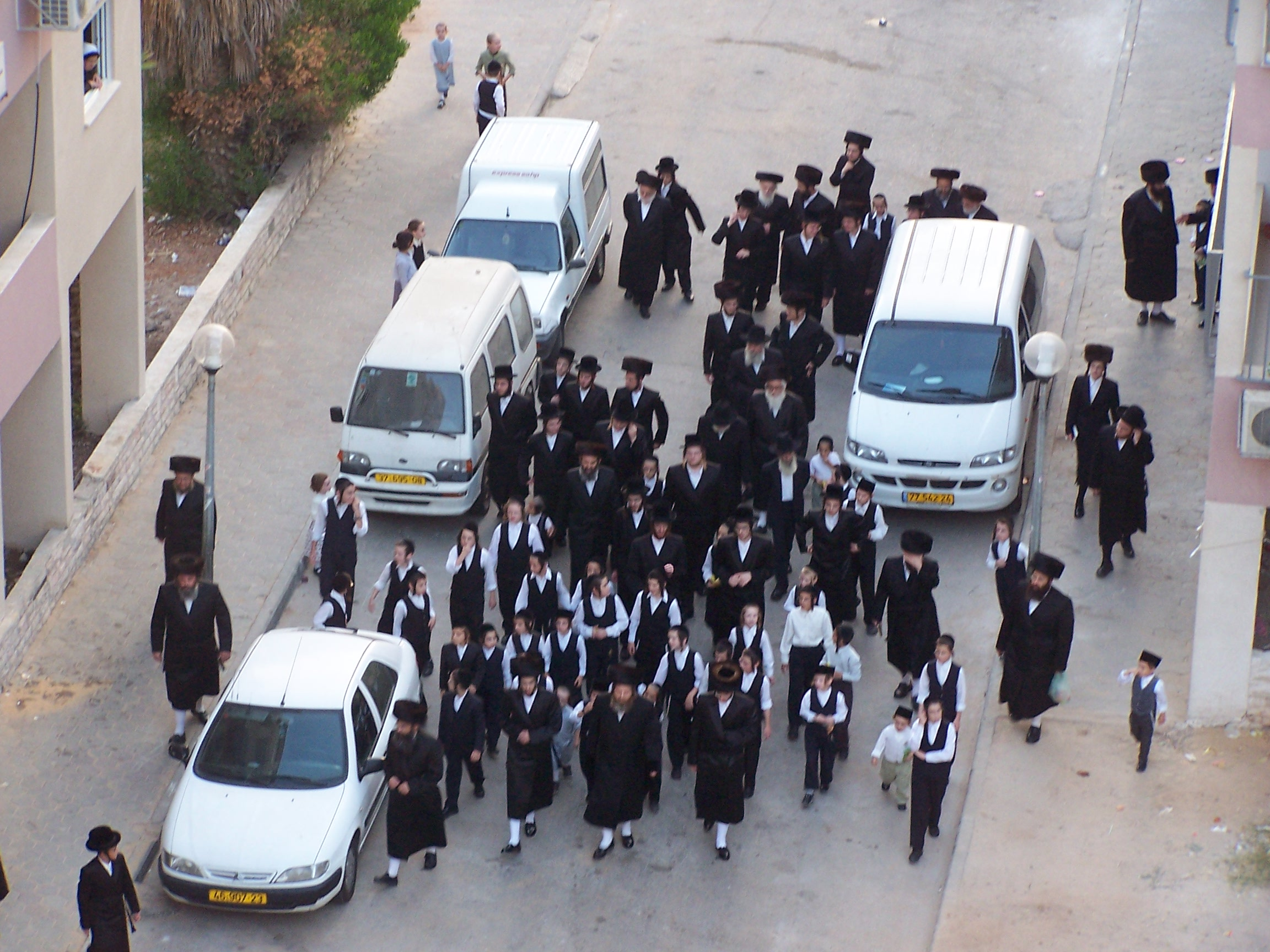
Orthodox Jews walking to synagogue on Shabbat in Rehovot, Israel

According to halacha, the operation of a motor vehicle constitutes multiple violations of the prohibited activities on Shabbat (the Jewish Sabbath). Though Jewish law is based on texts that were written long before the existence of the automobile, when driving one performs various actions which the texts specifically prohibit.

For example, the vehicle's ignition combusts fuel, which is considered to violate one of the 39 melachot, as well as creating a spark, which is likewise in violation of a related rabbinic (or possibly biblical) prohibition ("igniting a fire"). Modern vehicles also have many other electrical components, such as lights, that are turned on and off during the course of a vehicle's operation, often without the driver's awareness. Isaiah 58:13–14 calls on Jews to limit their travel during Shabbat, and the law of techum shabbat puts limits on the distance one may travel beyond the city/town where one is spending Shabbat, regardless of the method of transportation.

However, many non-Orthodox Jews have taken differing views on the matter, finding various reasons to permit and justify at least some driving on Shabbat, either solely for synagogue attendance or for other personal reasons as well. Ignoring Orthodox Jewish law, some feel that driving involves less effort than walking, while others feel that those who live too far from a synagogue would be cut off from religious life altogether if they do not drive to reach the synagogue, and the benefits outweigh full Shabbat observance. Other sources reject any defense of driving during Shabbat, arguing that to reject the prohibition would be a rejection of a God-given commandment.

According to both Orthodox and non-Orthodox Jews, driving on Shabbat is permitted (and required) when necessary to save a human life (pikuach nefesh).

== Views ==
=== Orthodox ===
Orthodoxy generally prohibits driving during Shabbat under all circumstances except for a life-threatening emergency.

Orthodox Jews have never challenged prohibitions against driving on Shabbat, but rather have striven to make any accommodations necessary to avoid this activity, including living within walking distance of a synagogue and other places where they wish to visit regularly during Shabbat, walking long distances when the need arises, and staying at home throughout Shabbat when this is not possible. Those who are travelling away from their hometown will attempt to find a hotel or other accommodations within a practical walk of their Shabbat needs.

While riding an animal, the primary ancient form of transportation, during Shabbat is rabbinically prohibited, the operation of an automobile is considered a direct violation of Torah law due to the burning of fuel, among other issues. Additionally, those who do drive frequently travel greater distances than those who walk, thereby leaving the boundaries of the local eruv and violating those Shabbat laws pertaining to traveling beyond the "boundary distance" (techum shabbat) and transferring between a public and private domain (hotza'ah).

Orthodox Jews do not view the use of the automobile in order to fulfill the mitzvah of attending synagogue as acceptable. In Orthodox Judaism, committing a sin in order to fulfill a mitzvah other than saving a human life (Pikuach Nefesh) is not considered Halachically acceptable, and if one cannot reach a synagogue by walking, it is preferable to pray at home. In particular, Orthodox Judaism frowns upon those who purchase a home too far to walk to a synagogue, then state they can only reach the synagogue by car, or those who live within a practical walk to a synagogue, but prefer attendance at one that can only be reached by car from their home.

Certain professionals who perform life-saving duties, such as physicians, may be permitted to drive during Shabbat to their place of employment in order to perform these duties, and may be permitted to drive home following the completion of their work. A non-professional who drives to a hospital during an emergency is not permitted to drive home, once the emergency situation has been stabilized. Parking and turning off the vehicle may not be permitted under these circumstances either, although moving the car out of the emergency lane is viewed with more leniency.

In practice, though truly Orthodox Jews generally do not drive during the Sabbath, some Jews use their vehicles to reach Orthodox synagogues for services. Some Modern Orthodox synagogues have a large number of non-Orthodox congregants who drive to their services. While some of these facilities allow congregants to park in their own lots, others will close off their parking and require those who drive to park elsewhere.

=== Conservative ===
The Conservative Movement examined the issue of driving on Shabbat during the 1950s and decided to allow limited use of the automobile strictly for the purpose of attending synagogue services. The need to reexamine the ruling came in response to demographic shifts, as many Jews were moving into suburban communities and no longer in walking distance of their synagogues. In accordance with these rulings, driving is not permitted for any other reason, including attendance at a social function at the synagogue that has no prayer involved (such as a Bar or Bat Mitzvah reception), as doing so is viewed as serving man and not God. Nevertheless, many Conservative Jews take this leniency further to allow driving for almost any reason they wish. Some Conservative Jews who follow a more stringent practice will refrain from driving at all during Shabbat, or will reserve driving for rare occasions for which they find it unavoidable.

The Conservative movement made the decision to permit driving to synagogue based on the changes in the way people were living. Since most people in the modern world live too far from a synagogue to walk, few Jews would possibly be able to attend synagogue without driving, which they believe could lead to the collapse of Jewish observance.

There are some within the Conservative movement, however, who frown upon the Conservative practice of driving during Shabbat on the basis that other Jewish laws are typically broken when driving takes place. These include the handling of one's wallet or purse (a muktzah item), since it contains one's driver's license; the purchase of gasoline, a business transaction; and the distance of travel, which usually extends outside the boundaries of an eruv.

During the 1990s, the Conservative-affiliated Masorti Movement in Israel took the stricter view and banned all driving on Shabbat on the basis that no one in Israel works on Shabbat, and that it is possible to pray at home simply by opening a siddur.

More importantly, aside from all the 'minor' transgressions above, according to many authorities, one is actually transgressing the Mishnaic decree not to ignite a fire on Shabbat.

=== Reform ===
Reform Judaism, which does not consider halakha binding, has long permitted driving during Shabbat. Most members of Reform congregations drive to services, as well as to other Shabbat activities.

One rationale permitting driving on Shabbat is that in society where cars are common, it is more 'restful' to drive to observe a positive mitzvah (attending Shabbat services).

== Riding in a vehicle ==
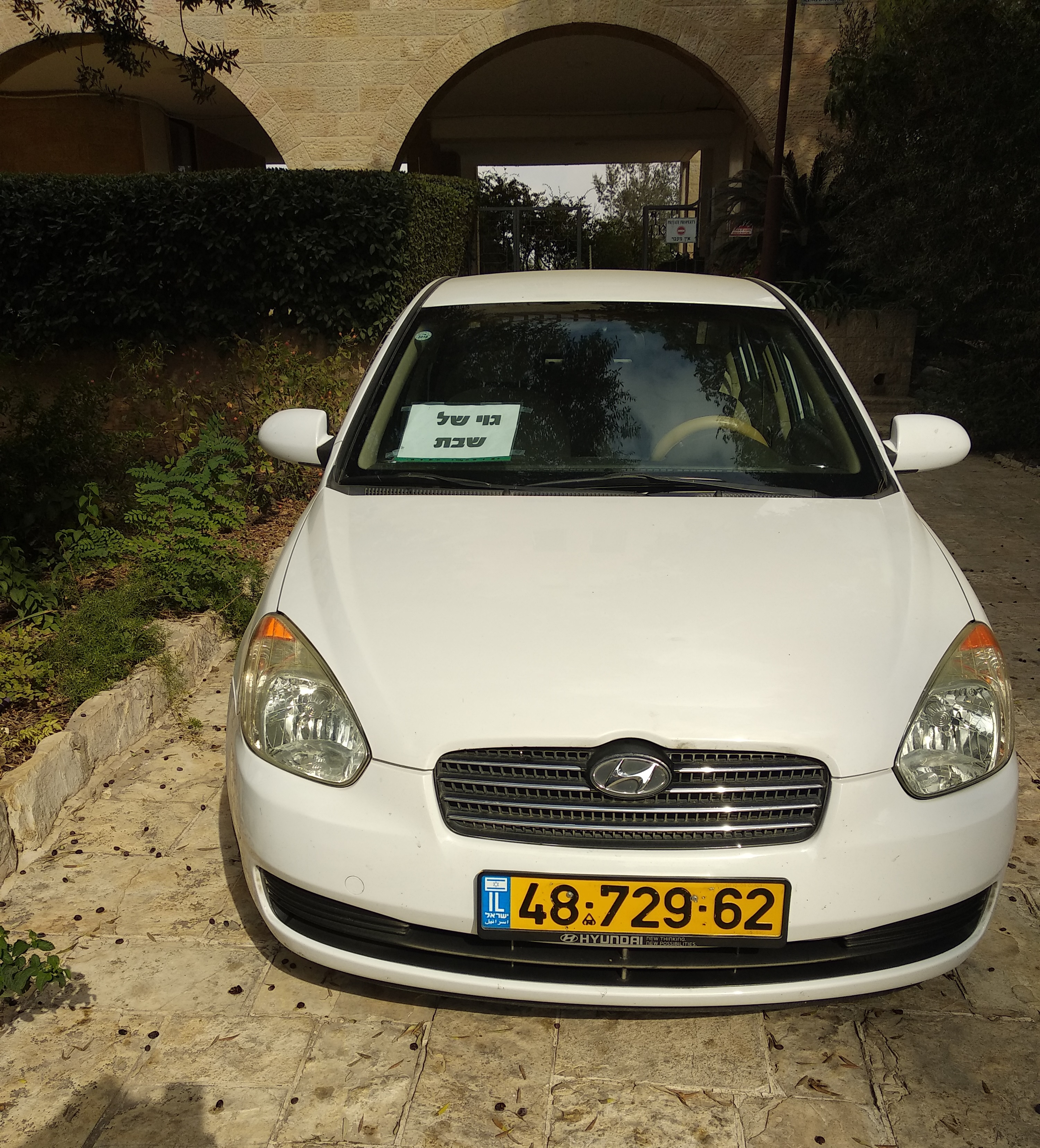
Car in Jerusalem with sign "Shabbos goy" in window; some Jews will ride as a passenger on Shabbat if necessary.

While the operation of a motor vehicle clearly violates Shabbat laws, another question is if it is permissible to ride as a passenger in a vehicle driven by a gentile during Shabbat.

Some Orthodox rabbis have ruled that besides the appearance being given, since a passenger being present in a vehicle may cause the vehicle to require additional fuel versus the absence of that passenger, this practice is generally not permitted. It may be permissible, however, if a Jew has a medical reason that is short of life-threatening, for the passenger to be transported in a vehicle.

Some Orthodox rabbis believe that riding in a pre-programmed self-driving car may be halachically permissible, but may be against the spirit of the law.

== Special situations ==
=== Life-threatening emergencies ===
In the event of a life-threatening emergency, all of the laws of Shabbat, including those related to driving, are suspended.

==== Medical emergencies ====
When it is necessary to drive someone to the hospital, the driver must put the car in 'Park', leave the engine running, and leave the door open, since closing the door will cause the dome light to turn off. A non-Jew should then be asked to park the car. Rabbi Moshe Feinstein is famous for allowing someone in this position to drive home (in certain situations), even though there is no medical reason to drive home, so that someone who is in need of medical treatment will not forgo that treatment because they would be stuck at the hospital until the end of Shabbat. Others require that travel home from the hospital be conducted by a non-Jew, for example a taxi driver.

==== Visiting others in hospital ====
If a close relative is taken by ambulance to the hospital on Shabbat, it may be permissible to accompany that relative. If the relative is not coherent, others may be required to provide authorization for life-saving treatment, and the mere presence of visitors can have a salutary effect on patients.

==== Labor ====
Labor is considered a life-threatening emergency, thereby permitted driving during Shabbat. If a woman is transported to the hospital as a result of false labor, and then sent home, she must be driven home by a gentile.

==== Security ====
When there is a threat on human life from belligerent foes, driving is permitted. Therefore, police, army, and other security personnel are permitted to drive. It is common in Israel that observant Jews that otherwise abide by the prohibition of driving, drive while in the army or when patrolling their town as a volunteer Civil Guard.

=== Non-life-threatening health problems ===
When a medical issue occurs that is not considered life-threatening, but is of discomfort to a person, or may endanger one's limb, it is acceptable to ask a gentile if available to drive the patient to a hospital or physician.

==== Fertility treatment ====
Some rabbinical authorities have ruled that in the event that a couple is undergoing treatment for infertility and has the need to receive a treatment during Shabbat that cannot otherwise be avoided, transportation provided by a gentile can be arranged prior to Shabbat, in which the gentile opens and closes the doors of the car for the Jew. All arrangements must be made in advance.

== In Israel ==
In Israel, streets in some Haredi neighborhoods are barricaded on Shabbat in order to prevent non-Shabbat-observers from driving. In Mea Shearim, residents have been known to throw stones at those driving through their neighborhoods on Shabbat, notwithstanding that handling a stone on Shabbat is halakhically forbidden. In most Israeli cities, public buses do not operate during Shabbat. Part of the population in Israel view it as sinful to drive on Shabbat and are annoyed by those who do so.

== See also ==
- Electricity on Shabbat
- Shemirat Shabbat Kehilchatah
