= Chazal =

Jewish sages of the Mishna, Tosefta and Talmud eras

Chazal, Hazal or Ḥazal (Hebrew: חָזָ״ל, romanized: ḥāzāl, an acronym of 'our sages, of blessed memory') (Note: An acronym for חכמינו זכרונם לברכה "ḥachamenu Zikhronam Livrakha", meaning "Our Sages, may their memory be blessed".) are the Jewish sages of the Mishnaic and Talmudic eras, spanning from the final 300 years of the Second Temple period until the 7th century, or c. 250 BCE – c. 625 CE. Their authority was mostly in the field of Halakha (Jewish law) and less regarding Jewish theology.

== Rabbinic eras (eras of Halacha) ==
The Chazal are generally divided according to their era and the major written products thereof:

- Soferim ("Scribes"): The sages from the period preceding Ezra and up to the era of the Zugot, including the men of the Great Assembly. Traditionally, the era of the Soferim is assumed to have stretched from the receipt of the Torah by Moses on Sinai to the era of the earliest halakha, including the times of Simeon the Just.
- Zugot ("Pairs"): Five pairs of sages from consecutive generations who lived during a period of roughly 100 years toward the end of the Second Temple period. (142 – c. 40 BCE)
- Tannaim ("Teachers"): The sages of the Mishnah who lived in the Land of Israel until 220 CE. In addition to the Mishnah, their writings were preserved in the Midrash. Key figures among the Tannaim include Yohanan ben Zakkai, Rabbi Akiva, and Judah ha-Nasi.
- Amoraim ("Expounders"): The sages of the Talmud active during the codification of the Mishnah and until the finalization of the Talmud (220–500). The Amoraim were active in two areas: Palestine and Lower Mesopotamia (called "Babylonia"). In addition to the Babylonian Talmud and the Jerusalem Talmud, their writings were preserved in midrashim such as the Midrash Rabba.
- Savoraim ("Reasoners"): The sages of the batte midrash or houses of Torah study in Babylonia from the end of the era of the Amoraim (5th century) to the early Geonim (from the end of the 6th century or the midst of the 7th century).

== Chazal's authority ==
Until the end of the Savoraim era, the Chazal had the authority to comment on the Torah according to the standards of Talmudical hermeneutics as defined by the Law given to Moses at Sinai—sometimes even expounding a word or phrase outside its plain and ordinary sense. Nowadays in Orthodox Judaism, the authority of Chazal is not delegated to the current generation's sages; thus, the Torah cannot be commented upon in matters concerning Halakha if it contradicts Chazal's commentary.

Until the middle of the Tannaim era, when there was a Sanhedrin (a high court of Jewish law), the Chazal also had the authority to decree restrictions and to enact new religious regulations—in any matter they saw fit—concerning issues that were not included in the Torah, written or oral. The list of Talmudic principles includes the holidays of Purim and Hanukkah, the laws of muktzeh ("set-aside items") on Shabbat, the ritual washing of one's hands (netilat yadayim) before eating bread, the construction of eruvim (liminal gateways), and the institution of the current schedule of daily prayer services: shacharit (morning prayer), mincha (afternoon prayer), and ma'ariv (evening prayer).

== See also ==
- Jewish commentaries on the Bible
- Rabbinic period
