= Hotzaah =

Transferring between domains

Hotzaah (Hebrew: הוצאה), more specifically hotzaah mereshut lereshut (הוצאה מרשות לרשות) or transferring between domains, is one of the activities prohibited on Shabbat in Judaism.

== Biblical sources ==
While there is no explicit prohibition in the written Torah on carrying objects between domains on the Sabbath, the Talmud and later commentators suggest several indirect sources for the prohibition:

- "Moses commanded ... Let no man or woman do any more work for the holy donation, and the people ceased to bring." (Exodus 36:6) - according to the Talmud, this was said in regard to the approaching Shabbat, and thus the people refrained from bringing their handiwork from their tents to the Tabernacle site.
- "Let no man go out from his place on the seventh day" (Exodus 16:29) - according to the Talmud, this prohibition on collecting manna on Shabbat was necessary because manna could not be carried to the Israelites' homes.
- According to the Talmud, the wood-gatherer in Numbers 15:32 was executed because he violated the prohibition of transferring wood between domains.
- As part of the work to build the Tabernacle, its beams were lifted from the ground to carts to be transported.

The book of Jeremiah is more explicit, specifying two types of forbidden carrying (into the gates of Jerusalem, or out of an individual's house):

Thus says the LORD: Take heed for the sake of your souls, and carry no burden on the Sabbath day, nor bring it in by the gates of Jerusalem; nor carry forth a burden out of your houses on the Sabbath day, nor do any work; but rather make holy the Sabbath day - as I commanded your fathers, but they listened not, nor inclined their ear, but made their neck stiff, that they might not hear, nor receive instruction. And it shall be if you listen to Me, says the LORD, not to bring any burden into the gates of this city on the Sabbath day, and to make holy the Sabbath day not to perform any labor on it. Then shall there enter into the gates of this city kings and princes sitting on David's throne, riding in chariots and with horses, they and their princes the men of Judah and the inhabitants of Jerusalem, and this city shall be inhabited forever.

— Jeremiah 17:21–26

The book of Nehemiah contains a similar description:

In those days I saw in Judah some treading winepresses on the sabbath, and bringing in heaps of corn, and lading donkeys with it; as also wine, grapes, and figs, and all manner of burdens, which they brought into Jerusalem on the sabbath day. ... Then I contended with the nobles of Judah, and said to them: "What evil thing is this that you do, and profane the sabbath day?" ... And when the gates of Jerusalem began to be dark before the sabbath, I commanded that the doors should be shut, and commanded that they should not be opened until after the sabbath; and some of my servants set I over the gates, that there should no burden be brought in on the sabbath day.

— Nehemiah 13:15–19

== Domains ==
According to halacha, all areas are divided into four categories:

- A private domain (Reshut HaYachid).
- A public domain, or thoroughfare (Reshut HaRabbim).
- A neutral domain - a place that is not a public domain nor private domain (Karmelit).
- An exempt domain (Mekom Petur).

The neutral domain is defined as not bounded by walls or fences, and which also is not traversed by large numbers of people. By the Torah, the neutral domain is considered an exempt domain; however rabbinic enactments treat it more strictly.

Two activities are biblically forbidden:

- Transferring an object from a private domain to a public thoroughfare, or vice versa.
- Transferring an object a distance of 4 cubits in a public thoroughfare.

In addition, three activities are rabbinically forbidden:

- Transferring an object from a private domain to a neutral domain, or vice versa.
- Transferring an object a distance of 4 cubits in a neutral domain.
- Transferring an object between two different private domains.

The following activities are permitted:

- Transferring an object within a single private domain.
- Transferring an object between an exempt area and any other domains. However, it is sometimes forbidden to use an exempt area as a "stopover" when the intent is to transfer between two other domains.
- Transferring an object across multiple open areas, as long as the total distance carried is less than 4 cubits.

== Methods of transfer ==
The Torah law of hotzaah is violated only if a single person picks up an object (akirah) in one domain and deposits it (hanacha) in another domain (or at a distance of four cubits, as applicable). This has the following implications:

- If a person picks up an object and begins walking, the Torah law has not been violated until he stops walking (stopping while holding an object is considered tantamount to depositing the object). Even a brief pause to rest is considered a hanacha which causes Torah law to be violated.
- If a person did not pick up an object at all, but rather the object was deposited in his hands by another person while he was walking, he does not violate Torah law even after stopping, as he never performed akirah.
- If two people carried an object together (such as two people lifting opposite ends of a box), neither one has violated Torah law. However, this is rabbinically forbidden.
- If a person picked up an object in a private domain, exited to a public domain, continued walking to another private domain, and deposited the object there - he has not violated Torah law. This is because he never picked up or deposited the object in the public domain, so there was no forbidden transfer between public and private domains. Of course, if at any point while walking in the public domain he stopped momentarily, that would cause Torah law to be violated. In any case, transfer between two different private domains violates rabbinic law.

If a person, while walking, lets the object he is holding approach within three handbreadths of the ground, it is considered as if the object has been placed on the ground. This can generate additional violations of Torah law. This is due to the principle of lavud, also used when constructing a sukkah.

Throwing an object from one domain to another has the same rules as carrying the object between those domains.

== See also ==
- Activities prohibited on Shabbat
- Eruv
- Shabbat (Talmud)
