= Loudspeakers in mosques =

A mosque minaret in Hyderabad, Pakistan fitted with loudspeakers.

Loudspeakers were invented in the early 20th century, and they were introduced in mosques in the 1930s, where they are used by a muezzin for the adhan ("call to prayer"), and sometimes for khutbah in Islam. Outdoor loudspeakers, usually mounted on tall minarets, are used five times a day for the call to prayer. Loudspeakers are sometimes also used inside mosques to deliver sermons or for prayer. Electrically amplified adhans have become commonplace in countries such as Turkey and Morocco, whereas in others such as the Netherlands only 7 to 8% of all mosques employ loudspeakers for the call to prayer.

The loudspeakers are also used as an early warning system and function as civil defense sirens in countries such as Turkey and the United Arab Emirates.

== History ==
The first known installation of a microphone–loudspeaker set occurred in 1936 in the Sultan Mosque in Singapore; it was reported that the summons to prayer could 'carry more than a mile'. Though some mosque attendees were sceptical of this new electric system, most believed it was necessary to empower the muezzin's voice to transcend a modern city's noises.

== Usage ==
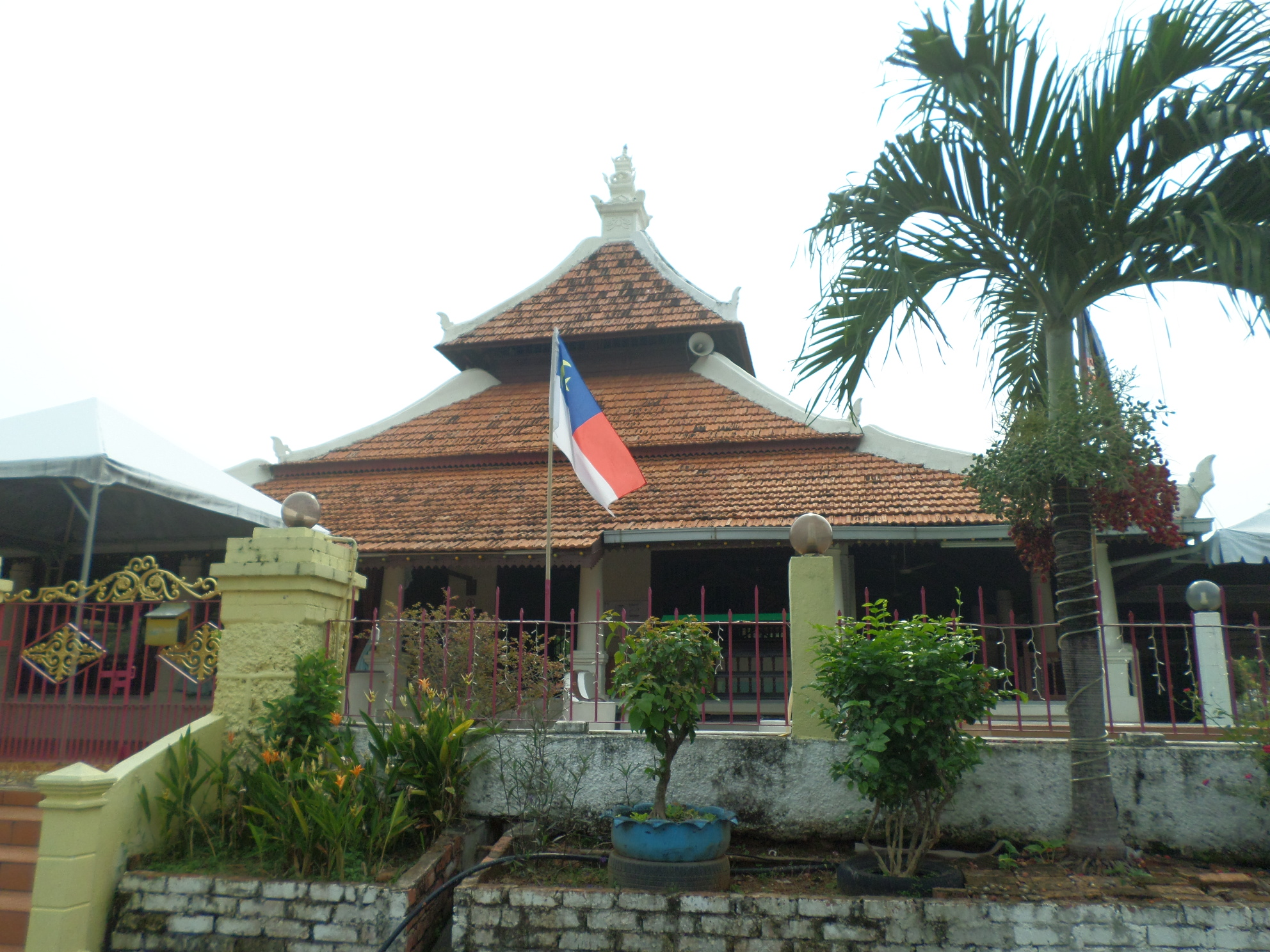
Loudspeaker in a mosque in Melaka, Malaysia.

The loudspeakers also function as early warning system and can work as sirens in countries such as Turkey and the United Arab Emirates to warn of emergencies or disasters.

Modern mosque loudspeaker volume can generate noise pollution, which prompted Saudi Arabia's Ministry Of Islamic Affairs to issue a directive in late May 2021 to restrict mosque loudspeaker volumes to "one third of maximum". The Ministry also stipulated that loudspeaker use was to be restricted to the calls to prayers only.

In areas where more than one mosque is present, the loudspeaker sounds may overlap one another.

== Legality ==
Limitation on calls to prayer by Muslims exist in countries including Canada, the Netherlands, Germany, Switzerland, France, the UK, Austria, Norway, and Belgium. New Zealand does not have specific restrictions on mosques, but rules that control the volume of amplified noise in general will often prevent mosques from using loudspeakers. The city of Wellington is considering whether to provide an exemption for one mosque in the city.

Some cities have independently banned or restricted the use of loudspeakers by mosques, including Lagos, Nigeria, and some communities in the US state of Michigan.

In Malaysia in July 2024, a royal command from the reigning King of the country, directed that the Adhan be the only service to be broadcast through external loudspeakers, with recitations of the Quran, prayers and religious lectures to be restricted to the premise's internal loudspeakers.

== Opposition ==
=== Germany ===
In Cologne, Germany, the proposed construction of the Cologne Central Mosque encountered strong criticism from some area residents; a ban on broadcasting the call to prayer over loudspeakers outside the building was among the first stipulations that the mosque's supporters had to agree to when seeking a building permit.

=== India ===
In India, noise pollution activists have called for restricting the use of loudspeakers, stating religion is not a ground to violate noise rules. In 1999, in debating a proposed blanket ban on loudspeakers atop mosques, some political leaders in India alleged that loudspeakers had been used to create communal tension, and that they had been used to incite a riot in Nandurbar, Maharashtra, on November 10, 1999.

=== Indonesia ===
Indonesia, the world's most populous Muslim nation, has recognized that the overzealous use of sound amplification by its many mosques is an environmental issue and appears to be taking official measures to curb the problem. However, in August 2018, a woman who complained of the volume of her local mosque's speakers was eventually given an 18-month prison sentence for blasphemy, while mobs burned 14 Buddhist temples following the news of her complaint against the loudspeakers. As a direct response to this incident, the Ministry of Religious Affairs issued a circular on adhan, with guidelines on when and how it ought to be broadcast by mosques. The issue continues to divide as of March 2022, when the Ministry issued even stricter guidelines, which included restricting sound levels to 100 decibels, with no mention of distance from the source of sound output, and any pre-call to prayer sermons to 10 minutes' duration, down from the previous 15.

=== Mauritius ===
On the island of Mauritius, where Muslims make up just over 18 percent of the population, the excessive use of amplification threatened national security following a court ruling in March 2007. Judge Paul Lam Shang Leen ruled that the use of loudspeakers and amplification outside the Hidayat-E-Islam mosque in a residential area of Quatre-Bornes for Azaan to be unlawful, and to be a breach of Noise Prevention Regulations (1939 et 1955). This followed a court action initiated by lawyer Gavin Glover against the Municipality of Quatre-Bornes. Soon after the court ruling, a large crowd of protesters assembled in front of Gavin Glover's house and another group was preparing to protest in front of the National Assembly. Various politicians intervened in an attempt to prevent further escalation of the situation.

=== United Kingdom ===
On 5 May 2020 Waltham Forest council, London, gave eight mosques permission to publicly broadcast its call to prayer during Ramadan. On 14 May 2020 Newham Council followed suit, granting permission to nineteen mosques within the London borough to publicly broadcast its call to prayer during Ramadan. Many residents in the area of Newham, in dispute of the decision, wrote to the Mayor's office occupied by Rokshana Fiaz. On the 20 May 2020 residents concerned with the public broadcast to prayer received a response back from the Mayor in which she stated: "I am sorry if you were offended by the call to prayer, but the Council does not propose to take any further action or correspond further on this matter."

Harrow Council proposed a planning application to allow Harrow Central Mosque to publicly broadcast its prayer call every Friday at 6 pm for three months.

On 31 May 2020, Maidenhead Mosque was given permission by Maidenhead council to publicly broadcast its call to prayer on a one-off occasion.

=== United States ===
In 2004, the Al-Islah Mosque in Hamtramck, Michigan, US, attracted national attention when it requested permission to broadcast its call to prayer. This upset many of the non-Muslim residents of the area, which has a large and long-established Polish Catholic population. Proponents pointed out that the city was already subject to loud bell ringing from the local church, while opponents argued that the church bells served a nonreligious purpose. Later that year, the city amended its noise regulations to limit the volume of all religious sounds. Prior to this, other mosques in the Detroit area had been using loudspeakers to broadcast their calls to prayer without incident.

== See also ==
- Church bell
- Shabbat siren
- NIMBY
- Aircraft noise pollution
- Environmental noise
