= Avraham Danzig =

Rabbi and codifier of Jewish law

Avraham ben Yehiel Michael Danzig (Hebrew: אברהם דנציג; 1748–1820) was a rabbi, posek (legal decisor) and codifier, best known as the author of the works of Jewish law called Chayei Adam and Chochmat Adam. He is sometimes referred to as "the Chayei Adam".

== Biography ==
Danzig was born in Danzig (Gdańsk), Poland (hence his name), in 1747 or 1748 into a prominent rabbinic family. When he was fourteen, his father sent him to study at the Prague yeshivah, after exacting a promise from him "that he would not mingle with the Moderns" who were then gradually coming into prominence through the influence of Moses Mendelssohn.

He studied in Prague for four years under Rabbi Yechezkel Landau and Rabbi Joseph Liebermann. He was then offered a position as rabbi in Vilna, but declined, earning his livelihood as a merchant (frequenting the fairs of Leipzig and Königsberg – which are referred to in his writings). Only in his later years, and after having lost almost his entire fortune through the explosion of a powder-magazine, could he be induced to accept the position of dayan in Vilna, where he served until 1812. He died there on September 12, 1820.

Danzig is one of three authorities on whom Rabbi Shlomo Ganzfried based his rulings in the Kitzur Shulchan Aruch.

His descendants include Rabbi Neil Danzig and Rabbi Joseph Meyer Danzig, son of Rabbi Avraham Mordechai Danzig, who was born in Jerusalem and named after his prominent ancestor.

== Works ==
Danzig wrote several important works, but he is especially known for Chayei Adam and Chochmat Adam, his works of halacha covering the laws of the Shulchan Aruch dealing with everyday life.

Chayei Adam (Hebrew: חיי אדם, "The Life of Man") deals with the laws discussed in the Orach Chayim section of the Shulchan Aruch. It is divided into 224 sections – 69 dealing with daily conduct and prayer, and 155 with Shabbat, and holidays. In this work, Danzig collected and critically sifted the Acharonic material, in the field of halakha written in the more than two and a half centuries since the appearance of the Shulchan Aruch. Chayei Adam was intended primarily "for the cultured layman", as opposed to rabbinic scholars, and the work is thus presented in a readily accessible form. The parallel work Nishmat Adam, published together with Chayei Adam, discusses the halachic issues in greater depth. The two are usually printed together. In many cities, societies were formed for the purpose of studying Chayei Adam.

Chochmat Adam (Hebrew: חכמת אדם, "The Wisdom of Man"), similarly, discusses the laws in the Yoreh De'ah section of the Shulchan Aruch, as well as laws from the Even Ha'ezer and Choshen Mishpat sections pertinent to everyday life. Binat Adam on this work corresponds to the Nishmat Adam on Chayei Adam. Chochmat Adam was written in consultation with two of the greatest Torah scholars of the time – Chaim Volozhin and Yaakov of Lisa.

The scholarship of these works is evidenced by the fact that Rabbi Chaim Volozhin, known for his opposition to "digests of halacha", granted the work his approbation (on condition that each section be cross-referenced to the Shulchan Aruch to allow for further study). Reportedly, the Chatam Sofer instructed his son that when unable to refer to the Shulchan Aruch, he could refer to the Chochmat Adam in making a halachic decision

Other works by Danzig include:

- Zichru Torat Moshe – an introduction to the laws of Shabbos.
- Kitzur Sefer Charedim – an abridgement of the classic Sefer Charedim by Rabbi Elazar Ezkari.
- Toldot Adam – a commentary on the Passover Haggadah.

Danzig also wrote Tefillah Zakah, a penitential prayer recited by many on the eve of Yom Kippur.

== Gunpowder Purim ==
On November 18, 1804, a gunpowder magazine exploded accidentally in Vilna, killing 31 people and destroying a large amount of property. This explosion occurred at Vilna fort and spread to areas nearby. Among those who lost his home and his business was Rabbi Avraham Danzig. Yet Rabbi Danzig and his family were spared from death, and so grateful was he for this that he declared the date of the conflagration to be a "Pulverpurim" (Gunpowder Purim) for the Danzig family. According to this custom, the 15th of Kislev is a fast day, with the giving of extra charity. On the following night, which is the 16th of Kislev, a Meal of Thanksgiving (Seudas Hodaah) is eaten.

== Resources ==
- Chayei Adam fulltext (Hebrew), daat.ac.il
- Chochmat Adam fulltext (Hebrew), daat.ac.il
