= Horbat 'Uza =

Archaeological site in Israel

- Location within Israel
- 32.913537°N 35.150565°E
- Location: Northern Coastal Plain, east of Acre, Israel
- New Israel Grid; Palestine grid: 2143-47/7574-77 (NIG); 164/257 (PAL)

Horbat 'Uza (Hebrew: חורבת עוצה and Hebrew: חירבת אל עיאדייה) is an archaeological site located in the Northern Coastal Plain, 8 km east of Acre, Israel. Interesting findings from the Neolithic, classical antiquity and Crusader period have been made during salvage excavations caused by the construction of a modern highway and a new railway line cutting through the site.

Remains excavated at the site span 7,000 years of human habitation. Saladin encamped there during the Siege of Acre (1189–1191).

== Name ==
The Hebrew name is Ḥorvat ‘Uẓa, "‘Uza ruins", and is commonly referred to as Horbat 'Uza, possibly in order to distinguish it from Horvat Uza, an archaeological site from the Arad Valley in the Negev.

The Arabic name is Khirbet el-‘Ayadiya (el-‘Ayadiya is spelled العياضية, العيادية, or القياضية, in which khirbet means "ruins of", "ruined settlement of"), translated by Palmer as "The ruin of the 'Aiyadiyeh Arabs", and more literally meaning "‘Ayadiya ruins".

== Location ==
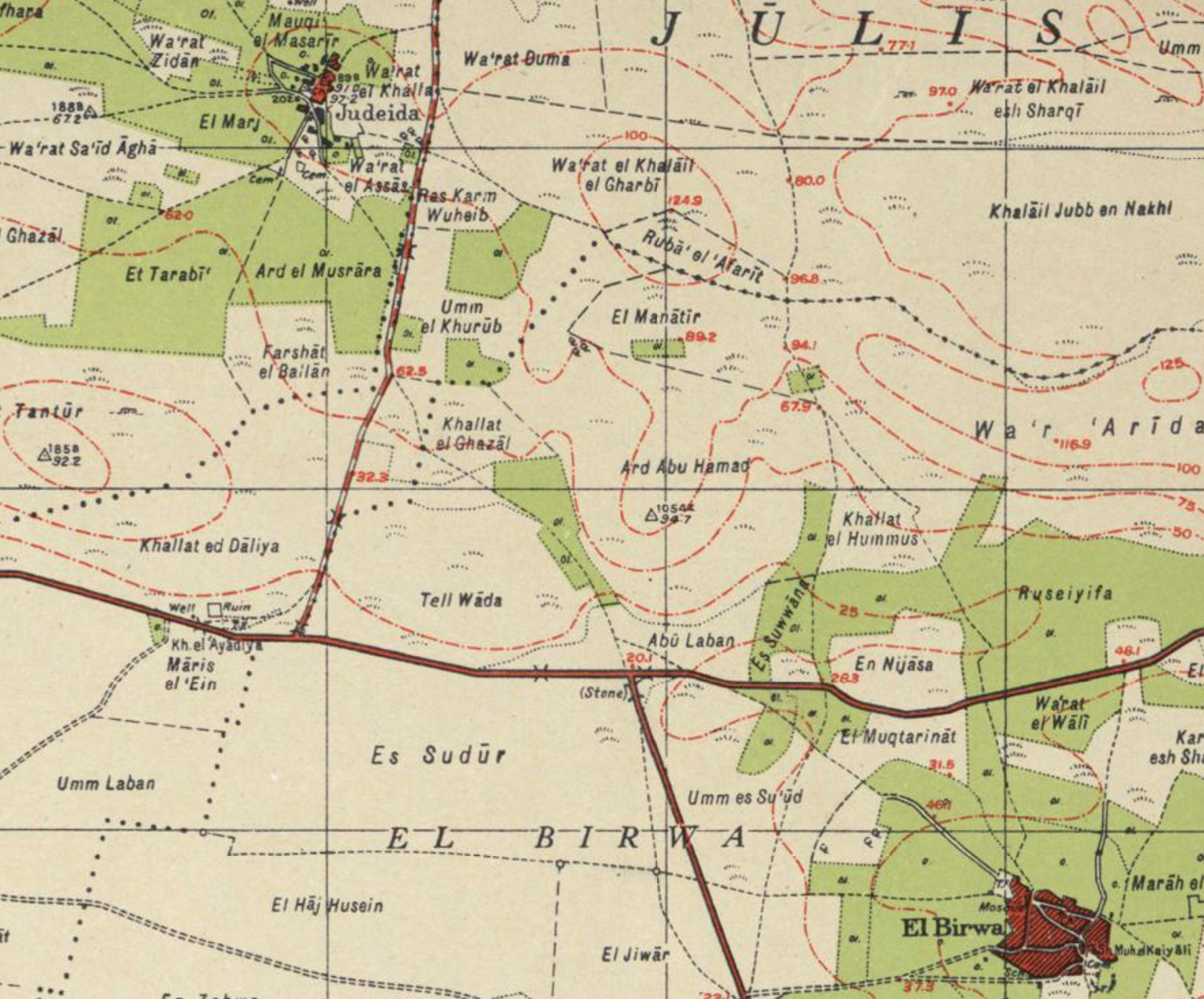
Khirbet el-‘Ayadiya on a 1940s Survey of Palestine map, south of Judeida (today the Arab-Israeli town of Jadeidi-Makr) and west of the Palestinian Arab town of Al-Birwa (depopulated, today Moshav Ahihud)

Horbat 'Uza stands in the centre of the Akko (Acre) Plain, between its northern and southern parts. It is situated at the foot of a hill rising steeply north of it, and stretches over an area of about 400 x 200 metres (c. 60 dunams), with a small tell on its western side and a five-metre deep well, surrounded by a structure, at the centre of the tell. The "good spring-well" seen by the British surveyors in the 1870s used to provide drinking water even in times of drought, but has dried up in recent years due to overpumping that has led to a fall in the groundwater level.

The site is cut in two by an old west–east road now used by the modern Highway 85 (Acre-Karmiel-Amiad). This road only became important from the Crusader period onwards, connecting the coast and Acre to Damascus via the Daughters of Jacob Bridge and the Golan Heights. The laying of the railroad track for a new line connecting Acre and Karmiel prompted yet another salvage dig in late 2011.

== History and archaeology ==
The main excavation, which took place in 1991, has identified twenty-one habitation levels on the small tell.

=== Prehistoric periods ===
Archaeologists have excavated artifacts from the end of the Pre-Pottery Neolithic period (PPNC), as well as from the Pottery Neolithic (PN), the latter being closely related to the Yarmukian and Jericho IX cultures.

During the Early Chalcolithic period the settlement was relatively extensive, but only isolated finds were brought to light from the Late Chalcolithic.

=== Bronze Age ===
A short-lived, larger settlement dates back to the Early Bronze Age IA, but it's already abandoned by the Early Bronze Age IB, when a new settlement was established at nearby Akko. After a gap of almost 1000 years, a small agricultural village develops at the site during the Intermediate Bronze Age. With no permanent habitation during the Middle Bronze Age IIB, just a very small settlement follows in the Late Bronze Age.

The site remained uninhabited throughout the Iron Age.

=== Persian and Hellenistic periods ===
A large settlement is established at Horbat 'Uza in the 5th century BCE, during the Persian period. After a short gap, a small area is resettled during the Hellenistic period, starting in the mid-3rd century BCE. Once the large Hellenistic city of Akko expands, the population from Horbat 'Uza and other neighbouring sites is moving to the city, leaving the site abandoned by the first half of the second century BCE.

=== Late Roman and Byzantine periods ===
The Late Roman and Byzantine periods are characterised by pottery manufacture, starting in the 4th century CE. A settlement occupies the site in the Byzantine period until c. 630, when the pottery manufacture also ceases. A church attests to the presence of Christians.

==== Jewish community ====
Stratum 8, dating from c. 340–410 CE, contains elements of Jewish material culture. They include a group of ceramic stands that supported oil lamps, storage jars decorated with colourful menorah patterns, and a cave with Jewish burials.

Sabbath lampstands

The unique type of Sabbath lampstands found at H. 'Uza attempted at solving a problem observant Jews had at the time. Houses were rather dark, oil lamps were the common solution, but they didn't hold enough fuel as to last through the entire day of rest, the Sabbath. One of the lampstands has the word "Shabbat" (שבת) engraved on it in Hebrew, which helped with identifying their use. The solution offered by the H. 'Uza lampstand model was a cup-like ceramic vessel larger than the lamp itself, with a flat-topped support raising from its bottom, on which the oil lamp would be placed. The remaining empty space around the support would function as an additional, external oil reservoir for the lamp, offering several options for how to position a long wick that would allow the flame not to go out. The Mishna, redacted about a century and a half earlier, dealt in one of its tractates (Shabbat 2:4) with the interdiction of moving a lamp or adding oil to it during Sabbath, and offered instructions on what means would be allowed. The H. 'Uza device offers a good practical illustration on how the problem was actually solved and had no known parallels by the time it was published in 1996. For archaeologists today, it offers a clear ethnic marker for the inhabitants at the site, the only ones in need of such a device being Jews or Samaritans.

Menorah bread stamp

A 6th-century bread stamp (signum pistoris) made of fired clay bearing the Jewish symbol of the menorah was at the time of its discovery a novelty in that it provided evidence for a Jewish community at Uza in a period when the region around Acre was predominantly Christian. The menorah bread stamp is the first one of its kind discovered in a controlled excavation, and the excavators have speculated that kosher bread from Uza was delivered to the Jews of nearby Acre. The name of the baker is engraved in Greek letters on the stamp handle, probably reading "Launtius", a common name among Jews of the period. It actually appears on a second Jewish bread stamp, whose provenance is however unknown. A specialist's opinion is that the bread dough was marked twice: with the menorah, which was engraved on the stamp before it being fired, and again with the baker's name, which each individual baker scratched into the handle of the already fired stamp after purchasing it from the potter who manufactured the stamps.

=== Early Islamic, Crusader/Ayyubid, Mamluk and Ottoman periods ===
Occupation was renewed during the Early Islamic period, either under Abbasid or Fatimid rule.

Crusader pottery from the early part of their rule in the 12th century could be found, when the place was known by the Franks as "Hadia", their way of pronouncing the Arabic 'Ayadiya. During the Third Crusade, in 1189–1191, the area became a battleground and Muslim soldiers were stationed at "Tell Hajal", as the place was called by Arab chroniclers. Once the fighting ended, Tell Hajal, which had its own suq (market), was abandoned. The Frankish farmhouse which stood there was destroyed during the fighting, only to be rebuilt in 1254, along with a new Crusader village now called "La Hadia" by Western chroniclers. With the defeat of the Crusaders at the hands of the Mamluks, the village was abandoned. During the Mamluk period, between the 13th and 16th century, archaeological findings only indicate the sporadic presence of transient settlers.

In the 16th century, i.e. early Ottoman era, Ayadiyah was classified as Mezraa, that is fields in the Ottoman tax-records. It was also classified as Mülk land. In 1881, the PEF's Survey of Western Palestine (SWP) found at Kh. Aiyadiyeh: "Heaps of stones, of small size; a good spring-well near."

== See also ==
- Kosher Bread Stamp
