= Kosher Bread Stamp =

- Material: Ceramic
- Writing: Greek letters
- Created: 4-5th century CE
- Period/culture: Byzantine Period
- Discovered: Horbat 'Uza, Israel

The 'Kosher Bread Stamp' is an ancient stamp that dates back to the 5th century CE. Written in the paleo-Hebrew alphabet, it is part of a larger group of artifacts known as Canaanite and Aramaic seal inscriptions.

== Discovery ==
The Israel Antiquities Authority found the stamp during excavations at Horbat Uza.

== The Stamp ==
The ceramic stamp is engraved with a seven-branched Temple menorah at its narrow base. A number of Greek letters and a dot are engraved around a circle and on the end of the handle.

The artifact was used to identify Kosher goods and likely belonged to a bakery that supplied Jewish people in Acre.

The name "Launtius" engraved on the handle of the stamp is likely the name of the baker.

== See also ==
- Byzantine Period
- Governor of Jerusalem Seal
- Shema Seal
