= Yechezkel Landau =

18th century European rabbi & halachic authority

Yechezkel Halevi Landau
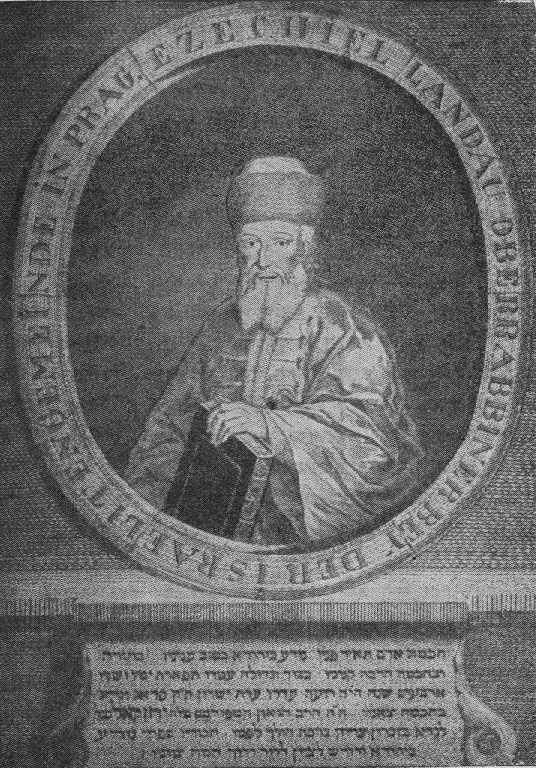

Personal life
- Born: 8 October 1713 Opatów, Poland
- Died: 29 April 1793 (aged 79) Prague, Bohemia, Holy Roman Empire

Religious life
- Religion: Judaism

Yechezkel ben Yehuda HaLevi Landau (8 October 1713 – 29 April 1793) was an influential authority in halakha (Jewish law). He is best known for the work Noda Biyhudah (נודע ביהודה), by which title he is also known.

== Biography ==
Landau was born in Opatów, Poland, to a family that traced its lineage back to Rashi, and attended yeshiva at Ludmir and Brody. In Brody, he was appointed dayan (rabbinical judge) in 1734.

In 1745 Landau became rabbi of Yampol. While in Yampol, he attempted to mediate between Jacob Emden and Jonathan Eybeschütz in a debate—"The Emden-Eybeschütz Controversy"—that "had disrupted Jewish communal life for many years". Emden had accused Eybeschuetz of being a crypto Sabbatean, primarily based on amulets Eybeschuetz had written, which Emden believed contained Sabbatean kabbalah. Landau proposed a compromise, in which all amulets allegedly written by Eybeschuetz would be hidden away, and Eybeschuetz would accept to refrain from producing any amulets in the future. Furthermore, all accusations against Eybeschuetz would stop, and no further polemics would be published. Landau's role in the Emden - Eybeschuetz controversy is described as "tactful" and brought him to the attention of the community of Prague—where, in 1755, he was appointed rabbi. He also established a yeshiva there; Avraham Danzig, author of Chayei Adam, is amongst his best known students.

Landau was highly esteemed not only by the community, but also by others; and he stood high in favor in government circles. Thus, in addition to his rabbinical tasks, he was able to intercede with the government on various occasions when anti-Semitic measures had been introduced. Though not opposed to secular knowledge, he objected to "that culture which came from Berlin", in particular Moses Mendelssohn's translation of the Pentateuch.

His son, Samuel Landau (1752 – 31 October 1834, Prague), was chief dayyan of Prague. Landau was the champion of Orthodox Rabbinism, and when, at the end of the eighteenth century, the Austrian emperor planned the establishment of Jewish theological seminaries, Landau was one of the rabbis that objected thereto. He had a controversy on this subject with Baruch Jeiteles (Phinehas Hananiah Argosi di Silva), who, under the title of Ha-Oreb, published (Vienna, 1795) Landau's letter to him and his own rejoinder. Landau published his responsa under the title of Shibat Ẓiyyon (Prague, 1827). He edited his father's Ahabat Ẓiyyon and Doresh le-Ẓiyyon (ib. 1827), adding to the former work four homilies of his own, and to the latter a number of halakic discourses. [Jewish Encyclopedia]

== Works ==
His main work of responsa, titled Noda Biyhudah (נודע ביהודה, "Known in Judah", a reference to Psalms 76:2 and his father's name), is one of the principal sources of Jewish law of his age. Famous decisions include those limiting autopsy to prevent a clear and present danger in known others. This collection was esteemed by rabbis and scholars, both for its logic and for its independence with regard to the rulings of other Acharonim as well as its simultaneous adherence to the writings of the Rishonim.

=== Other works ===
- Dagul Mervavah on the Shulkhan Arukh (cf. Song of Solomon 5:10)
- Tziyun le-Nefesh Chayah (abbreviated as Tzelach, named in reference to his mother, whose name was Chayah) on the Talmud.
- Drushei HaTzlach, a collection of sermons.
- Ahavas Tzion
- Doresh LeTzion

== Notable views ==
=== Returning to the Talmud ===
Landau was disturbed by the increasing influence of non-Talmudic sources on the Jewish community. He believed that many kabbalistic concepts were being understood in a heretical fashion, and was especially concerned with the prospect of the kabbalistic ideology of the Sabbatean movement infiltrating the populace. Landau frequently spoke against teaching Kabbalah to the masses, and was echoed in this regard by his student, Elazar Fleckeles, who praised the government for instituting laws limiting the study of kabbalah. In his responsa, when asked about matters that had no source in the Talmud, Landau would often respond, "it is not my way to study any issue which is not discussed in the Talmud". He responded in such a manner to inquiries about the ethical will of Rabbi Yehuda haChasid, which contains various instructions not found in the Talmud, a question about the proper manner of writing certain letters in the Torah scroll according to kabbalistic literature, and other similar questions.

=== Opinion on the Zohar ===
In his sefer Derushei HaTzlach, Landau argued that the Zohar can not be considered reliable, since it only came into the hands of the Jewish people many hundreds of years after Rashbi's death, and thus lacks an unbroken mesorah as to its authenticity, among other reasons.

=== Clashes with the haskalah movement ===
Landau condemned the haskalah movement in harsh terms. In numerous public sermons, he campaigned against the study of heretical philosophy. He particularly singled out Hartwig Wessely for criticism after the publication of the latter's Divrei Shalom V'emes, which advocated abandoning the traditional Jewish educational system, in favor of one with an emphasis on secular studies.

=== Opposition to Chasiddus ===
Landau was a staunch opponent of the nascent Hasidic movement. In one response, he writes "...In this generation of ours [people] have abandoned God’s Torah and the source of living waters–the two Talmuds, Bavli and Yerushalmi–to dig for themselves broken cisterns. And in the haughtiness of their hearts they exalt themselves; each one says "I am the one who sees, to me the gates to heaven have opened, and on my account the world is sustained". These [people] are the destroyers of the generation and of this orphaned generation I say that God's ways are just, and the righteous shall walk in them, and the Chasidim shall stumble in them [This is an alteration of Hoshea 14:14, in which the prophet says that sinners will stumble in them.]..."

=== Opposition to the Sabbatean movement ===
According to Sid Z. Leiman and Maoz Kahana, although Landau was extremely active in combating the Sabbatean movement, he believed the most effective means of eradicating it would be to aggressively counter overt Sabbateanism, while ignoring those Sabbateans who stayed hidden. Simultaneously, Landau sought to weaken the appeal of kabbalah (the study of which often lured people to the Sabbatean movement). Thus, Landau aimed to deprive the Sabbateans of any platform, and cause the Sabbatean movement to wither on its own. Besides the specific debate over the status of Jonathan Eybeschuetz, Jacob Emden expressed strong disagreement with Landau's approach, advocating instead for a far more aggressive anti Sabbatean strategy.

== See also ==
- Misnagdim
- Vilna Gaon
