= Rabbinically prohibited activities of Shabbat =

Activities prohibited on Shabbat by rabbinic decree

In Jewish religious law (halakha), Jews are commanded to rest on Shabbat, and refrain from performing certain types of work. Some of the activities are considered to be prohibited by biblical law (the 39 Melachot), while others became prohibited later on, due to rabbinic decrees. These rabbinic Shabbat prohibitions are collectively known as shevut (שבות).

The rabbinic prohibitions fall into several categories: activities not in the spirit of Shabbat; activities which closely resemble a forbidden activity; activities which could lead one to perform a prohibited activity; or activities whose biblical permissibility is debated, so avoiding the activity allows one to keep Shabbat according to all rabbinic opinions.

As with most areas of Halacha, Orthodox Jews tend to observe these prohibitions more stringently than non-Orthodox Jews.

== Muktzeh ==
Certain items may not be moved or eaten on Shabbat because they are classified as muktzeh (off-limits). Reasons for items being considered muktzeh include their main use being a violation of Shabbat, the act of moving them risking a Shabbat violation, or if they were produced during Shabbat in violation of Shabbat.

== Money ==
Although the use of money on Shabbat is not directly forbidden in the Torah, its use has long been condemned by the sages. Money is the very matter of business, and conducting or even discussing business on Shabbat is a rabbinically prohibited act. Additionally, many business transactions are customarily recorded on paper, and writing is one of the 39 melachot.

== Amirah L'akkum ==
It is rabbinically forbidden for a Jew to tell a non-Jew to do an activity forbidden on the Sabbath, regardless of whether the instruction was given on the Sabbath or beforehand. The reason is that otherwise, the sanctity of the Sabbath would be diminished, as any activity desired could be performed via proxy.

It is also forbidden to benefit on Sabbath from such an activity, regardless of whether the non-Jew was instructed to do so or not. However, if the non-Jew does an activity for himself, a Jew may benefit from it.

=== Exceptions ===
Both "instruct" and "benefit" are defined here strictly. This gives rise to the following leniency: One may hint a non-Jew to turn off a light interfering with one's sleep, since eliminating a nuisance (the light) is not considered a benefit. Hinting may be done, for example, by saying: "The light is on." Another example of a non-benefit is turning on a light if there already is a minimal amount of light present. This is because an increased ease of function is not considered a benefit.

When the activity desired is itself only rabbinically prohibited, it may be permitted to tell a non-Jew to perform the activity for important reasons, such as a communal benefit (such as a power outage in the synagogue) or a mitzvah (such as circumcision). This principle is known as shevut deshevut bimkom mitzvah. There are also leniencies in the event of a sick person, generally defined as an adult who is bound to bed due to the illness or discomfort among young children.

== Electricity ==
The use of electricity on Shabbat is generally considered forbidden among Orthodox Jews. There is extensive debate regarding the source of this prohibition. According to most opinions, the prohibition is rabbinic. (Some uses of electricity may also involve a biblical prohibition, for example incandescent light bulbs, or cooking on an electric stove.) Orthodox rabbis determined that turning on and off electric lights and appliances should be forbidden because the actions are too similar to the kindling or extinguishing of a flame which are two of the Shabbat prohibitions laid out by the Mishnah.
