= Shabbos goy =

Non-Jew assisting in a task on Sabbath

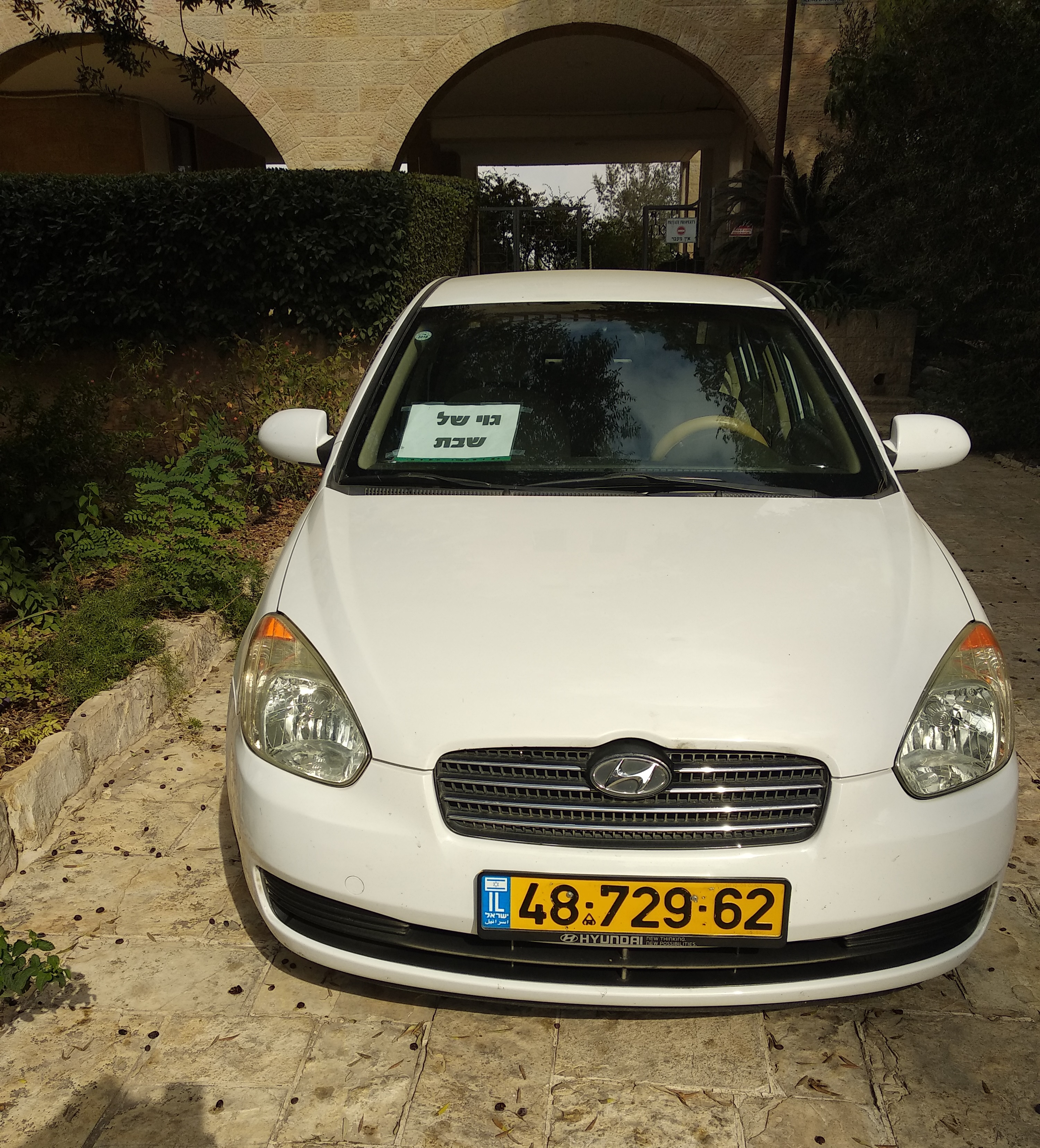
A car in Jerusalem with a sign in the window that reads "goy shel shabbat" in Hebrew

A Shabbos goy, Shabbat goy or Shabbes goy (Yiddish: שבת גוי; Hebrew: גוי של שבת, romanized: goy shel shabbat; plural Shabbos goyim) is a non-Jew who is employed by Jews to perform certain types of work (melakha) that Jewish religious law (halakha) prohibits a Jew from doing on the Shabbat.

== Etymology ==
The term is a combination of the words Shabbos (שבת), the term for Sabbath in Ashkenazi Jewish usage, and goy (גוי), a gentile or non-Jew. The word goy, which translates literally as "nation" in Biblical Hebrew, has over time acquired the meaning of someone who is not Jewish. In modern usage in English, the word goy is sometimes seen as derogatory, but this is a point of discussion in the Jewish community. According to Adi Ophir and Ishay Rosen-Zvi, this usage started to take place from the first and second century onwards. They argue that before this time, no crystallized dichotomy between Jew and non-Jew existed in Judaism.

== Description ==
On Shabbat, there are numerous restrictions and certain types of work are prohibited, such as construction work. The rabbis ruled that asking a non-Jew to violate Shabbat for oneself is generally forbidden, but under certain circumstances the rabbis allowed it, especially to heat the oven on winter days in northern countries. A shabbos goy is not needed where life is at stake (pikuach nefesh) or in the case where there would be a reasonable chance of danger to life (safek pikuach nefesh).

Originally, the job of the shabbos goy was often given to a poor woman, and the compensation was in the form of challah; later, money was given, although not on Shabbat or not directly given to the worker, due to halakhic restrictions on hiring workers on Shabbat.

According to Ronald J. Eisenberg, "Today the proliferation of electronic timers has virtually eliminated the need for the Shabbos goy, who once played an important role, especially in the shtetls of Eastern Europe."

== Notable examples ==
Notable examples of Shabbos goyim include Maxim Gorky, Thomas D'Alesandro Jr, Floyd B. Olson, Harry S. Truman, Pete Hamill, Colin Powell, Mario Cuomo, Martin Scorsese, Ralph Branca (who did not know at the time that he was Jewish), Tom Jones, and the adolescent Elvis Presley, all of whom served their Jewish neighbors in this way. Barack Obama served his Jewish office neighbor while serving in the Illinois Senate.
