= Chayei Adam =

Code of Jewish law written by Rabbi Avraham Danzig

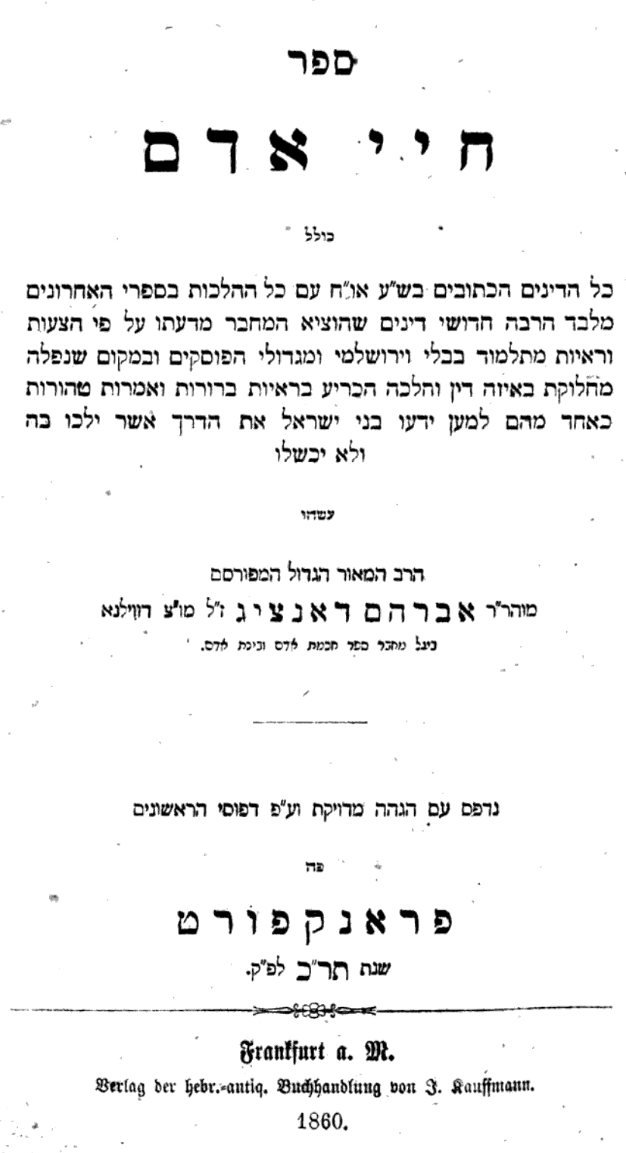
- Title page of 1860 publication of Chayei Adam by the J. Kauffmann Jewish Book Publisher and Book Distributer
- Author: Avraham Danzig
- Language: Hebrew
- Subject: Halakha
- Publication date: 1801
- Publication place: Poland

Chayei Adam (Hebrew: חיי אדם, lit. 'The Life of Man') is a work of Jewish law by Avraham Danzig (1748–1820), dealing with the laws discussed in the Orach Chayim section of the Shulchan Aruch. It is divided into 224 sections - 69 dealing with daily conduct and prayer, and 155 with Shabbos (Sabbath) and Yom Tov (holidays). It was initially published in 1801, and was published again in 1818 in the final years of Danzig's life.

Chayei Adam was intended primarily "for the cultured layman", as opposed to rabbinic scholars, and the work is thus presented in a readily accessible form. In many cities, societies were formed for the purpose of studying Chayei Adam.

In this work, Danzig collected and critically sifted the Acharonic material in the field of the Halakha written in the more than two and a half centuries since the appearance of the Shulchan Aruch. A parallel work Nishmas Adam, published together with Chayei Adam, discusses the halachic issues in greater depth. The two are usually printed together.

The scholarship of the work is evidenced by the fact that Chaim Volozhin, known for his opposition to "digests of halacha", granted the work his approbation (on condition that each section be cross-referenced to the Shulkhan Arukh to allow for further study). The rulings of the Chayei Adam are often cited in later works, especially the Mishnah Berurah.
