= Muktzeh =

Items that may not be moved during Shabbat or Yom Tov

Muktzeh (Note: also Muktzah, Muktza, Muktze, Muqtzeh, Muqtzah, Muqtza, Muqtze.) /mʊktzə/ (Hebrew: מוקצה "separated") is a concept in Jewish rabbinical law (Halakha). Muktzeh objects are subject to use restrictions on the Sabbath. The generally accepted view regarding these items is that they may be touched, though not moved, during Shabbat (the Jewish Sabbath) or Yom Tov (Jewish holiday). Some extend this prohibition to the actual handling of these items. Halakha defines various categories of objects or substances which are "set aside" on the Jewish Sabbath, as well as various permissible instances of moving these various muktzeh items. For example, one may not handle money, rocks, twigs, etc. on Shabbat, as these items are muktzeh.

The consensus among the halakhic authorities is that muktzeh is an issur d'rabbanan (a rabbinic prohibition), rather than a d'oreisa (biblical prohibition).

There are four main types of Muktzeh (items that are set aside and cannot be moved on Shabbat):

1. Kli SheMelachto LeIsur (כלי שמלאכתו לאיסור) – A tool whose defined use involves work forbidden on Shabbat (for example, a match).
2. Muktzeh Mechamat Chisaron Kis (מוקצה מחמת חסרון כיס) – An expensive item that requires careful handling and is set aside to avoid damage (for example, a piece of art).
3. Muktzeh Mechamat Gufo (מוקצה מחמת גופו) – An object that is not a tool and has no defined use on Shabbat (for example, a stone or a dead body).
4. Basis LeDavar HaAssur (בסיס לדבר האסור) – An item that is not Muktzeh in itself but serves as a base for another item that is considered Muktzeh Machmat Gufo (for example, a tray on which Shabbat candles are placed).

Additional types of Muktzeh:

- Muktzeh Machmat Mitzvah (מוקצה מחמת מצווה) – For example, during the festival of Sukkot, the wood and decorations of the sukkah.
- Muktzeh Machmat Mi'us (מוקצה מחמת מיאוס) – Items that are set aside due to their repulsive nature.
- Nolad (נולד) – Items that came into existence on Shabbat.
- Migo D'Itkatzei (מיגו דאתקצאי) – An item that was Muktzeh during twilight remains Muktzeh for the entire Shabbat.
- Muktzeh Machmat Isur SheBeGufo (מוקצה מחמת איסור שבגופו) – An item that is not a tool but is designated for forbidden work (for example, wool for spinning or wood for burning).
- Muktzeh Mishum D'chiyah B'yadayim (מוקצה משום דחייה בידיים) – For example, grapes that were placed on the roof before Shabbat to dry into raisins.
- Kli She'Melachto L'Heter (כלי שמלאכתו להיתר) – It is forbidden to move a tool whose primary use is permitted, without any need at all.

== General concept ==
Muktzeh is essentially a restriction on objects that were not 'prepared' before the Sabbath. The absence of preparedness in this sense means that when Shabbat began, the vast majority of people would not have expected to use this particular item or substance on Shabbat.

== Categories ==
There are six main categories of muktzeh, each one with different halakhic ramifications:

- Mechamat Chisaron Kis: delicate objects which one is extremely careful when handling; e.g. a musical instrument or camera.
- Basis: an object supporting a muktzeh item, which takes the same status as the muktzeh item; e.g. the tray holding the Shabbat candles.
- Mechamat Gufo: objects that are not utensils and have no ordinary Shabbat function; e.g. raw foods.
- Mechamat Isura: objects whose use is totally prohibited on Shabbat; at the start of Shabbat, they become muktzeh, remaining muktzeh until the end of Shabbat; e.g. Shabbat candles.
- Kli Shemlachto L'isur: objects designed primarily to perform forbidden work; e.g. a hammer.
- Mechamat Mitzvah: objects used only to perform a non-Shabbat mitzvah; e.g. a lulav.

== See also ==
- 39 Melakhot, the activities prohibited on Shabbat
