= List of Shabbat topics =

The following topics relate to Shabbat:

== Sabbaths ==
- Shabbat, Judaism's day of rest
- Motza'ei Shabbat, the night after Shabbat
- Special Shabbat, a day with special significance, including Shabbat Shuvah, Shirah, Shekalim, Zachor, Parah, HaChodesh, HaGadol, Chazon, Nachamu, Mevarchim, Chol HaMoed, Chol Hamoed Pesach, and Chol Hamoed Sukkot
- Ten Days of Repentance, including Shabbat Shuvah
- The Nine Days, including Shabbat Chazon
- Chol HaMoed, including Shabbat Chol HaMoed, Chol Hamoed Pesach, and Chol Hamoed Sukkot
- Shabbaton (Sabbatical), extra-celebratory Shabbat
- Shmita (Sabbatical year)
  - Jubilee (biblical)

== Shabbat law ==
- Category:Laws of Shabbat
- Activities prohibited on Shabbat
  - Rabbinically prohibited activities of Shabbat
- Conservative halakha
- Driving on Shabbat
- Electricity on Shabbat
- Eruv, a boundary used on Shabbat
- Eve of Passover on Shabbat
- Sabbath desecration

=== Shabbat technology ===
Category:Shabbat innovations

- Shabbat clock
- Shabbat elevator
- Shabbat lamp
- Shabbat microphone
- Sabbath mode
- Shabbat module

== Shabbat observances ==
- Amidah
- Havdalah, Shabbat closing service observed at Motzei Shabbat
- Jewish prayer services on Shabbat
- Maariv, Shabbat evening prayer
- Pesukei dezimra
- Shabbat candles, lit on Preparation Day evening prior to sunset
- Shalom, a Hebrew greeting on Shabbat
- Torah reading
  - Weekly Torah portion
  - Category:Weekly Torah readings
- Yotzer ohr
- Zemirot, Shabbat songs

== Shabbat food ==
- Shabbat meals
  - Seudah Shlishit, third Shabbat meal
- Category:Shabbat food
- Cholent
- Jewish cuisine
  - Cuisine of the Mizrahi Jews
  - Cuisine of the Sephardic Jews
- Kiddush, Shabbat blessing over wine
- Manna
- Sabbath food preparation

== Shabbat people ==
- Shabbos goy, non-Jew who performs activities permitted to him on the Jewish Shabbat
- Shabtai (given name)
- Shomer Shabbat, Shabbat-observant Jew
- Sons of Zadok

== Shabbat history ==
- Black Shabbat or Operation Agatha, a British police operation beginning Shabbat, June 29, 1946
- Kikar HaShabbat, an intersection in Jerusalem noted for Shabbat demonstrations
- Oyneg Shabbos, a Jewish ghetto documentary group active 1939-1943

== Shabbat writings ==
- Shabbat (Talmud), a tractate of the Talmud
- Shabbat B'Shabbato, a weekly leaflet
- Shemirat Shabbat Kehilchatah, a 20th-century work on the laws of Shabbat and Yom Tov
- Siddur, a prayerbook for daily or weekly use

== Shabbat categories ==
- Category:Shabbat
- Category:Shabbat prayers
- Category:Shacharit for Shabbat and Yom Tov
- Category:Weekly Torah readings

== General ==
- Convenience § Orthodox and Conservative Judaism
- Hebrew calendar
- Jewish greetings
- Jewish holidays
- Jewish symbolism
- Judaism
- List of Jewish prayers and blessings

== See also ==
- Biblical Sabbath
- Sabbath in Christianity
  - Sabbath in seventh-day churches
  - Sabbath economics, a Christian economic model
- Sabbatical
- Seven-day week
- Workweek and weekend
