= KosherSwitch =

Wall switch used during the Jewish Shabbat

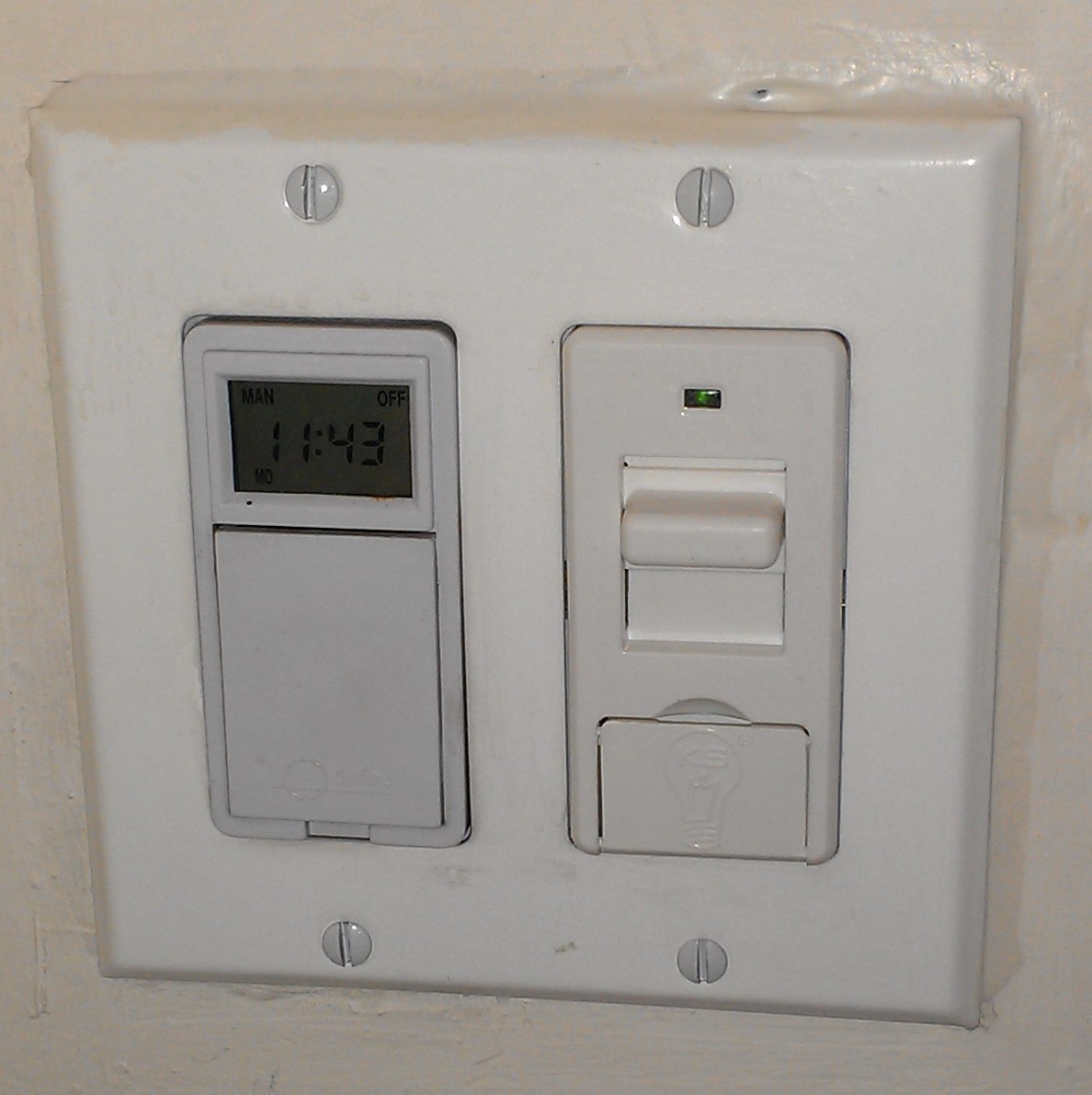
A KosherSwitch unit shown installed alongside a traditional Shabbos clock/timer. The switch is in Sabbath Mode, and may be used, since a green status light is visible.

The KosherSwitch (a.k.a. "Kosher Switch", "Shabbos switch", "Shabbat switch") is a wall switch marketed to the observant Jewish market and institutions servicing this market, as a means of controlling electricity on-demand on Shabbat and Jewish holidays in a manner that is permissible according to some Orthodox authorities, though some reject it. It is manufactured by KosherSwitch Technologies headquartered in New York City and was invented by Andy Menashe Kalati.

== Halakha of electricity on Shabbat ==
According to Orthodox halakhic authorities, the use of electricity on Shabbat is forbidden in most situations. Work-arounds include devices such as the Shabbos timer (since a person programs the timer before Shabbat, they are not doing a forbidden act on Shabbat), and the Kosher Lamp (where the lamp is constantly lit, but can be covered so no light is visible).

The KosherSwitch seeks to improve upon existing innovations by allowing light fixtures to be triggered on or off as needed by a person acting on Shabbat. According to the manufacturer, the switch is based upon "un-grama" (non grama). The basic idea is that the switch activates only sometimes, and only after a delay, making the action indirect and uncertain. Several Orthodox poskim have ruled as thus makes the device permissible for general consumer use. Others, however, have reached the opposite conclusion.

== Launch ==
In April 2015, the KosherSwitch group launched an Indiegogo crowdfunding campaign seeking to raise US$50,000 in support of their product. The campaign was successfully concluded with $70,715 total funding, and several thousand KosherSwitch units pre-ordered. Their launch video, featuring founder Andy Menashe Kalati, went viral among Jewish viewers and had received over half a million views within the first few days post-launch.

In October 2015, the company announced that all pre-orders had been shipped and that sales of the product would shift to retailers and Amazon.

== Debate and controversy ==
Shortly after the KosherSwitch launch on Indiegogo, fervent halakhic debate ensued. Many rabbis have issued rulings against use of the switch, or have ruled in favor of its use for exigent purposes only, while others continued to back its use for general consumer use. Yet others encouraged a less emotional and more calculated analysis of this invention.

The KosherSwitch group also faced allegations of misrepresenting rabbinic positions by doctoring their letters of endorsements and/or their endorsement videos. KosherSwitch group has denied this and stated that they present letters and videos unedited and in their entirety. In response KosherSwitch has accused several rabbis of spreading misinformation and blatant lies. Several rabbis who had initially endorsed or offered their blessings for the product later retracted their original endorsement. Those retractions have also been published by KosherSwitch on their website.

Adding to the confusion, in some cases these retractions seem self-contradictory, and such behavior has been decried by impartial bystanders.

- R. Rabbi Noach Isaac Oelbaum states in his original unedited video endorsement, “I have seen the KosherSwitch, which is produced by Reb Menashe Kalati, and have read the kuntres [collection of KosherSwitch responsa & endorsements]. And all of the detail which is mentioned in the kuntres, and as far as the switch has been demonstrated, it is clear that it is not a grama [not indirect causation]. Mi’tzad [with respect to] Hilchos Shabbos, there is no question of any melakha [forbidden act] being done by using that switch. Mi’tzad sheini [on the other hand] I recommend that anyone asks their own Rav to find out whether it is within the spirit of Shabbos, although there is no real melakha, but ask your own Rav regarding the actual, practical usage.” However, accusations of misrepresentation and wrong-doing followed: ‘Mrs. Helen Oelbaum, however, said that her husband [R. Oelbaum] never gave his stamp of approval to KosherSwitch. “He did not endorse it and they misrepresented what he said,” said Mrs. Oelbaum.’
- R. Chaim Tzvi Shapiro’s original endorsement responsum concludes, “Therefore, there is absolutely nothing forbidden relating to it, and not even Gram Kibuei [indirectly caused extinguishing], and it is permitted on Shabbos, l’chatchila [ab initio] according to all Halachic opinions, as was analyzed and clarified above.” However, his retraction claims that his endorsement was meant for exigent uses only.

== See also ==
- Activities prohibited on Shabbat#The thirty-nine creative activities
- Sabbath mode
- Shabbat clock
