= Shabbat pedestrian crossing =

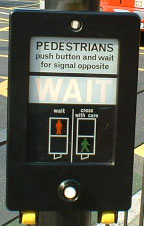
Orthodox Jews are forbidden to press electric buttons on Sabbath.

A Shabbat pedestrian crossing or hands-free pedestrian crossing is an automatically controlled device which allows Orthodox Jews to use pedestrian crossings on Shabbat.

The first such crossing is to be installed in the north London suburb of Finchley.

The need for such a device arises for Jews who observe Sabbath laws and are prohibited from operating electrical machinery. Instead of having to press an electric button to operate the crossing system, the traffic lights will automatically turn red giving a chance for pedestrians to cross.

The first such device is to be installed at one of London’s busiest junctions on the North Circular, Henlys Corner. A Transport for London spokesman said "This idea was suggested by the synagogue, whose members asked if it could be done. We thought about it and came to the conclusion that it could."

Similar arrangements also occur in other places. In Highland Park, New Jersey, pedestrian crossing lights cycle automatically on the Sabbath, though they are operated by buttons during the week.

== See also ==
- Electricity on Shabbat
- Shabbat elevator
