= Sholom Shuchat =

American rabbi

Rabbi Sholom Shuchat
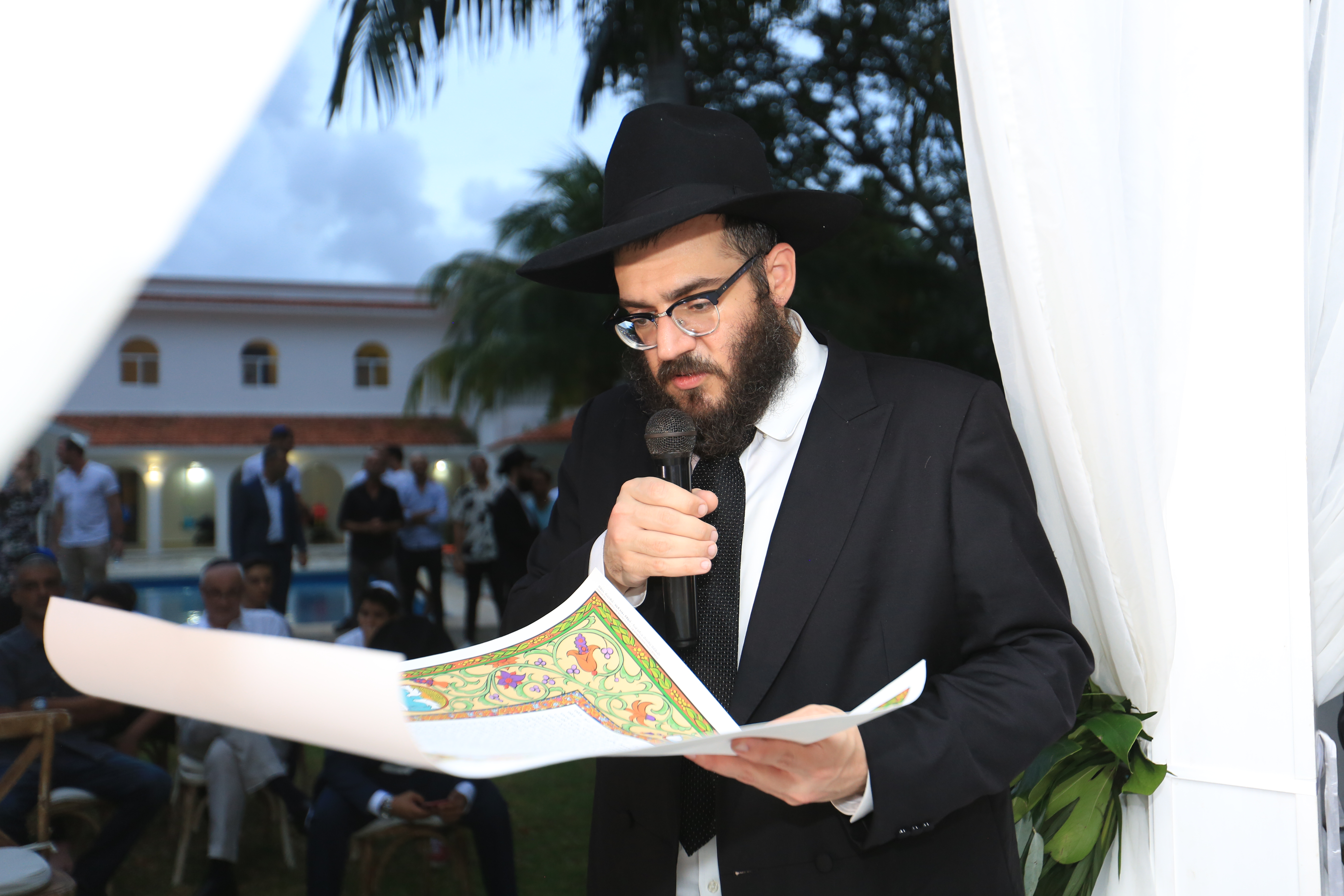
- Cozumel, Mexico 2019

Personal life
- Occupation: Dayan (rabbinic judge), Rosh kollel

Religious life
- Religion: Judaism
- Denomination: Chabad
- Semikhah: Zalman Nechemia Goldberg, David Lau, Yitzhak Yosef

Sholom Shuchat (Hebrew: שלום דוב בער שוחאט) is an American rabbi, rosh kollel, and dayan. In June 2014, Shuchat pleaded guilty to one count of traveling in interstate commerce to commit an act of violence as part of the New York divorce coercion gang.

== Education ==
In June 2004, Shuchat received his semikhah (rabbinic ordination) from Dovid Schochet (Chief Rabbi of Toronto) and Dovid Schmukler (dean of Kollel Tiferes Menachem in Los Angeles, California). He received dayanut in 2012 from Zalman Nechemia Goldberg, Aryeh Ralbag of the Union of Orthodox Rabbis, Yosef Feigelstock of Buenos Aires, and Yoram Ulman of Sydney, Australia.

== Rabbinic career ==
Shuchat is a dayan on the New York Bet Din (Chok Natan) in New York City. He is recognized by the Chief Rabbinate of Israel for performing gittin (Jewish divorce), kiddushin (Jewish marriage) and giyur (conversions). Since 2020, Shuchat serves as the rosh kollel of the Kollel L'horaah Maasit of Crown Heights, which teaches halakha (Jewish law) and its practical applications to aspiring rabbis. He, along with members of the kollel, viewed the pouring of the Bucks County mikveh (ritual bath) and another one in Loch Sheldrake, New York. Shuchat was the first Chabad rabbi to rule the Crown Heights eruv kosher. He is a member of the Union of Orthodox Rabbis of the United States and Canada, the Rabbinical Alliance of America, and the Coalition for Jewish Values. He is a member of the faculty of the Online Smicha rabbinical ordination program, the Havineni rabbinical ordination program and Online Machon rabbinical ordination program.

=== Edison divorce torture plot ===
In October 2013, Shuchat was implicated in the Edison divorce torture plot, a sting operation conducted by the Federal Bureau of Investigation, the goal of which was to bring about the arrests of a number of rabbis who plotted to abduct and torture a non-existent Jewish man in order to coerce him into issuing a get to his "wife". In June 2014, Shuchat pleaded guilty in New Jersey Federal Court to traveling in interstate commerce to commit an act of violence. In December 2015, he was sentenced to time served, along with two years of supervised release, with the first six months being house arrest.

=== Lectures ===
Shuchat was a featured speaker at the 2019 Kinus Torah in the Chabad Lubavitch World Headquarters and has spoken at other rabbinic conferences and events. In 2015, he gave lectures opposing the halakhic prenup and the KosherSwitch.

=== Writing ===
After a second measles outbreak in the Orthodox Jewish community in Brooklyn in 2014, Shuchat wrote an article berating the anti-vaxxers, stating "When someone does an action which can cause death, or even refuses to do an action which can prevent death, he is compared to a murderer". In April 2014, he wrote an explainer about Pesach stringencies. Shuchat reviewed Chaim Miller's book Turning Judaism Outwards: A Biography of the Rebbe Menachem Mendel Schneerson in mid-June 2014, alleging inaccuracies in the book. In 2015, he edited a collection of Menachem Mendel Schneerson's directives to Chabad emissaries, Shlichos K'hilchasa. In 2017, he wrote a letter opposing TahorApp, a mobile app whose intended purpose was to enable women to discreetly and privately send niddah questions to a rabbi. In the same year, he joined a group of Chabad rabbis who signed a proclamation addressing child sexual abuse cases in Brooklyn's Haredi community. Shuchat wrote a reponsum, later published in various rabbinical journals, defending Manhattan Beer Distributors against accusations it had improperly kept chametz over Passover. In the fall of 2018, he campaigned against the International Beit Din, charging it had allowed a married woman to remarry without first obtaining a get, rendering any future children mamzerim (bastards/impure).
