= Shabbos (disambiguation) =

Shabbos is an alternative name for Shabbat.

Shabbos may also refer to:

- Shabbos App, a purported app to enable the use of smartphones on the Sabbath
- Shabbos Kestenbaum, American Jewish activist
- Shabbos Negmatulloev, Tajikistani boxer
