= Zman Switch =

The ZMAN Switch is a patented specialized Shabbos clock marketed to the observant Jewish market. Unlike a traditional timer, it contains a pre-programmed Jewish calendar through the year 2050, so that the consumer does not need to readjust the programming for sunset times or Jewish holidays throughout the year. It is manufactured by ZMAN Technologies located in New Jersey and invented by Yonason Bloch and Herbert Klein.

== See also ==
- Electricity on Shabbat
- 39 categories of activity prohibited on Shabbat
- Shabbat clock
