= Shabbos App =

2014 hoax

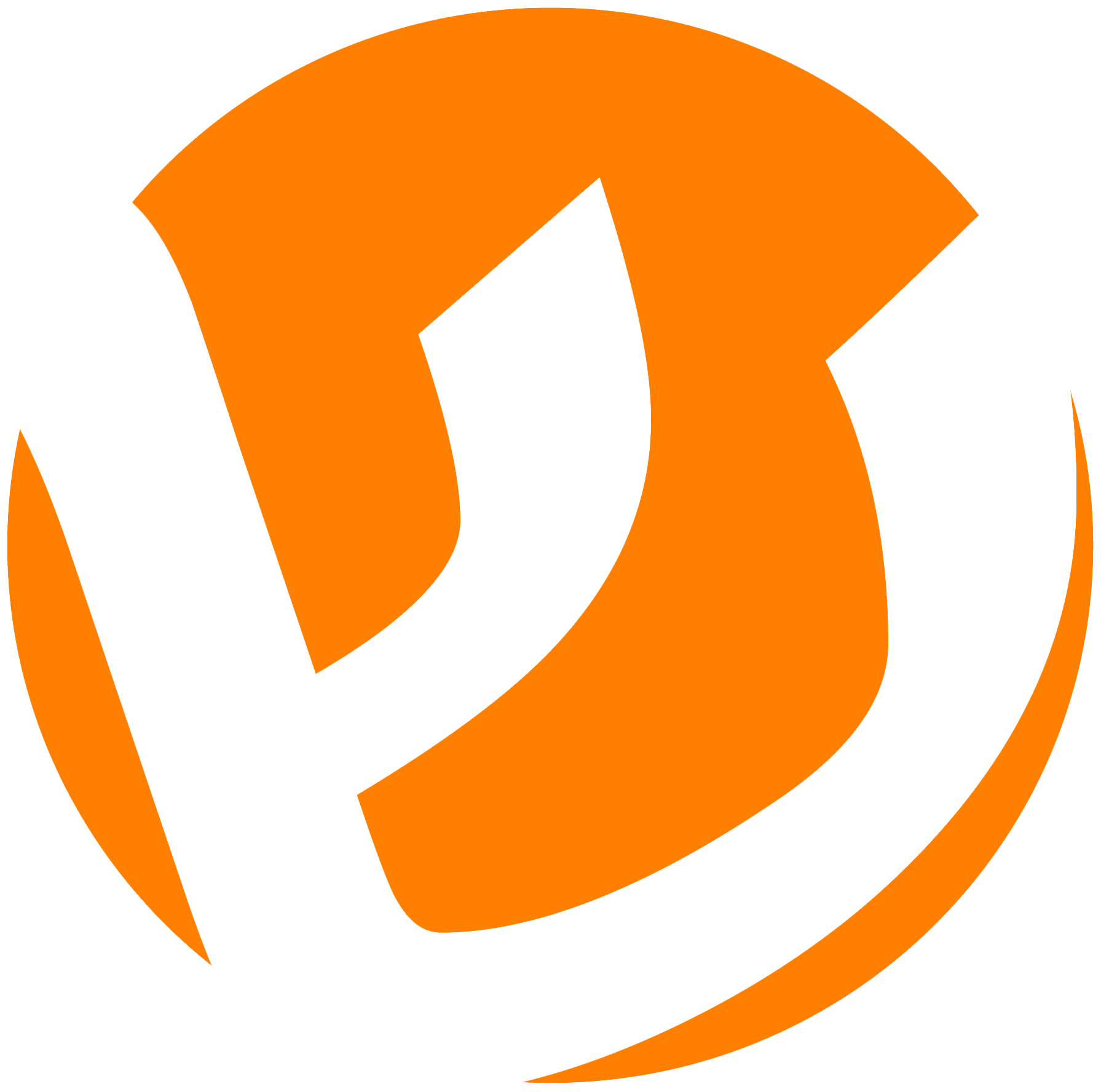
- Shabbos App logo, featuring a "Shin" for the Sabbath
- Developers: YidTec, Inc.
- Platform: Android
- Website: http://shabbosapp.com, archived from the original 2015-09-20

The Shabbos App claimed to be a proposed Android app to enable Orthodox Jews, and Jewish Sabbath-observers, to use a smartphone on the Sabbath. The app was supposed to appear in late 2014. Some argued from the outset that this project was nothing more than an elaborate hoax or prank.

== Development ==
A team of ten software developers at YidTec, Inc., including Yossi Goldstein, Yitz Appel, Yehuda Levi, and other programmers, were working on the app.

On October 22, 2014, its developers stated on the Shabbos App website that they were planning to release the app with full functionality on December 1, 2014, on Google Play. In this announcement, the developers also stated that the application is legitimate and not a hoax or a joke. The developers announced on November 16 that they were running behind schedule.

== Purpose and function ==
Under Jewish law, as interpreted by mainstream Orthodox Jewish rabbis, Jews are not allowed to work on the Sabbath, which is a day of rest, and Orthodox Jews do not turn electricity on or off on the Sabbath. An exception to these prohibitions is those situations that involve saving lives.

The developers said that the Shabbos App was built in a manner that avoids and resolves the Jewish law problems related to using a smartphone by texting on the Sabbath, allowing observant Jews to text on the Sabbath.

They also said the screen stays lit for the entire day, texts can be automatically deleted, and an indicator lights green when plugging in the phone will not immediately trigger charging it.

== Controversy ==
The app was controversial in some Orthodox Jewish circles.

Rabbi Moshe Elefant of the Orthodox Union and Rabbi Yair Hoffman both spoke out against the app. The Orthodox Union ran two opinion pieces against the app as well as another piece by Rabbi Ari Kahn which was also run by Aish.com. Rabbi Dr. Raphael Zarum, Dean of the London School of Jewish Studies wrote that the Shabbos App developers:

"have found solutions to the halachic challenges of typing-writing, screen illumination, sound generation and battery drainage and charging.... I have no doubt that all major halachic authorities will come out against this, except for use in emergency situations. However, the real issue will be how many people, despite their rabbis, will download this new app, open it weekly and feel a bit less guilty about their Shabbat phone habits."

Elie Klein said the Jewish community should use the app's introduction as an opportunity to examine how the meaning of Shabbat is being communicated to the next generation. Another commentator focused on the benefit of just disconnecting for a few hours, rather than using the app.

Rabbi Yaakov Menken wrote in early October 2014 that while it was true the Shabbos App had attracted a great deal of attention and discussion, he was pretty sure the app is a hoax, "designed to make Orthodox Jews look bad by demonstrating their focus on … what, precisely, I’m not sure ..." intended to "mock attempts by serious, committed Jews to face the new challenges presented by modern technology".

According to one of the developers, several rabbis are on board with the project whom the developer described in September 2014 as "Orthodox and knowledgeable in Torah and halacha", though he declined to name them. Rabbi Steve Bar-Yaakov Gindi, a long-time rabbi who received ordination from the Chief Rabbinate of Israel and administers a Jewish educational website, notes that laws for observing the Jewish Sabbath have changed slightly over time to accommodate technological developments. He noted: "Today, there are security cameras everywhere, and no rabbis forbid walking in front of them. That is a good example of how halacha has adjusted, in a perfectly legitimate way, to answer the needs of society using a new technology. To my mind, this is very similar." Others explain that there is specific halachic leniencies that are applicable in such a scenario (ccvc cameras), in most instances, and are not at all a product of 'adjustment to the times'.

Facebook pages were created both in favor of and against the app. Jewish Business News listed it as # 2 in its article "Top 20 Tech Stories of 2014 With Jews in Them".

== See also ==
- Activities prohibited on Shabbat
- Electricity on Shabbat § Computers and similar appliances
- Rabbinically prohibited activities of Shabbat
- Shomer Shabbat
