= Isaac Judah Schmelkes =

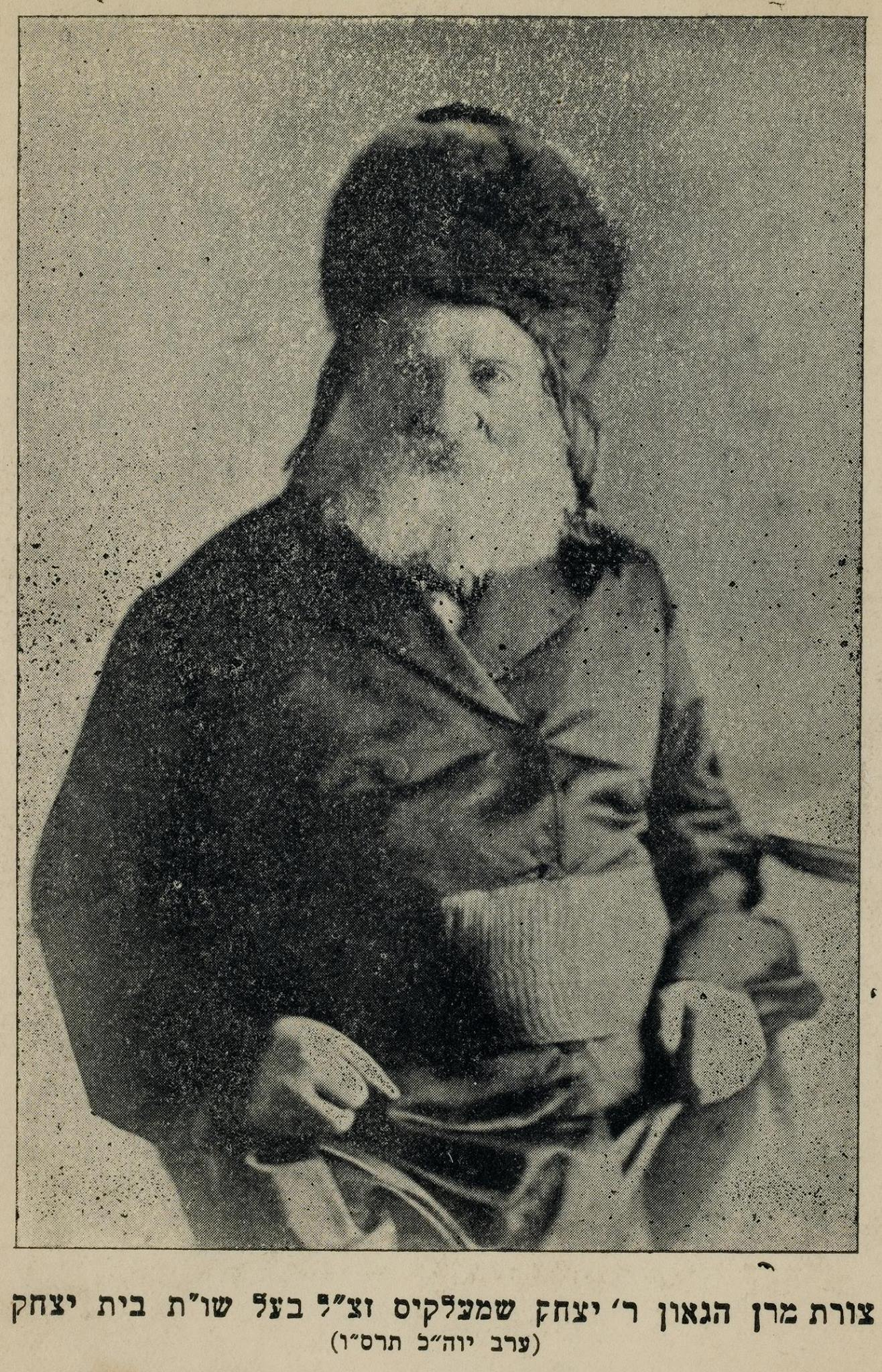
Portrait of Rabbi Yitsḥak Yehudah Schmelkes (1827–1905)

Rabbi Yitsḥak Yehudah Schmelkes (1827–1905), a talmudic scholar of Galicia, was born in Lemberg (Lviv, Ukraine), the son of Ḥayyim Samuel Schmelkes, claiming descent from Eleazar b. Samuel Schmelke Rokeaḥ. He was the head of the rabbinical court in Lviv from 1869-1893. His Beit Yiẓḥak (6 vols., 1875–1908), on the four parts of the Shulḥan Arukh, was widely acclaimed. His opinion on halakhic questions was sought by many prominent contemporary scholars.

== Biography ==
A pupil of Joseph Saul ha-Levi Nathanson, head of the local bet din, Schmelkes was hailed in his youth as a brilliant talmudic student. He served as head of the bet din in a number of towns before being appointed in Lemberg, where he remained until his death.

== Intellectual Property ==
Dating back to 1518 with the invention of the printing press, rabbinic authorities have issued exclusive printing privileges. These privileges typically grant the printer an exclusive right to print the book for a period of ten to twenty years or until the first edition has been sold—a time suitable for the author or heirs to have recovered their investment in preparing the manuscript for publication. In the 19th century, after the introduction of copyright in contemporary secular law, rabbinic authorities argued over the application of copyright in Jewish law. According to Schmelkes' teacher Rabbi Nathanson, a copyright was a property right arising out of the right of ownership. Schmelkes argued that an author’s exclusive right to publish their manuscript derived from the author's copyright in secular law, not from the author's property right in controlling access to the physical manuscript. Rabbi Schmelkes position is held by the majority in contemporary arguments over intellectual property in rabbinic law.

== Electricity on Shabbat ==
For appliances that do not produce light on Shabbat, turning on an electric current may violate other prohibitions in rabbinic Jewish law. For example, the Talmud prohibits the creation of a fragrant scent in one's clothing on Shabbat because, according to Rashi "creating anything new" is prohibited under a Rabbinic category called molid. Rabbi Schmelkes suggested applying molid to the generating of electric current.
