= Sabbath mode =

Feature in home appliances

Sabbath mode, also known as Shabbos mode (Ashkenazi pronunciation) or Shabbat mode, is a feature of some modern home appliances, including ovens, dishwashers, and refrigerators, which is intended to allow the appliances to be used (subject to various constraints) by Shabbat-observant Jews on the Shabbat and Jewish holidays. The mode usually overrides the usual, everyday operation of the electrical appliance and makes the operation of the appliance comply with the rules of Halakha (Jewish law).

== Background ==
Halakha forbids Jews from doing "work that creates" on Shabbat. Some observant Jews interpret this to include various activities including making a fire, preparing food, or even closing a switch or pressing an electronic button. A range of solutions has been created for those who need to use electronic (or electronic-controlled) devices on the Shabbat, including a special "Sabbath mode" for otherwise standard appliances.

By 1989, the Jerusalem-based Institute for Science and Halacha had developed devices intended to reconcile modern technology with Shabbat observance, including timers controlling household lighting, heating, and hot-water systems, as well as an emergency telephone designed for medical use.

== Appliances ==
=== Oven ===
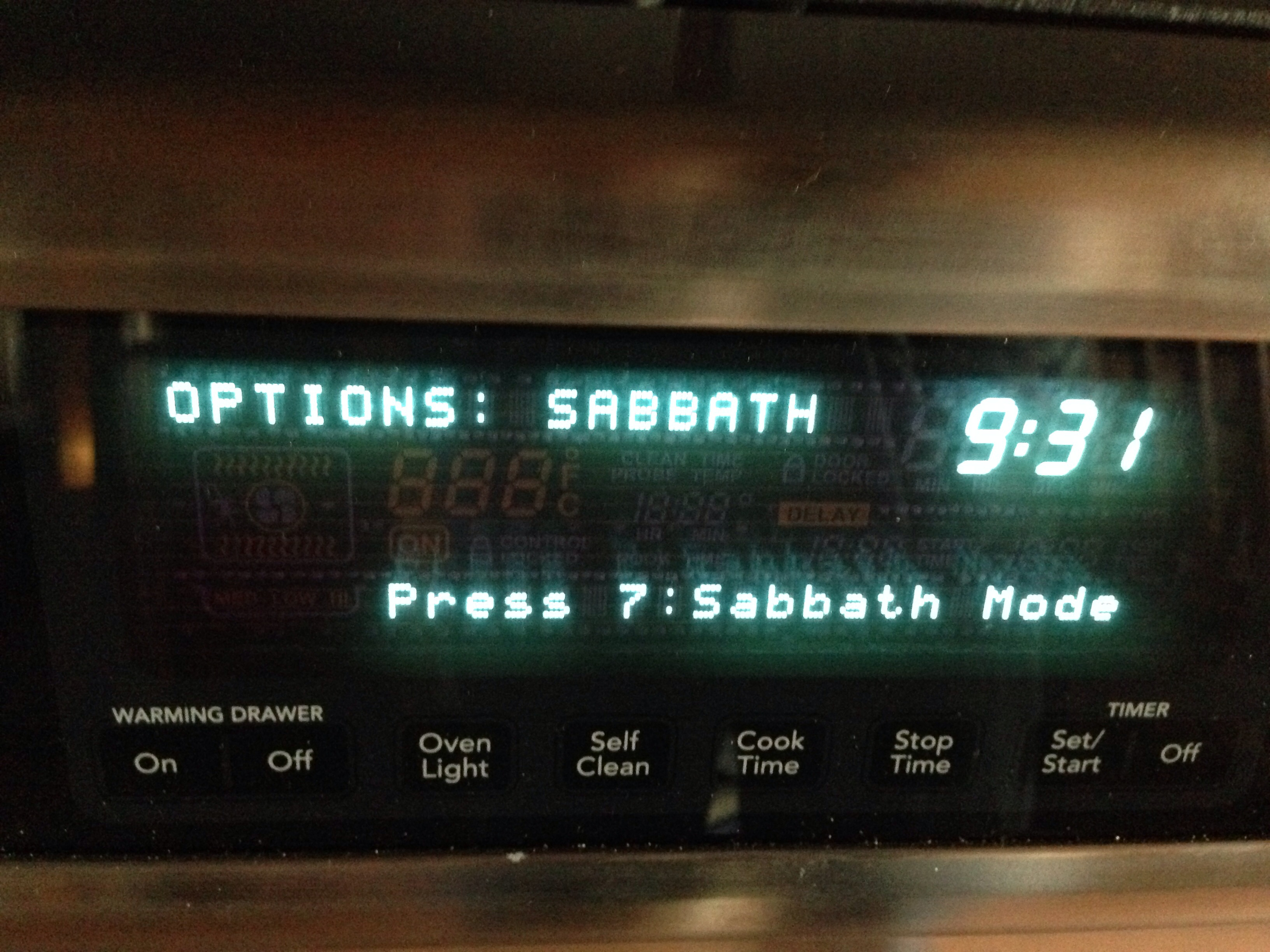
Oven with Sabbath mode

While according to Halakha, raw food may not be cooked on the Shabbat, food that was already cooked beforehand may be kept warm until mealtime. In the past, the Sabbath-observant would leave their food heating on the stove where it had been covered with a blech (metal sheet), or in the oven in which it had been cooked before the onset of Sabbath. Contemporary consumers seek to use their kitchen's oven to keep food hot for Sabbath consumption but must be assured that in opening the door to retrieve food, no Sabbath laws will be inadvertently contravened. An example of this would be ovens which are programmed to remove power from their heating element when the door is opened – use of this oven would not be possible on the Sabbath without making modifications.

On weekday holidays (Yom Tov), food may be cooked, but turning the heat on is prohibited. On these festive days, the domestic needs of the Sabbath observant consumer may require that their oven be heated over as much as 72 hours to allow for cooking during the festival. In the past, one would simply light a stove or oven before the festival began, and its heat was used over the coming days. In recent decades, however, appliance manufacturers have instituted safety features that present a challenge to festival use. One typical challenge is the auto-shut-off which automatically shuts off the heat after a predetermined number of hours.

For an appliance to be compliant with religious requirements when Shabbat mode is operating, the standard six- or twelve-hour automatic shutoff should be overridden, and all lights and displays (for example, a light that might go on when the door is opened) should be disabled. However, several manufacturers have not dealt with the issues caused by the heating elements and the thermostats, which in some Sabbath modes continue to operate as normal, which is in contradiction to normative halachic opinion. Some models do not even take care of the issue of the lights.

In more recently designed ovens, Shabbat mode will often feature the ability to adjust the temperature of the oven without any feedback to the operator of the oven. According to the prevailing Orthodox opinion and the minority Conservative view, this is not relevant to the Shabbat, but is useful on some holidays, when adjusting the heat is allowed, but changing a digital readout on the control panel is not.

With some Shabbat mode ovens that are controlled using a keypad to set the temperature, there is a random delay triggered after a button is pressed before the temperature change takes place.

In June 2008, nine Haredi poskim signed a public pronouncement (Kol Kore) stating that it was forbidden to raise or lower the temperature by reprogramming on Yom Tov using the Star-K Kosher Certification approved Shabbat Mode feature. The pronouncement referred to the differing opinion of Rabbi Moshe Heinemann (although without explicitly mentioning Rabbi Heinemann by name) as a minority opinion (Da'as Yachid) that should not be relied upon. However, Rabbi Heinemann said that he continued to stand by his opinion that it is permissible.

=== Refrigerator ===
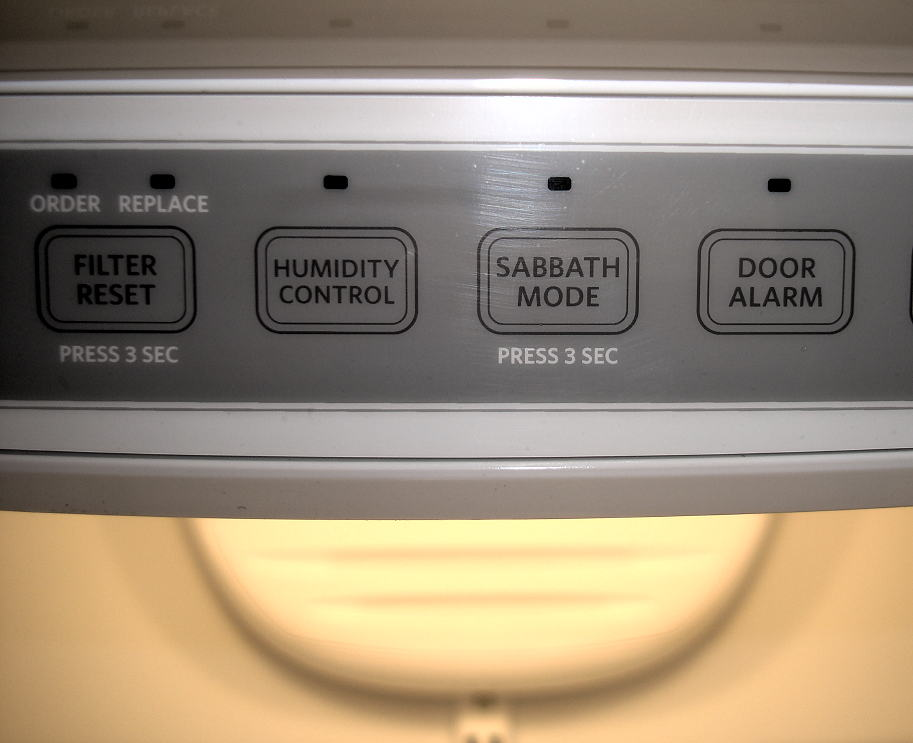
A refrigerator displaying the Sabbath Mode

A Shabbat mode refrigerator includes, at a minimum, the ability to disable all lights or other electrical activity from occurring when the refrigerator door is opened. Some Shabbat mode refrigerators include a timer for the compressor so that opening the door, which would normally indirectly cause the compressor to turn on as soon as the temperature rises, will have no immediate effect on the electrical operation of the appliance. Other refrigerators have their automatic functions removed. So, the user doesn't turn on the light when they open their fridge, making the Shabbat mode refrigerator okay to use on Shabbat.

=== Lamp ===
A Shabbat lamp is a special lamp that has movable parts to expose or block out its light so it can be turned "on" or "off" while its power physically remains on.

== See also ==
- 39 categories of activity prohibited on Shabbat
- Blech – a metal sheet used to cover a stovetop on Shabbat.
- Cholent – a long-simmered stew often eaten for lunch on Shabbat.
- Grama (halacha) – something that was caused by something else but whose outcome is not guaranteed.
- Shabbat elevator – an elevator with an automatic mode to allow observers to abstain from operating electric switches on Shabbat.
