= Jewish Business News =

- Type: online newspaper
- Founder: Sima Ella
- Editor: Sima Ella
- Founded: 2013
- Language: English
- Website: jewishbusinessnews.com

Jewish Business News is an online newspaper published in English, which primarily covers stories relating to businesses owned, or managed, by Jewish business people around the world, as is implied by the paper's nameplate. The newspaper launched in February 2013. Its founder, CEO and Editor-in-chief is Sima Ella, who was formerly a journalist at the Israeli newspaper Yedioth Ahronoth.

== Overview ==
The newspaper primarily covers international news stories relating to Jewish business leaders, inspiring companies, innovative startups, breakthrough researches, new technologies, legal cases, and questions of corporate law. Topics and stories directly or indirectly almost all possessing somewhere a significant Jewish dimension.

Jewish Business News offers occasional economic views and other contributions from Nobel Prize laureates in economics (Joseph Stiglitz, Robert Shiller) and other academics (Nouriel Roubini, Barry Eichengreen etc.). It also has a long relationship with Israel's largest business newspaper, Globes, whereby selected English language items from Globes are chosen by Jewish Business News and re-published. Information from Jewish Business News is often cited by other news sites.
