= Manhattan Beer Distributors =

Manhattan Beer Distributors is a New York–based beverage company. Manhattan Beer Distributors is the fourth largest beverage distributor in the United States, and the largest single market beer distributor in the country.

== History ==
The firm was founded in 1978 in Bronx, New York, by Simon Bergson, still its current President and CEO. It initially operated as a home distributor of beer. Bergson soon obtained the rights to distribute Carling Black Label and Tuborg, and operated out of a 4000 square foot warehouse with 3 delivery trucks. Currently, Manhattan Beer Distributors distributes over 45 million cases of beverages per year in the 5 boroughs of New York, its suburbs, and 9 other counties.

== Services offered ==
Manhattan Beer Distributors primary business is distribution of alcoholic beverages such as beer, wine products, and ciders, as well as non-alcoholic beverages such as water. The firm is the authorized distributor of hundreds of beverages.

== Environmental initiatives ==
The firm has a fleet of over 500 trucks, and has undertaken an initiative to re power 90% of those trucks to run on compressed natural gas. The distributor received $1.6 million in funding from the New York State Energy Research and Development Authority (NYSERDA) to offset the costs of the conversion, and contributed of $4.6 million of its own money. The goal of the program is to displace approximately 20 tons of Nitrous Oxides (NOx), 10 tons of Hydrocarbons (HC), 200 tons of Carbon Monoxide (CO), and 2 tons of Particulate Matter (PM) over the life of the vehicles, as well as reducing maintenance costs.
