= Pesik reisha =

In Halacha (Jewish law) a reisha (Lit. cutting off the head) is an action that ordinarily would be permitted but which will definitely cause an unintended prohibited side effect. A classic case of a reisha found in the Talmud is opening a door next to a candle on Shabbos (the Jewish Sabbath) where the candle will definitely be blown out.
