= Grama (halacha) =

Halachic concept

A grama (Talmudic Aramaic: גרמא) in Halacha (Jewish law) is something that was indirectly caused by something else but which outcome is not guaranteed.

A classic example is of vases that are filled with water and put around a fire in order to extinguish it. This is allowed on Shabbat because it is indirect and because the fire might not extinguish.

== In civil law ==
There is a rule that grama benizakin patur. If somebody caused financial harm to somebody else via an action that was not guaranteed to harm them, the person cannot be forced by a court to pay, although he might be morally obligated to.

== On Shabbat ==
An action which indirectly causes a Shabbat violation due to grama has a lower level of prohibition than an action which violates Shabbat directly. In situations of great need, a grama violation can be permitted.

Based on this, a variety of electrical devices have been developed which violate Shabbat only through grama, and thus can be used in situations of great need, for example in health care or security.

== See also ==
- Shabbat mode
- Pikuach nefesh
- Shinuy
