= Shabbat elevator =

Elevator that satisfies Jewish law

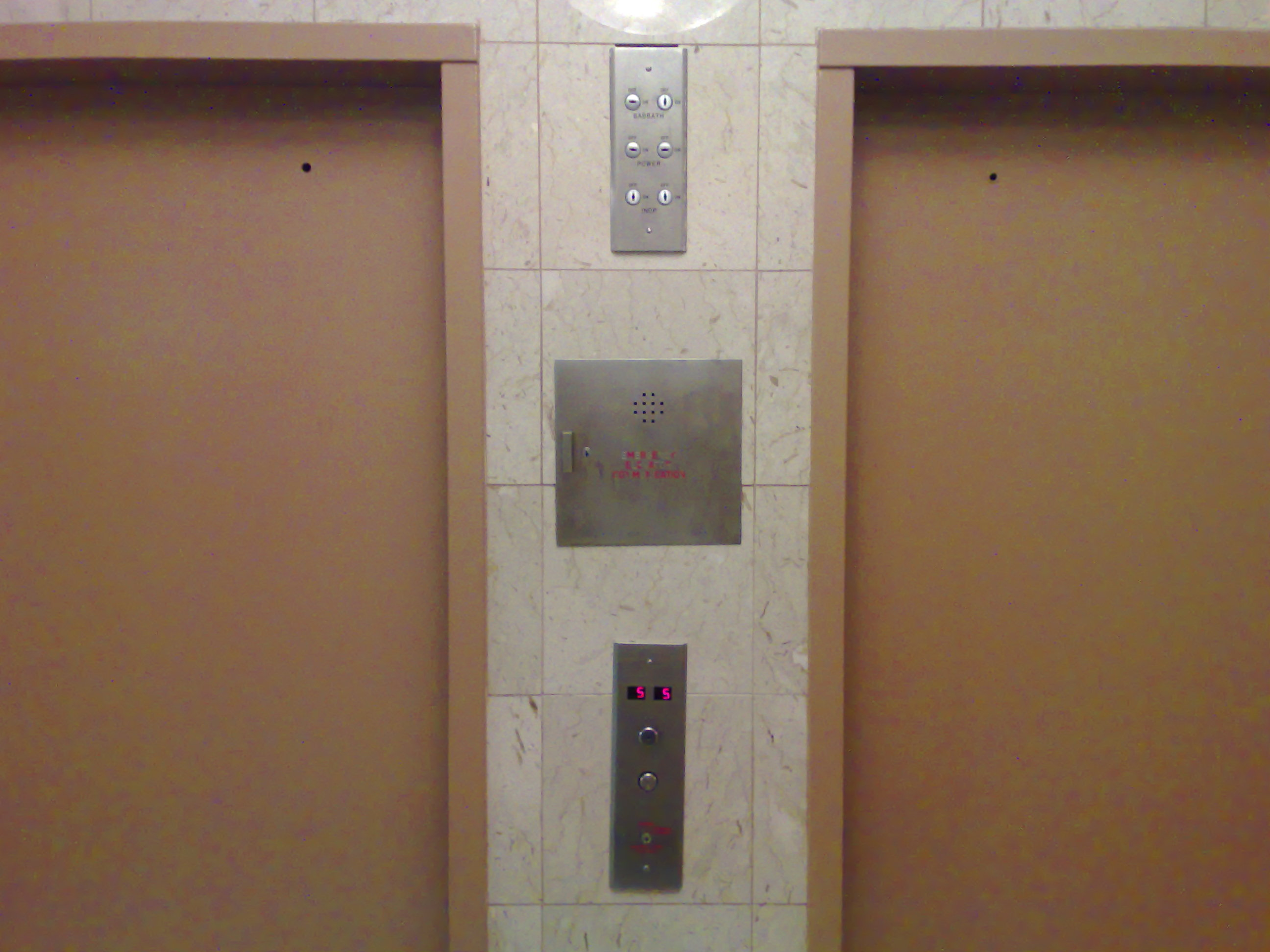
Shabbat elevators

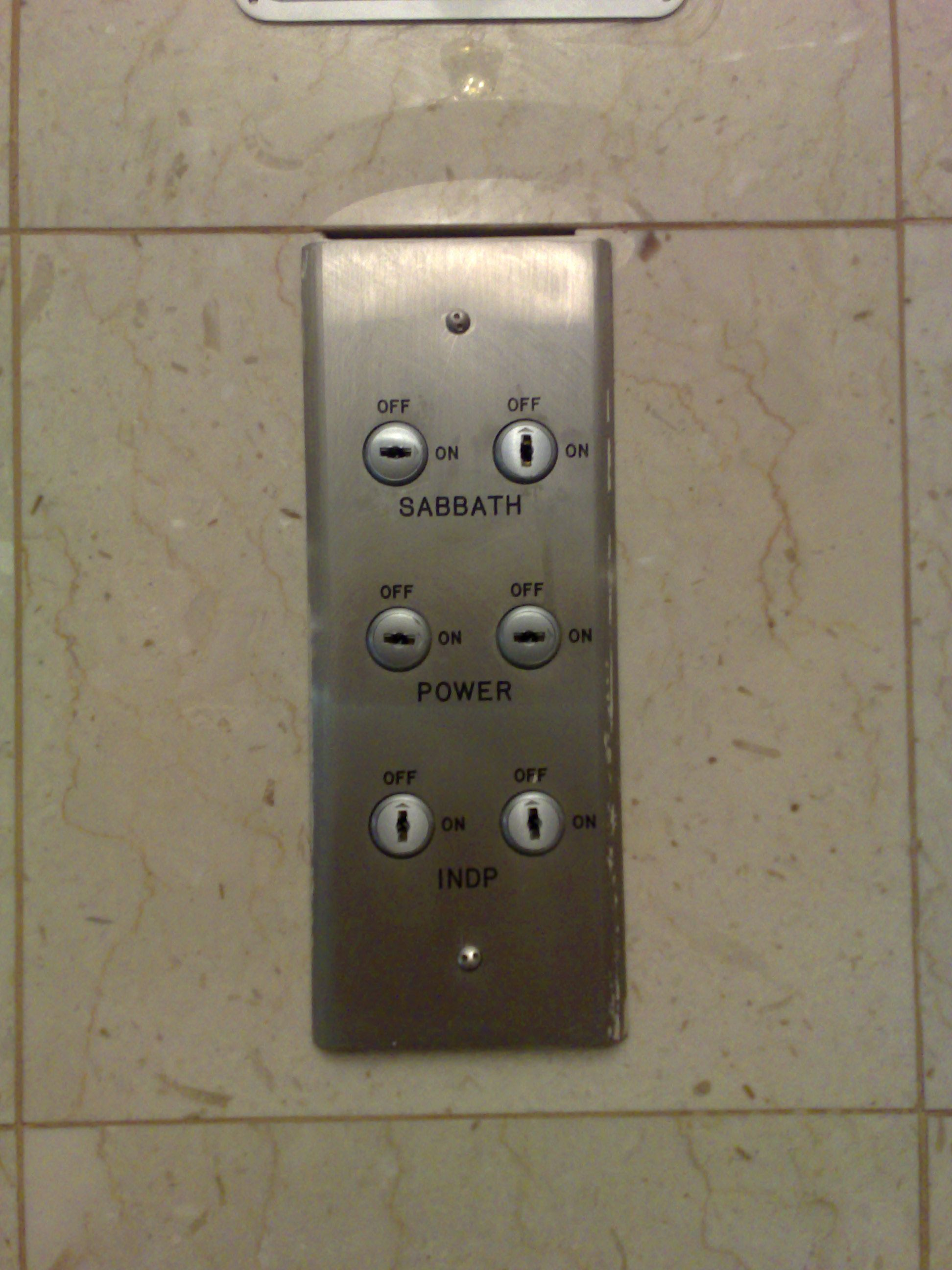
Shabbat elevator switches

A Shabbat elevator is an elevator which works in a special mode, operating automatically, to satisfy the Jewish religious law requiring Jews to abstain from operating electrical switches on Shabbat. These are also known as Sabbath elevators or Shabbos elevators.

== Description and history ==
Jewish law forbids those who observe it from undertaking various forms of "work" on the Sabbath, including that they may not create sparks or fires. In recent times, this has been extrapolated to also cover the operation of electrical lights and other appliances.

An elevator may be marked with a sign noting that it is specially configured for Shabbat observance. A Shabbat elevator typically stops at every floor without requiring its passengers to push buttons, which would violate Shabbat observance; however, some rabbinical scholars object to the use of Shabbat elevators as halachically problematic on other grounds.

Shabbat elevators can be found in areas of large Jewish population such as in Israel, the United States, Canada, Australia, Ukraine, Argentina, and Brazil. They are found in hotels, hospitals and other health institutions, apartment buildings, and sometimes in synagogues.

The Israeli Knesset in 2001 passed a Shabbat elevator law ordering that in all future construction of residential and public buildings which will have more than one elevator, one elevator must have a Sabbath mode. In this mode, the elevator will stop automatically at every floor, allowing people to step in and out without having to press any buttons.

In 2009, a number of Israeli Haredi rabbis, led by Rabbi Yosef Shalom Elyashiv and including Rabbi Nissim Karelitz, Rabbi Chaim Kanievsky, and Rabbi Shmuel Wosner, published a religious injunction forbidding the use of Shabbat elevators. This opinion was criticized by Rabbi Yisrael Rosen, Orthodox rabbi and founder of the Israeli Tzomet Institue for Halacha and Technology, as being contrary to the earlier authoritative ruling of Rabbi Shlomo Zalman Auerbach.

Some interpreters believe that a non-Jew known as a "Shabbos goy" may not be employed to press the buttons and hold the door for Jews in buildings that do not have Shabbat elevators, unless the Jew has great difficulty using the stairs themselves. As discussed in that article, a non-Jew is not expected to keep the Sabbath like a Jew. Therefore, Jewish law holds that a Jew may benefit from work performed by a non-Jew only if the non-Jew performs this work for his own good and of his own free will.

A borderline case is when a Jew hints to a non-Jew that they would like them to perform a certain service without explicitly asking. These borderline cases are not considered legitimate by many Orthodox rabbis.

== See also ==
- 39 categories of activity prohibited on Shabbat
- Electricity on Shabbat
- Driving on Shabbat
- Paternoster elevator

== Bibliography ==
- Bannett, D. R. The Sabbath Elevator Question, Elevators and Shabbat, The Institute for Science and Halacha.
- Halperin, Levi Yitzchak; Oratz, Dovid (1993). Shabbat and Electricity. Institute for Science and Halacha. ISBN 9780873066440.
- Dundes, Alan (2002). The Shabbat Elevator and other Sabbath Subterfuges: An Unorthodox Essay on Circumventing Custom and Jewish Character. Rowman & Littlefield Publishers. ISBN 9781461645603.
