= Shabbat lamp =

Electric light used during the Jewish Shabbat

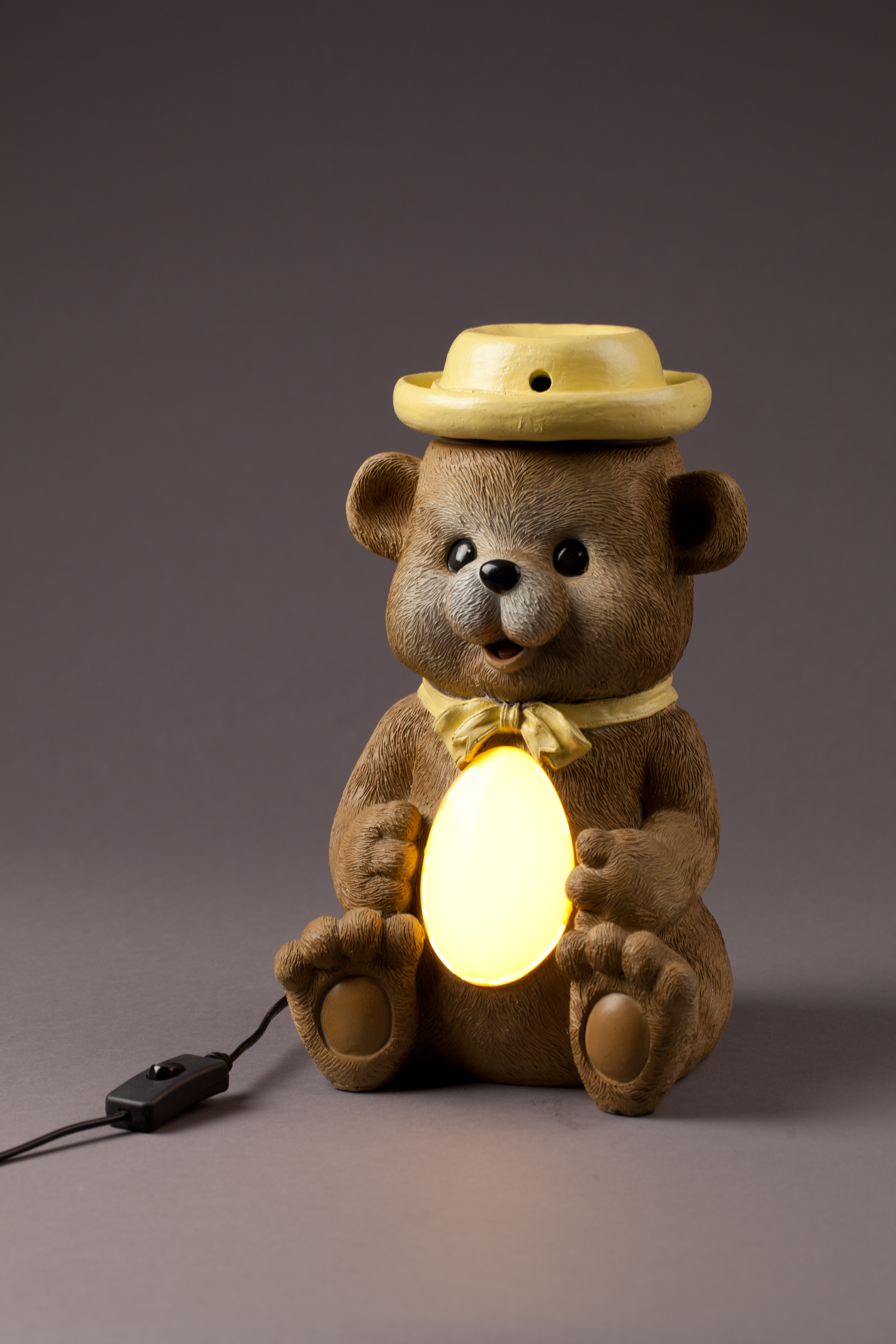
Teddy bear lamp, Jewish Museum of Switzerland

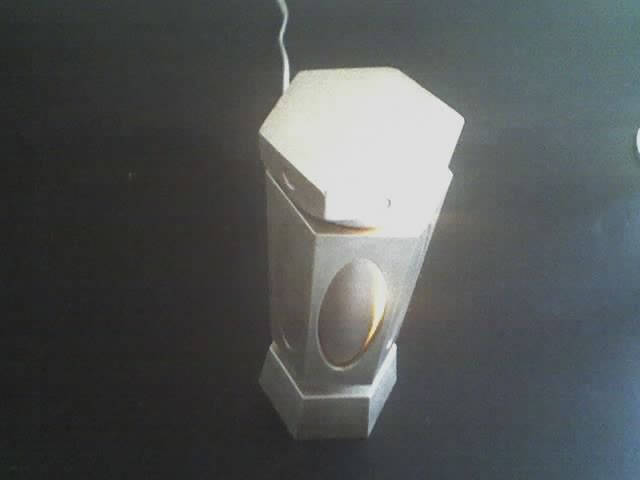
A Shabbat lamp

A Shabbat lamp is a special lamp that has movable parts to expose or block out its light so it can be turned "on" or "off" while its power physically remains on. This enables the lamp's light to be controlled by those Shabbat observant Jews who accept this use, to make a room dark or light during Shabbat without actually switching the electrical power on or off, an act prohibited by Orthodox Judaism on both Shabbat and the Jewish Holidays.

Shabbat lamps for children, such as the teddy bear pictured here, have features for covering the light without tampering with electricity. Under the bear's hat is a black shell that turns to completely hide the lightbulb.

== Halakha ==
There are various Jewish laws governing Shabbat lamps that enable their use by those who permit controlling them during Shabbat.

The lamp itself cannot be moved from its location due to the laws of muktzah. However, most authorities agree the component that is used to open or close the light is not attached, and under Jewish law, has the status of a lamp shade, which can be moved during Shabbat in order to control the amount of light that is exposed.

In addition, it is problematic in halacha to move a light because, historically, the most common lights were candles or other flames which could easily go out if moved. (This applies only to Shabbat; during a Yom Tov that does not coincide with Shabbat, the lamp may be moved but not unplugged, as moving a candle on such a day is permitted.) The restriction on moving candles may also apply to incandescent lights, which are generally treated in halacha as similar to fires. However, Shabbat lamps are lit by and only accept a compact fluorescent lamp. These bulbs do not contain electrical filaments like those found in incandescent light bulbs, and therefore, according to some rabbinical authorities, do not constitute a fire, but rather, an electrical appliance that is permissible to move on Shabbat.

Practically speaking, a normal lamp could be covered with a towel or other object (according to some opinions) on Shabbat in order to minimize its light. However, the Shabbat lamp has a close-fitting cover which is much more effective and safe at producing total darkness.

The 15 watt compact fluorescent bulb (CFL) used also has the benefit of using a minimal amount of energy, as the lamp must remain on for a period of at least 25 hours.

== See also ==
- Electricity on Shabbat
- Shabbat clock
- Sabbath mode
