= Shabbat =

Judaism's weekly day of rest

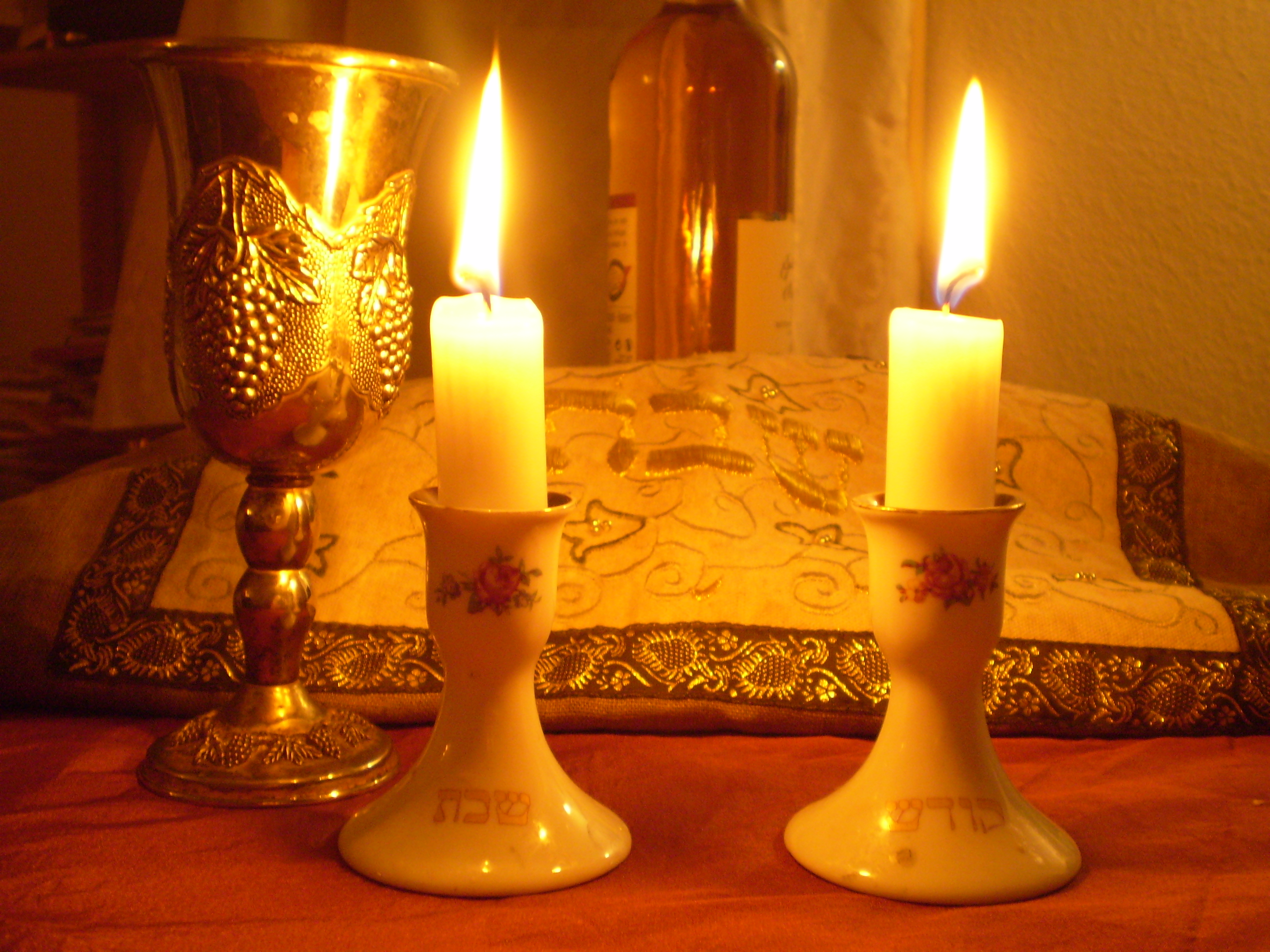
- Kiddush cup, Shabbat candles and challah cover

Halakhic texts relating to this article
- Torah: Exodus 20:7–10, Deut 5:12–14, numerous others.
- Mishnah: Shabbat, Eruvin
- Babylonian Talmud: Shabbat, Eruvin
- Jerusalem Talmud: Shabbat, Eruvin
- Mishneh Torah: Sefer Zmanim, Shabbat 1–30; Eruvin 1–8
- Shulchan Aruch: Orach Chayim, Shabbat 244–344; Eruvin 345–395; Techumin 396–416
- Other rabbinic codes: Kitzur Shulchan Aruch ch. 72–96

Shabbat (UK: /ʃəˈbæt/, US: /ʃəˈbɑːt/, or /ʃəˈbʌt/; Hebrew: שַׁבָּת, [ʃa'bat], lit. 'rest' or 'cessation') or the Sabbath (/ˈsæbəθ/), also called Shabbos (UK: /ˈʃæbəs/, US: /ˈʃɑːbəs/) by Ashkenazim, is Judaism's day of rest on the seventh day of the week—i.e., Saturday. On this day, religious Jews remember the biblical stories describing the creation of the heaven and earth in six days and the redemption from slavery and the Exodus from Egypt. Since the Jewish religious calendar counts days from sunset to sunset, Shabbat begins in the evening of what on the civil calendar is Friday.

Shabbat observance entails refraining from work activities, and engaging in restful activities to honor the day. Judaism's traditional position is that the unbroken seventh-day Shabbat originated among the Jewish people as their first and most sacred institution. Variations upon Shabbat are widespread in Judaism and, with adaptations, throughout the Abrahamic and many other religions.

According to halakha (Jewish religious law), Shabbat is observed from a few minutes before the sun sets on Friday evening until the appearance of three stars in the sky on Saturday night, or an hour after sundown. Shabbat is ushered in by lighting candles and reciting blessings over wine and bread. Traditionally, three festive meals are eaten: The first one is held on Friday evening, the second is traditionally a lunch meal on Saturday, and the third is held later Saturday afternoon. The evening meal and the early afternoon meal typically begin with a blessing called kiddush (sanctification), said over a cup of wine.

At the third meal a kiddush is not performed, but the hamotzi blessing is recited and challah (braided bread) is eaten. In many communities, this meal is often eaten in the period after the afternoon prayers (Minchah) are recited and shortly before Shabbat is formally ended with a Havdalah ritual.

Shabbat is a festive day when Jews exercise their freedom from the regular labours of everyday life. It offers an opportunity to contemplate the spiritual aspects of life and to spend time with family. The end of Shabbat is traditionally marked by a ritual called Havdalah, during which blessings are said over wine (or grape juice), aromatic spices, and Havdalah candle lighting, separating Shabbat from the rest of the week.

== Etymology ==
The word Shabbat derives from the Hebrew root ש־ב־ת. Although frequently translated as "rest" (noun or verb), another accurate translation is "ceasing [from work]." The notion of active cessation from labour is also regarded as more consistent with an omnipotent God's activity on the seventh day of creation according to Genesis.

== Origins ==
=== Babylon ===
A number of scholars propose a cognate Akkadian word šapattu or šabattu, which refers to the day of the full moon. A lexicographic list found in the library of Ashurbanipal glosses šabattu as "[the gods'] day of the heart's rest" (ūm nûḫ libbi), although this probably refers to the appeasement of the gods' anger. Other scholars doubt that there is a connection between the biblical Sabbath and the Akkadian šapattu/šabattu, as the two words may not have a common etymology and šapattu refers almost exclusively to the fifteenth day of the month or the phenomenon of lunar alignment, not to the seventh day of a week.

Connection to Sabbath observance has been suggested in the designation of the seventh, fourteenth, nineteenth, twenty-first and twenty-eight days of a lunar month in an Assyrian religious calendar as a 'holy day', also called 'evil days' (meaning "unsuitable" for prohibited activities). The prohibitions on these days, spaced seven days apart (except the nineteenth), include abstaining from chariot riding, and the avoidance of eating meat by the King. On these days officials were prohibited from various activities and common men were forbidden to "make a wish", and at least the 28th was known as a "rest-day". This theory has also been challenged on the grounds that the 'evil days' did not always fall every seven days and did not entail a general cessation of work.

The Universal Jewish Encyclopedia advanced a theory of Assyriologists like Friedrich Delitzsch (and of Marcello Craveri) that Shabbat originally arose from the lunar cycle in the Babylonian calendar containing four weeks ending in a Sabbath, plus one or two additional unreckoned days per month. The difficulties of this theory include reconciling the differences between an unbroken week and a lunar week, and explaining the absence of texts naming the lunar week as Sabbath in any language.

=== Egypt ===
Seventh-day Shabbat did not originate with the Egyptians, to whom it was unknown; and other origin theories based on the day of Saturn, or on the planets generally, have also been abandoned.

=== Hebrew Bible ===
Sabbath is given special status as a holy day at the very beginning of the Torah in Genesis 2:1–3. It is first commanded after the Exodus from Egypt, in Exodus 16:26 (relating to the cessation of manna) and in Exodus 16:29 (relating to the distance one may travel by foot on the Sabbath). It is also commanded in Exodus 20:8–11 (as one of the Ten Commandments). Sabbath is commanded and commended many more times in the Torah and Tanakh, appearing 111 times in a total of 89 verses across the Hebrew Bible, including by the prophets Isaiah, Jeremiah, Ezekiel, Hosea, Amos, and Nehemiah. Twice as many animal sacrifices were offered on Shabbat compared to the daily offering of the other six days of the week.

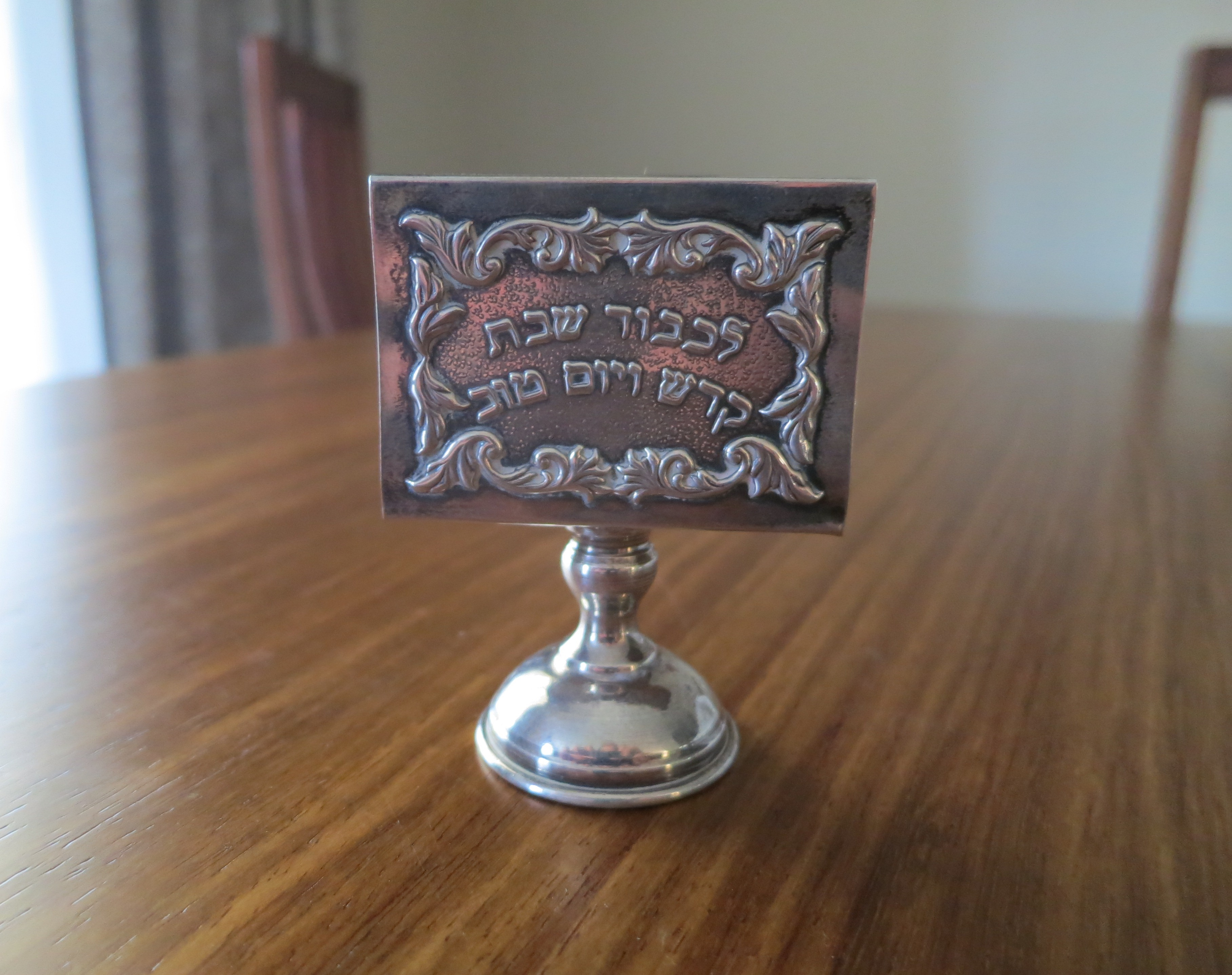
A silver matchbox holder for Shabbat from North Macedonia

The longstanding Jewish position is that the continuous observance of the seventh day Shabbat originated among the Jewish people, as their first and most sacred institution. The origins of Shabbat and a seven-day week are not clear to scholars; the Mosaic tradition claims an origin from the Genesis creation narrative.

The first non-Biblical reference to Sabbath is in an ostracon found in excavations at Mesad Hashavyahu, which has been dated to approximately 630 BCE.

== Status as a Jewish holy day ==
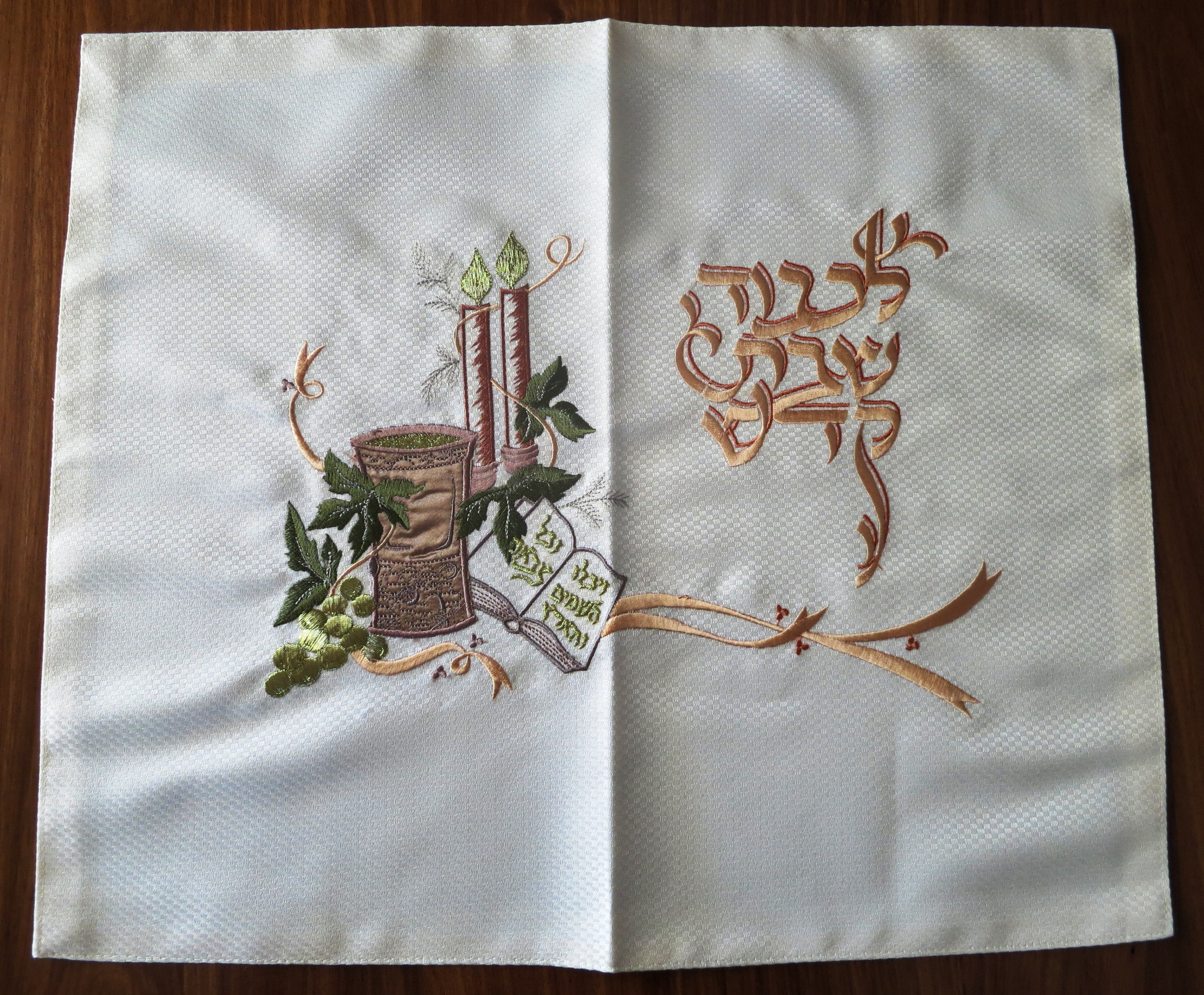
A challah cover with Hebrew inscription

The Tanakh and siddur describe Shabbat as having three purposes:

1. To commemorate God's creation of the universe, on the seventh day of which God rested from (or ceased) his work, which is the reason cited in the Ten Commandments as they appear in the Exodus 20 ("For in six days the Lord made the heavens and the earth... but he rested on the seventh day. Therefore the Lord blessed the Sabbath day and made it holy.");
2. To commemorate the Exodus of the Israelites and their redemption from slavery in ancient Egypt, which is the reason cited in the Ten Commandments as they appear in the Deuteronomy 5 ("Remember that you were slaves in Egypt and that the Lord your God brought you out of there with a mighty hand.... Therefore the Lord your God has commanded you to observe the Sabbath day.")
3. As a "taste" of Olam Haba (the "world to come" in the Messianic Age).

Judaism accords Shabbat the status of a joyous holy day. In many ways, Jewish law gives Shabbat the status of being the most important holy day in the Hebrew calendar:

- It is the first holy day mentioned in the Bible, and God was the first to observe it with the cessation of creation (Genesis 2:1–3).
- Jewish liturgy treats Shabbat as a "bride" and "queen" (see Shekhinah); some sources described it as a "king".
- The Sefer Torah is read during the Torah reading which is part of the Shabbat morning services, with a longer reading than during the week. The Torah is read over a yearly cycle of 54 parashioth, one for each Shabbat (sometimes they are doubled). On Shabbat, the reading is divided into seven sections, more than on any other holy day, including Yom Kippur. Then, the Haftarah reading from the Hebrew prophets is read.
- A tradition states that the Jewish Messiah will come if every Jew properly observes two consecutive Shabbatoth.
- The punishment in ancient times for desecrating Shabbat (stoning) is the most severe punishment in Jewish law. In addition, the divine punishment for desecrating Shabbat, kareth (spiritual excommunication), is the most severe of divine punishments in Judaism.
- On Shabbat an offering of two lambs was brought in the temple in Jerusalem.

== Rituals ==
=== Welcoming Shabbat ===
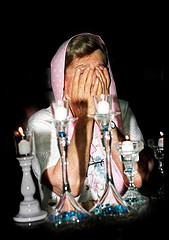
Jewish woman reciting blessing over Shabbat candles

Honoring Shabbat (kavod Shabbat) on Preparation Day (Friday) includes bathing, having a haircut and cleaning and beautifying the home (with flowers, for example).

Days in the Jewish calendar start at nightfall, therefore many Jewish holidays begin at such time. According to Jewish law, Shabbat starts a few minutes before sunset. Candles are lit at this time. The most common custom is to light Shabbat candles 18 minutes before sundown (tosefet Shabbat, literally "adding to Shabbat"), and most printed Jewish calendars adhere to this custom, though the amount of time added in different communities can range from 15 minutes (including in the United Kingdom and by Satmar Hasidim) and the custom in Jerusalem to begin the Sabbath 40 minutes before the sun sets.

The Kabbalat Shabbat service is a prayer service welcoming the arrival of Shabbat. Before Friday night dinner, it is customary to sing two songs, one "greeting" two Shabbat angels into the house ("Shalom Aleichem" -"Peace Be Upon You") and the other praising the woman of the house for all the work she has done over the past week ("Eshet Ḥayil" – "Woman Of Valour"). In modern times, many composers have written sacred music for use during the Kabbalat Shabbat observance, including Robert Strassburg and Samuel Adler.

After blessings over the wine and challah, a festive meal is served. Singing is traditional at Sabbath meals.

According to rabbinic literature, God via the Torah commands Jews about Shabbat in the Ten Commandments using the word to observe (refrain from forbidden activity) in the Book of Exodus and remember (with words, thoughts, and actions) in the Book of Deuteronomy, and that these two actions are symbolized by the customary two Shabbat candles. Candles are lit usually by the woman of the house (or else by a man who lives alone). Some families light more candles, sometimes in accordance with the number of children.

=== Other rituals ===
Shabbat is a day of celebration as well as prayer. It is customary to eat three festive meals: Dinner on Shabbat eve (Friday night), lunch on Shabbat day (Saturday), and a third meal (a Seudah shlishit) in the late afternoon (Saturday). It is also customary to wear nice clothing (different from during the week) on Shabbat to honor the day.

Many Jews attend synagogue services on Shabbat even if they do not do so during the week. Services are held on Shabbat eve (Friday night), Shabbat morning (Saturday morning), and late Shabbat afternoon (Saturday afternoon).

With the exception of Yom Kippur, days of public fasting are postponed or advanced if they coincide with Shabbat.

Mourners sitting shivah (week of mourning subsequent to the death of a spouse or first-degree relative) continue their mourning in private, while outwardly conducting themselves normally for the duration of the day and are forbidden to display public signs of mourning.

Although most Shabbat laws are restrictive, the fourth of the Ten Commandments in Exodus is taken by the Talmud and Maimonides to allude to the positive commandments of Shabbat. These include:

- Honoring Shabbat (kavod Shabbat): on Shabbat, wearing festive clothing and refraining from unpleasant conversation. It is customary to avoid talking on Shabbat about money, business matters, or secular things that one might discuss during the week.
- Recitation of kiddush over a cup of wine at the beginning of Shabbat meals, or at a reception after the conclusion of morning prayers (see the list of Jewish prayers and blessings).
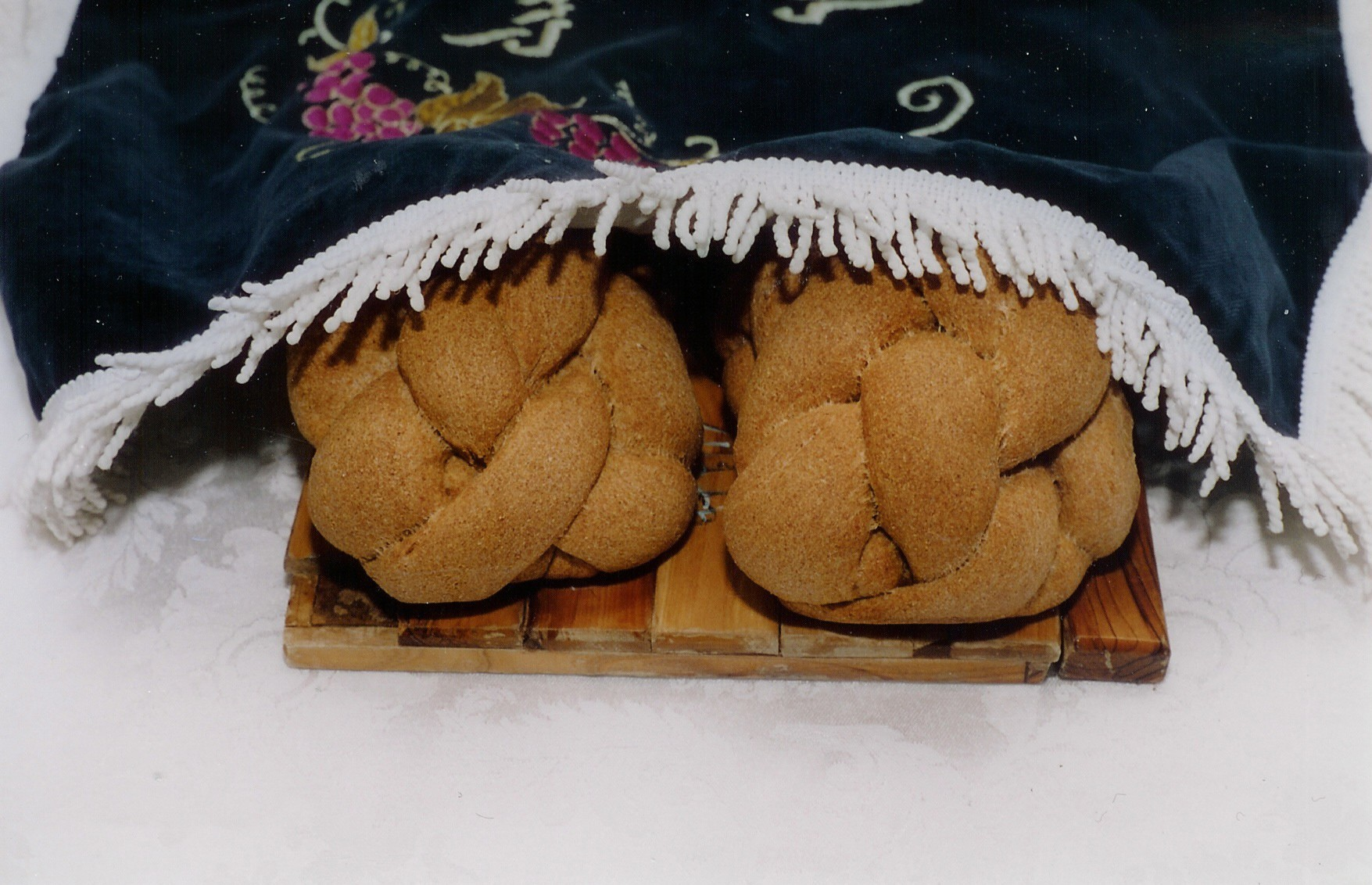
- Two homemade whole-wheat challot covered by traditional embroidered Shabbat challah cover
  Eating three festive meals. Meals begin with a blessing over two loaves of bread (lechem mishneh, "double bread"), usually of braided challah, which is symbolic of the double portion of manna that fell for the Jewish people on the day before Sabbath during their 40 years in the desert after the Exodus from Ancient Egypt. It is customary to serve meat or fish, and sometimes both, for Shabbat evening and morning meals. Seudah Shlishit (literally, "third meal"), generally a light meal that may be pareve or dairy, is eaten late Shabbat afternoon.
- Enjoying Shabbat (oneg Shabbat): Engaging in pleasurable activities such as eating, singing, sleeping, spending time with the family, and marital relations. Sometimes referred to as "Shabbating".
- Recitation of havdalah.

=== Ending Shabbat ===
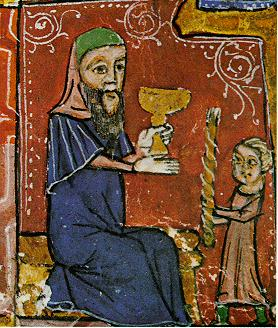
Observing the closing havdalah ritual in 14th-century Spain

Havdalah (Hebrew: הַבְדָּלָה, "separation") is a Jewish religious ceremony that marks the symbolic end of Shabbat, and ushers in the new week. At the conclusion of Shabbat at nightfall, after the appearance of three stars in the sky, the havdalah blessings are recited over a cup of wine, and with the use of fragrant spices and a candle, usually braided. Some communities delay havdalah later into the night in order to prolong Shabbat. There are different customs regarding how much time one should wait after the stars have surfaced until the sabbath technically ends. Some people hold by 72 minutes later and others hold longer or shorter than that.

== Prohibited activities ==
Jewish law (halakha) prohibits doing any form of melakhah (מְלָאכָה, plural melakhoth) on Shabbat, unless an urgent human or medical need is life-threatening. Though melakhah is commonly translated as "work" in English, a better definition is "deliberate activity" or "skill and craftmanship". There are 39 categories of melakhah:

- plowing earth
- sowing
- reaping
- binding sheaves
- threshing
- winnowing
- selecting
- grinding
- sifting
- kneading
- baking
- shearing wool
- washing wool
- beating wool
- dyeing wool
- spinning
- weaving
- making two loops
- weaving two threads
- separating two threads
- tying
- untying
- sewing stitches
- tearing
- trapping
- slaughtering
- flaying
- tanning
- scraping hide
- marking hide
- cutting hide to shape
- writing two or more letters
- erasing two or more letters
- building
- demolishing
- extinguishing a fire
- kindling a fire
- putting the finishing touch on an object, and
- transporting an object (between private and public domains, or over 4 cubits within public domain)

The 39 melakhoth are not so much activities as "categories of activity". For example, while "winnowing" usually refers exclusively to the separation of chaff from grain, and "selecting" refers exclusively to the separation of debris from grain, they refer in the Talmudic sense to any separation of intermixed materials which renders edible that which was inedible. Thus, filtering undrinkable water to make it drinkable falls under this category, as does picking small bones from fish (gefilte fish is one solution to this problem).

The categories of labors prohibited on Shabbat are exegetically derived – on account of Biblical passages juxtaposing Shabbat observance (Exodus 35:1–3) to making the Tabernacle (Exodus 35:4 etc.) – that they are the kinds of work that were necessary for the construction of the Tabernacle. They are not explicitly listed in the Torah; the Mishnah observes that "the laws of Shabbat ... are like mountains hanging by a hair, for they are little Scripture but many laws". Many rabbinic scholars have pointed out that these labors have in common activity that is "creative", or that exercises control or dominion over one's environment.

In addition to the 39 melakhot, additional activities were prohibited by the rabbis for various reasons.

The term shomer Shabbat is used for a person (or organization) who adheres to Shabbat laws consistently. The (strict) observance of the Sabbath is often seen as a benchmark for orthodoxy and indeed has legal bearing on the way a Jew is seen by an orthodox religious court regarding their affiliation to Judaism.

=== Specific applications ===
==== Electricity ====
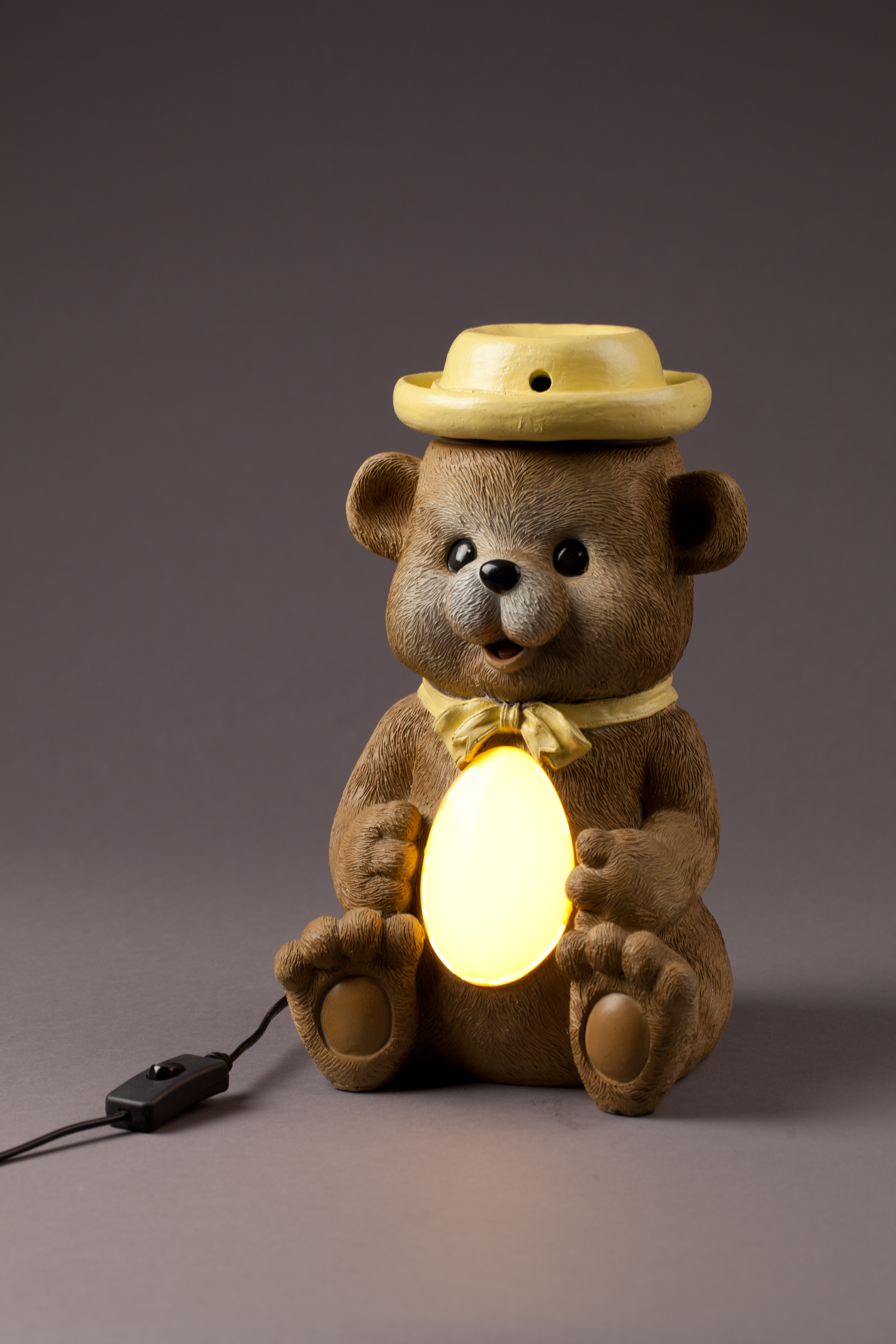
Teddy bear lamp in the collection of the Jewish Museum of Switzerland. The cap can be twisted, which covers the lightbulb with a dark shell and dims the light in a way arguably acceptable on the sabbath

Orthodox and some Conservative authorities rule that turning electric devices on or off is prohibited as a melakhah; however, authorities are not in agreement about exactly which one(s). One view is that tiny sparks are created in a switch when the circuit is closed, and this would constitute lighting a fire (category 37). If the appliance is purposed for light or heat (such as an incandescent bulb or electric oven), then the lighting or heating elements may be considered as a type of fire that falls under both lighting a fire (category 37) and cooking (i.e., baking, category 11). Turning lights off would be extinguishing a fire (category 36). Another view is that completing an electrical circuit constitutes building (category 35) and turning off the circuit would be demolishing (category 34). Some schools of thought consider the use of electricity to be forbidden only by rabbinic injunction, rather than a melakhah.

A common solution to the problem of electricity involves preset timers (Shabbat clocks) for electric appliances, to turn them on and off automatically, with no human intervention on Shabbat itself. Some Conservative authorities reject altogether the arguments for prohibiting the use of electricity. Some Orthodox also hire a "Shabbos goy", a non-Jew (who must not be regularly employed by the household in question) to perform prohibited tasks (like operating light switches) on Shabbat.

==== Automobiles ====
Orthodox and many Conservative authorities completely prohibit the use of automobiles on Shabbat as a violation of multiple categories, including lighting a fire, extinguishing a fire, and transferring between domains (category 39). However, the Conservative movement's Committee on Jewish Law and Standards permits driving to a synagogue on Shabbat, as an emergency measure, on the grounds that if Jews lost contact with synagogue life, they would become lost to the Jewish people.

A halakhically authorized Shabbat mode added to a power-operated mobility scooter may be used on the observance of Shabbat for those with walking limitations, often referred to as a Shabbat scooter. It is intended only for individuals whose limited mobility is dependent on a scooter or automobile consistently throughout the week.

==== Modifications ====
Seemingly "forbidden" acts may be performed by modifying technology such that no law is actually violated. In Sabbath mode, a "Sabbath elevator" will stop automatically at every floor, allowing people to step on and off without anyone having to press any buttons, which would normally be needed to work. (Dynamic braking is also disabled if it is normally used, i.e., shunting energy collected from downward travel, and thus the gravitational potential energy of passengers, into a resistor network.) However, many rabbinical authorities consider the use of such elevators by those who are otherwise capable as a violation of Shabbat, with such workarounds being for the benefit of the frail and handicapped and not being in the spirit of the day.

Many observant Jews avoid the prohibition of carrying by use of an eruv. Others make their keys into a tie bar, part of a belt buckle, or a brooch, because a legitimate article of clothing or jewelry may be worn rather than carried. An elastic band with clips on both ends, and with keys placed between them as integral links, may be considered a belt.

Shabbat lamps have been developed to allow a light in a room to be turned on or off at will while the electricity remains on. A special mechanism blocks out the light when the off position is desired without violating Shabbat.

The Shabbos App is a proposed Android app claimed by its creators to enable Orthodox Jews, and all Jewish Sabbath-observers, to use a smartphone to text on the Jewish Sabbath. It has met with resistance from some authorities.

==== Permissions ====
If a human life is in danger (pikuach nefesh), then a Jew is not only allowed, but required, to violate any halakhic law that stands in the way of saving that person (excluding murder, idolatry, and forbidden sexual acts). The concept of life being in danger is interpreted broadly: for example, it is mandated that one violate Shabbat to bring a woman in active labor to a hospital. Lesser rabbinic restrictions are often violated under much less urgent circumstances (a patient who is ill but not critically so).

We did everything to save lives, despite Shabbat. People asked: "Why are you here? There are no Jews here," but we are here because the Torah orders us to save lives .... We are desecrating Shabbat with pride.

— Mati Goldstein, commander of the Jewish ZAKA rescue-mission to the 2010 Haiti earthquake

Various other legal principles closely delineate which activities constitute desecration of Shabbat. Examples of these include the principle of shinui ("change" or "deviation"): A violation is not regarded as severe if the prohibited act was performed in a way that would be considered abnormal on a weekday. Examples include writing with one's nondominant hand, according to many rabbinic authorities. This legal principle operates bedi'avad (ex post facto) and does not cause a forbidden activity to be permitted barring extenuating circumstances.

=== Reform and Reconstructionist views ===
Generally, adherents of Reform and Reconstructionist Judaism believe that the individual Jew determines whether to follow Shabbat prohibitions or not. For example, some Jews might find activities, such as writing or cooking for leisure, to be enjoyable enhancements to Shabbat and its holiness, and therefore may encourage such practices. Many Reform Jews believe that what constitutes "work" is different for each person, and that only what the person considers "work" is forbidden. The radical Reform rabbi Samuel Holdheim advocated moving Sabbath to Sunday for many no longer observed it, a step taken by dozens of congregations in the United States in late 19th century.

More rabbinically traditional Reform and Reconstructionist Jews believe that these halakhoth in general may be valid, but that it is up to each individual to decide how and when to apply them. A small fraction of Jews in the Progressive Jewish community accept these laws in much the same way as Orthodox Jews.

== Encouraged activities ==
The Talmud, especially in tractate Shabbat, defines rituals and activities to both "remember" and "keep" the Sabbath holy and to sanctify it at home and in the synagogue. In addition to refraining from creative work, the sanctification of the day through blessings over wine, the preparation of special Sabbath meals, and engaging in prayer and Torah study were required as an active part of Shabbat observance to promote intellectual activity and spiritual regeneration on the day of rest from physical creation. According to many scribes, half of the day should be devoted to Torah study and prayer. The Talmud states that the best food should be prepared for the Sabbath, for "one who delights in the Sabbath is granted their heart's desires" (BT, Shabbat 118a-b).

All Jewish denominations encourage the following activities on Shabbat:

- Reading, studying, and discussing Torah and commentary, Mishnah and Talmud, and learning some halakha and midrash.
- Synagogue attendance for prayers.
- Spending time with other Jews and socializing with family, friends, and guests at Shabbat meals (hachnasat orchim, "hospitality").
- Singing zemiroth or niggunim, special songs for Shabbat meals (commonly sung during or after a meal).
- Sex between husband and wife.
- Sleeping.

== Special Shabbat ==
Special Shabbatot are the Shabbatot that precede important Jewish holidays: e.g., Shabbat HaGadol (Shabbat preceding Pesach), Shabbat Zachor (Shabbat preceding Purim), and Shabbat Shuvah (Shabbat between Rosh Hashanah and Yom Kippur).

== In other religions ==
=== Christianity ===
Most Christians do not observe Saturday Sabbath, but instead observe a weekly day of worship on Sunday, which is often called the "Lord's Day". Several Christian denominations, such as the Seventh-day Adventist Church, the Church of God (7th Day), the Seventh Day Baptists, and others, observe seventh-day Sabbath. This observance is celebrated from Friday sunset to Saturday sunset.

=== Samaritans ===
Samaritans observe Shabbat, during which time all electricity, with the exception of minimal lighting (kept on the entire day), in the home is disconnected, no work is done, and neither cooking nor driving is allowed. The Kitab at-Tabbah prohibits swearing on Shabbat, and other medieval manuscripts indicate that breaking such prohibitions was once an offense punishable by death.

=== Karaite Judaism ===
Karaite observe Shabbat on Saturday, but interpret Sabbath law differently from Rabbinic Judaism. For example, traditional Karaite practice has often been stricter about fire and electricity than mainstream Rabbinic practice.

=== Islam ===
Although Muslims do not observe Saturday Sabbath, the name of Saturday in the Islamic calendar, السَّبْت as-Sabt, is etymologically-related to its Hebrew name, likewise meaning 'rest.'

== Lunar Sabbath ==
Some hold the biblical sabbath was not connected to a seven-day week like the Gregorian calendar. Instead the New Moon marks the starting point for counting and the shabbat falls consistently on the 8th, 15th, 22nd, 29th of each month. Biblical text to support using the moon, a light in the heavens, to determine days include Genesis 1:14, Psalm 104:19, and Sirach 43:6–8 See references:

Rabbinic Jewish tradition and practice does not hold of this, holding the sabbath to be based on the days of creation, and hence a wholly separate cycle from the monthly cycle, which does not occur automatically and must be rededicated each month. See kiddush hachodesh.

== See also ==
- List of Shabbat topics
- Baqashot
- Jewish greetings
- Jewish prayer § Prayer on Shabbat
- Lord's Day
- Shmita
- Techum shabbat or techum, physical area in which a Jew is permitted to walk on Shabbat and Jewish holidays
- Uposatha
