= Shomer Shabbat =

Person who observes the Jewish Shabbat

A person who is shomer Shabbat or shomer Shabbos (Hebrew: שומר שבת, "one who observes/keeps the Sabbath") is someone who observes the mitzvot (commandments) associated with Judaism's Shabbat, or Sabbath, which begins at dusk on Friday and ends after nightfall on Saturday.

Keeping Shabbat is seen in Judaism as a "sanctification of time", in which the seventh day is distinguished from the other six through both refraining from labor and engaging in positive practices. Under Jewish law (halakhah), this includes abstaining from acts defined as melacha—forms of creative or constructive work prohibited on Shabbat. These acts include cooking, handling money, writing, operating electrical devices, and other restricted activities. In addition to these prohibitions, individuals are expected to fulfill positive commandments, including enjoying festive meals, engaging in prayer and study, performing rituals, resting, practicing kindness—and for married couples, engaging in sexual intimacy on Friday night.

In Orthodox Judaism, shomer Shabbat generally refers to full observance of halakhic guidelines regarding Shabbat. In most other Jewish movements, the term may describe someone who maintains core elements of Shabbat, such as candle lighting or refraining from work, even if not observing every traditional restriction. Practices vary widely, and in many communities, individuals or families adapt Shabbat observance in ways that align with their beliefs and circumstances.

Being shomer Shabbat often accompanies broader patterns of traditional observance, but not exclusively. Some people center their Jewish identity primarily around Shabbat, without observing other mitzvot.

== Origin and usage ==
The phrase "shomer Shabbat" is rooted in the wording of the Ten Commandments in Deuteronomy (5:14–15), which instructs to "observe" the Sabbath and sanctify it. (In Exodus, the instruction is to "remember" the Sabbath.) The full phrase appears in the Hebrew Bible in Isaiah 56:2,6. It does not appear in the Mishnah or Talmud, and appears only infrequently in medieval and early modern rabbinic literature—for example, once in Maimonides' writings, not at all in the Shulchan Aruch, and rarely in responsa until the 20th century. The term has become more common over the past century.

Some synagogues have used the term in their names, such as a congregation in Gateshead founded in 1897 and a predecessor to Machzike Hadath in London. Manuals for observant Jews have also adopted the term, including Shemirat Shabbat ke-Hilkhatah by Rabbi Yehoshua Neuwirth, and earlier texts such as Sefer Shomer Shabbat by David ben Aryeh Leib of Lida (ca. 1650–1696).

== Social dimensions ==
In mid-20th century America, being shomer Shabbat was relatively rare, including among Orthodox Jews. Rabbi Emanuel Feldman described Sabbath observance as a "rarity" in Orthodox circles during the 1950s. Political scientist Charles Liebman estimated that about 4% of American Jews were shomer Shabbat in the 1960s. A major barrier was the lack of labor protections—Saturday was not yet a universal day off from work, and many Jews could not afford to lose their jobs for the sake of observance. Jewish communities organized efforts to change this, including a shomer Shabbat council and parade in Flatbush, Brooklyn.

According to the National Jewish Population Survey (2000–2001), 50% of affiliated Jews (compared to 8% of unaffiliated Jews) light Sabbath candles. Candle-lighting, a central mitzvah marking the start of Shabbat, is practiced by 85% of Orthodox, 50% of Conservative, and 25% of Reform Jews. Overall, 28% of NJPS respondents reported lighting Sabbath candles.

As Shabbat observance has increased in some communities, being shomer Shabbat has become a more visible aspect of Jewish identity. Some Jewish day schools consider it a factor in admissions, and observance can influence social integration. Some scholars describe it as the "functional equivalent" of Orthodox identity.

== Business and ritual roles ==
Sabbath observance influences employment, ritual status, and business operations. In Orthodox Judaism, certain religious roles require the individual to be shomer Shabbat, including signing a ketubah, acting as a kosher supervisor (mashgiach), or serving as a sofer (scribe) writing a Torah scroll.

A paper factory in Kiryat Gat was highlighted in 2000 for operating as a shomer Shabbat business. Some hospitals offer shomer Shabbat residency tracks, and in youth sports, alternate leagues exist to avoid Shabbat conflicts.

== Theological significance ==
Jewish thinkers have described Shabbat as a "palace in time", and as a sanctuary not built of space but of sacred moments. The Sabbath appears in the creation narrative as the first thing called holy, preceding any holy place. The traditional understanding holds that by refraining from melacha and engaging in rituals, Jews sanctify time in imitation of divine rest.

In this view, Shabbat is not merely about cessation from labor, but about shifting consciousness from production to presence. Some interpret it as a weekly return to alignment—a space in which spiritual values reassert themselves. The observance becomes not only a discipline of restraint but a celebration of what is eternal within time.

== Cultural references ==
In the film The Big Lebowski, the character Walter Sobchak (played by John Goodman) is a convert to Judaism who refuses to bowl on Saturday because he is shomer Shabbat.

== Bibliography ==
- Ament, Jonathan. "American Jewish Religious Denominations," NJPS Report, United Jewish Communities, 2005.
- David ben Aryeh Leib of Lida. Sefer Shomer Shabbat. 1687.
- Feldman, Emanuel. "Tradition and the Orthodox Jew in America." Tradition 2, no. 1 (1959): 7–17.
- Ginsburg, Elliot Kiba. The Sabbath in the Classical Kabbalah. Albany: SUNY Press, 1989.
- Heschel, Abraham Joshua. The Sabbath: Its Meaning for Modern Man. New York: Farrar, Straus and Giroux, 1951.
- Liebman, Charles. "Orthodoxy in American Jewish Life." American Jewish Yearbook 66 (1965): 127–150.
- Margolese, Faranak. Off the Derech: Why Observant Jews Leave Judaism; How to Respond to the Challenge. Devora Publishing, 2005.
- Neuwirth, Yehoshua. Shemirat Shabbat ke-Hilkhatah. 1993.
