= Jewish medical ethics =

Approach to medical ethics

Jewish medical ethics is a modern scholarly and clinical approach to medical ethics that draws upon Jewish thought and teachings. Pioneered by Rabbi Immanuel Jakobovits in the 1950s, Jewish medical ethics centers mainly around an applied ethics drawing upon traditional rabbinic law (halakhah). In addition, scholars have begun examining theoretical and methodological questions, while the field itself has been broadened to encompass bioethics and non-halakhic approaches.

== Key issues ==
In its early years, Jewish medical ethics addressed a range of ethical dilemmas, as well as general questions about the professional ethics for doctors. Major issues have included abortion, artificial insemination, brain death, cosmetic surgery, euthanasia, genetic screening, hazardous medical operations, circumcision, oral suction in circumcision (metzitzah b'peh), organ donation, psychiatric care, and smoking cigarettes. In recent years, Jewish bioethics has examined questions of medical technology, the allocation of medical resources, and the philosophy of Jewish ethics.

== History ==
The 10th-century Jewish physician Isaac Israeli authored a work titled Musar ha-Rof'im ("Ethics for Physicians"), preserved in Hebrew translation. It provided guidance on the moral and practical responsibilities of physicians toward their patients.

In 19th century Wissenschaft des Judentums, scholars like Julius Preuss studied Talmudic approaches to medicine. Rabbi Immanuel Jakobovits was a prominent figure in 20th century Jewish medical ethics and a pioneer in religious bioethics. His specialty was the interaction between medical ethics and halakha. Thanks to his academic training in Ireland, Rabbi Jakobovits approached his comprehensive volume, Jewish Medical Ethics, in light of Catholic medical ethics, with which he often compares Jewish ethics. Whether developing or disputing his analysis, subsequent Jewish bioethicists have utilized his work on abortion, euthanasia, the history of Jewish medical ethics, palliative care, treatment of the sick, and professional duties. Likewise, he is credited with popularizing the claim that Judaism supports the nearly absolute sanctity of life.

In its early years, Jewish medical ethics was predominantly an applied ethics. Orthodox pioneers included rabbis and scholars J. David Bleich, Fred Rosner, Avraham Steinberg, Saul J. Berman, Moshe David Tendler, as well as major rabbinic authorities, such as Shlomo Zalman Auerbach, Moshe Feinstein and Eliezer Waldenberg. The reform movement's pioneers included Solomon Freehof, and later involvement by Walter Jacob and Moshe Zemer. Pioneering medical ethicists in the Conservative movement included rabbis Elliot Dorff, David Feldman, Aaron Mackler, Joel Roth, and Avram Reisner, while more recent figures have included Leonard Sharzer. Among those oriented to bioethics, leading thinkers include Daniel Sinclair and Noam Zohar. Dr. Mark J. Poznansky, a member of the Order of Canada, has been a leading voice on issues of human and animal experimentation.

Organizationally, Jewish medical ethics and bioethics has grown, especially in the United States and Israel. Journals dedicated to medical ethics include the "Assia" Journal of Jewish Ethics and Halacha. Avraham Steinberg's 7-volume Encyclopedia Hilchatit Refuit in Hebrew has been translated into English by Professor Fred Rosner as the Encyclopedia of Jewish Medical Ethics.

In Israel, where there are several educational institutes dedicated to Jewish Medical Ethics, many hospitals work closely with Jewish clinical ethicists. Jewish medical ethics and bioethics has been the topic of numerous scholarly conferences, educational workshops, and lectureships, including the "International Conference on Jewish Medical Ethics." Organizations such as the Dr. Falk Schlesinger Institute for Medico-Halakhic Research at the Shaare Zedek Medical Center in Jerusalem, and the Rohr Jewish Learning Institute teach classes on Jewish Medical Ethics to professionals and students.

== See also ==
- Medical genetics of Jews

== Bibliography ==
- Avraham, A.S. Lev Avraham: Hilchot Refuah le-Kholeh v'le-meshamesh, Jerusalem: Feldheim Publishers, 1976
- _________. Nishmat Avraham, Hilchot Cholim, Rofim ve-Refuah Jerusalem: Schlesinger Institute, 1983–2000. Note: This is a codificatory publication on halakhah pertaining to medical ethics.
- Bleich, J. David. 1981. Judaism and Healing. New York: Ktav.
- Aron Brand. "Medical oaths and preventative medicine," Koroth, 7, no. 3–4, December 1976
- Conservative Judaism. 2002. Vol. 54(3). Contains a set of six articles on bioethics.
- Elliot Dorff. 1998. Matters of Life and Death: A Jewish Approach to Modern Medical Ethics. Philadelphia: Jewish Publication Society.
- Eisenberg, Daniel. (Various articles)
- David Feldman. 1974. Marital Relations, Birth Control, and Abortion in Jewish Law. New York: Schocken Books.
- Freedman, B. 1999. Duty and Healing: Foundations of a Jewish Bioethic. New York: Routledge.
- Guggenheim, R., Leupin, L., Nordmann Y. and Patcas, R. (ed.) 2010. The Value of Human Life - Contemporary Perspectives in Jewish Medical Ethics, Feldheim Publishers.
- Halperin, Mordechai. "Milestones in Jewish Medical Ethics Medical-Halachic Literature in Israel, 1948-1998" online version
- Jakobovits, Immanuel. 1959. Jewish Medical Ethics. New York: Bloch Publishing.
- Katznelson, Y. Ha-Talmud ve-Hokhmat ha-Refu’a. Berlin: Haim Press, 1928
- Mackler, Aaron L., ed. 2000. Life & Death Responsibilities in Jewish Biomedical Ethics. JTS.
- Maibaum, M. 1986. "A 'progressive' Jewish medical ethics: notes for an agenda." Journal of Reform Judaism 33(3): 27–33.
- Perlman, Moshe. Midrash ha-Refu’a, Tel Aviv: Dvir 1926-34
- Preuss, Julius. Biblisch-Talmudische Medizin
- Rosner, Fred. 1986. Modern Medicine and Jewish Ethics. New York: Yeshiva University Press.
- Byron Sherwin. 2004. Golems among us: How a Jewish legend can help us navigate the biotech century
- Sinclair, Daniel. 1989. Tradition and the biological revolution: The application of Jewish law to the treatment of the critically ill
- _________. Jewish biomedical law. Oxford
- Zohar, Noam J. 1997. Alternatives in Jewish Bioethics. Albany: State University of New York Press.
- Zoloth Laurie. 1999. Health care and the ethics of encounter: A Jewish discussion of social justice. Univ. of North Carolina Press.
- Assia, Hebrew journal on Jewish medical ethics. English selections are available.
- Encyclopedia of Jewish Medical Ethics by Avraham Steinberg.
