= Judaism and abortion =

Aspect of religion

In Judaism, views on abortion draw primarily upon the legal and ethical teachings of the Hebrew Bible, the Talmud, the case-by-case decisions of responsa, and other rabbinic literature. While most major Jewish religious movements discourage abortion, except to save the life of a pregnant woman, authorities differ on when and whether it is permitted in other cases.

== Biblical sources ==
There is no direct reference in the Hebrew Bible to an intentional termination of pregnancy.

Numbers 5:11–31 refers to the Ordeal of the bitter water, which has been interpreted by some biblical commentators as an ordeal that produces a miscarriage in an unfaithful wife, thus verifying or falsifying a charge of adultery. However, most scholars agree that the test concerns fertility, not inducement of abortion.

Exodus 21:22–23 refers to a premature birth as a result of a violent altercation where a pregnant woman is injured, either intentionally or unintentionally, causing her to either give birth prematurely or to miscarry. It reads: "And if men strive together, and hurt a woman with child, so that her fruit depart, and yet no harm follow, he shall be surely fined whatever the woman's husband demands and the court allows. But if there is serious injury, you are to take life for life."

The ancient Jewish historian Philo taught that the term "harm" refers exclusively to the child, and whether a fine is imposed or capital punishment depends on whether the fetus has sufficiently formed. According to Rashi and other Talmudic commentators, the term "harm" refers only to the mother, and traditionally, unless the mother was harmed too, only a fine was imposed for causing a miscarriage.

In mainstream rabbinic Judaism, this verse is one of several key texts that substantiate the later rabbinic prohibition on most cases of abortion. However, others have argued that abortion is not considered murder and that "Jewish law does not consider a fetus to be alive." To support such a view, it is suggested that this verse shows "that the fetus is not a person. The primary concern is the well-being of the person who was injured." According to many rishonim, this verse proves that the fetus does not have the status of a human life. To gain the status of human life, the Mishnah states that the head or a greater portion of the fetus must exit the birth canal. Before then, the fetus is not considered a person.

== Rabbinic sources ==
Rabbinic law or halakhah allows abortion in certain circumstances. Some authorities permitted abortion in cases of 'great need.'

Most Rabbinic interpretations even insist on abortion in order to the save the pregnant woman's life. The fetus is viewed as valuable, but not considered human.

=== Importance of saving a fetus ===
In halakha, just as the principle of pikuach nefesh allows violating nearly all laws in order to save a human life, many laws may be violated in order to save the life of a fetus. Shabbat must be violated to save the life of a fetus. A pregnant woman who develops a ravenous hunger must be fed even on Yom Kippur to prevent loss of life; later authorities debate whether the situation described involves danger to the fetus, mother, or both.

=== Fetus as less than fully human ===
Rabbinic Judaism does not regard the fetus as a full human being. The Mishnah declares that one who kills a one-day-old baby is criminally liable and deserves a penalty the same as that of the death of the mother. Until it has been established that the pregnancy has been completed and life is formed, the fetus is not included as a life deserving of another life. In the reading of Biblical homicide laws, rabbinic sages argue that homicide concerns an animate human being (nefesh adam from Lev. 24:17) alone, not an embryo... because the embryo is not a person (lav nefesh hu). An embryo is not deemed a fully viable person (bar kayyama), but rather a being of "doubtful viability". Hence, for instance, Jewish mourning rites do not apply to an unborn child. The status of the embryo is also indicated by its treatment as "an appendage of its mother" for such matters as ownership, maternal conversion and purity law. In even more evocative language, the Talmud states in a passage on priestly rules that the fetus "is considered to be mere water" until its 40th day. Elsewhere, the Talmud speaks of a "moment of determination" and a "moment of creation" in regard to different stages of the fetus. Rashi explains that the moment of creation is when bones and arteries begin to form and in other places he says that the "moment of creation" is at the 40th day.

Many Jewish traditions therefore state sitting shiva, holding a public burial, recognizing the yartzeit (anniversary of a death), or other mourning rituals do not apply in the case of aborted or miscarried fetuses. In recent years, a variety of new types of observances are arising to give individuals and families sacred paths to mourning and remembrance in accordance with halakah. An example would be the Jewish Community Memory Garden.

=== Precedence of the mother's life ===
The fetus however, though considered "alive" to the extent that its life is protected, is not considered fully alive to the extent that if it endangered the mother's life it takes precedence. Thus if a pregnancy risks the life of the mother, the Rabbis rule that the mother's life takes precedence and that the child may be aborted so as to save the mother's life: "If a woman is in hard travail, one cuts up the offspring in her womb and brings it forth member by member, because her life comes before the life of her foetus. But if the greater part has proceeded forth, one may not set aside one person for the sake of saving another." According to the text this can be done until the point of yatza rubo (יָצָא רֻבּוֹ), that "the majority [of the fetus] has exited". This is taken to refer to the emergence of the baby during childbirth.

According to Rashi, the reason behind this law is that a fetus is not a viable soul (lav nefesh hu) until it is born, and killing it to save the woman is permitted. Maimonides, though, justified the law not because the fetus is less than a nefesh (human being), as the Talmud held, but rather through the principle of the rodef or pursuer, "pursuing her to kill her." Schiff argues that the Maimonidean view is "unprecedented" and "without doubt, this hitherto unexpressed insight had dramatic potential ramifications for the parameters of permissible abortion." Meir Abulafia and Menachem Meiri reaffirm Rashi's view.

=== Noachide prohibition on abortion ===
Genesis 9:6 says, "Whoever sheds the blood of man, by man shall his blood be shed..." The Talmud understands this verse as alluding to a fetus ("Whoever sheds the blood of man within man, his blood shall be shed") and thus prohibiting abortion to non-Jews.

According to Maimonides, a non-Jew who kills "even one unborn in the womb of its mother" is guilty of murder according to the Noahide Laws, and is liable for the death penalty. The penalty of having his blood spilt, is interpreted by Maimonides as referring to a punishment by the hands of heaven, and not by the courts or man to man.

According to many authorities, this prohibition of murder does not apply throughout the pregnancy, but only (depending on the source) after the 8th, 13th, or 22nd to 23rd week of pregnancy.

Tosafot (11th–13th centuries) discusses the connection between the obligations of Jews and non-Jews. Follows the Talmudic principle that there is nothing that is prohibited to the Noahide that is permissible to Jews, Tosafot concluded abortion must in general be prohibited to Jews also, though the (theoretical) punishment for violations would apply only to gentiles. Conversely, Tosafot suggests that perhaps, since Jews are permitted therapeutic abortions for the sake of maternal life, Noahide law likewise allows non-Jews to undergo therapeutic abortion. Given this near parity, rabbinic law prohibits Jews from assisting gentiles with forbidden abortions, for which the gentiles would be culpable of bloodshed. Viewing Noahide law as a universalizing ethics, Sinclair states: "it is evident that the halakhah in the area of foeticide is shaped by a combination of legal doctrine and moral principle."

The Tosafot text that applies Noahide law to forbid abortion does not go unchallenged. Another commentary in Tosafot (Niddah 44b) appears to question whether foeticide is permitted; however, this is not the plain interpretation of that Tosafot.

=== Legal rulings ===
In the standard code of Jewish law, the Shulchan Aruch, abortion in the case where it would be a risk to the woman is permitted; Maimonides's language, speaking of the fetus as pursuer, is included verbatim. A key commentator, R. Joshua Falk, explains that abortion does not trade off one life for another life because the embryo is "not a person" prior to birth. An ordinary abortion is a violation Jewish Law, as emphasized by R. Ezekiel Landau among others.

Later authorities have differed as to how far one might go in defining the peril to the woman in order to justify abortion, and at what stage of gestation a fetus is considered as having a soul, at which point one life cannot take precedence over another.

In a key responsum, R. Yair Bacharach found it permissible to perform an abortion on a woman who became pregnant after an affair, causing the child resulting from this pregnancy to be classified as a mamzer. R. Bachrach distinguishes early stage from later stage abortions. His reasoning is based on a Talmudic commentary to the effect that Sabbath laws may be violated for a fetus, but only for a later-stage embryo. Several authorities say that Jewish law is less strict for terminating embryos before 40 days. He also concludes that the embryo may be treated as a pursuer rodef, in a case where the mother's life is at risk. Bachrach then offers a novel rationale for denying the requested abortion. He argues the abortion, like certain forms of contraception, frustrates the mitzvah of reproduction and destroys the "seed" needed to be "fruitful and multiply."

== Orthodox Judaism ==
In general, Orthodox Judaism opposes most abortion, but permits it when the pregnancy endangers the woman's life. However, some rabbis have allowed abortions in other circumstances. For example, the Rabbi Eliezer Waldenberg wrote that there is room for leniency if there is a danger to maternal health or severe pain, and permitted abortion of an abnormal fetus before quickening and within three months of conception. Rabbi Eliezer Melamed allowed abortion for people who develop a mental illness due to pregnancy, saying "since emotional illness is generally considered a threat to life, she may abort her fetus to protect her life".

== Conservative Judaism ==
The Rabbinical Assembly Committee on Jewish Law and Standards has ruled that an abortion is valid if a continuation of pregnancy might cause the woman severe physical or psychological harm, or if the foetus is judged by competent medical opinion as severely defective; a foetus is a life in the process of development, and the decision to abort should never be taken lightly. The Conservative position thus follows those of the Acharonim who permit an abortion in case of acute potential emotional and psychological harm.

Before reaching her final decision, Conservative Judaism holds that a woman should consult with the biological father, other members of her family, her physician, her Rabbi, and any other person who can help her in assessing the legal and moral issues involved.

== Reform Judaism ==
Reform Judaism permits abortion when the woman's life is at stake as well as when a pregnancy is "a result of rape or incest, when genetic testing has determined that a child would be born with a disease that would cause death or severe disability and the parents believe that the impending birth will be an impossible situation for them" and for several other reasons. More generally, the "Reform perspective on abortion can be described as follows: Abortion is an extremely difficult choice faced by a woman. In all circumstances, it should be her decision whether or not to terminate a pregnancy, backed up by those whom she trusts (physician, therapist, partner, etc.). This decision should not be taken lightly (abortion should never be used for birth control purposes) and can have life-long ramifications. However, any decision should be left up to the woman within whose body the fetus is growing."

The Reform Movement has actively opposed legislation to restrict the right of women to choose to abort a fetus, especially in situations in which the health of the woman is endangered by continued pregnancy. This pro-abortion rights position has been linked by some Reform authorities to the value that Reform Judaism places upon autonomy—the right of individuals to act as moral agents on their own behalf. In writing against a legal ban on so-called "partial birth abortion," Rabbi David Ellenson, president of the Reform Movement's Hebrew Union College, has written, "This law as it has been enacted unquestionably diminishes the inviolable status and worth that ought to be granted women as moral agents created in the image of God."

== Judaism and abortion politics in the US ==
With the emergence of modern Jewish identity in the late 18th century, Jewish views on abortion have bifurcated along movement lines, especially between Orthodox Judaism and its more liberal counterparts. By the 20th century, liberal-minded Jews were among those most active in the abortion-rights movements. These reproductive rights activists included Betty Friedan, Bernard Nathanson, and Gloria Steinem (however, later in life Nathanson became an anti-abortion activist and converted to Catholicism). In the U.S., a few politically-moderate Republican Jews also have been pro-abortion rights. A few Jewish groups concentrate on abortion issues, both anti-abortion and pro-abortion rights. In the United States, Conservative Judaism, Reconstructionist Judaism and Reform Judaism are usually aligned with the interfaith Religious Coalition for Reproductive Choice. Orthodox organizations such as the Orthodox Union and Agudas Yisrael have occasionally partnered with pro-abortion rights organizations in order to ensure that abortions will be available to women whose lives are endangered by the fetus.

Catholic and Evangelical Christian theologies that promote the idea of the personhood of a fetus dominate political discussion of abortion in the US; however, this is not a concern in Judaism. Some modern Jewish scholars draw a sharp contrast between Christian theologies that oppose abortion and Jewish thought about the moral and ontological status of gestation. Feldman highlights that Talmudic debate over whether the soul achieves immortality upon conception, or at a far later stage, has little bearing on halakhic protections for the fetus because, absent a doctrine of original sin, "abortion would not interfere with the immortal rights or destiny of the foetus."

In 2022, PRRI's poll of Abortion Attitudes in a Post-Roe World found that 79% of Jewish Americans held that abortion should be legal in all or most cases.

=== Jewish support for abortion ===
The National Council of Jewish Women (NCJW) has been a progressive supporter of abortion access and reproductive freedom. NCJW has been a leader in the reproductive health and rights movement so that every person can make "moral and faith-informed decisions about their body, health, and family." NCJW has created resources that explain misconceptions, Hebrew scriptures, and Jewish support regarding Judaism and abortion and their work makes clear that abortion access is an issue of religious freedom. In their work, they advocate for reproductive justice for all people, including marginalized groups who are affected the most by limiting abortion access.

In 2020, the NCJW started a group within their organization called Rabbis for Repro. Rabbis for Repro was created as an avenue for Jewish leadership to speak up for reproductive health, rights, and justice. "Reproductive freedom is a Jewish value" as stated by Rabbis for Repro who call for Jewish leadership to educate communities and act as an ally for communities who need abortion access.

== See also ==
- Abortion in Israel
- Ensoulment#Judaism – Moment a being is said to gain a soul

== Sources ==
=== Jewish sources ===
- Bleich, J. David. "Abortion in halakhic literature" in Contemporary halakhic problems. KTAV, 1977
- Eisenberg, Daniel, M.D. "Stem Cell Research in Jewish Law" 2001. Published at Jlaw.com with note that "This article was reviewed for halachic accuracy by Rabbi Sholom Kaminetsky of the Talmudical Yeshiva of Philadelphia."
- Feldman, David. 1974. Marital Relations, Birth Control, and Abortion in Jewish Law. New York: Schocken Books.
- Jakobovits, Immanuel. 1959. Jewish Medical Ethics. New York: Bloch Publishing.
- Mackler, Aaron L., ed. 2000. Life & Death Responsibilities in Jewish Biomedical Ethics. JTS.
- Meacham (leBeit Yoreh), Tirzah. 27 February 2009. "Abortion", Jewish Women: A Comprehensive Historical Encyclopedia. Jewish Women's Archive.
- Rosner, Fred. 1986. Modern Medicine and Jewish Ethics. New York: Yeshiva University Press.
- Schiff, Daniel. Abortion in Judaism. 2002. Cambridge University Press.
- Sinclair, Daniel. Jewish biomedical law. Oxford
- Steinberg, Avram. 1998. "Abortion and Miscarriage," Encyclopedia Hilchatit Refuit. English edition Encyclopedia of Jewish Medical Ethics (translation by Fred Rosner) 2003. Jerusalem: Feldheim, pp. 1–29 (online source).
