= Joan Friedman =

First female rabbi in Canada

Joan Friedman became the first woman to serve as a rabbi in Canada in 1980, when she was appointed as an Assistant Rabbi at Holy Blossom Temple in Toronto. Her appointment was followed shortly after by that of Elyse Goldstein as Assistant Rabbi from 1983-1986; Goldstein has been called the first female rabbi in Canada, but that is incorrect.

Friedman was ordained in 1980 (before she began as an Assistant Rabbi at Holy Blossom Temple) by the Hebrew Union College-Jewish Institute of Religion in New York. Later she was named solo rabbi at B’nai Israel in Laconia, New Hampshire. She also worked as the Jewish chaplain at Colgate University for six years, as a congregational rabbi in Bloomington, Indiana for five years, and on the faculties of Colgate and American Universities. As of 2003, she was the associate chaplain for Jewish and interfaith life and coordinator of the Program in Ethical Reflection at Carleton College. As of 2016, she was Associate Professor of History and Religious Studies and Chair of Middle Eastern and North African Studies at the College of Wooster.

She studied at the University of Pennsylvania as an undergraduate, and earned master’s and Ph.D. degrees in Jewish history from Columbia University. She received her Ph.D. in 2002, and her dissertation was entitled "Solomon B. Freehof, the ‘Reform Responsa,’ and the Shaping of American Reform Judaism."

== Awards and professional memberships ==
- 2013-2014 Bernard and Audrey Rapoport Fellowship, Jacob Marcus Center, American Jewish Archives
- 2013 National Jewish Book Award Finalist, "Guidance, Not Governance": Rabbi Solomon B. Freehof and Reform Responsa
- Luce Award (College of Wooster, F 2009)
- Fellow, Center for Israel and Jewish Studies, Columbia University (2001–02)
- Dissertation fellowship - Jewish Foundation for Education of Women Fellowship/National Foundation for Jewish Culture (2000–01)
- Bernard and Audrey Rapoport Fellowship, Jacob Marcus Center, American Jewish Archives (2000–01)
- IREX Research Exchange Scholar, Charles University, Prague, Czechoslovak Socialist Republic (1988–89)
- American Academy of Religion
- Association for Jewish Studies
- Midwest Jewish Studies Association
- Central Conference of American Rabbis, Board of Trustees, 2006–08; Responsa Committee, 1994–99; corresponding member 1999-current (as of 2016); Committee on Reform
- Women's Rabbinic Network, founding member; co-coordinator, 1991-3

== Publications ==
- "Guidance, Not Governance": Rabbi Solomon B. Freehof and Reform Responsa, published by Hebrew Union College Press, 2013
- Assorted entries in Lindley, Susan Hill and Eleanor J. Stebner, eds., The Westminster Handbook to Women in American Religious History. Louisville: Westminster John Knox Press, 2008.
- "The Making of a Reform Rabbi: Solomon B. Freehof from Childhood to HUC," American Jewish Archives Journal, 58/1-2 (2006): 1-49.
- "The Writing of Reform Jewish Practice and Its Rabbinic Background," Central Conference of American Rabbis Journal, 51/3 (Summer 2004): 31-71.
- "A Critique of Solomon B. Freehof's Concept of Minhag and Reform Jewish Practice." In Re-examining Progressive Halakhah, Studies in Progressive Halakhah, ed. Walter Jacob and Moshe Zemer, 111-133. NY: Berghahn Books, 2002.
- "A Judaism of Ongoing Search." In Jewish Spiritual Journeys: Essays in Honor of Eugene B. Borowitz on his 70th Birthday, ed. Lawrence A. Hoffman and Arnold Jacob Wolf. NY: Behrman House, 1997.
- "The Last Jews of Czechoslovakia?" Soviet Jewish Affairs 19/1 (May, 1989).
- Viewer's Guide for PBS series "Heritage: Civilization and the Jews," 1983 (Co-author).

== See also ==
- Timeline of women rabbis
