= Religious views on organ donation =

Many different major religious groups and denominations have varying views on organ donation of a deceased and live bodies, depending on their ideologies. Differing opinions can arise depending on if the death is categorized as brain death or cease of the heartbeat. It is important for doctors and health care providers to be knowledgeable about differentiating theological and cultural views on death and organ donations as nations are becoming more multicultural.

== General overview ==
Due to the recent advancements in medical technology, many religious and moral dilemmas have impacted biomedical ethics. It is difficult to reach full consensus on organ donation within each religion.

One of the main problems that has come from these advancements in the past few decades has been defining death, which leads to organ donation and transplantation controversy. In 1968, Harvard medical school defined death as 'irreversible coma.' It is important for healthcare practitioners to understand formal religious views on bioethics and organ donations in multicultural societies so medical advancements can still be aligned with religious views.

Both receiving and donating organs is up to interpretation as there is no direct references to the process in religious texts. Because of this, many scholars, religious authorities and individuals interpret the readings differently. All this allows for different views between religions as well as within major religions. Any religious processes and traditions that occur right after death also affect views on organ donation.

== Christianity ==
Christians generally support organ donation as an altruistic act and leaves the process as an individual decision. The Church of England has stated that organ donation is an act of Christian duty.

=== Catholicism ===
Catholics believe that organ donation is a moral act when carried out with the consent of the donor. The Catechism of the Catholic Church states that:

Organ transplants are in conformity with the moral law if the physical and psychological dangers and risks to the donor are proportionate to the good sought for the recipient. Organ donation after death is a noble and meritorious act and is to be encouraged as a expression of generous solidarity. It is not morally acceptable if the donor or his proxy has not given explicit consent. Moreover, it is not morally admissible to bring about the disabling mutilation or death of a human being, even in order to delay the death of other persons.

=== Jehovah's Witnesses ===
Since Jehovah’s Witnesses are not allowed to accept external blood products, their view on organ donation is complicated by the medical procedure itself. Jehovah’s Witnesses believe that organ donation with no transfusion of blood is an individual decision.

== Islam ==
The majority of Islamic religious leaders accept organ donation during life (provided it does not harm the donor) but not after death. Most religious leaders do not accept brain death as a criterion and consider cessation of all signs of life including heart beat as a precondition for declaring death.

Despite this position by Islamic religious leaders, Muslims are oftentimes uncertain about whether or not Islamic tradition considers organ donation to be forbidden. This uncertainty stems from ambiguity caused by conflicting opinions among some Islamic leaders regarding this issue. Moreover, a lack of support along with a generally negative attitude toward organ donation and transplantation has been reflected in surveys of diverse Islamic populations. This overall negativity towards organ donation has resulted in low rates of participation in organ donation by practicing Muslims even in cases where donation would be considered permissible by religious leaders. The Islamic bioethical concepts of autonomy, beneficence, justice and non-malfeasance is theocentric not anthropocentric and adhere to Shari’a law. Guiding directives of Islam include the right of the community and the right to health.

Shari’a law divides the conduct of human right into two categories: Huquq-Allah, right of God, and Huquq al-Ibad, right of the individual. The primary sources of Shari’a law are the Quran and Sunnah, and this is enforced by Ijtihad.

Muslims believe that humans do not have ownership of their body or spirit, as it is considered to be God's gift. Judges of organ donation ethics question whether the noble act of donating an organ outweighs the desecration of a dead body. Additionally, some Muslims believe that all body parts must be present on the Day of Judgement and organ donations would interfere with that testimony.

Many Ayatollahs view organ donations differently. For example, Grand Ayatollahs Ali al-Sistani did not approve of posthumous organ donation, while Grand Ayatollahs Abu al-Qasim al-Khoei allowed donation of all organs after death as long as the body could still be recognizable. Practicers of Shia Islam consider minor, regenerative organ donations different than major, non-regenerative organs.

Some points of view that Muslims hold are based on the Prophet Muhammad's teachings. The quote, "Whoever helps another will be granted help from Allah in the Hereafter" has been interpreted by some Muslims in support of organ donation.

Theological influences are particularly strong in the Muslim community and many refer to the work of the Organization of the Islamic Conference (OIC) and the Muslim World League (MWL), two Pan-Islamic transnational committees that debate and decide on bioethical topics. The MWL is composed of professional experts representing diverse fields of study and the OIC is composed solely of Islamic scholars. These two highly influential organizations independently attempted to produce a conclusion in respect to brain death. The OIC convened to produce a solution that balanced different views and accepted the brain death concept in 1986, officially equating it with cardiopulmonary failure. Consequently, the OIC permitted cadaveric organ transplantations in 1988. The MWL referenced the work of the OIC and allows for the artificial respirator to be turned off in the case of brain death, however, it did not accept brain death as the final indicator of death. The MWL accepted organ transplantation before the OIC in 1985, and permits it on the condition that death is established via cardiopulmonary failure. In 1996, the United Kingdom Muslim Law Council declared that organ donation coincides with Islamic beliefs.

=== Egypt ===
In recent decades, organ transplantation has become a major topic of disagreement in Egypt. The Egyptian Parliament has not yet been able to develop an organ transplant program or any other laws concerning the subject. Most of the opposition comes from the existence of a black market and organ theft that has tainted the view citizens have on organ donation. Since Muslims believe organs belong to God, proponents suggest it is God who ultimately saves the patient and opponents suggest that one can not donate an organ that they themselves do not own. Muhammad Metwali Al Shaarawy was a popular figure in Egypt whose quote, "How can you give a kidney that you yourself do not own?" influenced Egyptian views on organ donation.

=== Iran ===
In Iran, a Muslim-majority nation, laws have been passed in which monetary compensation for kidney donation is legal under regulation.

== Judaism ==
Like Islam, the body requires burial within 24 hours to 6 months so the body is lighter of death and any unnecessary interference with the body should be avoided. The Jewish Law, Halakha, discusses the moral obligation (mitzvah) of saving one's life, which many scholars and rabbis consider to outweigh the consequences of interfering with one's body.

Mishnah Sanhedrin 4:5

“It was for this reason that man was first created as one person [Adam], to teach you that anyone who destroys a life is considered by Scripture to have destroyed an entire world; and anyone who saves a life as if he has saved an entire world.”

This quote represents pikuach nefesh, which is the term used in Jewish Law for saving one’s life and overrides any other regulations in Jewish law that would prohibit organ donations.

Jewish medical ethics takes a unique approach. It encourages live organ donation, such as kidney transplant, partial liver lobe (Adult/Child) transplant and the like, when two basic conditions are met, firstly, that the operation does not (significantly) endanger the life of the donor, and secondly, that the recipient's life will be saved through this donation. However, opinions are divided on the issue of organ donations which will permanently end the donor's heart beating, in a case when the donor is brain dead. According to one school of thought, the definition of death is indicated by irreversible cessation of heart beat. Hence, this view does not allow vital organs to be removed from a brain dead patient, as stopping the heart from beating is, in their view, tantamount to killing. Conversely, the other school of thought (which include many Orthodox rabbis and Israel's Chief Rabbinate) the determination of death is based on brain function irrespective of a beating heart. Therefore, according to their view, removing vital organs from a brain dead patient for the sake of saving a life, is in fact permissible, and even encouraged.

As a result of these two orthodox schools of thought, Orthodox Jewish ethics remains divided over key death-related policies. Tactically, opponents to the brain death criterion have requested waivers from state law, as a matter of religious freedom, so as to continue relying on traditional indicators. Meanwhile, proponents of the brain death criterion, such as Halachic Organ Donor Society have been active in advocating organ donations and transplants either at brain death or even at cessation of heart beat, where donation of corneas and skin is still medically possible.

=== Israel ===
Israel used a committee of medical and religious authorities in order to create laws regarding organ donation. Two laws were enacted in 2008. First, the Brain-Respiratory Death Law states conditions that determines the conditions necessary to determine brain death. It also allows for both brain death and cease of the heartbeat as acceptable deaths. Second, the Organ Transplantation Law, fully implemented in 2012, addresses the legality and ethics of organ donation in Israel. The law states that organ trade and donor compensation are illegal.

A nonprofit NGO called Matnat Chaim was created in Israel in order to promote live-donor kidney transplantation. Their goal is to be in accordance with Jewish law and states that the act is considered a laudatory one.

Only about 10% of the Israeli population owns an organ donor card.

== Buddhism ==
The spiritual consciousness remaining in the body after death leads to discrepancy on organ donation in the Buddhist community. Issues with defining a diagnosis of brainstem death also provides contradictions in organ donation views.

The Buddha is believed to have sacrificed himself by jumping into a fire in order to nourish a lost and starved villager in woods, in a previous life as a rabbit. This bodhisattva value of compassion is also expressed through organ donation by putting another person’s wellness above one’s own. Donations made based on monetary or societal motivation are not valued by Buddhists.

A person’s spiritual consciousness continues through the path of the bardo and rebirth after death. Some believe that since physical organs are useless after death, donating them is an act of great compassion. Other’s believe that in order to ensure positive rebirth, the dying individual should not be disturbed. However, organs have to be harvested right after brain death is declared in order to be useful. These considerations allow for differentiating views depending on the individual.

The choice of making the donation has to be made by the donor him/herself according to Buddhism. It's not clear brain death is a form of death according to Buddhism. But if it considered as death, in which case one cannot make decision oneself, it may or may not be a good deed for one who died and also for the ones involved in decision making and contributing. Some Buddhists believe in the value of compassion, in which actions such as organ donation can be used to overcome the sufferings of life.

Buddhism generally accepts brainstem death and the irreversible ability for respiration as a valid criteria for death of a human being. A living body or a dead body in Japanese culture is considered to be the permanent carrier of the soul. This belief has made it hard to develop a unanimous agreement on brain death in Japan.

Many Buddhists in Eastern Asia adopt the Confucian taboos that are against destruction or disfiguring the human body. Because of this view, many countries in East Asia have low rates of organ donation.

Because Hawai’i has a large Asian population, these cultural and religious ideals can be reflected in their participation in organ donation. As a state, they have the lowest rate of organ donations compared the rest of the United States.

Tibetan Buddhists believe the spirit may remain in the body until about a week after death, therefore organ donation can be seen as interfering with the next rebirth. Pure Land Buddhism is a branch of Mahayana Buddhism that is against organ donation. They believe that the soul should be able to leave peacefully towards the path of rebirth. Since the soul takes time to depart from the physical body, they believe the body should not be disturbed when brain death is declared. In Korea and Taiwan, organ donation is successfully adopted.

== Hinduism ==
In Hinduism, the physical integrity of the body after death is not considered important. Hindu values reincarnation and prolonging life which allows for many individuals to agree with organ donation.

Life after death is a strong belief of Hinduism and is an ongoing process of rebirth. It is a perpetual circle of birth and rebirth of the soul, so the physical body is insignificant. The effects of this view on the concept of organ donation and transplantation in Hinduism are various. Other Dharmic faiths hold similar views.

== Jainism ==
In Jainism, compassion and charity are considered to be major virtues. Organ donation has been widely supported by the Jain community leaders and monks. It has been reported that in Mumbai, 85-90% of all organ donations including eye donations, are by Jains and Gujaratis (a significant fraction of them are Jain in Mumbai). Gujarat has had considerable success with the eye donation program due to a significant population of the Jain community, which considers eye donation as a sublime form of charity.
