= Organ donation in Jewish law =

Certain fundamental Jewish law questions arise in issues of organ donation. Donation of an organ from a living person to save another's life, where the donor's health will not appreciably suffer, is permitted and encouraged in Jewish law. Donation of an organ from a dead person is equally permitted for the same purpose: to save a life (pikuach nefesh). This simple statement of the issue belies, however, the complexity of defining death in Jewish law. Thus, although there are side issues regarding mutilation of the body etc., the primary issue that prevents organ donation from the dead amongst Jews, in many cases, is the definition of death, simply because to take a life-sustaining organ from a person who was still alive would be murder.

Because in Jewish law, organ donation raises such difficult questions, it has traditionally been met with some skepticism. In both Orthodox Judaism and non-Orthodox Judaism, the majority view holds that organ donation is certainly permitted in the case of irreversible cardiac rhythm cessation. Many rabbis, such as rabbi Moshe Tendler consider brainstem death (believing this is the opinion held by his father-in-law Moshe Feinstein), where respiration and heart rhythm are artificially maintained, to be considered death. However, other rabbis disagree.

Because most organs must be transplanted before the heart has ceased, the debate over brain whilst there continues to be opposition to transplantation before cardiac/respiratory death, there are several authorities which argue that it is allowed, and this is now the official position of the government of the State of Israel and its Chief Rabbinate.

== Relevant principles of Jewish Law ==
In judging cases for organ donation, rabbis apply a range of Jewish principles and consider precedents concerning the donor. In Judaism, almost all acts are permissible in order to save the life of another, provided the risk of that person's death is real and immediate (pikuach nefesh) – the only acts not permissible are blood shedding, forbidden sexual relations, and idolatry.

If the donor is living then he may not donate an organ where this will risk his death, even if this is to save the life of another. However, where there will be no appreciable detriment to his health, he may do so, and some even argue he is obligated.

=== Determination of death ===
Another major debate around organ donation concerns with the definition of death. If the accepted definition if death is "incorrect", removing a heart from a donor who was established dead under the "wrong" criteria is considered tantamount to murder.

According to some, Jewish law defines death as a state of complete and irreversible cessation of cardiorespiratory function followed by a minimum of five minutes' waiting during which it is not restored (period of time depends on custom). After five minutes blood flow to organs have ceased, at which time it removal of organs to save a life is permitted according to some rabbinical opinions. Some opinions define death as solely the irreversible cessation of breathing, and some define death as the irreversible cessation of the heartbeat—which is the majority, long standing accepted opinion.

In 1968, a Harvard committee decided on a set of criteria for irreversible coma, or brain stem death. Regarding the point at which a person is considered dead in the case of brain-stem death with a ventilator machine causing heartbeat, a definitive consensus from halachic authorities has not been reached as of today. However increasing numbers of orthodox authorities accept brain stem death with various stringencies, enabling surgeons to take full advantage of modern medical technology in transplantations of organs from the deceased. Israel, in particular, passed organ donation laws in 2008 with the full support of its Chief Rabbinate.

=== Terminally-ill donors ===
Another issue of organ donation concerning the donor is the prohibition against touching a goses. A goses is a halachic category ascribed to people who are critically ill and expected to die within a brief period, typically three days. Jewish law forbids touching the body of a goses for fear that any sudden movement may accelerate the time of death. For this reason, there may be reluctance to medically intervene (preparing patient for organ donation) with an imminently dying patient solely for the purpose of preparing them for organ donation.

== Types of organ transplants and Jewish law ==
=== Artificial organs ===
Transplants with artificial organs do not pose any problems in Jewish law (with the exception of artificial heart transplants), as long as the prospects for success are greater than the risks. Therefore, there is no conflict with Jewish law against artificial heart valves, bone parts, joints, and use of dialysis. Artificial heart transplants are not permissible according to Jewish law due to low success rates and the serious medical complications involved. Medical science has not reached the point of being able to use artificial organs or animal organs as protocol for transplantation.

=== Blood and bone marrow ===
According to Jewish law application, it is permissible to donate blood and bone marrow tissue because there is almost no danger or risk to the donor, and these tissues regenerate quickly.

=== Heart ===
For successful heart and liver transplants the donor's heart must still be beating. There is the important issue of determining the moment of death to permit heart transplantation. As stated, some rabbis prohibit removal of an organ from a brain-dead patient, making it impossible to perform heart transplants. Other rabbis accept the criterion for brain stem death and allow organ transplantation to immediately save a life.

=== Kidney ===
After kidney donation, the donor lives with one kidney and there is a small risk associated with the surgery. Whether a person is obligated to endanger his own life to any degree to save another person's life who is critically ill is a critical question in Jewish rulings. Therefore, there are some rabbinical opinions that prohibit kidney donation from live donors. Other rabbis allow it as an act of piety, and others believe it is an obligation not to violate a precept, "Thou shall not stand idly by the blood of thy fellow man."

=== Lungs ===
The lobe of lung transplantation is not common from living donors because the morbidity and mortality risk to the donor is felt to be excessive. Non-living lung donations are more commonly used.

=== Skin ===
Many rabbis who allow organ donation for life-saving organs extend this to allow preserving human skin from cadavers in skin banks for future use for burn victims.

== Orthodox opposition ==
Haredim (ultra-Orthodox Jews) in Israel have issued an anti-organ-donor or "life" card which is intended to ensure that organs are not removed from the bearer after brain death or brain stem death. It states: "I do not give my permission to take from me, not in life or in death, any organ or part of my body for any purpose."

Many Haredi leaders say that they are only opposed to it under certain circumstances.

== See also ==
- Religious views on organ donation
- Organ transplantation in Israel

== Sources ==
- International Rabbinic Fellowship. Halakhic Realities: Collected Essays on Organ Donation. Zev Farber, ed. Jerusalem: Maggid Books 2017.
- Elliot N. Dorff. Matters of Life and Death:A Jewish Approach to Modern Medical Ethics. Philadelphia and Jerusalem: Jewish Publication Society 1998. pp. xix, 476. ISBN 0-8276-0647-8
- Jakobovits, Immanuel. 1959. Jewish Medical Ethics. New York: Bloch Publishing. pp. 285–291
- Lau, Y. "The sale of organs for transplantation" (Hebrew), Tehumin 18:125–136, 1998
- Joseph Prouser. "Organ and Tissue Donation Card" in Mackler, Aaron L., ed. 2000. Life & Death Responsibilities in Jewish Biomedical Ethics. JTS.
- Ramirez, Anthony. "Medicine Meets Religion in Organ Donation Debate." The New York Times, 18 November 2006, Vol. 156 Issue 53767, p. B2, (AN 23283799)
- Sinclair, Daniel. Jewish Biomedical Law. Oxford Univ. Press, 2003 (Chapter 6)
- Twersky, Abraham, Michael Gold, and Walter Jacob. 1991. "Jewish Perspectives." pp. 187–98 in New Harvest: Transplanting the Body and Reaping the Benefits, edited by C. Don Keyes and Walter E. Wiest. Clifton, NJ: Hurnana Press.
- Stephen J. Werber. "Ancient Answers to Modern Questions: Death, Dying, and Organ Transplants – A Jewish Law Perspective", Cleveland State University Journal of Law and Health, 1996 / 1997, v.11
- Cohen, Alfred. "Sale or donation of human organs." Journal of Halacha and Contemporary Society, 2006.
- Fink, Reuven. "Halachic Aspects of Organ Transplantation." Journal of Halacha and Contemporary Society, 1983.
