= Religious philosophy =

Philosophical thinking inspired by a particular religion

Religious philosophy is philosophical thinking that is influenced and directed as a consequence of teachings from a particular religion. It can be done objectively, but it may also be done as a persuasion tool by believers in that faith. Religious philosophy is concerned with the nature of religion, theories of salvation, and conceptions of god, gods, and/or the divine.

Due to the historical development of religions, many religions share commonalities concerning their philosophies. These philosophies are often considered to be universal and include beliefs about concepts such as the afterlife, souls, and miracles.

== Philosophical commonalities ==
Religious faith and philosophical reflection are closely interconnected. Religious traditions influence the philosophical thinking and beliefs of adherents within a given religion.

Many philosophical commonalities among religions have emerged from shared historical foundations. For example, the Abrahamic religions—including Judaism, Christianity, Islam, Baháʼí Faith, Yazidism, Druze, Samaritanism, and Rastafari—share a number of philosophical themes, although these concepts are expressed differently in their respective religious texts.

In addition, some philosophical concepts and forms of reasoning found in religious teachings appear to have developed independently while nevertheless exhibiting notable similarities and analogous ideas. For instance, arguments concerning the existence of an omniscient god or multiple gods appear in several religious traditions, including Christianity, Islam, and Hinduism. Similarly, the philosophical concept of free will is present in both monotheistic and polytheistic religions.

== Types ==
=== Intuitive religious philosophy ===
Many religious concepts are described as "cross-culturally ubiquitous" because they are considered "cognitively natural." These concepts are regarded as intuitive in that they tend to arise with little explicit direction, instruction, or formal teaching during early stages of cognitive development and do not necessarily originate from specific cultural instruction. Examples of such religious concepts include beliefs concerning the afterlife, souls, supernatural agents, and miraculous events.

=== Reflective religious philosophy ===
Some religious concepts require deliberate instruction to ensure their transmission within a community. These beliefs are categorized as reflective and are often encoded in linguistic or doctrinal forms that facilitate communication and preservation. Reflective religious philosophies are understood to play a significant role in the maintenance and continuity of cultural and religious traditions. Examples of reflective religious philosophies include concepts such as karma, divine immanent justice or providence, as well as theological doctrines such as the Trinity in Christianity and Brahman in Hinduism.

== God ==
Religious philosophy is largely concerned with conceptions of God, gods, or the divine.

=== Ontological arguments ===
Ontological arguments are a class of philosophical arguments that rely on reason alone to conclude that God exists. Numerous philosophers have contributed to the development of various ontological arguments.

In the 11th century CE, Saint Anselm of Canterbury (1033–1109) formulated an ontological argument in his work Proslogion. His reasoning was based on the idea of God as "that than which nothing greater can be conceived."

Thomas Aquinas (c. 1225–1274) incorporated philosophical reasoning into Christian theology, using philosophy as a means of addressing questions about the existence of God. In his Summa Theologica, Aquinas presents five arguments for the existence of God, commonly referred to as the quinque viae or "Five Ways."

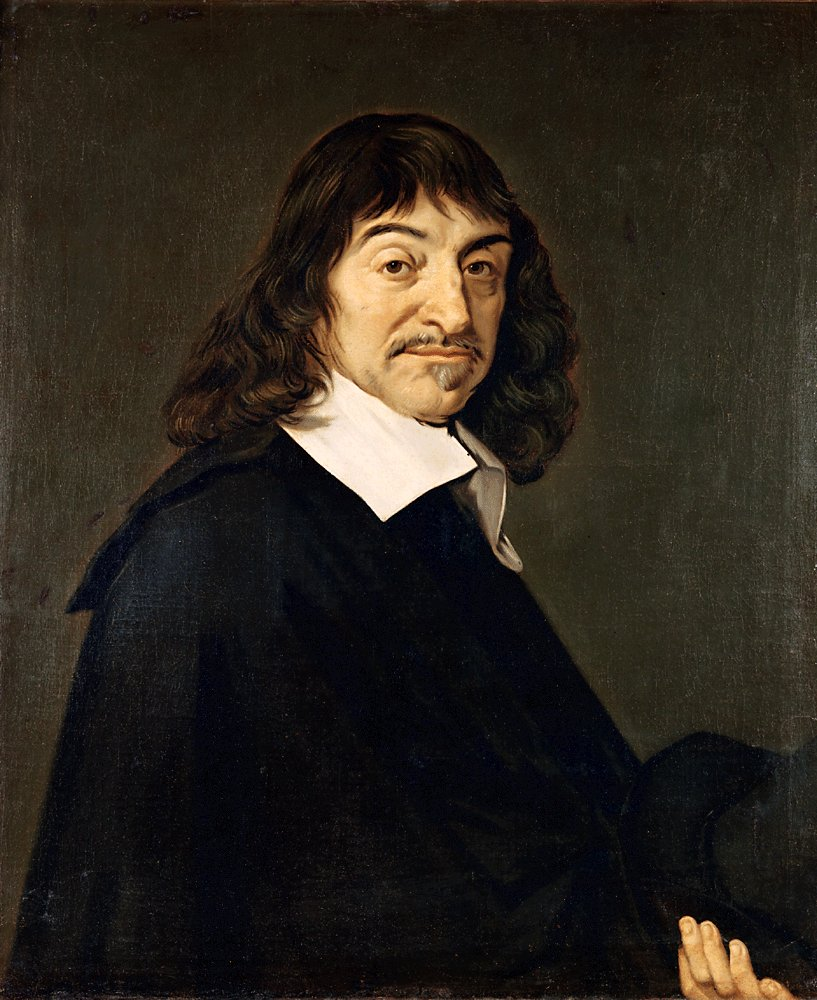
Portrait of René Descartes

In the 17th century, René Descartes (1596–1650) proposed ontological arguments similar to those of Anselm. In his Fifth Meditation, Descartes argues that the idea of a supremely perfect being entails its existence, on the grounds that necessary existence is a defining attribute of such a being.

Two commonly cited formulations of Descartes' ontological argument are as follows:

Version A

- Whatever is clearly and distinctly perceived to be contained in the idea of a thing is true of that thing.
- Necessary existence is clearly and distinctly perceived to be contained in the idea of God.
- Therefore, God exists.

Version B

- There exists an idea of a supremely perfect being, that is, a being possessing all perfections.
- Necessary existence is a perfection.
- Therefore, a supremely perfect being exists.

In the 18th century, Gottfried Leibniz (1646–1716) further developed Descartes' ontological argument by addressing the issue of whether the concept of a supremely perfect being is coherent. Leibniz argued that perfections are mutually compatible and can therefore coexist within a single being, thereby supporting the argument's validity.

More recent philosophers, including Kurt Gödel, Charles Hartshorne, Norman Malcolm, and Alvin Plantinga, have proposed ontological arguments that elaborate on or modify earlier formulations by thinkers such as Anselm, Descartes, and Leibniz. For example, Kurt Gödel (1906–1978) employed modal logic to formalize and expand upon Leibniz's version of Anselm's argument in what is known as Gödel's ontological proof.

=== Concept of God ===
An individual's conception of God has been shown to influence religious coping styles. Research has identified several religiously affiliated coping styles:

- Self-directing style: Individuals address problems independently without directly involving God.
- Deferring style: Individuals defer responsibility for problem-solving to God.
- Collaborative style: Individuals and God are viewed as jointly involved in the problem-solving process.
- Surrender style: Individuals work collaboratively with God while prioritizing divine guidance over personal control.

== Bioethics ==
=== Medical care ===
An individual's religious philosophy can play a significant role in medical care and healthcare decision-making, and consideration of these beliefs may contribute to improved quality of care. In particular, within palliative care, awareness of diverse religious and philosophical frameworks can assist healthcare providers in addressing patients' spiritual needs appropriately. Religious philosophy is also a relevant consideration in psychotherapeutic approaches to psychiatric disorders. Considerations surrounding organ donation after death are likewise influenced by an individual's religious philosophy.

=== Diet ===
Many religions prescribe or encourage specific dietary practices. For example, vegetarian diets are commonly observed by adherents of Buddhism, Hinduism, and the Seventh-day Adventist Church. The ethical principle of ahimsa (non-injury to living beings), central to Buddhist and Hindu philosophy, emphasizes the sanctity of life and has influenced vegetarian traditions. This principle encompasses both human and animal life and is also associated with beliefs such as reincarnation.

Fasting practices, which may involve abstaining from certain foods or refraining from eating for specified periods, are observed in several religious traditions, including those of the Church of Jesus Christ of Latter-day Saints, Eastern Orthodoxy, Islam, and Roman Catholicism.

Some religious traditions require food to be prepared or consumed with invocation of God's name. In Islam, for example, meat must come from properly slaughtered animals considered permissible (halal), while the consumption of certain animals, such as scavenger species, is prohibited. Islamic dietary laws, derived from the commandments of Allah as outlined in the Quran and the Sunnah of Muhammad, emphasize purity, with dietary practices intended to promote both physical and spiritual cleanliness. Similarly, Jewish kosher dietary laws are derived from religious texts such as the Torah and the Mishnah.

=== Euthanasia ===
Attitudes toward euthanasia are influenced by religious philosophy. Opposition to the legalization of euthanasia and physician-assisted suicide is frequently associated with religious beliefs. Studies indicate that individuals who believe in God as an entity that controls destiny are more likely to oppose the legalization of euthanasia and physician-assisted suicide. Religions such as Christian Science, the Church of Jesus Christ of Latter-day Saints, Hinduism, Islam, Jehovah's Witnesses, and the Seventh-day Adventist Church generally oppose or do not practice euthanasia.

=== Abortion ===
Many religions attribute significant philosophical value to human life and therefore oppose abortion. However, some religious traditions permit abortion under specific circumstances, such as cases involving rape or when the life of the pregnant woman is at risk.

== Religions ==
Religious philosophy influences many aspects of an individual's worldview and approach to life. For example, empirical studies focusing on the philosophical concept of spirituality at or near the end of life in India have found that individuals who follow Indian philosophical traditions are influenced by these frameworks in their perceptions of spirituality.

Considerations related to medical care, death, diet, and pregnancy vary among adherents of different religions due to their respective philosophical traditions.

=== Islamic philosophy ===
Islamic philosophy generally prohibits the violation of the human body, while also emphasizing altruism and the preservation of life:

And whoever saves one—it is as if he had saved mankind entirely. (Quran 5:32)

Organ donation is generally supported within Islamic ethics, based on the principle of necessity overriding prohibition (al-darurat tubih al-mahzurat). Objections to organ donation within Muslim communities are often attributed to cultural rather than theological considerations, as Islamic principles allow exceptions for medical necessity, including the use of porcine-derived medical products such as bone grafts and insulin.

Formal rulings supporting organ donation have been issued by Islamic authorities, including a 1996 ijtihad by the UK Muslim Law Council and a 1988 ruling by the Islamic Jurisprudence Assembly Council in Saudi Arabia, with similar decisions made in Egypt, Iran, and Pakistan.

Islamic jurisprudence does not permit voluntary death, including euthanasia or physician-assisted suicide. Life is regarded as a sacred gift from Allah, who alone determines its duration. The moment of death (ajal) is believed to be beyond human control, and any form of intentional hastening of death is prohibited. Although the Qur'an states, "Nor take life—which Allah has made sacred—except for just cause" (Quran 17:33), hadith literature further reinforces the prohibition of euthanasia, even in cases of severe suffering.

=== Christian philosophy ===
Christian philosophical traditions generally support organ donation, although theological reasoning and acceptance vary among denominations. Christian theologians often reference biblical teachings emphasizing altruism and self-sacrifice, including:

Heal the sick, cleanse the lepers, raise the dead, cast out devils: freely you have received, freely give. (Matthew 10:8)

Greater love has no one than this: to lay down one's life for one's friends. (John 15:13)

Most Christian scholars consider organ transplantation an act of charity and selflessness. In 1990, the Catholic Church and several Protestant denominations jointly endorsed organ donation as an expression of Christian love.

=== Jewish philosophy ===
Jewish philosophy places significant importance on the intact burial of the deceased, based on halakhic principles. However, the principle of saving a life (pikuach nefesh) overrides nearly all other commandments.

Whoever destroys a soul, it is considered as if he destroyed an entire world. And whoever saves a life, it is considered as if he saved an entire world. (Babylonian Talmud, Sanhedrin 37a)

As a result, organ donation is supported by most Jewish authorities.

Jewish legal traditions generally prohibit abortion, foeticide, and infanticide, viewing them as violations of human life. However, rabbinical sources permit abortion when the mother's life or health is endangered, prioritizing her well-being over that of the fetus. Jewish law does not permit abortion in cases of rape or incest.

=== Hindu philosophy ===
Hindu philosophical traditions generally prohibit abortion in accordance with Dharmashastra texts. Hindu beliefs regarding conception hold that both physical and spiritual attributes, including an individual's past karma, are present from the moment of conception and enter the human embryo.

=== Buddhist philosophy ===
Buddhist philosophical traditions, similar to Hindu views, generally regard abortion as morally problematic in accordance with the Five Precepts. However, intention (cetana) plays a significant role in ethical evaluation, and some Buddhist interpretations allow abortion under circumstances where compassionate intent is emphasized.

=== Taoist philosophy ===
Taoist philosophy emphasizes balance between human populations and natural resources. These principles influenced population management policies in China, including the one-child policy. Abortion is generally discouraged in Taoist thought, as it is believed to disrupt bodily harmony and negate the body's natural capacity to generate life.

== See also ==
- Aztec philosophy – School of philosophy that developed out of Aztec culture
- Buddhist philosophy – Buddhist philosophical tradition
- Christian philosophy – Philosophy carried out by Christians
- Hindu philosophy – Philosophical traditions of Hinduism and the Vedas
- Islamic philosophy – Philosophical tradition in Muslim culture
- Jain philosophy – Indian philosophical tradition within Jainism
- Jewish philosophy – Philosophy carried out by Jews or in relation to the religion of Judaism
- Sikh philosophy – Religion originating in Punjab, India
- Taoist philosophy – Various philosophical traditions of Taoism
- Zoroastrian philosophy – Iranian religion founded by Zoroaster
