= Hiddush =

Novel interpretation or approach to something

In Rabbinic literature, ḥiddush (Hebrew: חִדּוּשׁ; plural ḥiddushim, Hebrew: חִדּוּשׁים) (Note: Often translated into English as novellae. Also transliterated as chiddush, chidush or hidush.) refers to a novel interpretation or approach to previously-existing ideas or works. The term often describes a form of innovation that is made inside the system of Halakha, as distinguished from shinuy, an innovation outside tradition.

== Etymology ==
Ḥiddush comes from the Hebrew root ח-ד-שׁ, meaning new. The usage of the word in this context originated from the language of Talmudic analysis and argumentation in the Gemara. It passed into Yiddish, where it is at times used informally.

== In rabbinic literature ==
Nachmanides states that it is an "obligation imposed upon us to search through the subjects of the Torah and the precepts and bring to light their hidden contents".

What "powers" ḥiddushim? MaaYana Shel Torah asks regarding "VaYayLech Moshe" (31:1)—where did he go? and answers that he went into everyone: NichNas Moshe Rabbeinu LeToch ToCho Shel Kol Adam MiYisroel. This, he writes, is the basis of people having/writing ChiDuShim.

Although "any ḥiddush (novel idea) which a reputable disciple will ever come up with was already given to Moses by Sinai," in one rabbi's understanding of a particular ruling, he wrote: "I have always understood Rabbi Feinstein to be insisting on a balance between innovation and tradition."

Ḥiddushim are the ongoing results of a process and, as a form of K’vod Hatorah, we're required not to forget them. New ways to recall what we learn can be a form of ḥiddush.

=== Rulings vs. understanding ===
There is a difference between issuing a ruling, meaning to "distinguish the case at hand from the precident [sic]... to solve a problem," and an understanding of something. Even in the latter case, he writes "What Rabbi Feinstein means is that one should not be innovative (mechadesh) just to innovate."

- Although it is a Torah command for Kohanim to bless the people, there might be a ḥiddush whether it is obligatory upon those who are not Kohanim to make themselves available to receive these blessings.
- Can always be new? Psalm (27:4) has King David asking that he "dwell.. and visit.." Which is it? Rabbi Yissocher Frand explains the experience as "The Pitfall of Consistency: Been There, Done That." This question is so important that it is a notable part of what many add to the daily prayer service, "twice daily from Rosh Chodesh Elul until Shemini Atzeret".

== Forms of ḥiddush ==
=== Notarikon ===
One form is called Notarikon.

Shabbat (שַׁבָּת), the Sabbath, is a day of rest. The word is spelled with 3 Hebrew letters.
The Notarikon of the three-word phrase "Shayna b'Shabbat Taanug" (שינה בשבת תענוג) (translation: "(Extra) Sleep on Shabbat is considered a Delight!") spells Shabbat (שַׁבָּת).

By itself it might seem like at best a minor ḥiddush. When published amidst a collection of many other such 3-word phrases about the day of rest, the title has justified use of the plural form: ḥiddushim.

=== Gematria ===
Another is finding a Gematria.

=== Lechadesh (to renew) ===
The above term points to a need for something "old" to be seen in a new light. A multi-volume commentary on Mesillas Yesharim compares and contrasts this to emotional insight, a type of Chidush where "something which is novel emotionally" illuminates the value of an idea one already knew intellectually, and brings "a new internalization".

== History ==
Among the first post-Geonic writers of ḥiddushim are:

- Joseph ibn Migash wrote the first published cḥidushim incorporating commentaries on halakha in the Talmud
- Abraham ben David de Posquières (RABaD)
- Meir ben Todros HaLevi Abulafia (c. 1170 – 1244)
- Nachmanides was the first to write ḥiddushim on the Chumash.

By the late sixteenth century, with printing an established technology, hair-splitting distinctions into the treatment of halakic-Talmudic themes became more frequent, with ḥiddush-driven works such as those by:

- Rabbi Meir Lublin, MaHaRam, author of Chiddushe Maharam Lublin
- Solomon Luria ("MaHaRSHaL")
- Rabbi Samuel Eliezer Edels ("MeHaRSHA")

A counter-intuitive use of the term was the Chasam Sofer's novel interpretation of the phrase Chadash asur min haTorah, ("'new' is forbidden by the Torah"). The phrase as originally used is regarding the laws of keeping kosher, whereas his use was regarding changes being made by the Reform movement in Europe: it was a way of saying no—but using a pun.

== Current usage ==
In its regular, contemporary, use, ḥiddush means a novel or innovative (or unusual) idea or point; examples:

- "I once learned a very useful chidush (novel idea) in the name of Harav Moshe Feinstein zt"l, concerning ..."
- "He is famous for his original insights on ..." (review: Rabbi Dovid Feinstein - Kol Dodi On Torah)

and similarly, book titles may be of the following form:

- The work known as Chidushei HaRim, uses the Hebrew word ḥiddushei in the possessive form, and means "ḥiddushim of"
- thus, an English language form is "ḥiddushim of (name of person)", with translation "Novellae of...".

Ḥiddush has to some extent become assimilated into American English; and the word—particularly in "Yinglish"—is also commonly used in an ironic or humorous fashion, so as to imply that the statement in question is "nothing new".
