= Philosophy in religion =

Philosophy in religion may refer to:

- Religious philosophy, philosophical thinking inspired or directed by a particular religion
- Philosophy of religion, the philosophical examination of religion and religious traditions
- Theology, the study of religious beliefs, with a focus on the nature of divinity
