= Lillian Freehof =

American writer

Lillian Simon Freehof (1906 – November 24, 2004) was an American writer.

== Biography ==
Lillian Simon was one of four children, and grew up in a town outside of Chicago where the majority of her neighbors were of Scandinavian descent. Her father was printer of a newspaper, and early in her life she worked for him as a proofreader. She attended the University of Wisconsin and, later, the University of Pittsburgh, studying psychology and taking a degree in English. Secretary of the K. A. M. Temple in Chicago, she married rabbi Solomon Freehof in 1934. That year, he became rabbi of the Rodef Shalom congregation in Pittsburgh, remaining in the role until 1966. Besides serving as rebbetzin, Lillian took to writing, producing a number of works for children that drew upon the aggadah. She also wrote The Right Way (1957), a book to teach ethics in religious schools. She was possessed of a talent for crochet, as well, and produced books on crafts for an adult audience. In the 1930s, she led other women of Rodef Shalom in the task of developing programs aimed at the blind; this included creating services using Braille prayer books, a program which would serve as a model for others throughout the United States. She also wrote short plays about Jewish holidays designed to be performed in the synagogue. She served with the United Jewish Federation and with a variety of other charities, and was at one time on the national board of the Federation of Temple Sisterhoods. The Freehofs had no children.

== Selected works ==
- The Bible Legend Book (1948)
- Candle Light Stories (1951)
- Stories of King David (1952)
- Second Bible Legend Book (1952)
- The Captive Rabbi: The Story of R. Meir of Rothenburg (1965)
- Embroideries and Fabrics for Synagogue and Home (1966)

== Awards ==
- 1953: National Jewish Book Award for Stories of King David
