= Mordechai Halperin =

Israeli physician

- מרדכי הלפרין
- Born: 1946 (age 79–80); Jerusalem, Mandatory Palestine
- Education: Hebrew University of Jerusalem; Hadassah Medical School
- Occupation: Government physician
- Employer: Ministry of Health

Mordechai Halperin (Hebrew: מרדכי הלפרין; born 1946) is an Israeli rabbi, physician and scientist. He is the chief officer of medical ethics for the Israeli Ministry of Health and director of the Falk Schlesinger Institute for Medical-Halachic Research in Jerusalem. He is also a member of the Bioethics Advisory Committee of the Israel Academy of Sciences and Humanities.

== Biography ==
Mordechai Halperin was born in Jerusalem. He studied at the Ponevezh yeshiva and served as lieutenant colonel in the Israeli army. He received his rabbinical ordination in 1966. He received a B.Sc. in mathematics and physics from the Hebrew University of Jerusalem in 1974. In 1987, he received a degree in medicine from the Hebrew University and Hadassah Medical School. He lives in Jerusalem with his wife and six children.

== Rabbinical and teaching career ==
Halperin has taught at several rabbinical academies including the Rabbinical College of the Golan Heights, where he served as Dean.

== Medical career ==
From 1986 to 2000, Halperin worked at various medical centers throughout Israel and served as director of the Jerusalem Medical Center for Impotence & Infertility. He is one of the founding members of the Israeli Medical Ethics Society and a member of many other ethics committees. He is the chief editor of Assia, the Hebrew quarterly review of medical ethics and Jewish law, and editor of Jewish Medical Ethics (JME), an international journal published in English - journals published by the Shlesinger Institute. He is a member of the Academic Coalition for Jewish Bioethics, and has authored more than 200 articles.
