= Moshe Zemer =

American-born Israeli Reform rabbi (1932-2011)

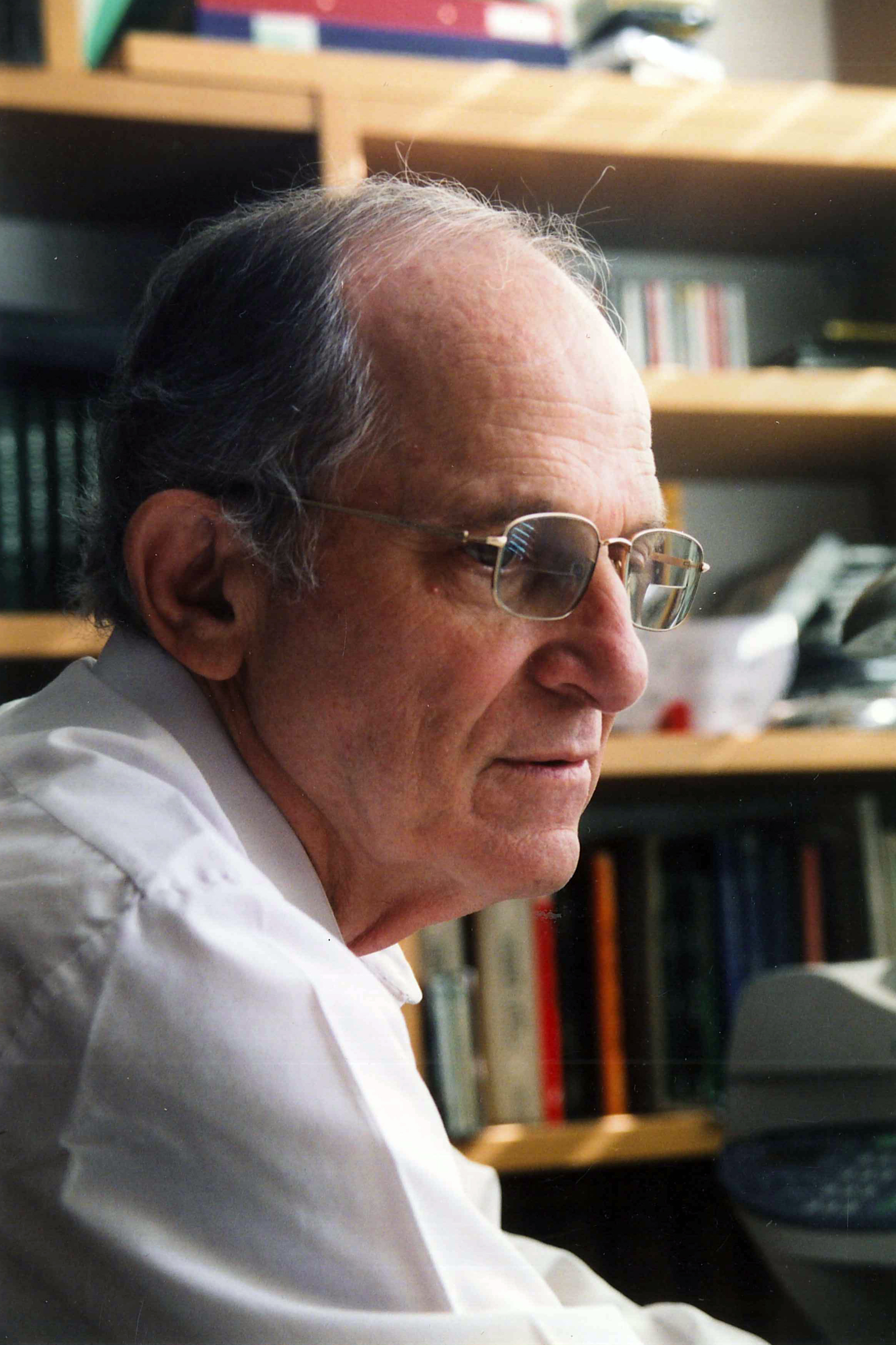
Moshe Zemer

Moshe Zemer (Hebrew: משה זמר; born Melvin Ray Zager, January 1, 1932 – November 3, 2011) was a Reform Rabbi in Israel between 1963-2011. He was the co-founder of Jewish Reform institutions in Israel and served in key positions in them, including as chair of MARAM (The Council of Progressive Rabbis), board member of the Israel Movement for Progressive Judaism, board member of the Union for Progressive Rabbis in the United States, and a senior lecturer of Jewish Studies at the Hebrew Union College in Jerusalem.

== Biography ==
Zemer was born in Kansas City, Missouri, on January 1, 1932. Zemer grew up in Cleveland, Ohio. When he was eight years old, his mother died, and his father placed him for adoption with his brother and sister-in-law, Shmuel and Sarah (Riklin) Zeger in Omaha, Nebraska, where he grew up and was educated. In 1945, he moved with his family to Los Angeles, California, where his family joined Temple Beth Shalom, and where Zemer began religious studies. In 1953, Zemer received his BA in Psychology from UCLA. In 1960, he was ordained as a Rabbi at the Hebrew Union College (HUC) – Jewish Institute of Religion in Cincinnati, Ohio, where he also received a doctorate in Jewish Studies. Following his ordination, he studied at the Hebrew University of Jerusalem in 1960 and 1961. Following his studies, Zemer became Rabbi of Temple Emanuel of Baltimore, in Baltimore, Maryland, where he served as Rabbi until 1963.

In 1963 Zemer made Aliyah and became the Rabbi of Congregation "Kehilat Ha'Sharon" in Kfar Shmaryahu. In 1964 Zemer established Congregation "Emet Ve'Anava" in Ramat Gan, and in 1968 he established Congregation Kedem in Tel Aviv, which he headed for the following twenty years. Zemer also served on the Israel Movement for Progressive Judaism Board, on the Board of CCCR (Central Conference of American Rabbis), and MARAM - (the Council of Progressive Rabbis in Israel). He also served as a senior lecturer of Halachic studies at the HUC in Jerusalem. In 1993 Zemer wrote the book "Sane Judaism," in which he laid out his vision of progressive Jewish law (Halachah), which gives current answers to the needs of individuals and society in modern times. In 2004 Zemer was awarded an honorary doctorate degree from the Hebrew Union College (HUC) in Jerusalem.

The Moshe Zemer award was established by MARAM, and is awarded to a rabbi or rabbinical student who has researched and developed questions and answers on a current event in Israel.

Zemer died on November 3, 2011, and was buried in Kibbutz Kiryat Anavim.

== Bibliography ==
- Walter Jacob and Moshe Zemer. The environment in Jewish law : essays and responsa. Studies in progressive halakhah. New York: Berghahn Books, 2003. ISBN 1-57181-431-0.
- Re-examining progressive Halakhah. Studies in progressive halakhah. New York: Berghahn Books, 2002. ISBN 1-57181-404-3.
- Gender issues in Jewish law : essays and responsa. Studies in progressive halakhah. New York: Berghahn Books, 2001. ISBN 1-57181-239-3.
- Crime and punishment in Jewish law : essays and responsa. Studies in progressive halakhah. [v. 6], New York: Berghahn Books, 1999. ISBN 1-57181-197-4.
- Walter Jacob, Moshe Zemer and Freehof Institute of Progressive Halakhah. Marriage and its obstacles in Jewish law : essays and responsa. Studies in progressive halakhah. 8, Pittsburgh; Tel Aviv; Pittsburgh: Freehof Institute of Progressive Halakhah; Rodef Shalom Press, 1999. ISBN 978-0-929699-10-3.
- Aging and the aged in Jewish law : essays and responsa. Studies in progressive halakhah. 7, Pittsburgh: Freehof Institute of Progressive Halakhah; Rodef Shalom Press, 1998. ISBN 0-929699-08-4.
- Israel and the Diaspora in Jewish law : essays and responsa. Studies in progressive halakhah. 6, Pittsburgh: Freehof Institute of Progressive Halakhah, Rodef Shalom Press, 1997. ISBN 0-929699-09-2.
- Death and euthanasia in Jewish law : essays and responsa. Studies in progressive halakhah v. 4. Pittsburgh: Freehof Institute of Progressive Halakhah : Rodef Shalom Press, 1995. ISBN 0-929699-06-8 (pbk.).
- The fetus and fertility : essays and responsa. Studies in progressive halakhah. 5, Pittsburgh: Freehof Institute of Progressive Halakhah : Rodef Shalom Press, 1995. ISBN 0-929699-07-6.
- Conversion to Judaism in Jewish law : essays and responsa. Studies in progressive halakhah. 3, Tel Aviv; Pittsburgh: Freehof Institute of Progressive Halakhah; Rodef Shalom Press, 1994. ISBN 0-929699-05-X.
- Progressive halakhah : essence and application. Studies in progressive halakhah. 1, Tel Aviv; Pittsburgh: Freehof Institute of Progressive Halakhah; Rodef Shalom Press, 1991. ISBN 0-929699-03-3.
- Walter Jacob, Moshe Zemer, Freehof Institute of Progressive Halakhah and Central Conference of American Rabbis. Rabbinic-lay relations in Jewish law. Studies in progressive halakhah. 2, Tel Aviv; Pittsburgh: Freehof Institute of Progressive Halakhah; Rodef Shalom Press, 1993. ISBN 0-929699-04-1.
- Moshe Zemer. Evolving halakhah : a progressive approach to traditional Jewish law. Woodstock, Vt.: Jewish Lights Pub., 1999. ISBN 1-58023-002-4.

Review by Peter Haas in Shofar.

- Jüdisches Religionsgesetz heute : progressive Halacha. Neukirchen-Vluyn: Neukirchener, 1999. ISBN 3-7887-1737-8.
- Moshe Zemer and Haim Hermann Cohn. Halakhah shefuyah. Tel Aviv: Devir, 1993.
