= Organ transplant law (Israel) =

Organ Transplantation Law, 5768-2008

17th Knesset
- Long title: An Act to regulate the removal, allocation, and transplantation of organs from living and deceased individuals, prohibit organ trafficking, and prevent exploitation of donors and recipients
- Territorial extent: Whole of Israel
- Enacted by: 17th Knesset
- Commenced: 1 May 2008
- Introduced by: Labor, Welfare and Health Committee
- Status: In force

The Organ Transplantation Law, 5768-2008 was passed by the 17th Knesset on March 24, 2008. The law prohibits organ trafficking and the import and export of organs from Israel for the purpose of transplantation.

== History of the law ==
The Organ transplantation law regulates the removal of organs from living and deceased individuals for transplantation into another person's body and establishes a prohibition on organ trafficking. The law was enacted due to a shortage of organs, which led to the development of organ trafficking, exploiting the economic distress of donors and the medical needs of recipients. To combat organ trafficking and address the shortage of organs for transplantation, the law was proposed to regulate the removal, allocation, and transplantation of organs through primary legislation. This ensures oversight and control over the processes of organ removal and allocation, as well as a fair and efficient distribution of organs from deceased individuals for transplantation. The law also includes provisions to prevent the exploitation of donors and recipients and establishes criminal penalties for organ trafficking and brokerage.

The bill was first submitted in November 2003 and passed its first reading in the Knesset in December of that year. Due to the dissolution of the Knesset, the legislation was delayed. The law was ultimately passed on March 24, 2008, and came into effect on May 1, 2008. The committee responsible for preparing the bill was the Labor, Welfare, and Health Committee.

Prior to the law's enactment, Israel experienced significant medical and technological advancements, but there was a persistent shortage of organ donors compared to other countries with similar legislation. For example, in Spain, the default is presumed consent for organ donation upon death unless an individual explicitly objects during their lifetime (from age 18 and if the individual is healthy). Additionally, consultation with the deceased's family is required to verify whether they expressed any objection to organ donation during their lifetime.

== Main provisions ==
The purpose of the law is to encourage individuals to sign an Adi card (a national organ donor card in Israel), thereby consenting to organ donation after death. The law stipulates that signing an Adi card indicates an individual's wish to donate their organs after death to save the lives of patients awaiting transplants. However, to confirm the deceased's intentions, the law mandates consultation with the deceased's family to determine whether they expressed any objection to organ donation during their lifetime. The law also grants individuals who donate organs the status of a chronic illness patient, entitling them to financial benefits, exemptions from certain payments, compensation, and a certificate of appreciation from the state. Violators of the law may face fines or imprisonment for up to three years.

== Impact of the law ==
Since the law's enactment, there has been an increase in organ donations from both living and deceased donors. The legal framework in Israel is similar to that in Spain, England, and New Zealand, where organ trafficking is strictly prohibited, with comparable penalties (fines and imprisonment). However, a "black market" for organ trafficking (from both living and deceased donors) persists in all four countries, with organs often sourced from third-world countries, primarily in Africa.

== See also ==
- Organ transplantation in Israel
