= Schlesinger Institute =

Israeli medical research institute

Coordinates: 31°46′23″N 35°11′06″E

The Schlesinger Institute for Medical-Halakhic Research is an Israeli research institute that focuses on medical ethics within the framework of Jewish law (halakha). Established in 1966 with the support of the Shaare Zedek Medical Center in Jerusalem, the institute researches ethical questions in medicine from a halakhic perspective. It is named in honor of Dr. Falk Schlesinger, the hospital's second director general.

The institute also offers educational programs in Jewish medical ethics for medical students, religious scholars, healthcare professionals, and students. These include a semester-long course at Hadassah Medical Center, international seminars, and workshops for Israeli high school and yeshiva students.

== Publications ==
The Schlesinger Institute publishes books and journals on Jewish medical ethics.

=== Journals ===
The Schlesinger Institute has published two journals: ASSIA in Hebrew (which ceased publication in 2016) and Jewish Medical Ethics (JME) in English.

The journals focus on topics in medical ethics examined from Jewish legal (halakhic) and medical perspectives. Subjects discussed in the published articles include bioethical issues such as end-of-life care, organ transplantation, determination of death, medical decision-making, and other related ethical questions.

=== Encyclopedia of Jewish Medical Ethics ===
The Encyclopedia of Jewish Medical Ethics, written by Avraham Steinberg, M.D., covers topics in medical practice from the perspective of halakha and Jewish thought, drawing on sources from scripture through ancient, medieval, and modern rabbinic literature. It includes surveys of related medical, scientific, philosophical, ethical, and legal material, with references.

Articles address topics relevant to both medical professionals and patients, combining halakhic principles and medical knowledge with references to scripture, the Talmud, and contemporary sources.

Topics include: paternity, suicide, autonomy, hospitals, genetics, religion and science, consent, abortion, IVF, organ transplantation, conflict of halakha and science, old age, embalming, malpractice, pain, Kashrut and Shabbat, birth, medical education, human sexuality, limited resources, medical experimentation on humans, surgery, confidentiality, fertility, lifesaving, animal cruelty, triage, defining death, physicians, and ethics (general and Jewish).

=== Nishmat Abraham ===
Nishmat Abraham on Medical Halakha, written by A.S. Abraham, M.D., F.R.C.P., contains new responsa and medical halakhic rulings published as a four-volume set. It is a commentary on the four sections of the Shulchan Aruch with detailed references from the Talmud through Rishonim and Acharonim. Rulings from halakhic literature are included, with material from contemporary authorities such as Rav M. Feinstein, Rav Sh.Z. Auerbach, Rav Waldenberg, Rav Eliashiv, Rav Ovadia Yosef, Rav Wosner, and Rav Neuwirth. The views of leading authorities are summarized on each point, covering issues in medical halakha.

Topics covered include doctor visits on weekdays and Shabbat, Yom Kippur, and Pesach. Additional topics include hospital or home visits, hospice, end-of-life care or brain death, pregnancy and assisted reproduction, contraception and abortion, Brit Milah (circumcision), and medical issues of niddah (women with a status of ritual uncleanliness related to menstruation). The work also addresses medical malpractice, claims, genetic engineering, cloning, DNA, stem cells, AIDS, herpes, threatened doctors, psychiatric patients, Hatzalah, and preventive medicine, through the lens of their halakhic implications.

=== Additional books ===
The institute has published other books, including:

- Halakhot for the Physician and Patient on the Sabbath and Festivals (English and Hebrew)
- Collections of essays and proceedings from the International Colloquiums on Medicine, Ethics, and Jewish Law (English and Hebrew)
- The Comprehensive Guide to Medical Halakha (English)
- New Horizons in Jewish Medical Ethics (English)
- Establishing the moment of death (Hebrew)
- Practical Aspects of Medicine and Halakha (Hebrew)

== International Responsa Project (IRP) ==
The Institute operates the International Responsa Project (IRP), through which medical-halakhic questions are posed to professionals by various means. Questions regarding medical procedures, ranging from general inquiries to technical ones, are answered by rabbi-doctors at the institute or by a recognized rabbinical authority.

== The Chaim Kahn Library and Information Center ==
The Library and Information Center serves as a resource center for Jewish medical ethics in Israel. It houses compendia of halakha, medical and Jewish journals, and Jewish literature and legal texts.

Computer facilities, a database of Jewish sources, and the library's bibliography are available to the public. The information center is named after Mr. Chaim Kahn, the first chairman of the Institute.

== International conferences ==
International conferences organized by the Schlesinger Institute are attended by rabbis, physicians, and other participants for lectures on contemporary medical halakhic issues. Conference proceedings and background materials have been published in both English and Hebrew.

== See also ==
- Medical ethics
- Jewish medical ethics
- Halakha
- Responsa
- Jewish medicine
