= Organ transplantation in Israel =

Legality and prevalence of the medical procedure in Israel

Organ transplantation in Israel has historically been low compared to other Western countries due to a common belief that organ donation is prohibited under Jewish law. This changed with the passage of new organ donation laws in 2008. If two patients have the same medical need, priority will now go to the patient who has signed an organ donor card, or whose family members have donated an organ (though medical necessity still takes precedence). This policy was nicknamed don't give, don't get. The law also defines "brain death" as an indication of death for all legal purposes, including organ donation. Additionally the law provides financial reimbursement to living donors for medical expenses due to donation and lost time at work. Organ trafficking is explicitly banned. Health insurance plans can no longer reimburse patients who go abroad to receive transplants.

Currently, although the rate of organ donation is still relatively low, it is rising.

== Legal status ==
Until 2008, there was no law prohibiting organ trafficking in Israel. In 2008, the Knesset approved two laws designed to regulate organ donations. The first law defines brain-respiratory death as a situation in which person who has no blood pressure, fails to breathe without external life support systems and has no response from the pupils or any other reflexes is declared dead by two certified doctors.

The second law provides for various benefits to living organ donors, such as reimbursement for medical expenses and lost work up to 18,000 NIS (roughly US$5,000), priority on the transplant list should they require a future organ donation, waived self-participation fee for any medical service resulting from the donation, and the attainment of a "chronic patient" status, which entitles the holder to additional medical benefits. In addition, the law criminalizes organ trafficking, receiving compensation for organs, or acting as an organ broker. This law was cited as a model by proposed 2009 legislation in the US.

== Organizations ==
Israel operates a National Transplant and Organ Donation Center, established in 1993 as an institute of the Ministry of Health. The center incorporates the ADI organization, founded by private citizens, which maintains a database of donors and sponsors donor cards. As of 2009, the database contains around 500,000 names of donors, about 10% of Israel's adult population.

Since some ultra-religious Jews feel the 2008 law does not properly address halachic questions, Israel's Chief Rabbinate has decided to issue an organ donor card of its own, which allows organ harvesting from the potential donor only if brain death is determined according to the strictest letter of the law - for example by requiring that brain death be confirmed using electronic equipment rather than just the determination of a physician.

The Halachic Organ Donor Society is active in Israel trying to raise awareness about Halachic acceptance of brain-stem death and support of organ donation. Most Israelis are secular but when it comes to death, most turn to Orthodox rabbis to seek guidance. That is why Israel has one of the lowest organ donor rates in the Western world. The Halachic Organ Donor Society has succeeded in recruiting more than 230 rabbis to register for organ donor cards. It has given presentations to over 30,000 Jews around the world to encourage them to donate organs to the general public. This public awareness campaign has increased the number of Israelis who have signed organ donor cards.

== Prevalence of donations ==
Both Orthodox Jews and the majority secular Jewish population often cite Jewish law as the reason for not donating. The rate of agreement to organ donation is only 45%, which is 50% lower than the rate in most Western countries. The percentage of people who hold an organ donation card in Israel is only 14 percent; in Western countries the rate is 30-40%. As a result, there are about 1,000 Israelis currently on the "waiting list" for organs, and it is estimated that roughly 10% of them die annually, due to a lack of donations.

Yaakov Levi, the director of the Heart Transplant Unit at Sheba Medical Center has called for organs to be allocated first to those who are willing to donate their own organs and have possessed a donor card for several years. This call was accepted and incorporated into the 2008 law. According to the New York Times, "Organ donation rates in Israel are among the lowest in the developed world, about one-third the rate in Western Europe, in large part because of what Health Ministry officials and doctors describe as a widespread impression that Jewish law prohibits transplants as a 'desecration of the body......'"

== Organ trafficking ==
According to organ trade expert Nancy Scheper-Hughes of Organ Watch (in 2001), Israel had become a "pariah" in the organ transplant world. The lack of donations due to Jewish custom heightened the disparity between the supply and demand of organs. This led to the popularity of "transplant tourism" in which patients in need of organs travel to medical centres abroad to receive organs. Prior to the 2008 law prohibiting it, some Israeli organ brokers advertised on the radio and in newspapers. Kidneys, which are the most traded organ, may fetch up to $150,000 for brokers who usually pay the donors far less. The Jewish weekly newspaper The Forward reported in the wake of this scandal that an Organ Trafficking Prohibition Act of 2009, sponsored by Democratic Senator Arlen Specter of Pennsylvania, has yet to be officially introduced in the U.S., but that its proposed language cites Israel as a model of a country that has enacted a law providing benefits for organ donors.

The lack of regulations against organ trafficking prior to 2008 made Israel a focal point for the international organ trade. Health insurance would reimburse Israelis for organ transplants done abroad, but this has been banned in the new law.

As a result of all the abuses of the illegal market in human organs, there is a growing movement of activists in Israel and in America to legalize a Government-regulated program to offer financial incentives to people for living kidney donations and to families for deceased donations from brain-stem dead donors. This movement is headed, among other organizations, by the Alliance for Organ Donor Incentives.

== The Aftonbladet reveal ==
In August 2009 the Swedish tabloid Aftonbladet published an article revealing that in 1992 the Israeli Defense Force took organs from Palestinians who died in Israeli custody. The allegations were denied by Israel, and the article caused a diplomatic row between Israel and Sweden. However the author of the article, Donald Boström, spoke to Israel Radio on 19 August 2009 and said he was worried by the allegations he reported: "It concerns me, to the extent that I want it to be investigated, that's true. But whether it's true or not — I have no idea, I have no clue."

In December an interview was broadcast on Israeli television during which Israel's chief pathologist, Dr. Yehuda Hiss, discussed the harvesting of organs in the 1990s at the Abu Kabir Forensic Institute. The interview was followed by a confirmation from Israeli officials that organs were taken in the 1990s without the permission of families of the deceased. Officials denied that the practice continued, and noted that both Israeli and Palestinian organs were taken without permission. "We started to harvest corneas for various hospitals in Israel," Hiss said in an interview on Israel's Channel 2 network. "Whatever was done was highly informal. No permission was asked from the families," he said.

== See also ==
- Israeli–Arab organ donations
