= Avraham Steinberg =

Israeli pediatric neurologist, rabbi and medical ethicist

Avraham Steinberg (Hebrew: אברהם שטינברג; born 25 August 1947) is an Israeli medical ethicist, pediatric neurologist, rabbi and editor of Talmudic literature.

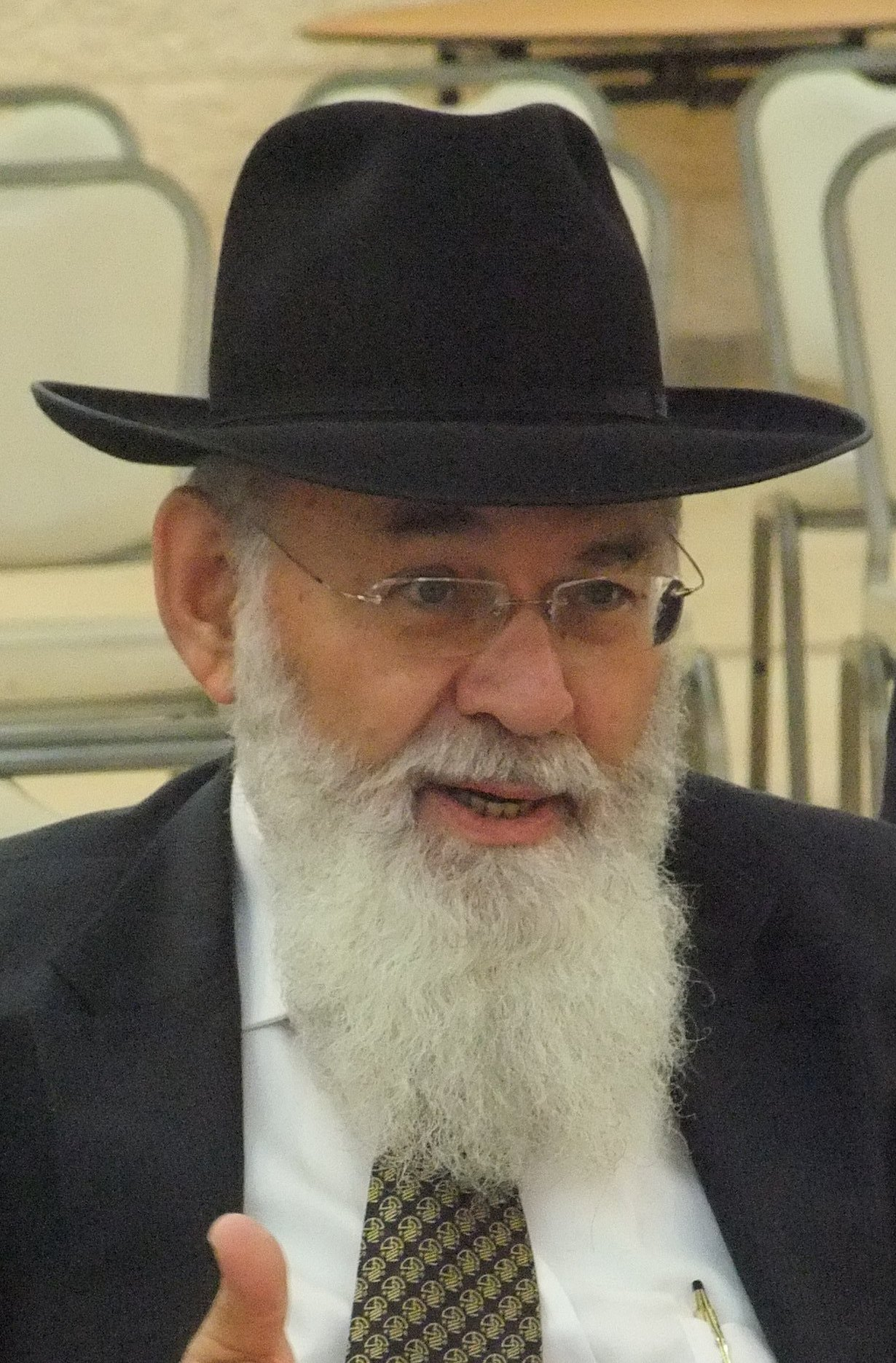
Avraham Steinberg

Steinberg is Director of the Medical Ethics Unit at Shaare Zedek Medical Center, Jerusalem, and co-chairman of the Israeli National Council on Bioethics. In 1999 he won the Israel Prize for original Rabbinic literature for his 7-volume Encyclopedia Hilchatit Refuit in Hebrew - the most comprehensive text book ever compiled on this subject. It was translated into English by Fred Rosner as the Encyclopedia of Jewish Medical Ethics.

Steinberg is Director of the Torah literature publishing group Yad HaRav Herzog, head of the Editorial Board of the Talmudic Encyclopedia (or Encyclopedia Talmudit) and Editor-in-Chief of the Talmudic Micropedia. He professes to see "very good things" in different Orthodox groups and declines to identify with a particular one.

== Early life ==
Steinberg was born in 1947 in the Displaced Persons Camp in Hof an der Saale, Germany, to Gittel Gleicher and Rabbi Moshe HaLevi Steinberg, formerly Rabbi of Przemyślany, Galicia. He immigrated with his parents as an infant to Israel in 1949. His father served as the rabbi of Kiryat Yam, and he spent a lot of time teaching his son Torah. After graduating high school, Steinberg studied at the rabbinic academy Yeshivat Mercaz Harav in Jerusalem.

Steinberg studied medicine at the Medical School of the Hebrew University-Hadassah Hospital in Jerusalem. He trained in pediatrics at the Shaare Zedek Medical Center in Jerusalem, and in pediatric neurology at the Albert Einstein College of Medicine and the Montefiore Hospital Medical Center, Bronx, New York. He served in the Israeli Air Force as a medical officer, reaching the rank of major.

== Career ==
Steinberg worked as a senior pediatric neurologist at Shaare Zedek and Bikkur Cholim Hospitals in Jerusalem, and he taught medical ethics at the Hebrew University-Hadassah Medical School.

Steinberg was the first director of the Dr. Falk Schlesinger Institute for Medico-Halakhic Research at Shaare Zedek Medical Center in Jerusalem, and the founder and first editor of their quarterly journal "Assia" - A Journal of Jewish Ethics and Halacha, devoted to issues in Jewish medical ethics.

Steinberg established and served as Director of the Medical Ethics Center of the Hebrew University - Hadassah Medical School. He has submitted over 4,000 expert witness opinions in court cases in pediatric neurology and medical ethics. He has lectured at hundreds of national and international conferences, as well as giving numerous public lectures in Israel, the US and around the world.

Steinberg has chaired several national committees on bio-ethical issues, including the National Israeli Committee for Evaluation of Living Organ Donors, the National Advisory Committee to the Minister of Health for Enacting a Law Concerning the Terminally Ill, the National Ethics Committee in Accordance with the Dying Patient Act (2005), the National Advisory Committee for Amendments of the Anatomy and Pathology Law, and the National Forum Concerning Organ Donations in Israel. He has also served as member of various other national and public committees, including the National Committee in Accordance with the Brain Death Act, and he is the co-chairman of the Israeli National Council on Bioethics.

Steinberg has served as an adviser on medical ethics issues to the Knesset and to the Chief Rabbinate of Israel. He also has been involved in halakhic aspects of modern medical issues with the most prominent rabbinic authorities, particularly with Rabbi Sholomo Zalman Auerbach, Rabbi Yosef Sholom Eliashiv, Rabbi Ovadia Yosef and Rabbi Eliezer Y. Waldenberg. Steinberg serves as a member of the halachic committee of Magen David Adom, chairman of the Board of Mohalim of the Israeli Chief Rabbinate and the Ministry of Health, and as a member of the Committee for Medical Matters and the Inter-Religions Dialogue Committee of the Chief Rabbinate of Israel.

== Talmudic Encyclopedia ==
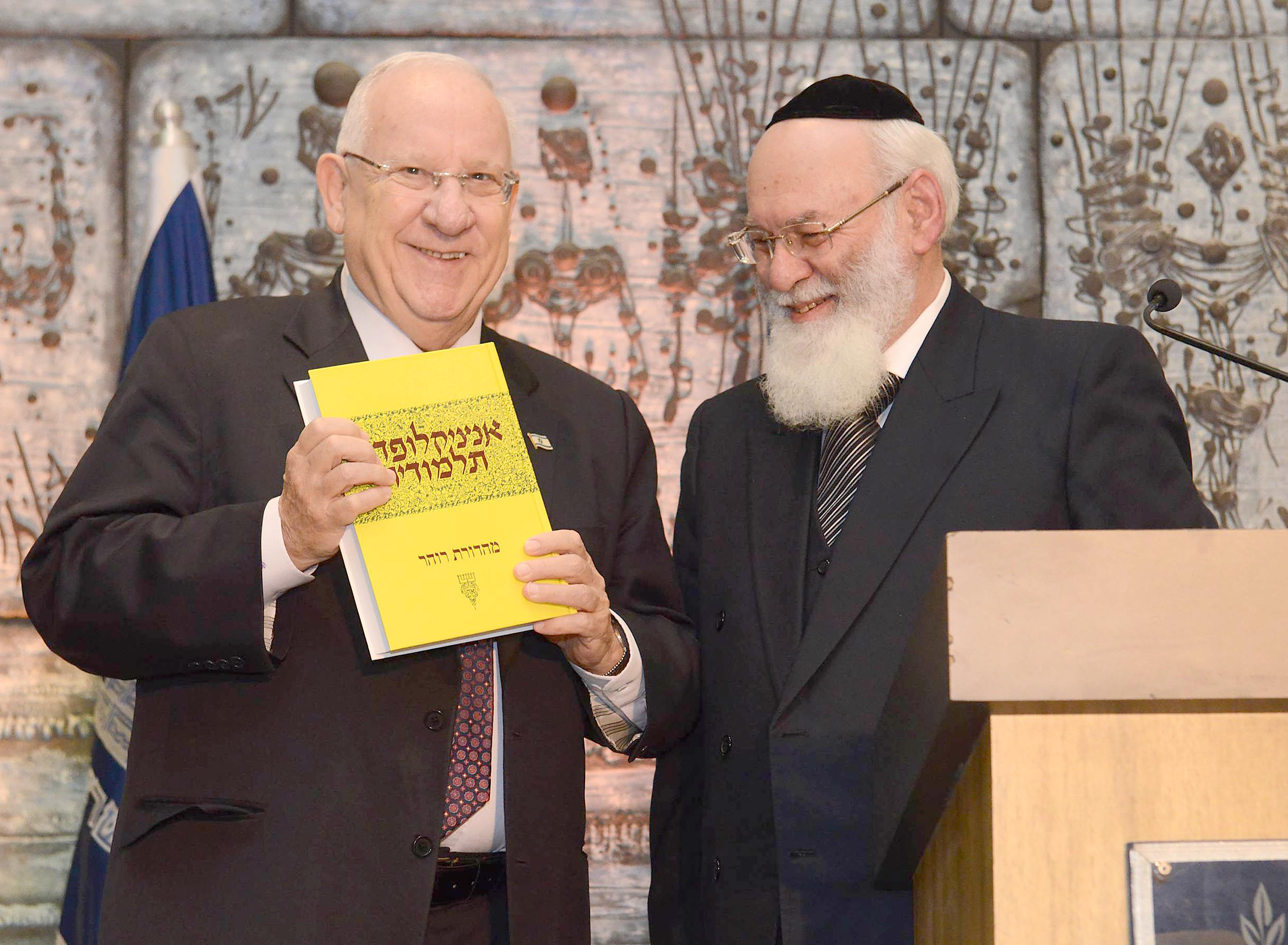
Steinberg gives Pres. Reuven Rivlin a Talmudic Encyclopedia volume, 2016

Since 2006 Steinberg has been the Director of the Yad Harav Herzog Institute and as the head of the editorial board of the Talmudic Encyclopedia. Since 2013 he has edited The Talmudic Micropedia, an abridged and updated version of the Talmudic Encyclopedia.

== Awards received ==
- 1990 Rav Kook Prize from the Tel Aviv–Jaffa Municipality
- 1990 Katz Prize from the Israeli Knesset
- 1999 Israel Prize for Original Rabbinic Literature.
- 2008 Honorary Doctorate from Bar-Ilan University.
- 2023 Katz prize from the Israeli President

== Bibliography: Jewish medical ethics ==
Since 1969, Steinberg has been researching and publishing extensively in the fields of general and Jewish medical ethics, the history of medicine, medicine and law, and pediatric neurology. He has written or edited 42 books and public reports in 65 volumes, 292 papers and chapters in Israeli and international journals and books. There are indices to many of his published (Hebrew) articles in Assia, Da'at, and Techumin.

=== Books ===
- Chapters in the Pathology in the Talmud (1975), 94 pp, The F. Schlesinger Institute for Medico-Halakhic Research, Jerusalem (Hebrew)
- Jewish Law Pertaining to Medicine and Physicians, (1978), 252 pp, Mosad Harav Kook, Jerusalem; 2nd printing (2008), Mosad Harav Kook, Jerusalem (Hebrew)
- Encyclopedia of Jewish Medical Law, Vol I, (1988), 362 pp, The F. Schlesinger Institute for Medico-Halakhic Research, Jerusalem, 1988 (Hebrew)
- Encyclopedia of Jewish Medical Law, Vol II, (1991), 457 pp, The F. Schlesinger Institute for Medico-Halakhic Research, Jerusalem (Hebrew)
- Encyclopedia of Jewish Medical Law, Vol III, (1992), 554 pp, The F. Schlesinger Institute for Medico-Halakhic Research, Jerusalem (Hebrew)
- Encyclopedia of Jewish Medical Law, Vol IV, (1994), 535 pp, The F. Schlesinger Institute for Medico-Halakhic Research, Jerusalem (Hebrew)
- Encyclopedia of Jewish Medical Law, Vol V, (1996), 409 pp, The F. Schlesinger Institute for Medico-Halakhic Research, Jerusalem (Hebrew).
- Medicine and Jewish Law, (1998), 128 pp, Prolog Publishing House (Hebrew).
- Encyclopedia of Jewish Medical Law, Vol VI, (1998), 423 pp, The F. Schlesinger Institute for Medico-Halakhic Research, Jerusalem (Hebrew)
- Encyclopedia of Jewish Medical Ethics, translated into English by Fred Rosner, 3 volumes, (2003), 1265 pp, Feldheim Publishing House, Jerusalem-New York
- Encyclopedia of Jewish Medical Law, 2nd edition, Vol I-VII, (2006), 3400 pp, The F. Schlesinger Institute for Medico-Halakhic Research, Jerusalem (Hebrew)
- Talmudic Micropedia, Editor-in-Chief, Volumes I-V, (2013-2015), Jerusalem (Hebrew)

=== Reports ===
The following are examples of reports written by Professor Steinberg recommending policy on medical ethical issues:

- Steinberg A, et al. (2002), 52 pp, Report of the National Committee Concerning the Dying Patient – Act Proposal: The Dying Patient, The Ministry of Health, Jerusalem (Hebrew).
- Steinberg A, et al. (2003), 49 pp, Report of the National Committee Concerning Amendments to the Act of Anatomy and Pathology, The Ministry of Health, Jerusalem (Hebrew).
- Steinberg A, et al., (2004), 44 pp, Report of the Public Forum for the Advancement of Organ Donations in Israel, National Center for Transplantation, The Ministry of Health, Jerusalem (Hebrew)
