= Shinuy =

Unconventional method of justifiably performing a forbidden act in Jewish law

In Halakha, a shinuy (Hebrew: שינוי, with variant English spellings) is an unconventional method of performing an act that is normally forbidden when there may be justification for performing such an act, for example, when there is a medical need. A shinuy is generally performed when there is not complete danger to life, but a lesser danger, such as to limb.

A shinuy transforms an act from one that is biblically forbidden to one that is rabbinically prohibited, thereby making it less of an offense. This can be done by performing the act in a manner that makes it more difficult or less practical.

Examples of a shinuy could be knocking a phone off the hook with one's elbow or pressing the buttons with one's knuckles.

== See also ==
- Pikuach nefesh
- Grama
