= Eliezer Waldenberg =

Israeli rabbi (1915–2006)

Eliezer Waldenberg אליעזר וולדנברג

Personal life
- Born: Eliezer Yehuda Valdenberg; December 10, 1915 Jerusalem, Ottoman Empire
- Died: November 21, 2006 (aged 90) Jerusalem, Israel
- Buried: Har HaMenuchot, Jerusalem, Israel; November 21, 2006
- Spouse: Soshana Reizel Hendel (Verner) Waldenberg
- Children: Simcha Bunim Waldenberg
- Parents: Yaakov Gedalya Valdenberg (father); Rachel Leah Waldenberg (mother)

Religious life
- Religion: Judaism
- Main work: Tzitz Eliezer

Eliezer Yehuda Waldenberg (Hebrew: הרב אליעזר יהודה וולדנברג; December 10, 1915 – November 21, 2006) was a rabbi, posek, and dayan in Jerusalem. He is known as a leading authority on medicine and Jewish law and referred to as the Tzitz Eliezer after his 21-volume halachic treatise covering a wide breadth of halacha, including Jewish medical ethics, and daily ritual issues from Shabbat to kashrut.

== Biography ==
Waldenberg was born in Jerusalem in 1915 to Rabbi Yaakov Gedalya who immigrated from Kovno, Lithuania to Jerusalem, then in the Ottoman Empire, in the early 1900s. He studied in the Etz Chaim Yeshiva and was a student of the rosh yeshiva, Rav Isser Zalman Meltzer. Waldenberg wrote his first book, Dvar Eliezer, at age 19 in 1934.

For many years, Waldenberg served as a community rabbi at a small synagogue on Jaffa Road adjacent to the Shaare Tzedek Hospital. Many doctors prayed at the synagogue and brought their questions to the rabbi. Waldenberg began to answer their questions about Jewish law and its application to medical ethics, and would come to teach a weekly medical ethics class to the hospital's doctors and nurses. He was close to Rabbi Ben Zion Meir Hai Uziel, and was the head of the Shaarei Zion Yeshiva, founded by him.

In 1957, Waldenberg became president of the District Rabbinical Court in Jerusalem. He was later appointed to the Beit Din Hagadol in Jerusalem where he sat with Rav Yosef Shalom Elyashiv.

In 1976, Waldenberg was awarded the Israel Prize for Rabbinical studies.

Waldenberg died on November 21, 2006, at Shaarei Zedek Medical Center in Jerusalem and was buried later the same day at Jerusalem's Har HaMenuchot cemetery.

== Medical opinions ==
His major work Tzitz Eliezer is an encyclopedic treatise on halachic questions, viewed as one of the great achievements of halachic scholarship of the 20th century. Though he wrote numerous books and articles in all fields of halacha, he was best known for his decisions on medical dilemmas. He addresses in his volumes complex medical questions including fertility, abortion, organ transplantation, euthanasia, sex reassignment surgery, autopsies, smoking, cosmetic surgery, and medical experimentation. His halachic opinions are valued by rabbis across the religious spectrum.

Waldenberg forbade performing elective surgery on someone who is neither sick nor in pain, such as cosmetic surgery. He argues that such activities are outside the boundaries of the physician's mandate to heal. Notably, Rabbi Moshe Feinstein disagreed with this opinion.

He allowed first trimester abortion of a fetus which would be born with a deformity that would cause it to suffer, and termination of a fetus with a lethal fetal defect such as Tay–Sachs disease up to the end of the second trimester of gestation.

He ruled that a child conceived outside the womb, through in vitro fertilization, has no parents and bears no halachic relationship either to the biological parents or the "surrogate mother", the woman who carries the child to term.

He was one of a small but growing number of rabbis to forbid smoking.

Many of his medical opinions were recorded by his student Avraham Steinberg, and then translated into summary volumes.

In the chapter entitled "On the treatment which exposes the physician to danger", Waldenberg wrote:

In principle, a person may not place himself in possibly life-threatening danger in order to save his neighbor's life... It is permitted for a physician to assume the risk of treating patients with any type of contagious disease. Indeed, he is credited with the fulfillment of an important religious duty. When preparing to treat a patient with a contagious disease, the physician should pray to G-d for special guidance and protection since he is endangering his own life. A military physician is permitted to render medical care to a wounded soldier in a combat zone although he is endangering his own life. This applies even if it is doubtful whether the wounded soldier will live, die, or be killed. Similarly, another soldier is allowed to place his own life in danger in order to rescue a wounded comrade from the combat zone.

Waldenberg ruled sex reassignment surgery to be permissible in the case of a baby born androgynous where one set of organs were more developed. After careful halachic and medical consideration, Waldenberg ruled that a transsexual woman following sex reassignment surgery (SRS) is a halachic woman. He wrote, "The external anatomy which is visible is what determines the halakha" in the present tense. Nonetheless, he affirmed the universal position in Orthodox Judaism that voluntary SRS is prohibited by Halacha.

== Kevod habriyot ==
Waldenberg permitted hearing Torah reading, Shofar blowing and Megillah reading by means of a loudspeaker, telephone, or radio, if no other options were available. (Responsa Tzitz Eliezer, 8:11.). However Rabbi Shlomo Zalman Auerbach strongly disagreed on this. (see Minchas Shlomo I:9). Waldenberg held that voices replicated by electronic devices generally have the status of noise from musical instruments, rather than that of actual voices.

He also emphasized the Jewish concept of Kevod HaBriyot (human honor or dignity) in his rulings. As an example, Waldenberg adduced this concept in support of his ruling that a deaf person can use an electric hearing aid on Shabbat. Waldenberg wrote:

We see from the foregoing that the prohibition on carrying an object that is muktzeh is waived for the sake of kevod ha-beriyot, so that a person will not in any way be demeaned in his own eyes or the eyes of others on account of being unable to carry [the object]. And if that is the case, it appears that there is no concern about kevod ha-beriyot greater than the one that arises in connection with ensuring that a deaf person does not suffer embarrassment because of being unable to hear what people say to him. It is difficult to imagine the magnitude of the embarrassment and unpleasantness caused him when he comes among people, in the synagogue, and he is isolated, unable to hear what is going on, unable to respond to those who ask him a question. This produces a concern about kevod ha-beriyot greater than in connection with the matters discussed earlier, to which must be added his distress at forgoing public worship and being unable to hear the Torah reading and the responses to Kaddish and Kedusha, etc. This negates the performance of a batch of mitzvot, of lesser and greater importance, and therefore it is preferable to permit the carrying of muktzeh for so great a matter of kevod ha-beriyot and to permit the deaf person to carry his hearing aid on Shabbat.

== Jewish law, the State of Israel and the Israel Defense Forces ==
Waldenberg also wrote a multivolume set on the practical issues of government called Hilkhot Medinah. In this work he takes issue with many positions of former chief rabbis Yitzhak HaLevi Herzog, Shlomo Goren, and Isser Yehuda Unterman.

He writes in support of yeshiva students' exemption from compulsory military service in the Israel Defense Forces, considering that through the merit of their Torah learning they help protect the country.

He granted workers the right to strike when employers have violated a workplace condition that has become "the custom of the land." Most legal authorities required workers to bring their employer to a beit din (religious court) before resorting to a strike. "In situations such as these, in which the worker is absolutely certain that the employer has transgressed and violated a condition that has been established as the custom of the land, the worker may take the law into his own hands by levying the fine that the appointed communal leaders have deemed appropriate for a situation such as this."

Even though "a convert may not hold a position of Jewish communal authority", Waldenberg ruled that a convert may serve on a communal committee, but not in a lone communal position.

== Works ==
- שאלות ותשובות ציץ אליעזר [She'elot U'Teshuvot Tzitz Eliezer] (in Hebrew). Jerusalem.
- הלכות מדינה [Hilchos Medinah] (in Hebrew) on legal issues of the political state in three-volumes
- Divrei Eliezer, novella
- Shvisas Hayam on ships, maritime law, and Shabbos
