= Daniel Sinclair =

Daniel Sinclair (Hebrew: דניאל סינקלייר) is a British-born Israeli Law Professor and scholar of Jewish law (Halachah), specialising in contemporary Jewish medical ethics.

An Orthodox rabbi, Professor Sinclair served as the rabbi of the Edinburgh Hebrew Congregation in the 1980s. He subsequently became Principal of Jews' College, London before returning to Israel to pursue an academic career. He is a professor at the law school of the College of Management Academic Studies in Rishon Lezion, and an associate professor at Fordham University. He also has taught at the Spertus Institute in Chicago.

His books include Tradition and the biological revolution (1989) and Jewish biomedical law: Legal and extra-legal dimensions (2003). Sinclair also has authored a number of articles on Jewish ethics and written about Israeli applications of Jewish law (Mishpat Ivri). Among other topics, he has written on Jewish approaches to abortion, artificial insemination, the definition of death, euthanasia, patient autonomy and the relation between law and morality.

He holds an LLB (Hons) (University of London), LLM (Monash University), LLD (Hebrew University) and Rabbinical Ordination.
