= Halachic Organ Donor Society =

Nonprofit organization

The Halachic Organ Donor Society, also known as the HOD Society, was started in December 2001. Its mission is to save lives by increasing organ donation from Jews to the general public (including gentiles).

The organization recognizes the legitimate debate in Orthodox Jewish law surrounding brain stem death and offers a unique organ donor card that allows people to choose between donating organs at brain stem death or alternatively at cessation of heart beat (asystole). It currently has thousands of members, including more than 350 Orthodox Rabbis and several Chief Rabbis. It has delivered educational lectures that have encouraged more than 34,000 Jews to donate organs.
