= Solomon Freehof =

American Reform rabbi, posek, and scholar

Solomon Bennett Freehof (August 8, 1892 – June 12, 1990) was a prominent Reform rabbi, posek, and scholar. He served as president of the Central Conference of American Rabbis and the World Union for Progressive Judaism. Beginning in 1955, he led the CCAR's work on Jewish law through its responsa committee. He also spearheaded changes to Reform liturgy with revisions to the Union Prayer Book (siddur). For many years, he served as the pulpit rabbi at Rodef Shalom in Pittsburgh.

== Personal life ==
Freehof was born in London, moved to the U.S. in 1903, received a degree from the University of Cincinnati (1914) and ordained from Hebrew Union College (1915). He was a World War I army chaplain, a liturgy professor at HUC, and a rabbi at Chicago's Congregation Kehillath Anshe Maarav before moving to Pittsburgh. He retired in 1966. He is descended from the Alter Rebbe, the founder of Lubavitcher Hasidism.

He studied halakhah with various Orthodox rabbis, including Wolf Leiter of Pittsburgh and Leopold Greenwald.

Lillian (née Simon) Freehof, his wife, wrote plays, novels and children's books. They married in 1934. The couple had no children.

Freehof was followed at Rodef Shalom, and in work on Reform responsa, by his protégé, Walter Jacob, who later established the Freehof Institute of Progressive Halakhah.

In 1963, the Central Conference of American Rabbis issued a responsa written by Freehof titled "Miscegenation and Conversion of Negroes", stating that there was no prohibition in Reform Judaism against interracial marriage, citing the marriage of Moses to Zipporah, an Ethiopian woman. The responsa describes the conversion of African Americans to Judaism as a "troublesome situation", because a "Negro becoming a Jew subjects himself to double difficulties." Freehof wrote that he would discourage an African-American man who wanted to marry a Jewish woman "For the sake of their happiness", but would not refuse.

== Sources ==
- Cohn-Sherbok, Dan “Law in Reform Judaism : a study of Solomon Freehof” in Jewish Law Annual
- Encyclopaedia Judaica, Vol.7 p. 121
- Friedman, Rabbi Joan. "'Guidance, Not Governance': Rabbi Solomon Freehof and Reform Responsa", (a 2013 National Jewish Book Award finalist)
- Friedman, Rabbi Joan. "The Making of a Reform Rabbi: Solomon Freehof from Childhood to HUC," American Jewish Archives Journal, 58/1-2 (2006): 1-49.
- ___________. "The writing of 'Reform Jewish Practice and Its Rabbinic Background'" in CCAR Journal 51,
- Friedman, Rabbi Joan. "A Critique of Solomon Freehof's Concept of Minhag and Reform Jewish Practice." In Re-examining Progressive Halakhah, Studies in Progressive Halakhah, ed. Walter Jacob and Moshe Zemer, 111-133. NY: Berghahn Books, 2002.
- Inventory of the Freehof papers, including a biography
- Jacob,Walter et al., Eds. Essays in Honor of Solomon B. Freehof 1964 (A collection of 19 essays about Freehof, including a bibliography.)
- Weiss, Kenneth J. “Freehof’s methodology as a Reform Jewish halachist” in Journal of Reform Judaism 32,

== Selected works ==
- Contemporary Reform Responsa, 1974.
- Current Reform Responsa, 1969.
- Modern Reform Responsa, 1971.
- New Reform Responsa, 1980.
- Reform Responsa, 1960.
- Recent Reform Responsa, 1963.
- Reform Responsa for our Time, 1977.
- The Responsa Literature Hebrew Union College Press, 1955
- Today's Reform Responsa, 1990.
- "The Natural Law in the Jewish Tradition", University of Notre Dame Natural Law Institute Proceedings, v.15, p. 15
- Commentaries on Ezekiel, Isaiah, Jeremiah, Job, Psalms, e.g., Book of Job, A Commentary. UAHC, 1958
- Preaching the Bible: Sermons for Sabbaths and high holy days , 1974
- Reform Jewish practice and its rabbinic background, 1952
- The small sanctuary: Judaism in the prayerbook, 1942
- Stormers of heaven, 1931

== Award ==
- 1976: National Jewish Book Award in the Jewish Thought category for Contemporary Reform Resonsa

== Websites ==
- The Solomon B. Freehof Institute of Progressive Halakhah
