= Pikuach nefesh =

Principle in Jewish law

Pikuach nefesh (Hebrew: פיקוח נפש), which means 'saving a soul' or 'saving a life', is the principle in Halakha (Jewish law) that the preservation of human life overrides virtually any other religious rule of Judaism. In the event that a person is in critical danger, most mitzvot become inapplicable if they would hinder the ability to save oneself or someone else.

A Magen David Adom paramedic operating a motor vehicle on the eve of Yom Kippur—the holiest day in Judaism. Since his actions constitute pikuach nefesh, this otherwise forbidden activity is permissible by Jewish law.

== Origin and interpretation ==
=== Biblical source ===
The Torah, in Leviticus 18:5, states simply: "You shall keep My statutes and My laws, which a person shall do and shall live by them. I am the LORD."

Ezekiel 20:11 states the following: "And I gave them my statutes, and showed them my judgements, which if a man do, he shall even live in them."

=== Talmudic discussion ===
In the Talmud (Yoma 85b), Samuel of Nehardea interpreted the verses above to imply, "Live by them [God's statutes and laws], and do not die by them". Shmuel's interpretation, which is accepted as canonical in Rabbinic Judaism, is that Jews should live by Jewish law as long as doing so does not endanger their lives, but should not die because of it (except in narrow circumstances identified elsewhere). Shmuel implicitly rejects the alternative interpretation, "Live by them, and die by them".

The Talmud discusses a number of cases as examples in which biblically mandated laws can be disregarded for the sake of saving a human life. (B.Yoma 84b) All of these examples relate to Sabbath prohibitions: rescuing a child from the sea, breaking apart a wall that has collapsed on a child, breaking down a door about to close on an infant, and extinguishing a fire to save a life. The phrase pikuach nefesh appears to derive from that context.

The Mishna discusses when one is permitted to break one's fast on Yom Kippur: "If one is seized by a ravenous hunger, he may be given to eat even unclean things until his eyes are lightened." Several other examples are displayed in Yoma, including feeding one medicine and rescuing one from a mudslide.

== Drawing the line ==
The principle of pikuach nefesh has limitations. The individual whose life is to be saved must be a specific, identifiable individual, rather than an abstract or potential beneficiary. Another question is what constitutes a life-threatening situation. Some situations are clearly life-threatening, such as one who is dying of a disease and will die without medical intervention, or one who is drowning and will not be able to escape the water without help from another. In other situations, it may be unclear if a life is truly in danger. For example, if a person is feeling "extreme pain", this may be tremendously uncomfortable, but it is unclear whether it may lead to death. It is always considered preferable to err on the side of caution (i.e., "violating" Jewish laws), even if this later turns out to be unnecessary.

=== Uncertainty ===
If it cannot be ascertained whether or not a situation is life-threatening, the situation must be considered life-threatening until proven otherwise, thereby allowing action to be taken. It is of prime importance that if one believes a life may be in danger, and seconds may count, that persons involved not delay helping the victim out of fear of violating halakha, or in order to determine if such a violation is permissible according to halakha. If one takes action in violation of halakha to save a life when they believe the situation is life-threatening, but later learns that there was no threat to a human life, they have not sinned, and must not feel guilty over having made such a mistake.

=== Who must help ===
In a life-threatening situation, it is necessary, when possible, for the most qualified individuals available to provide all assistance necessary during every moment of the situation. However, when seconds count, there must be no delay in determining who is more qualified.

If there is a choice between two Jews, and there is clearly plenty of time to decide, it is preferable that the more observant Jew break the halakha. That shows the importance of breaking halakha when a life is on the line and that less observant Jews are not permitted to serve the purpose of breaking halakha to avoid having more observant Jews do so.

If there is a choice between a Jew and a gentile who are equally qualified, and the situation is not urgent, it is preferable for the gentile to provide the assistance (with a notable exception of childbirth to provide more comfort).

== Examples ==
=== Organ donation ===
According to some halakhic rulers, organ donation in Jewish law is one classic example of the obligation to violate a commandment because of pikuach nefesh. Saving a life can override the prohibition against desecrating a corpse. However, due to the limitation that a specific life must be in danger, a specific organ recipient must generally be identified before the organ is removed. Organ removal to organ banks for possible future use is generally prohibited by all Orthodox Judaism poskim.

=== Medication ===
Pancreatic enzyme replacement therapy is a pig-derived mixture of pancreatic enzymes, taken as an oral medication by patients with certain pancreatic disorders that cause exocrine pancreatic insufficiency. These include cystic fibrosis, chronic pancreatitis, pancreatic cancer and following surgical removal of the pancreas. Jewish figures such as the Chief Rabbi of the United Hebrew Congregations have ruled it permissible for Jewish patients to take these medications, providing there is no suitable alternative.

=== Shabbat and holidays ===
The laws of Shabbat and the Jewish holidays may be suspended for the purposes of pikuach nefesh. The earliest known example of this took place in 167 BCE, when Mattathias and the Hasmoneans declared that it was permitted for their followers to fight on the Sabbath day to defend themselves from attack. One is allowed to travel in order to save another's life, and medical care may be provided to critically ill patients (see Driving on Shabbat). According to Moshe Feinstein, it is permissible to travel to accompany a woman in labor to a hospital because the Talmud is especially solicitous of health with respect to pregnancy and childbirth. Shabbat laws can also be bent for a woman who has given birth in the last three days to make sure that she is comfortable and healthy.

One is allowed to drive a woman to a hospital on Shabbat to give birth, since birth can be life-threatening without medical supervision. Similarly, one may sign a consent form for surgery on Shabbat if the surgery will otherwise be delayed.

If one's close relative is transported to the hospital under emergency circumstances during Shabbat, one is allowed to drive or accept a ride to the hospital in order to provide company to their relative at the hospital, since this may be life-saving. One may also be needed at the hospital to sign potentially life-saving consent forms.

==== Telephone ====
If a medical emergency is known or suspected that warrants placing a phone call rather than transportation in a motor vehicle, the telephone may be used. If the situation has a lower level of urgency, the receiver shall be removed and the buttons pressed in shinuy, or an unusual manner (e.g., by using the elbow or the knuckles, or a pencil). If the person involved is expecting a call to be returned to deal with the issue, answering the phone is permitted, and if another uninvolved person has placed the call, the person involved shall state, for example, that they are waiting for a call from the doctor.

==== Work ====
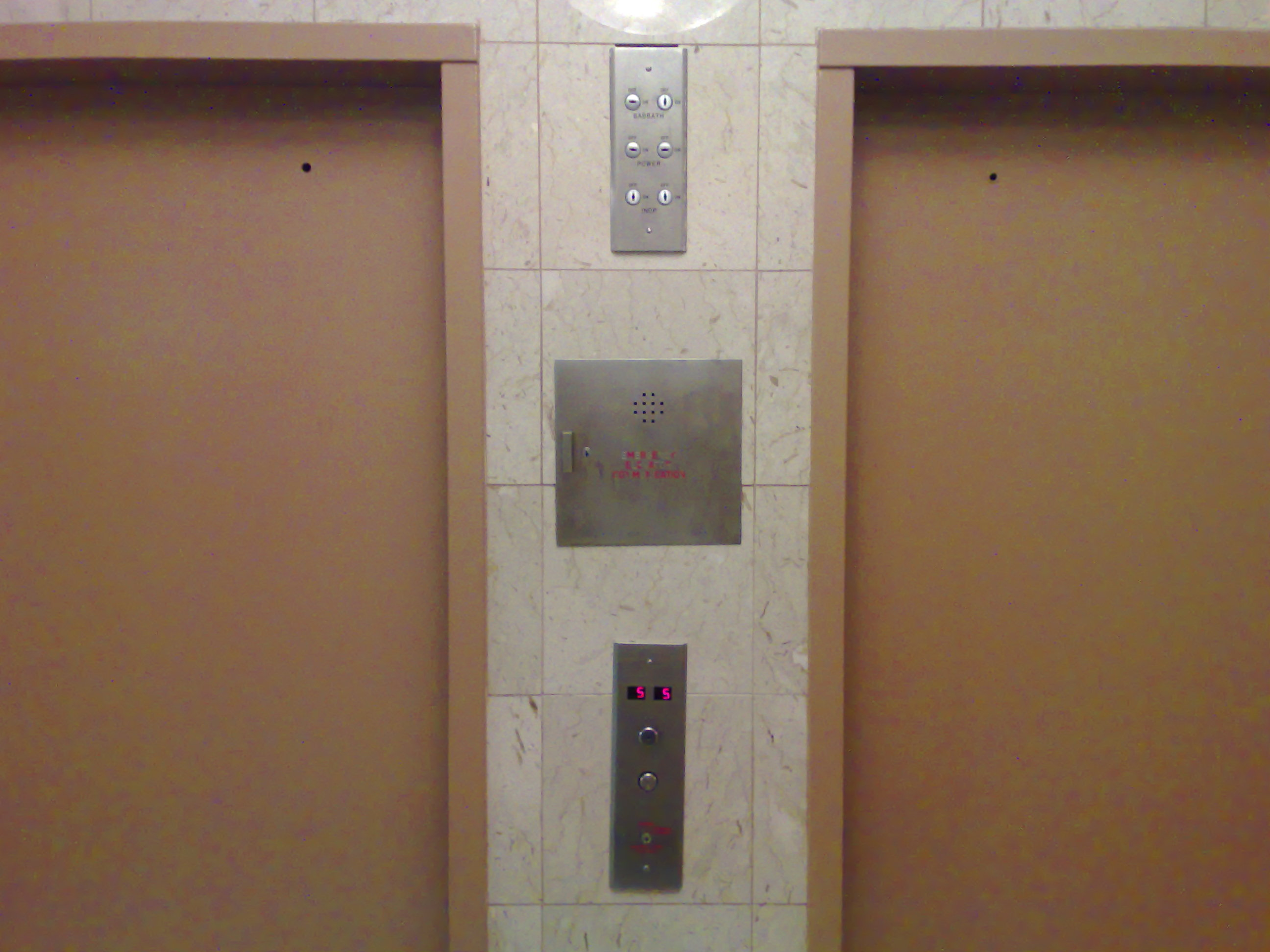
Shabbat elevators

It is permissible for one whose profession it is to save lives (such as a physician, nurse, or emergency medical technician) to work on Shabbat in order to save lives. It is permissible even for such a professional to use a telephone or pager to be alerted to their need for a life-saving act or to communicate life saving information, or to travel by any means necessary to the location where the potentially life-saving act will be performed. Some hospitals, such as Mount Sinai Hospital, have a designated Shabbat elevator for staff and visitors to use on those days; the elevators automatically stops on every floor, so that the observant persons do not have to push a floor button, which would be work.

One is not allowed to work on Shabbat due to economic hardships, no matter how severe their circumstances are.

=== Eating ===
==== Non-kosher food ====
Non-kosher food may be eaten under the following circumstances:

- If no kosher food is available to the person, and failure to eat the non-kosher food may result in starvation
- If a non-kosher food product specifically is needed to cure an illness

If necessary for recovery, a patient may eat non-kosher foods. In the Babylonian Talmud, Chapter 82a of Tractate Yoma mentions pregnancy cravings for non-kosher food (the passage discusses a pregnant woman who craves pork on Yom Kippur) as the paradigmatic example of a presumed life-threatening situation where a person is allowed to eat non-kosher food (and is permitted to eat it on Yom Kippur).

==== Fasting ====
On Yom Kippur, the fast preferably may only be broken if one is advised by a physician not to fast, and then consults a rabbi regarding the physician's advice. The general practice is to eat only as much as is necessary in order to satisfy one's needs. If one is advised by a physician not to fast, but is unable to consult a rabbi, one should eat in accordance with the physician's advice.

If one senses they may have a health problem that may be aggravated by fasting, but no physicians or rabbis are available to give advice, they should use their own judgment, and are permitted to refrain from fasting. A pivotal principle is that The Heart Knows its Own Bitterness, based on tractate Yoma in the Babylonian Talmud. In such cases, one must not delay eating in order to speak with the appropriate authority, or feel guilty for eating in this situation.

One who must eat on Yom Kippur is required to eat only as much as is necessary to avoid aggravating a medical condition. Fasting, as much as possible, takes priority over prayer (and thus more should not be eaten merely to enable one to attend synagogue or pray with more concentration). All blessings normally recited before and after eating are recited as usual.

Fasts other than Yom Kippur are viewed more leniently. Anyone who feels unable to fast is permitted to break the fast without consulting a physician or rabbi.

On all fasts, one who is taking a medication for any reason is permitted to use food or water as necessary to aid in taking the medication. If the medication has instructions to consume food or beverage with the medication, one is not permitted to fast, and they need not further consult a physician or rabbi.

A person who becomes severely dehydrated during any fast shall consume sufficient fluids to restore their body to normal hydration levels.

==== Waiting for the proper time to eat ====
Rabbinical law prohibits eating at certain times even on non-fast days, such as prior to daily morning prayer, prior to the recitation of kiddush on Shabbat or Yom Tov, and between the ending of Shabbat and Havdallah. In particular, these laws are to strictly be followed by adult males and should be followed by adult females who are not pregnant or nursing. While it is optimal to wait out these shorter periods of time rather than eating, even for one whose medical condition demands frequent eating, there are exceptions:

- A pregnant woman or a woman who is nursing a baby who has a craving shall eat without delay. For all other women and for boys yet to have reached bar mitzvah age, these laws are treated more leniently.
- One who must take a medicine at a specific time may consume any food or drink necessary in order to consume the medicine or that must be eaten with the medicine.
- A person who is severely dehydrated may consume fluids as necessary to restore their body to normal hydration levels.
- A person who lacks the strength to perform the necessary service without nourishment may eat the minimum amount necessary to perform the service with kavanah.

== Exceptions ==
There are some Jewish laws that may not be violated, even when a life is in danger. In these cases, a life must be sacrificed, rather than Halakha be broken. These include:

=== Idolatry ===
Idolatry in Judaism, known as Avodah Zara (עבודה זרה, lit. 'strange/foreign worship') is inclusive not only of idol worship, but of any attempt to visually depict God. A famous example of this is found in the Talmudic rendition of Hannah and her seven sons, which states that the family was martyred to avoid worshiping idols. Despite the heavy prohibition, Rabbinical commentary makes exceptions for Jews forced to abandon Judaism or raised without sufficient knowledge of it.

=== Forbidden sexual relations ===
Forbidden sexual acts may not be done, even if necessary to save a life. In Orthodox Judaism, these acts include:

- Adultery
- Homosexuality
- Incest
- Zoophilia

Although interfaith marriage is not permitted in Orthodox Judaism, even in case of pikuach nefesh, Esther's marriage with the king of Persia is not regarded as a sin, because she remained passive, and risked her life to save that of the entire Jewish people.

=== Murder ===
Any act that intentionally causes the death of another person (considered to be an act of murder), that injures a person, so that the potential for death from the injuries is high, or that otherwise creates a dangerous situation that will very likely put one or more lives at risk, is not permitted for the preservation of life. Forbidden examples are:

- Harvesting organs from the body of a person who is clearly alive
- Live organ donation, where the risk of death to the donor is extremely high. If the risk is low, the donation is permitted.
- Driving at a very high speed in order to reach a hospital if a crash with an innocent motorist is almost assured

==== Exceptions to the rule against murder ====
An exception in which killing another person is permitted is the case of a rodef (aggressor), who may be killed in order to save the life of oneself or another person. This permits wartime killings and killings in self-defense, or to save another from an aggressor in Judaism. Abortion is also permitted in Jewish law if the unborn fetus is endangering the mother's life, because the fetus is then considered to be a rodef. The rodef assertion is also used to permit the separation of conjoined twins when it is likely or even certain that one will die as a result of the operation if this is necessary to save the other.

==== Life for a life ====
While one is not permitted to automatically give up one's life in order to save the life of another (an act of suicide, forbidden in Jewish law), one may risk their own life to save the life of another. It is, however, forbidden to place one's own life at more risk than the other person is already in. One may not put another's life in danger, especially against that person's will, in order to save their own life or that of another.

Scholars have long questioned whether or not stealing is permitted in order to save a life. Most have concluded that stealing sustenance from a poor person is prohibited under life-threatening circumstances, since the life of a poor person who loses even a small portion of their sustenance is considered to be endangered. Also, operating a business or similar operation that intentionally robs or defrauds the poor of all or any part of their sustenance is strictly forbidden, even to save a life. Robbing or defrauding a large business, organization, or the government is forbidden if the poor will suffer as a result of the business, organization, or government losing these funds. If a business suffers the loss of money due to fraud or theft, it may pass the losses onto customers by raising its prices, and as a result, the poor may have to spend more. The government, if cheated, may raise taxes, even to the poor, or cut services from which the poor benefit.

The commandment to save life may also have reference to ethical arguments regarding torture.

== Contemporary examples ==
A ZAKA delegation, a rescue team made up of Haredi men, worked in the Haitian capital of Port-au-Prince soon after the 2010 Haiti earthquake. They took time to recite Shabbat prayers, and continued to work throughout Shabbat.

"We did everything to save lives, despite Shabbat. People asked, 'Why are you here? There are no Jews here', but we are here because the Torah orders us to save lives ... We are desecrating Shabbat with pride ..."

— Mati Goldstein, commander of the Jewish ZAKA rescue-mission to 2010 Haiti earthquake

During the COVID-19 pandemic in 2020, many religious authorities supported the concept of social distancing, even overriding the requirement to pray in a minyan and other religious mandates through live-streaming. Different denominations of Judaism approached the challenges of the pandemic in their own ways. For example, while many mainstream Orthodox authorities agreed that avoiding the risk of disease was worth missing an in-person service, communities of Haredi and Hasidic Jews continued to gather in synagogue.

== See also ==
- Right of self-defense
- Shinuy, the unconventional performance of a normally forbidden act such that it is justified in Jewish law
- Taqiyya, dissimulation or denial of religious belief in the face of persecution in Islamic law
