= Walter Jacob =

American Reform rabbi (1930–2024)

Rabbi Walter Jacob
- Walter Jacob, c. 2000

Personal life
- Born: March 13, 1930 Augsburg, Bavaria, Germany
- Died: October 20, 2024 (aged 94) Pittsburgh, Pennsylvania, U.S.
- Spouse: Irene Loewenthal (m. 1958; died 2012)
- Children: 3
- Education: Drury College

Religious life
- Religion: Judaism
- Denomination: Reform Judaism

Jewish leader
- Position: Rabbi Emeritus
- Synagogue: Rodef Shalom Congregation
- Began: 1955
- Ended: 1997
- Semikhah: Hebrew Union College

Walter Jacob (March 13, 1930 – October 20, 2024) was an American Reform rabbi. He was rabbi at the Rodef Shalom Congregation in Pittsburgh from 1955 to 1997. He served as chairman of organizations such as the Central Conference of American Rabbis and World Union for Progressive Judaism. Jacob wrote a book, Christianity Through Jewish Eyes in 1974, leading to interfaith dialogue. He founded the Solomon B. Freehof Institute for Progressive Halakhah in 1991, an international forum for Jewish law. In Germany, he co-founded the Abraham Geiger College, the first rabbinic seminary in Central Europe since the Holocaust, in 1999.

== Biography ==
Jacob was born in Augsburg, Germany, on March 13, 1930, into a family with rabbinic tradition for 17 generations. His father was Ernest Israel Jacob, district rabbi in Augsburg, and his grandfather was Benno Jacob, who was regarded as a great liberal Jewish bible commentator. His mother was Annette Loewenberg Jacob, and he grew up with a brother, Herbert. His father was deported to the Dachau concentration camp in 1938 for several months. Helped by American relatives, the family managed to flee Germany in 1939, first to London, and a year later to the United States. They settled in Missouri in 1943.

=== Studies and academic career ===
Jacob graduated with a B.A. from Drury College in Springfield, Missouri in 1950. He was ordained as a rabbi and received a Master of Hebrew Letters (M.H.L.) from the Hebrew Union College (HUC) in Cincinnati in 1955. He earned his D.H.L. in 1961 from HUC, which also granted him an honorary doctorate in 1975.

Jacob was adjunct professor at the Pittsburgh Theological Seminary from 1968 to 1974. He served as overseer of Jewish Institute of Religion at the Hebrew Union College and chairman of the publications committee of Hebrew Union College Press from 1976 to 1999.

He received an honorary doctorate from Drury College in 1990.

=== Congregation ===
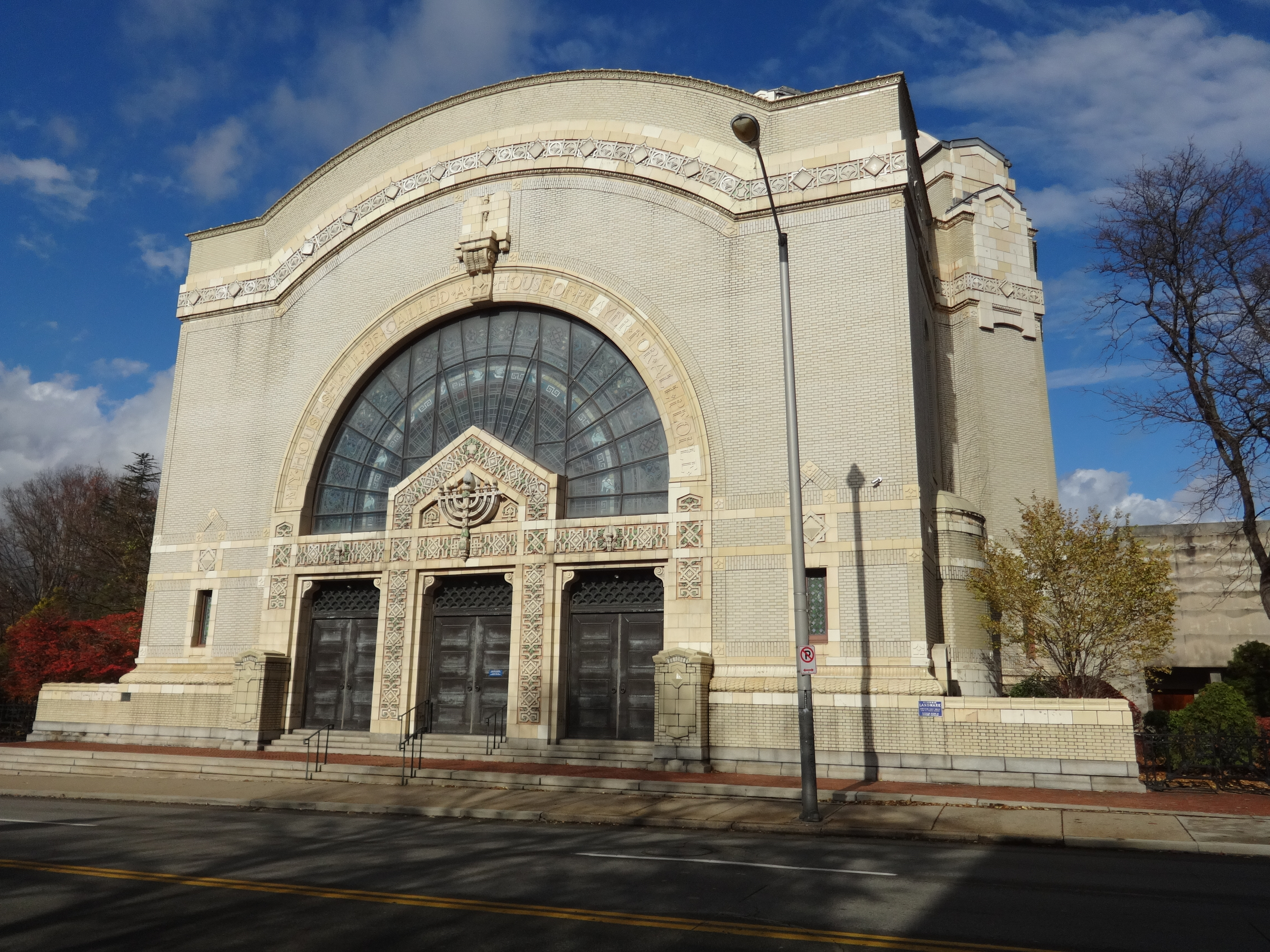
Rodef Shalom Temple

Following ordination, Jacob was named assistant rabbi at Rodef Shalom Congregation in Pittsburgh, Pennsylvania, under Rabbi Solomon Freehof. He served as a chaplain in the U.S. Air Force in the Philippines during the years 1955–57. In 1966, Jacob succeeded Freehof as senior rabbi, becoming emeritus in 1997. He served families over several generations. He continued the work of his grandfather, translating Benno Jacob's biblical commentaries.

=== United States ===
Jacob was chairman of the Responsa committee of the Central Conference of American Rabbis from 1967 to 1990. He was president of the Religious Education Association of America from 1981 to 1985. He served as vice president of the World Union for Progressive Judaism, and chairman of its International Responsa Committee from 1990 to 1994, and was president of the Central Conference of American Rabbis from 1992 to 1994, emphasizing a broader Reform interpretation of the Jewish law (halakhah). He also served as chairman of the Associated American Jewish Museums which he had co-founded, to organize free art exhibits in synagogues and Jewish centers.

=== Interfaith ===
Jacob took a leading role in interfaith dialogue with his book Christianity Through Jewish Eyes, first published in 1974 and revised in 2007, which led to close friendship with Catholic bishops. Jacob was awarded the Order of St. Gregory the Great from Pope John Paul II in 2005.

=== Jewish law ===
Jacob founded the Solomon B. Freehof Institute for Progressive Halakhah in 1991, an international forum for Jewish law that he served as its first chairperson. It holds seminars on Jewish law annually in North America, Europe and Israel and has published books including War and Terrorism in Jewish Law, The Sexual Issues in Jewish Law, and The Internet Revolution and Jewish Law.

=== Germany ===
Jacob and a few others worked towards rebuilding liberal Judaism in Germany from 1990. He served as the honorary rabbi of the liberal Beth Shalom congregation in Munich from 1996 for several years. He co-founded the Abraham Geiger College, the first rabbinic seminary in Central Europe since the Holocaust, as part of the University of Potsdam in 1998, serving as its president.

Jacob was made a Knight Commander of the Order of Merit of the Federal Republic of Germany in 1999. He received an honorary professorship from the State of Brandenburg. Augsburg honored him with a special award in 2014, and he said then, in memory of the outbreak of the First World War: "We are realists — memories haunt us, just like the horrors of our time — but we will never be pessimists. Even on this day of dark memories, we look to a bright future." In 2021, the seat of the Abraham Geiger College was named after him, Walter Jacob Building.

=== Publications ===
Jacob published 43 books and more than twelve hundred essays, sermons, and monographs on a range of topics which include responsa, Jewish theology, biblical studies, interfaith dialogue, modern Jewish problems, and gardening.

=== Personal life ===
Jacob was married to Irene Gitta Loewenthal, a horticulturalist, from 1958. She was born in Hamburg, Germany and also had rabbis in her family. They had three children, Claire Helene, Kenneth Gabriel and Daniel Benjamin. They worked and published together, establishing Rodef Shalom Biblical Botanical Garden, the largest biblical botanical garden in North America in 1986 and publishing in that field. The couple were interested in classical music, art, theater, going outdoors and traveling. Irene died in 2012, and her husband took care of the Biblical garden as a living memorial.

Walter Jacob died at home in Pittsburgh on October 20, 2024, at the age of 94.

== Books ==
- Jacob, Walter, Christianity Through Jewish Eyes New York, 1974, 1982, 287 pp.ISBN 978-0-87068-257-5
- ---- The Changing World of Reform Judaism – The Pittsburgh Platform in Retrospect. 1985 ISBN 978-0-915138-79-1
- ---- Liberal Judaism and Halakhah, A Symposium, 1988, ISBN 978-0-929699-00-4
- ---- and Irène Jacob, The Healing Past, Pharmaceuticals in the Biblical and Rabbinic World, 1993, ISBN 978-90-04-09643-1
- ---- and Irène Jacob, Gardens of North America and Hawaii – A Traveller's Guide, 1985, ISBN 978-0-88192-017-8
- ---- and Benno Jacob, The Second Book of the Bible – Exodus interpreted by B. Jacob, translated and introduced, 1992, ISBN 978-0-88125-028-2
- ---- with Moshe Zemer, Death and Euthanasia in Jewish Law, 1995, ISBN 978-0-929699-06-6
- ---- with Moshe Zemer, Sexual issues in Jewish Law: essays and responsa, 2006, ISBN 978-0-929699-17-2
- ---- Fetus and Fertility in Jewish Law, 1995, ISBN 978-0-929699-07-3
- ---- Aging and the Aged in Jewish Law, 1998, ISBN 978-0-929699-08-0
- ---- Israel and the Diaspora in Jewish Law, 1997, ISBN 978-0-929699-09-7
- ---- Crime and Punishment in Jewish Law, 1999, ISBN 978-1-57181-197-4
- ---- The Environment in Jewish Law, 2003, ISBN 978-1-57181-431-9
- ---- Poverty and Tzedakah in Jewish Law, 2006, ISBN 978-0-929699-18-9
- ---- War and Terrorism in Jewish Law, 2010, ISBN 978-0-929699-22-6
- ---- The Internet Revolution in Jewish Law, 2014, ISBN 978-0-929699-25-7
