= Eruv (disambiguation) =

An eruv is a religious-legal enclosure which permits carrying in certain areas on Shabbat.

Eruv may also refer to:

- Eruvin (Talmud), a tractate in Moed
- Eruv tavshilin ("mixing of cooked dishes"), which permits cooking on a Friday Holiday to prepare for Shabbat
- Eruv techumin ("mixing of borders"), which permits travel beyond the city boundary ("techum") on Shabbat

== See also ==
- EREV, a class of motor cars
