= 2017–2018 Bergen County eruv controversy =

Establishment of religion controversy

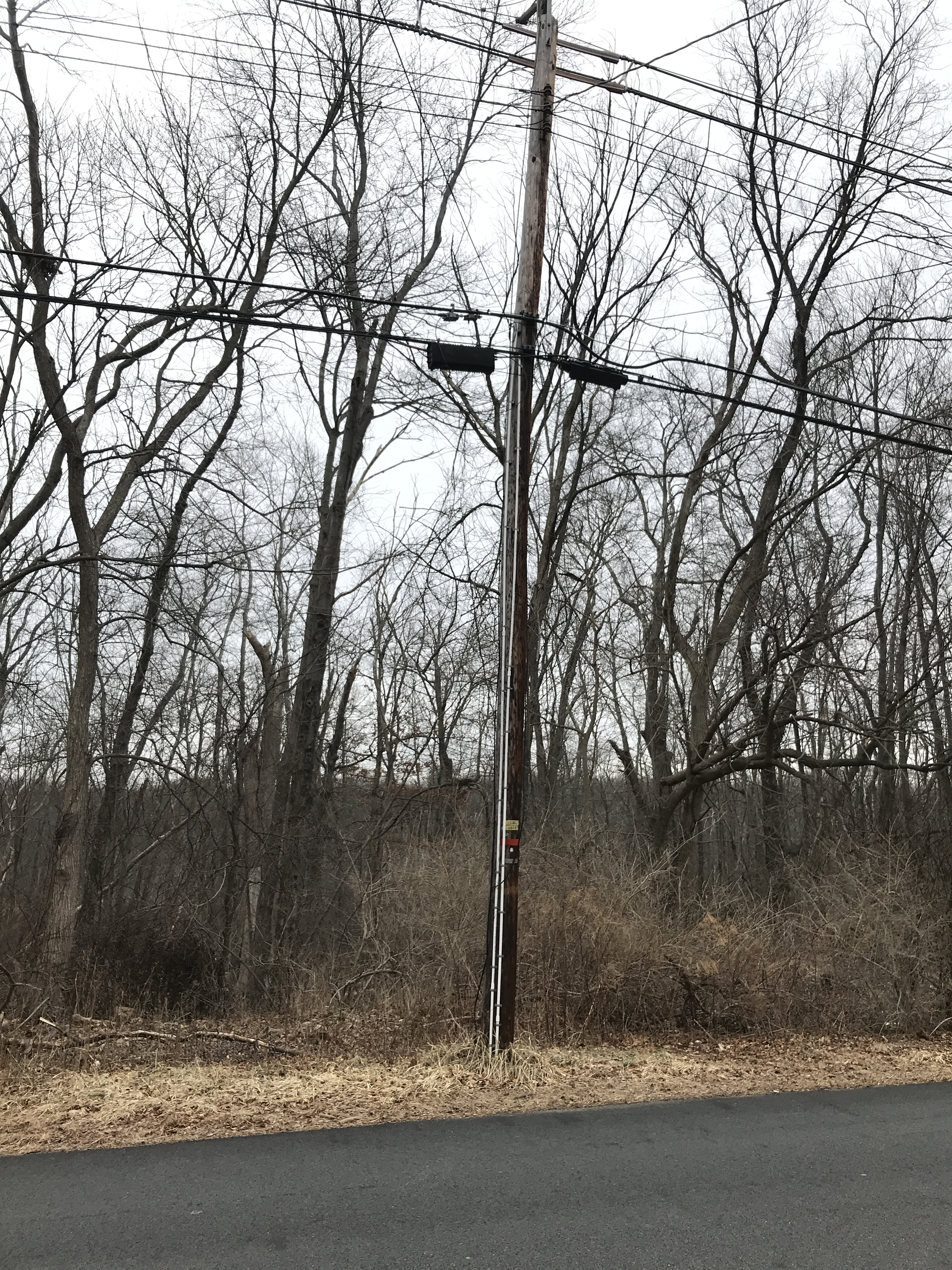
- Utility pole with lechis attached, Mahwah, New Jersey
- Date: July 2017 – September 2018
- Location: Mahwah, New Jersey Upper Saddle River, New Jersey Montvale, New Jersey
- Outcome: Eruv remained and completed under settlement between the eruv association and the three municipalities. A lawsuit by the New Jersey Attorney General against Mahwah was settled.

In July 2017, the municipalities of Mahwah, Upper Saddle River, and Montvale in Bergen County, New Jersey, in the United States, opposed extension of an eruv within their borders. An eruv is a land area surrounded by a boundary of religious significance, often marked by small plastic pipes (called lechis) attached to utility poles. The demarcation permits Orthodox Jews to push or carry objects (such as prayer books, keys, or baby strollers) within the eruv on the Jewish Sabbath that otherwise is considered forbidden under Orthodox Jewish law.

The three municipalities ordered that the borders of the eruv be dismantled having been erected without the appropriate consents. Many Mahwah residents protested against the prospect of Orthodox Jews from Rockland County, New York using local parks or seeking to buy homes there.

After no agreement could be reached, the eruv association brought suit against each of the municipalities. Mahwah's actions in passing a township ordinance to bar nonresidents of New Jersey from its parks, and the hostility of some residents and council members towards those who supported the eruv led Democratic candidate for Governor of New Jersey Phil Murphy and others to make accusations of antisemitism. The presiding judge in the lawsuits, John Michael Vazquez, in January 2018 made it clear he felt the municipalities did not have a strong case and urged them to settle. The three municipalities settled with the eruv association, allowing the eruv borders to remain. Mahwah settled a lawsuit from the New Jersey Attorney General accusing it of discrimination.

== Background ==
Bergen County, New Jersey. Mahwah is the large area at upper left (northwest), with Upper Saddle River and Montvale the next to the east along the state line (at top).

Location map of Bergen County in New Jersey. Rockland County in New York is seen, in part, to the north.

The township of Mahwah, and the boroughs of Upper Saddle River and Montvale, are neighboring municipalities in northwestern Bergen County, New Jersey. All three are adjacent to the state line with New York, on the other side of which is Rockland County, where there are large communities of Orthodox Jews.

An eruv (plural "eruvin", or sometimes "eruvim") is an enclosure defined by string, rope, wires, cables, etc., that allows observant Jews, including the Orthodox, to carry or push objects further than is normally permitted on the Jewish Sabbath (or Shabbat). Normally, on Shabbat, an object may not be taken from a private domain, such as a house, into a public one, such as a street or sidewalk, or moved, in a public area, more than 4 cubits (about 6 feet; 1.7 meters). "Domain" is a technical term referring to how enclosed an area is, not property ownership.

Objects may be moved freely if they remain within a private domain, and an eruv effectively extends the private domain through the area it encloses, including streets and sidewalks. The boundary of an eruv is often marked by utility poles surrounding a given area, with the space between regarded as doorways, topped by lintels, the telephone or power wires. The poles are regarded as doorposts and are marked by lechis (singular: lechi), solid objects such as lengths of twine or of plastic pipe, which run from near the ground to just below the wires. In short, the act of stringing such a boundary around a public area by a Jewish community creates the pretense for its members that that public area is enclosed for the limited purpose of allowing the members to do some otherwise forbidden things in that public area on the Sabbath.

There are many requirements for eruvin; the Talmud devotes an entire tractate to the subject. This complexity makes rabbinic supervision and regular inspection mandatory. An operating eruv allows observant Jews to carry prayer books from home to synagogue on Shabbat, or to push strollers or baby carriages.

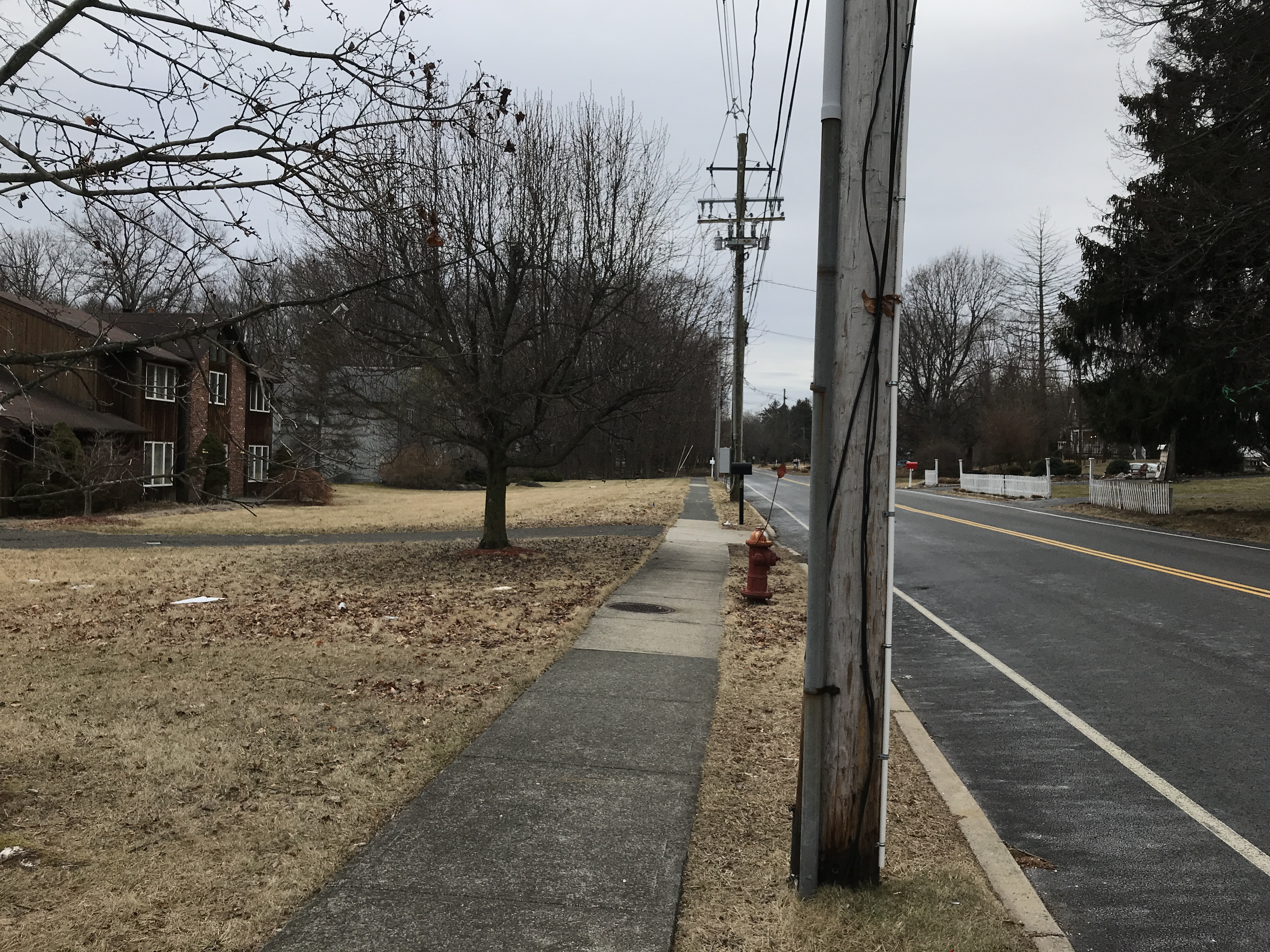
An eruv boundary, Airmont, New York. Note the white plastic lechi at right of nearest pole.

In Teaneck, in southeastern Bergen County and home to large numbers of Orthodox Jews, an eruv has existed since the 1970s with little controversy, and, as the Jewish population increased, was extended to nearby Bogota and Bergenfield. Other eruvin in Bergen County are in Fair Lawn and in Paramus.

A previous instance in which an eruv had been constructed in Bergen County, and had been challenged by local authorities, occurred in Tenafly, in the eastern part of the county. Attempts by municipal authorities to ban eruvin had failed when challenged in the federal courts, and the settlement in 2006 after a six-year battle obliged the borough to pay $325,000 for the eruv association's legal costs. In most cases involving conflict over whether an eruv should be permitted, the municipality has lost and the construction of the eruv allowed to continue.

== Construction and controversy ==
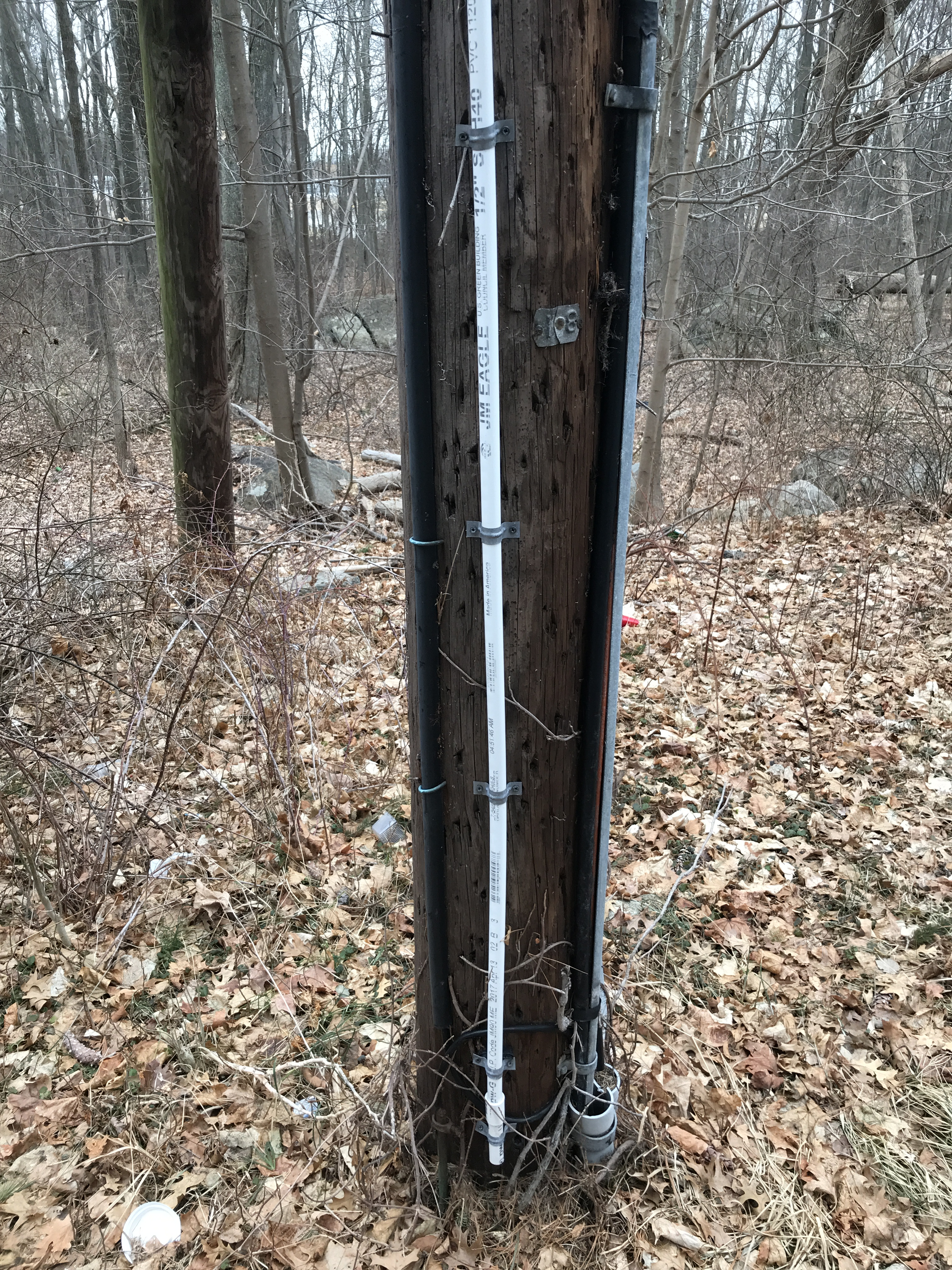
Portion of a lechi attached to a utility pole, Mahwah, New Jersey

Orthodox Jews in Rockland County gained a license from Orange and Rockland Utilities (which serves parts of both Rockland County in New York and Bergen County in New Jersey) to construct an eruv using its utility poles in 2015, and in March 2017 the company granted permission for the South Monsey Eruv Fund to install lechis, made from white PVC pipe, on its utility poles in northwestern Bergen County. This was an extension of an existing eruv in Rockland County and was intended to run through Mahwah, Upper Saddle River and Montvale. According to Rabbi Chaim Steinmetz, head of the eruv association, the purpose was to accommodate those living in Rockland County close to the border, near New York State Route 59. The boundaries had to be run through New Jersey due to the lack of a road along the state line. Mahwah police noted construction being done on utility poles in May and made inquiries. On learning that Orange and Rockland had authorized the work, they provided police protection, for which the department was paid about $2,000 by the eruv fund. The work in Mahwah was complete by June.

When the matter became generally known in mid-July, there was what local reporter Tom Nobile called a "firestorm of opposition" from local residents, with some expressing concerns that the eruv would allow Orthodox communities in Rockland County to expand into New Jersey. Groups formed on social media, including one named Mahwah Strong, in opposition to the eruv. Mahwah Strong claimed 3,000 members within days; a founder, Robert Ferguson, stated that his group would act as a check and balance to ensure the township enforced its laws, noting, "I don't view this as a hostile takeover of the town." Two hundred people gathered in a Mahwah park on July 22 to support the eruv's removal. An online petition to "Protect the Quality of Our Community in Mahwah", initiated by former township council member John Roth, reached 1,200 names before being taken down due to what Roth called inappropriate comments, made by some signers. Similarly, Mahwah Strong lost its Facebook page following an influx of comments deemed "hateful".

== Municipal and public reaction ==
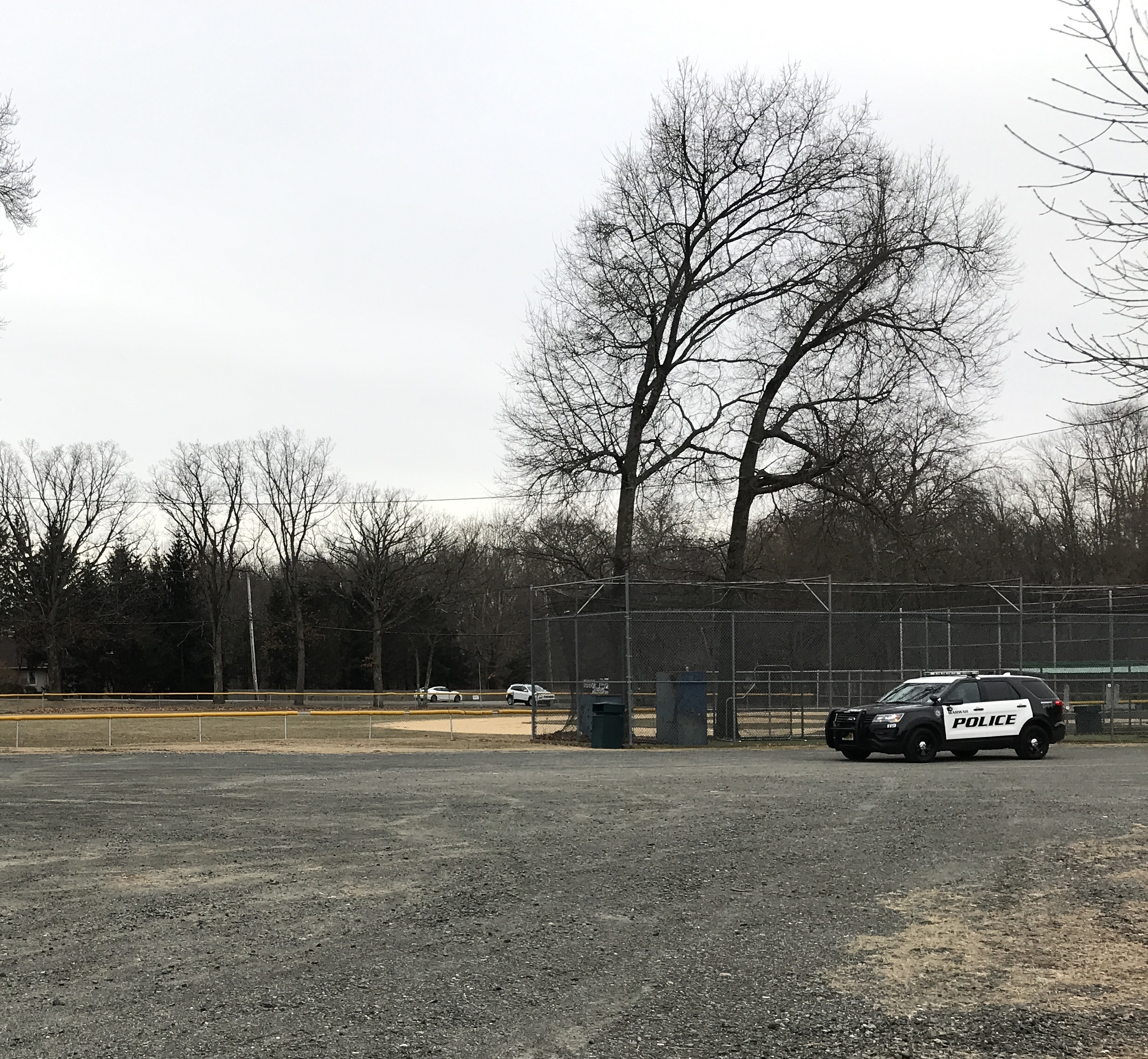
Mahwah tried to ban out-of-staters from its parks. Airmount Park shown; seen in 2018.

In early July 2017, the eruv was completed in part of Upper Saddle River. Montvale acted first against the eruv, with Mayor Michael Ghassali issuing a stop work order on July 10, after the eruv association had rented equipment and arranged with local police to provide security. Montvale authorities objected on the grounds that the lechis constituted a sign, forbidden by borough ordinance. This was done prior to construction with the result that the eruv did not extend into Montvale. On July 18, Upper Saddle River's attorney sent a letter demanding the removal of the lechis that had been erected there, with a deadline of July 26, but the borough agreed to let them remain for the time being after two New York State residents filed suit in the United States District Court for the District of New Jersey in Newark, requesting a temporary restraining order against the borough and Mayor Joanne Minichetti. The borough's agreement was in exchange for an undertaking from the eruv association not to expand the eruv, and the motion for a restraining order was withdrawn. The eruv was vandalized on July 26 and 27, requiring immediate repair work. Mahwah's township engineer, Mike Kelly, sent a letter to the eruv association on July 21, taking a stance similar to Montvale's and demanding the removal of the eruv by August 4. Mayor Bill Laforet stated, "This sends a very strong message to those who choose to violate our sign ordinances."

On June 29, the Mahwah Township Council had passed an ordinance, effective July 27, barring nonresidents of New Jersey from its parks. Residents had complained that out-of-staters were flooding Mahwah's parks, sometimes by the busload. After the ordinance passed, but before it went into effect, Mahwah police chief James Batelli received many phone calls from residents asking that it be enforced against Orthodox Jews. He contacted the Bergen County Prosecutor, Gurbir Grewal, for advice. On July 27, the date the ordinance was to go into effect, Grewal issued a directive ordering Mahwah police to disregard the ban, stating that the ban could lead to racial profiling, unlawful searches and seizures and the illegal targeting of Orthodox Jews. In response, Rob Hermansen, president of the township council, stated that that body would rework the ordinance to continue putting Mahwah residents first.

When the Mahwah Township Council met on the evening of July 27, it did so before an overflow crowd. Despite warnings from the township attorney not to discuss issues of religion, some did. Others complained of nonresidents crowding parks and claimed that they had been visited by people wanting to buy their homes. The lawyer for Mahwah Strong urged the council to enforce the law by requiring the takedown of the eruv. Ferguson was quoted as saying at the meeting, "We do not NOT want these people living in our neighborhoods. We want them following the law."

As the eruv controversy intensified, Mahwah and Montvale, as well as neighboring boroughs, enacted or made stricter ordinances restricting those making unsolicited offers to buy houses from knocking on doors. Municipal officials stated that this was being done because of the concerns of residents, who feared the Orthodox moving in would result in a population explosion, that the schools would suffer, and high-density housing built. Residents cited Lakewood in Ocean County as an example of such problems.

To a standing ovation from some 200 residents in attendance, the Mahwah council on August 10 unanimously voted to issue summonses because the eruv had not been taken down. Mayor Laforet, though, urged the council not to take this step, pointing to the large expense the unsuccessful eruv litigation had cost Tenafly, and advocated negotiation. In response to the council's action, the Bergen-Rockland Eruv Association (of which the South Monsey group is a part) and several Orthodox Jews resident in Rockland County filed suit in federal court against Mahwah on August 11, promising to defy any summonses. Residents of Teaneck and Englewood, each in southeastern Bergen County and home to large communities of Orthodox Jews, had gone to Mahwah and Upper Saddle River to make known their views at council meetings. Council members from Teaneck and Englewood had spoken there in support of the eruv's retention, only to meet a hostile reception. Citizens for a Better Upper Saddle River posted a screenshot of the Teaneck council schedule online, urging members to mark their calendars with the dates. Council member Mark Schwartz of Teaneck stated that visitors would be welcome at council meetings, where they could view how a diverse community functioned. Michael Cohen of the Englewood council stated, "We have repeatedly attempted to communicate to the leadership of Upper Saddle River and Mahwah why it is that the rhetoric and actions being seen and taken by certain members of their governing bodies and by certain members of their communities are being viewed by the outside world as anti-Semitic. However, those attempts have largely continued to fall on deaf ears."

== Litigation ==
Following failed settlement negotiations and a closed-door council meeting on October 10, the Bergen-Rockland Eruv Association and individual plaintiffs sued Montvale on October 18, alleging that Mayor Ghassali's stop work order inhibited them in practicing their religion. They cited a 2015 statement from then-mayor Roger Fyfe, from when rumors of an eruv had first circulated, that an eruv was a simple accommodation and a matter in which the borough had only a slight part. The plaintiffs also alleged that Mahwah and Upper Saddle River were aware of the eruv construction, but had no problem with it until they gave in to a campaign of xenophobia and antisemitism. The next day, the Democratic candidate for governor, Phil Murphy, accused the residents of Mahwah of causing an "overarching perception of anti-Semitism and discrimination". According to Murphy, "When a Holocaust survivor at a public meeting is heckled, and then denounced as a fraud, there is a problem. When well-intentioned residents are disparaged as 'paid actors' for a 'Jewish money conspiracy scheme' there is a problem."

On October 24, the Attorney General of New Jersey, Christopher Porrino, sued Mahwah and its council, alleging that by voting for the parks ban and for the summonses, they had violated the constitutional rights of Orthodox Jews. The case, filed in state court in Hackensack, sought nullification of the council's actions, statutory penalties, attorney's fees, and the return of $3.5 million in state-provided Green Acres funds with which Mahwah had purchased and maintained parks. Under the Green Acres program, parks benefitting from the funds may not discriminate, including on the basis of religion or residency. Porrino stated, "To think that there are local governments here in New Jersey, in 2017, making laws on the basis of some archaic, fear-driven and discriminatory mindset, is deeply disappointing and shocking to many, but it is exactly what we are alleging in this case. Of course, in this case we allege the target of the small-minded bias is not African-Americans, but Orthodox Jews. Nonetheless, the hateful message is the same." Mayor Laforet accused Council President Hermansen of fear-mongering and stoking passions, "His disgraceful behavior is now worsened by the severe potential financial penalties facing the township's taxpayer." In the municipal election on November 7, Mahwah voters easily re-elected two anti-eruv council members, defeating challengers supported by Laforet. The case was removed from state to federal court by Mahwah on November 22 as it raised questions under the federal constitution. On December 1, the council voted unanimously to allocate $175,000 to fight the lawsuits, which supplemented the $90,000 previously appropriated.

In the Upper Saddle River case, on October 10, 2017, the eruv association moved for a preliminary injunction allowing the eruv to remain pending the outcome of the litigation. In support, the association provided documentation showing that Mayor Minichetti had told the borough council about the proposed eruv in 2015, and the new sign ordinance had rapidly followed. In response to the motion, filed on November 2, Upper Saddle River stated that the sign law was tightened because of a divisive municipal election in 2014, that had seen many signs. The borough argued that the lawsuit was premature, as the eruv association had not sought permission. It argued that it had not violated the constitutional rights of the plaintiffs; its sign ordinance was content-neutral, banning all signs of whatever sort, and thus the plaintiffs had not been discriminated against. It alleged that permission to erect the lechis from Orange and Rockland was insufficient; the eruv association also had to comply with local law, and in any event the communications company Verizon had joint use of the poles and had not been asked for consent. Upper Saddle River distinguished its situation from that of Tenafly, stating that in Tenafly, exceptions had been made to the sign ordinance, but in Upper Saddle River it had been strictly enforced. Towards the end of December, Montvale Mayor Ghassali indicated that his borough was negotiating with the plaintiffs, seeking to reach an amicable settlement of the federal lawsuit.

== Settlements ==
Murphy was elected governor in November and designated Bergen County Prosecutor Grewal as the new Attorney General. Thus, once they took office, opponents of Mahwah's position would hold powerful posts in the state capital of Trenton, and municipal officials began to have second thoughts about whether to fight the eruv. On December 14, 2017, following the advice of legal counsel, the Mahwah council repealed the still-unenforced ban on out-of-state park users and abandoned an attempt to amend the sign ordinance to bar "other matter" (the lechis) from being affixed to utility poles. The "other matter" language would have imitated the 2015 changes to the Upper Saddle River sign law which had followed Minichetti informing the borough council about the plans for the eruv, and was withdrawn, according to Hermansen, lest Mahwah's motives be misinterpreted. The vote to repeal the park ban was unanimous, with one council member absent. After the vote, Laforet called the ordinances "ill-advised" before being silenced by the council. He resumed outside the council chamber and disclosed that the members could have faced prosecution. "They are hiding from you that if they failed to do so, the Attorney General can come into Mahwah to press civil or criminal bias charges. For people who did a lot of shouting, and shouting down the past several months, they are strangely quiet about that."

The Upper Saddle River lawsuit was scheduled for argument before Judge John Michael Vazquez of the federal court for New Jersey. When he convened that hearing on January 9, 2018, rather than hear the lawyers argue the positions set forth in the legal briefs, Judge Vazquez told them his views. He questioned whether the borough had consistently enforced the ordinance, as plaintiffs' lawyers had discovered a number of signs and even mailboxes attached to utility poles, that Upper Saddle River had not taken down. The judge voiced his skepticism that the 2015 sign ordinance had been passed because of a contentious municipal election the previous year, as the borough maintained, and indicated that he was inclined to believe it was passed because of the eruv. He urged Upper Saddle River to try to settle the case in coordination with the other two municipalities—he was also presiding judge in those cases.

On January 30, 2018, the Mahwah council voted 5–2 to accept a negotiated settlement of the eruv litigation, despite some residents who urged the council to fight all the way to the Supreme Court. Council President Hermansen supported the deal as the best possible outcome, "We're trying to do the right thing. This is a good town with good people, and we're making this decision for good people." He wrote on Facebook that Mahwah "should be known more for our open space, parks and our overall community than the negative comments made about our residents from outsiders." The terms of the settlement were not announced at that meeting as the deal was still pending agreement by the plaintiffs, but were disclosed the following day. The eruv would remain, but the lechis were to be painted to match the pole, or replaced with ones of that color, The township was to pay the association $10,000 or such other sum as mutually agreed for legal fees. The association was allowed to expand the eruv, but was to consult with the council before doing so. On February 7, a public meeting that was called for that day to discuss the terms of the settlement was postponed to a future date on the advice of the township's attorneys.

Montvale also undertook negotiations with the eruv association plaintiffs. Some Montvale residents sought to minimize the land covered by the eruv within the borough by having the boundary run through backyards close to the state line, but the consent of all landowners could not be obtained. On February 13, the Montvale council voted to approve a settlement whereby the eruv boundary would be placed on streets in the northern part of the borough, with efforts to be made to reroute it through private land. Montvale was to pay the eruv association attorneys at Weil, Gotshal & Manges LLP $10,000 towards legal costs and be shielded from further lawsuits from it for two years. Yehudah Buchweitz, an attorney for the eruv association, stated: "Our lawsuit against Montvale was filed to permit an eruv in a small portion of Montvale, so families could enjoy the same religious freedom as so many others throughout Bergen and Rockland counties and beyond. This settlement preserves and protects the people's right to have an eruv." A map showing the eruv boundary's route through Montvale was posted on the borough website on March 1, 2018.

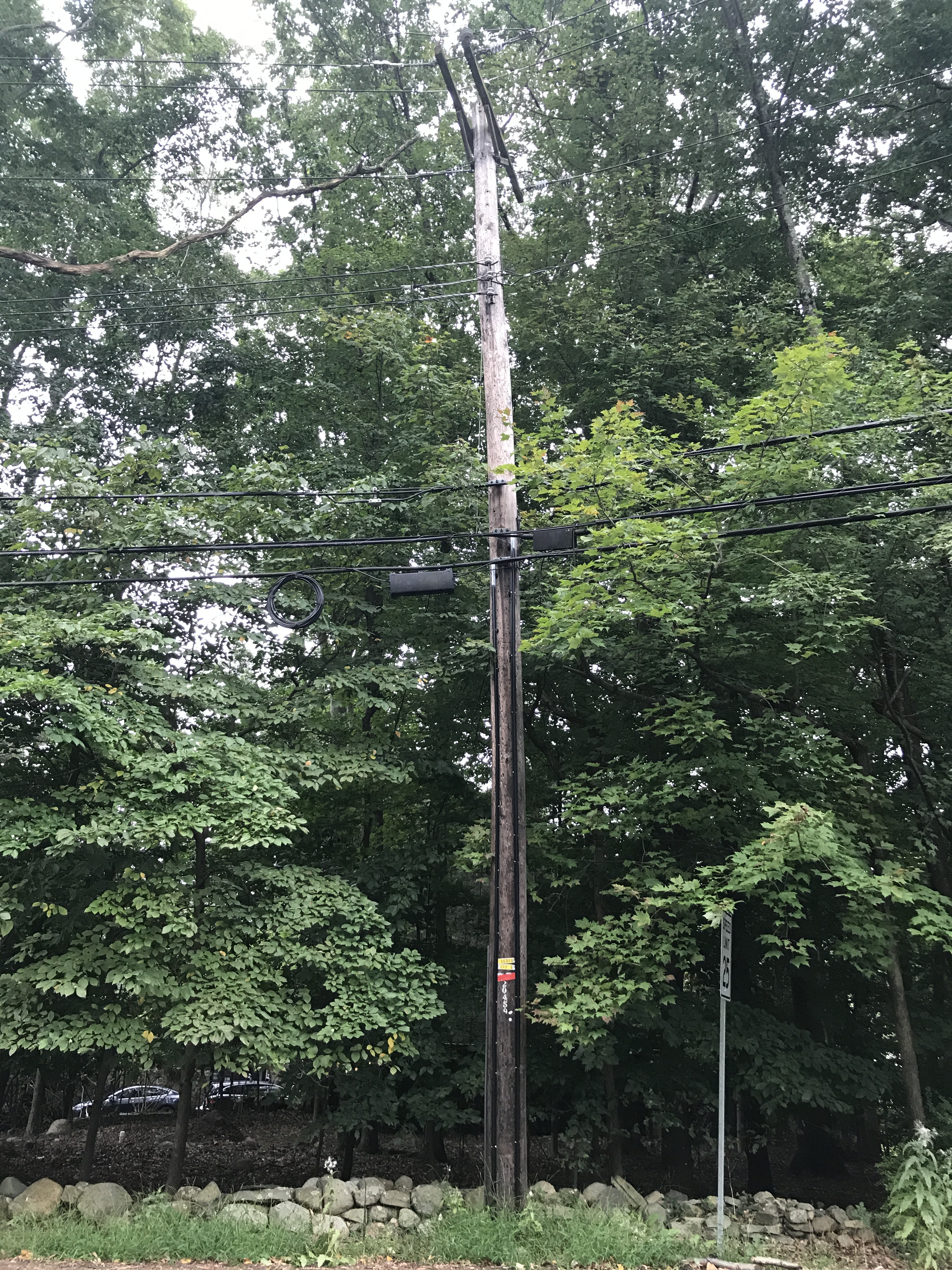
A telephone pole with black lechis, Upper Saddle River. Seen in September 2018.

After a closed-door meeting, the Upper Saddle River Borough Council voted on January 15 to attempt to reach a settlement with the plaintiffs. On February 21, the borough announced over its emergency notification system that it had reached a tentative agreement whereby the eruv boundary would be run along the roads until it could be relocated as close to the state line as possible. The borough stated that the agreement was being entered into "because of a variety of reasons outside of the Borough’s control, including the recent settlements by Mahwah and Montvale". The borough agreed to pay $75,000 towards the eruv association's legal costs. The agreement went into force on April 5, 2018. Under the agreement, 12 poles were to be erected on the municipal right-of-way to allow the eruv boundary to run on a shortened route through the borough, close to the state line. The lechis were to be made of black plastic, and the eruv association was not allowed to not ask for a change of route for three years.

On February 15, 2018, Judge Vazquez accepted the Mahwah and Montvale settlements, and on April 19, that of Upper Saddle River. He retained continuing jurisdiction over the matters and granted permission for them to be re-opened if a dispute was to arise. A temporary eruv boundary was run across the original Upper Saddle River route, pending a final routing. On July 17, 2018, Upper Saddle River posted maps and stated that work on implementing the settlement would occur over the following several weeks.

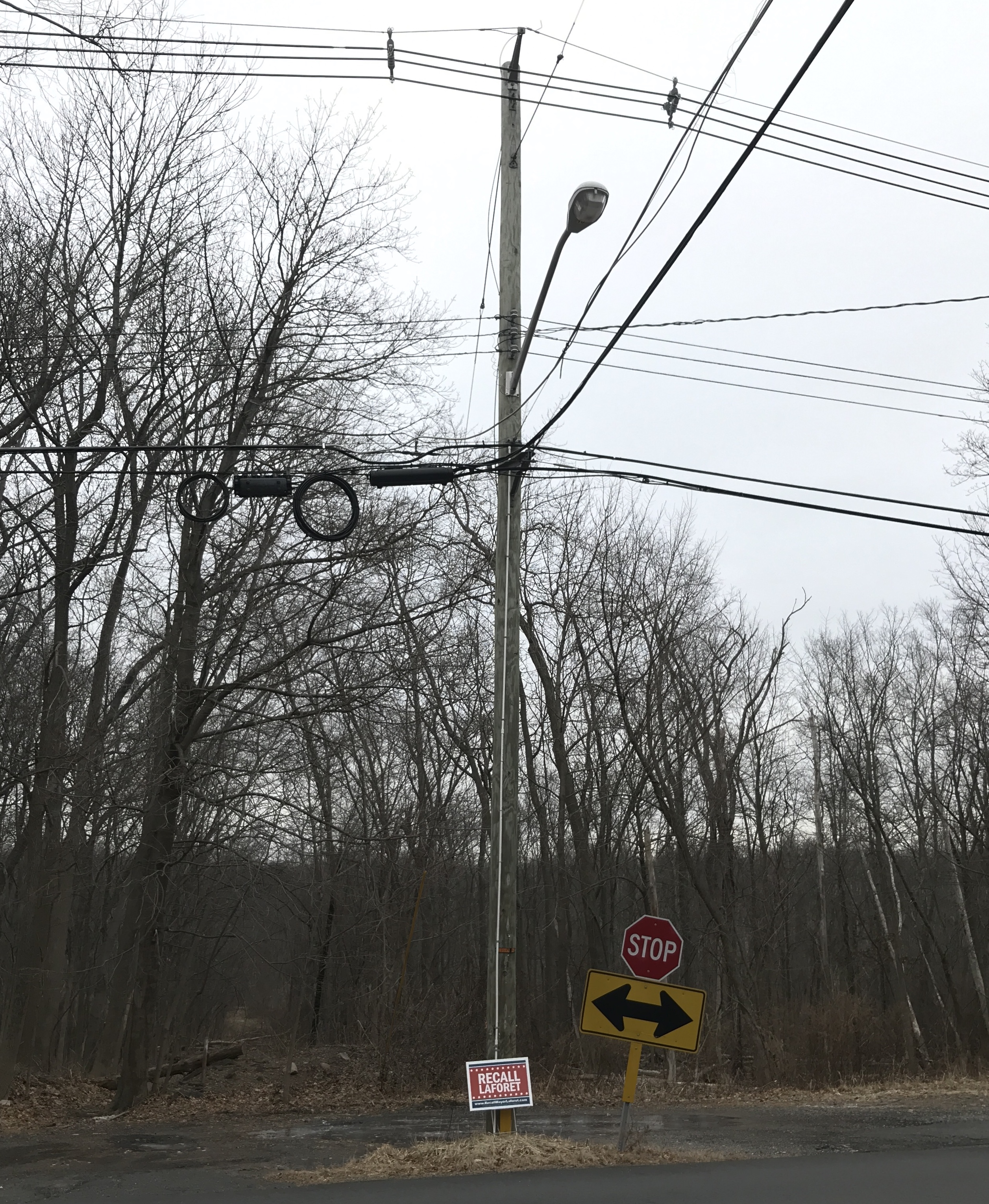
A lechi from the extended eruv rises above a sign urging Mayor Laforet's recall, Mahwah. Seen in February 2018.

In September 2018, a settlement between the Attorney General and Mahwah was announced. The township was to repeal the two controversial ordinances and agreed not to enact the new sign ordinance and to notify the Attorney General of any proposed legislation on these subjects for the following four years. The mayor and council were to issue a joint statement affirming that the existing sign ordinance, and those dealing with parks and recreation, would be enforced in a nondiscriminatory manner. A breach by Mahwah within the four-year period risked penalties of up to $100,000; a proposed $350,000 fine was suspended.

On November 6, 2018, Mahwah voters recalled Laforet from office, electing John Roth in his place. Hermansen was defeated for re-election, with Robert Ferguson among those elected to the new council.
