= Eruv =

Enclosure allowing activities normally prohibited on Shabbat

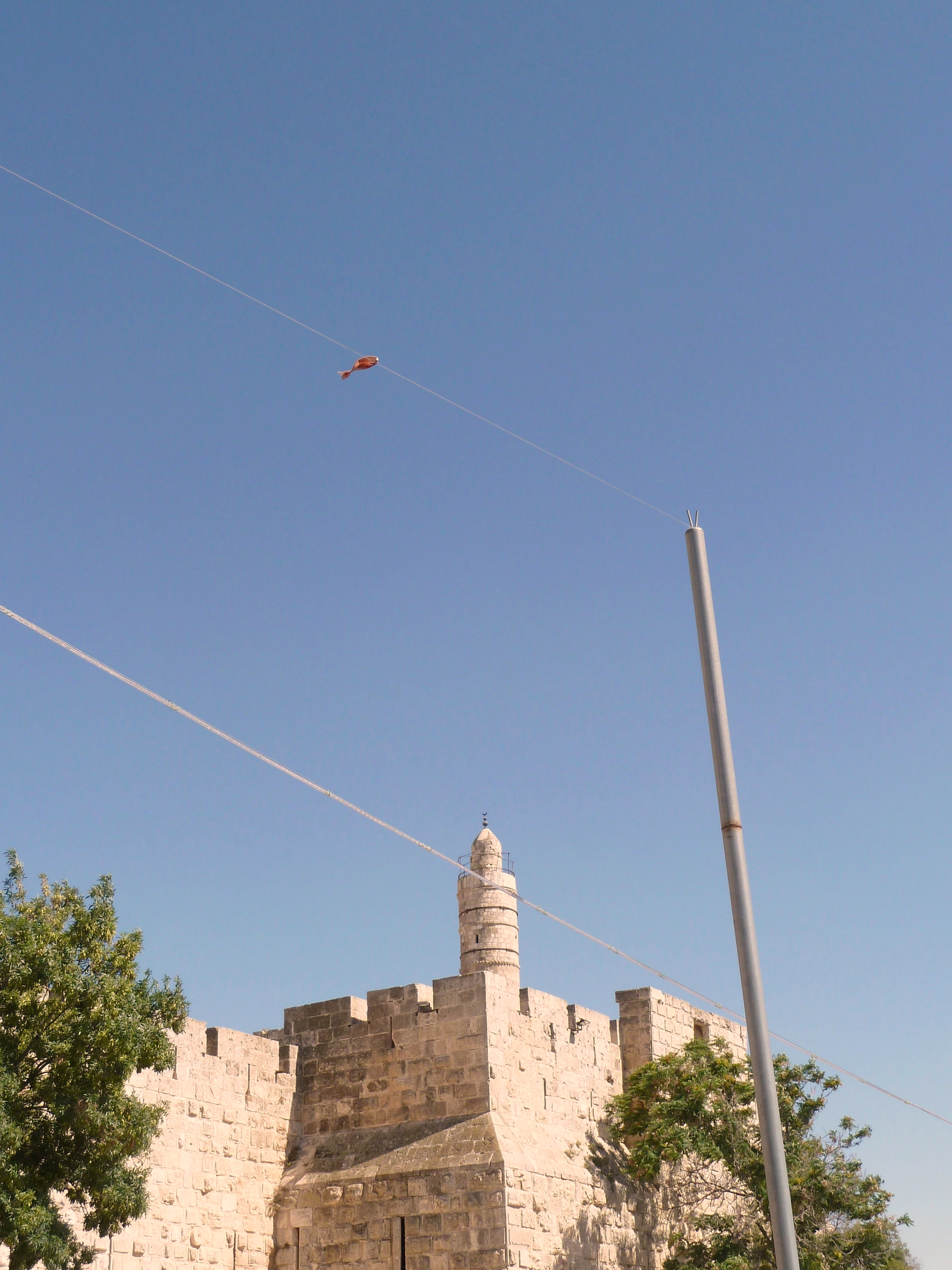
An eruv pole and wire outside the Tower of David, Jerusalem. Only the higher of the two visible wires is used by the eruv.

An eruv ([(ʔ)eˈʁuv]; Hebrew: עירוב, lit. 'mixture' (Note: Also transliterated as eiruv or erub. Aramaic plural: eruvin [(ʔ)eʁuˈvin]. Hebrew plural: eruvim.)) is a ritual halakhic enclosure made to allow Orthodox Jews to carry objects outdoors, which is normally prohibited on Shabbat. With an eruv, Jews can carry their house keys, tissues, medication, babies, and other objects, and can use strollers and canes – all of which are otherwise forbidden.

An eruv accomplishes this by symbolically integrating a number of private properties and spaces such as streets and sidewalks into one larger "private domain" by surrounding them with ritual walls. Often a group constructing an eruv obtains a lease to the required land from a local government.

== Definition ==
=== The prohibition of transferring between domains ===
In Jewish tradition it is commonly said that "carrying" is forbidden on Shabbat. Specifically, "transferring between domains" (הוצאה מרשות לרשות) is considered one of the 39 categories of activity prohibited on Shabbat. It facilitates a tradition of a communal meal by allowing food to be carried from house to house on Shabbat. The eruv itself is the communal meal, but the eruv borders are often referred to as the eruv.

The halacha of Shabbat divides spaces into four categories:

- Private domain (reshut hayachid), such as a house
- Public domain (reshut harabim), such as a very busy road
- Semi-public domain (karmelit), which includes most other places
- Neutral domain (makom patur), such as the flat space on top of a pole

A domain is defined as public or private based on its degree of enclosure, not its ownership, although a privately owned place can never be defined as a public domain. The rules here are complex, and expertise is needed to apply them.

On Shabbat, it is forbidden to transfer an object from one domain to another, including from one person's house to another adjacent house. The only exception is transferring to or from a neutral domain (which is rarely relevant).

In addition, it is also forbidden to transfer an object for a distance of 4 cubits (approximately 2 metres; 7 feet) within a public domain or karmelit (כרמלית).

While biblical law prohibits carrying objects between private and fully public domains on Shabbat, rabbinic law extends this restriction to carrying between a private domain and a semi-public karmelit as a safeguard of the biblical law. The rabbinic prohibition of carrying between a private domain and a karmelit is relaxed whenever an eruv is in place.

=== Eruv chatzerot ===
The term eruv is a shortening of eruv chatzerot (עירוב חצרות), literally a "merger of [different] domains" (into a single domain). This makes carrying within the area enclosed by the eruv no different from carrying within a single private domain (such as a house owned by an individual), which is permitted.

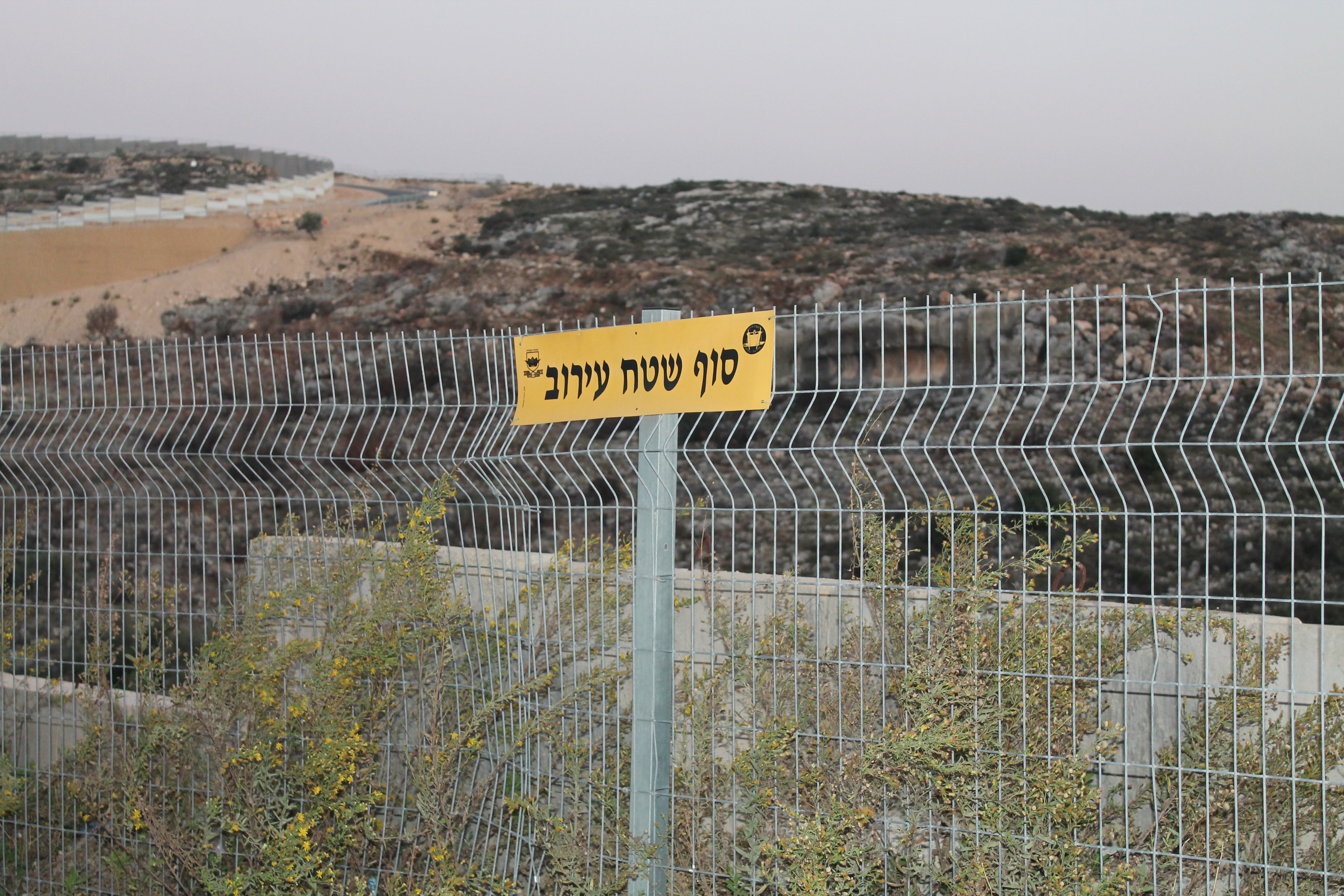
A fence being used as an eruv boundary in Israel

The eruv typically includes numerous private homes, as well as a semi-public courtyard whose ownership is shared by them. To enact the merger of the homes and courtyard into a single domain, all home owners as well as owners of the courtyard must pool together certain foodstuffs, which grants the area of the eruv the status of a single private domain. As a precondition for this merger, the area must be surrounded by a wall or fence.

In many cases (for example, within an apartment complex or walled city) the demarcation of the shared area consists of real walls or fences. Building walls may also be used, and in some cases so may a natural wall such as a river bank or steep hill.

Walls may include doors and windows. As such, the wall may even consist of a series of "doorframes" with almost no wall between them. Poles in the ground form the "doorposts" of the doorframe, and rope or wire between the poles forms the "lintel" of the doorframe. In modern cities, it is typical for the majority of an eruv to consist of such doorframes, using utility poles and wires.

When a "doorframe" is used as part of an eruv, it is required that the "lintel" rest on top of the "doorpost", rather than being attached to the side of the "doorpost". Since the "lintel" is frequently a utility wire which runs along the side of the utility pole, the pole cannot be used as "doorpost". In this case, an additional "doorpost", known in Hebrew as a lechi (pl. lechai'in), is attached to the side of the utility pole. This typically takes the form of a thin plastic pipe attached to the side of the utility pole, and the wire runs directly overhead of this pipe.

Within the walled area, a property transfer is needed to create the shared domain. This is formally effected today by having one resident give some "bread" to another resident to keep, to create a joint ownership of food for the whole community. This is usually done by the rabbi of the community to ensure that it is done correctly, and the bread is usually matzah to ensure that it will be edible and usable for a long time. (It is usually replaced once each year.) In the Talmud and other classic rabbinic sources, the term eruv refers to the bread itself.

A typical modern eruv encloses public streets as well as private houses, and thus requires agreement from the government authorities controlling those streets. Creating an eruv that involves public property requires that a government entity grant permission in order for the eruv to be valid. This is often done by issuing a symbolic proclamation which has no weight in secular law (see legal status).

=== Sources ===
In the Bible, Jeremiah 17:21–22 calls on Jews "not to bring any burden into the gates of this city". According to David Kimhi, carrying within Jerusalem was permitted because the city had an eruv bounded by the city walls, while carrying through the gates would mean carrying outside the eruv, thus Jeremiah's criticism focused on the latter form of carrying. While the Talmud limits the permission to carry to cities where the city gates are locked at night, the view that an entire city could have an eruv influenced later views that an eruv could encompass a "courtyard" covering a wide area.

== Specific laws of eruv ==
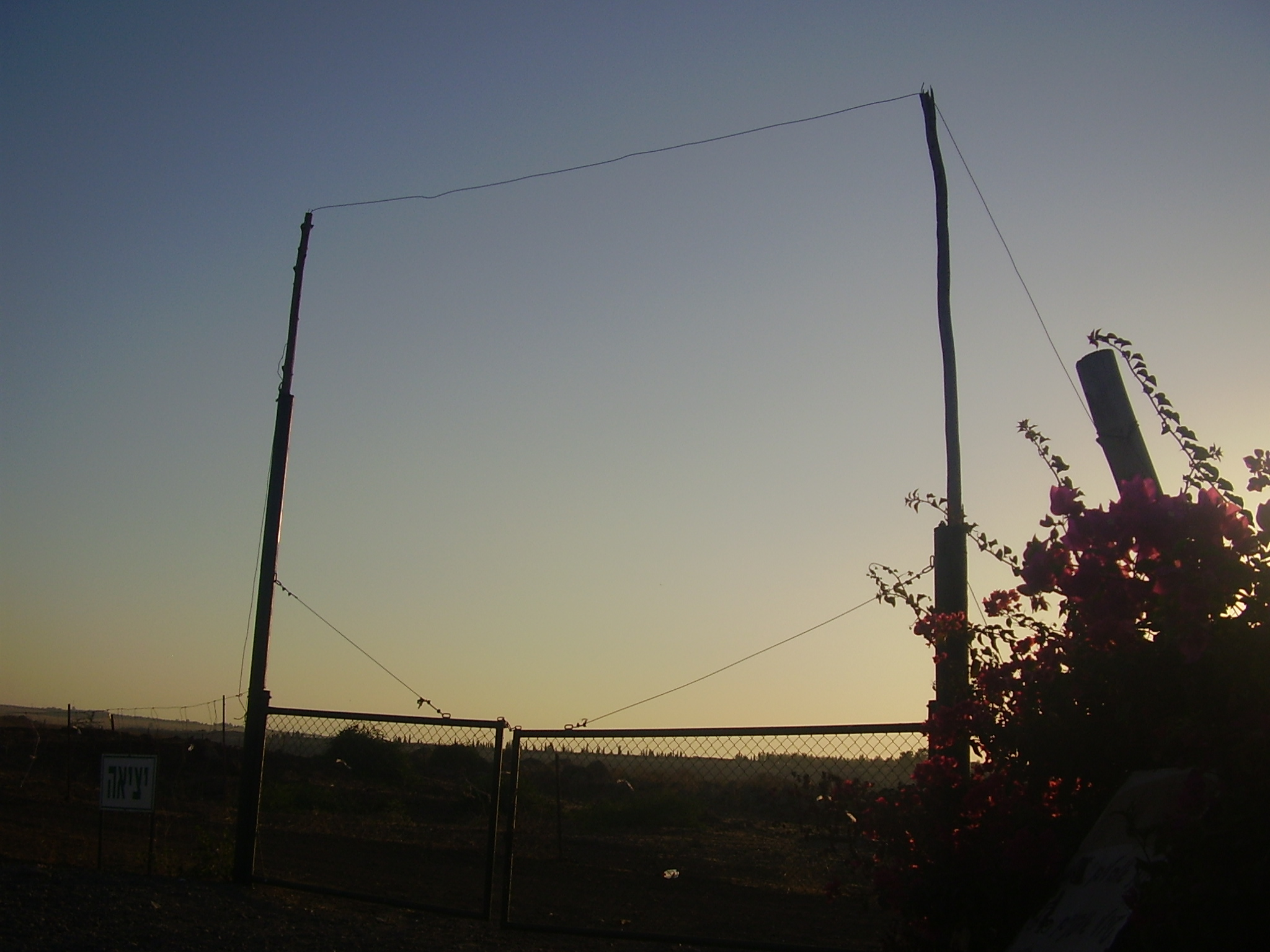
A gate in the eruv of Avnei Eitan, Golan Heights

In general, authorities agree that eruvin are subject to certain restrictions. For example, they can be located in only certain places, and may not be of indefinite size. A prohibition against walking too far outside city boundaries (techum, see Eruv techumin) limits the possible size of an eruv. Also, the eruv walls or doorways must be at least 10 tefachim (about 1 metre) in height.

The laws of eruv differ depending on whether the eruv contains only private domains and carmelit, or else public domains (reshut harabim deoraita) as well. If public domains are not included, the eruv wall may include "doorways" constructed out of wire and posts, with no actual door in them. If public domains are included, the wall must be an actual wall – every "doorway" must have a door in it, and these doors must be closed each night. This situation was common in ancient walled cities, but is rare nowadays. So in practice, eruvin are only built in areas that do not include a public domain.

What constitutes a "public area" is debated. The strict opinion holds that any road more than 16 cubits wide is a public domain, while the lenient opinion holds that a public domain must have both 16 cubits of width and 600,000 people passing through the road on a single day. In practice, most communities that build eruvin accept the lenient opinion, although certain neighborhood eruvin are able to use the more stringent opinion. However, in a few large cities such as New York City, it is possible that more than 600,000 people pass through certain roads in a single day. This would prevent building an eruv there even according to the lenient opinion. This possibility is the source of debates among the Jews in New York City regarding the validity of particular eruvin or any eruv.

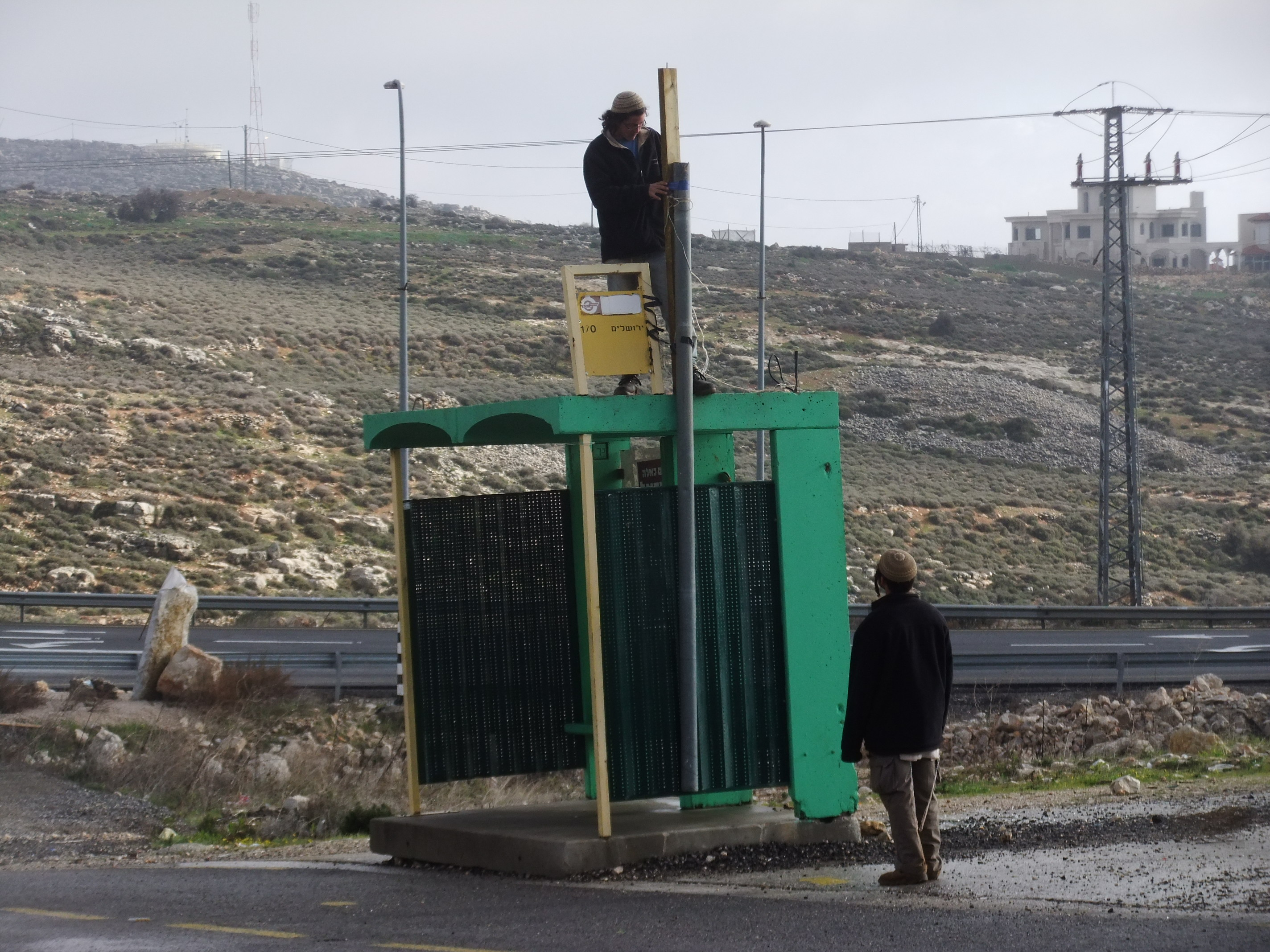
Preparation of an eruv between Oz Zion and Giv'at Asaf

In addition, the size of an eruv can be limited by a number of practical considerations. For example, the requirement that the eruv boundary be thoroughly checked each week and any needed repairs made before sunset on Friday limits the area that can be practically covered by a manageable eruv. The sensitivity of utility and public works crews about disturbing eruv-related attachments when making repairs can vary widely. Political and institutional differences, or differences about the correct interpretation of the relevant Jewish law, can also result in separate areas maintained by separate organizations.

=== Checking the eruv ===
The boundaries of an eruv must be checked regularly. If the boundary is not complete and contiguous in every element (i.e., one of the elements of the boundary is missing or broken), no valid eruv can exist that Shabbat, and carrying remains prohibited. Eruv associations generally maintain hotlines or web sites informing communities of the status of the eruv on Friday afternoon.

=== Activities prohibited even within an eruv ===
Though a valid eruv enables people to carry or move most items outdoors on Shabbat, all other Shabbat restrictions still apply. These prohibitions include:

- Handling (or, according to some, moving) objects that are muktzeh, whether indoors or outdoors.
- Opening an umbrella, which is analogous to erecting a tent, and falls under the category of construction. Since umbrellas may not be opened, they are muktzeh.
- Typical weekday activities (uvdin d'chol), 'to protect the sanctity of Shabbat'. The precise scope of this prohibition is subject to a wide range of rabbinic opinion.
- Moving or carrying items in preparation for a post-Shabbat activity (hakhana), unless one has a legitimate use for them on Shabbat itself.
- Many sports and sport-related activities: Many authorities consider balls muktzeh; others do not. In general, sports that result in holes or ruts being carved into the playing surface may be played only on surfaces that are not subject to such damage. Exercise of any kind is only permitted on Shabbat if done for the pleasure of the activity itself, rather than for other reasons such as health.

=== Disagreements among Orthodox groups ===
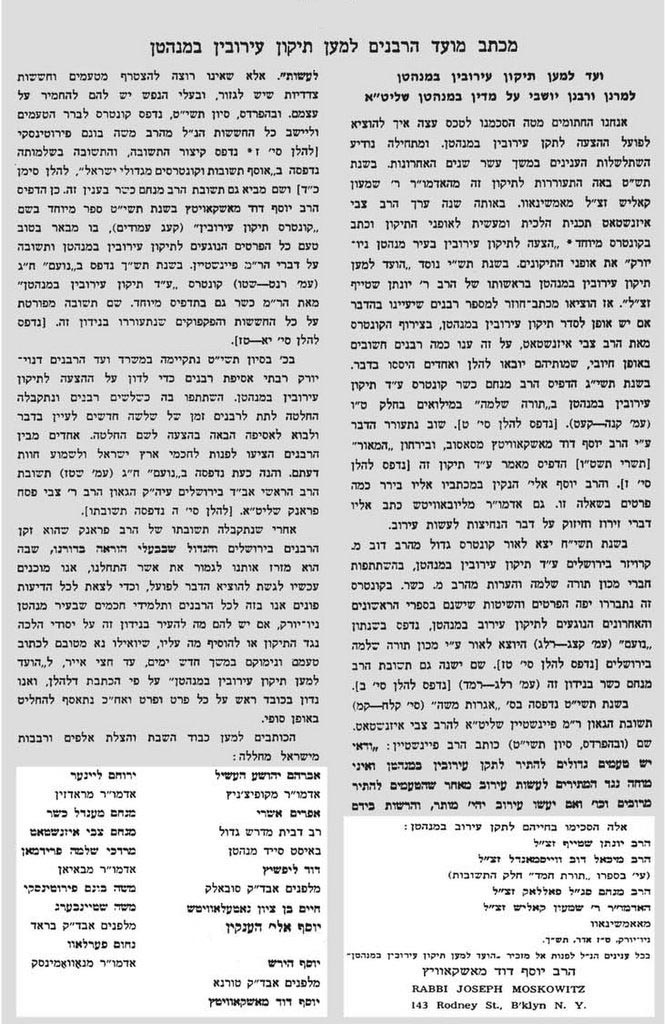
Letter by 14 rabbis supporting the Manhattan eruv, 1960

There exists disagreement between rabbis about some of the technical requirements of a valid eruv. Thus, there are instances where Orthodox rabbis dispute the validity of a particular eruv (and therefore instruct their followers not to use it), or even dispute whether any eruv can be built in a certain location.

One of the oldest halakhic disputes in the United States revolves around the issue of an eruv in Manhattan, New York. In 1905, Rabbi Yehoshua Seigel created an eruv on Manhattan's Lower East Side, bounded by seawalls which once protected the island as well as the Third Avenue El; however, some other rabbis ruled the eruv to be invalid.

In the 1950s, a proposal by Rabbi Menachem Mendel Kasher to establish an eruv in Manhattan gained the support of many prominent rabbis, including Rabbis Yosef Eliyahu Henkin, Dovid Lifshitz, and Ephraim Oshry, and the Kopishnitzer, Novominsker and Izhbitza-Radziner Rebbes. Other authorities, such as Rabbis Aharon Kotler and Moshe Feinstein, raised objections, and a major controversy ensued. In the end, the opposing Union of Orthodox Rabbis issued a declaration opposing it.

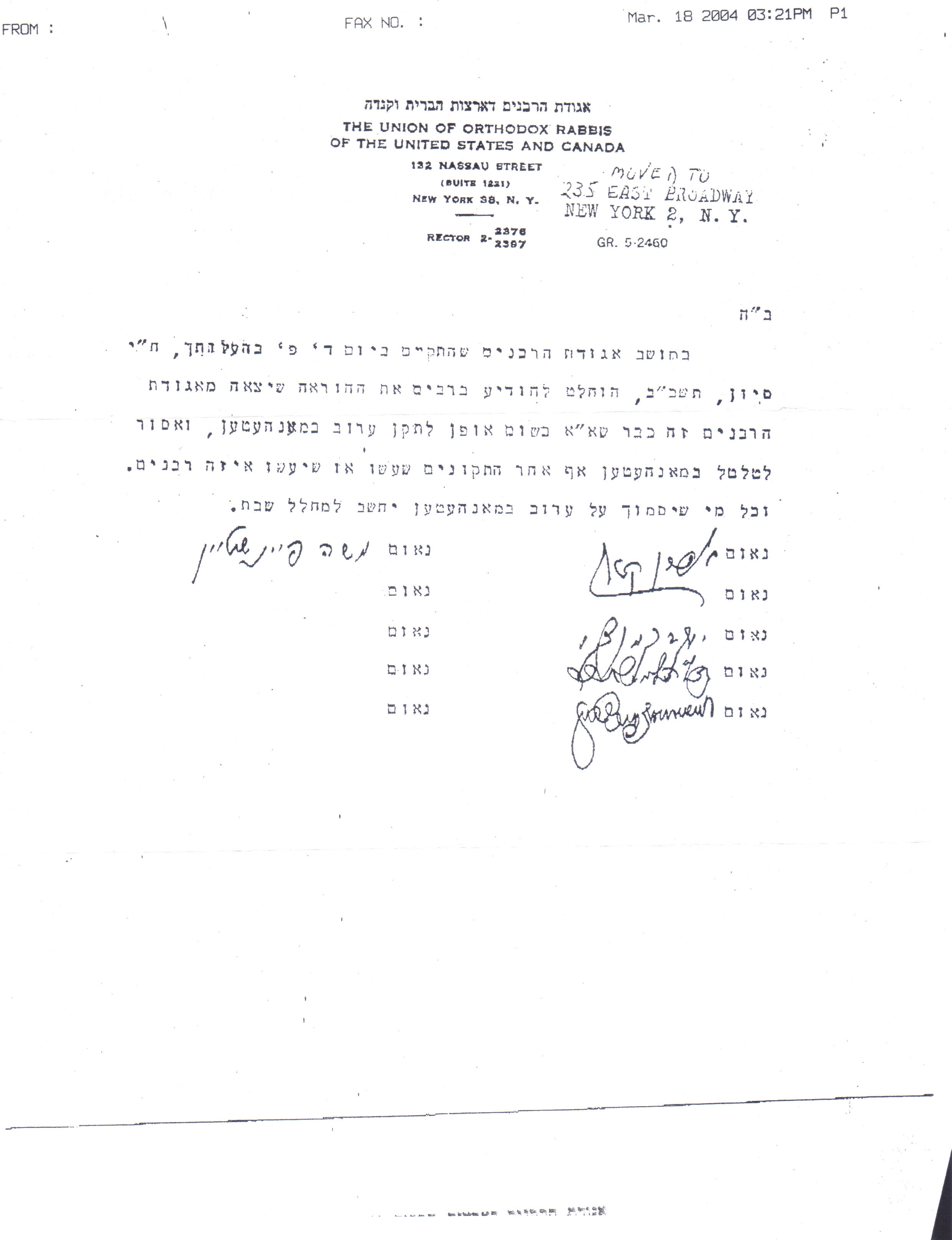
Prohibition by the Agudas Horabonim, 1962

In June 2007, the East Side portion of the internal Manhattan eruv was completed, offering an eruv within Manhattan to Orthodox Jews living on the East, Upper East, and Upper West Sides. That eruv expanded several more times and by 2018 it covered most of Manhattan south of 145th Street. There are also two eruvin in Washington Heights, Manhattan, one covering the Yeshiva University area and another that is part of Mount Sinai Jewish Center and covers the Fort Washington area. These eruvin are rejected by the Khal Adath Jeshurun community in Washington Heights.

Another ongoing dispute is the status of two inter-connected eruvin in Brooklyn: the Flatbush and Borough Park eruvin. The Borough Park eruv, from its initial construction, was rejected by most of the Hasidic community (though acceptance there has increased over time), and was rejected by most of the non-Hasidic "Lithuanian yeshiva" communities. The Flatbush eruv was originally built with the support of the Modern Orthodox community, and was later enhanced with the support of some local "non-Modern Orthodox" families. It was totally rejected by the many "Lithuanian yeshiva" communities led by the rosh yeshivas ("deans") of the large yeshivas Yeshiva Rabbi Chaim Berlin, Mir Yeshiva, and Yeshiva Torah Vodaas that are based in the Flatbush section of Brooklyn. In the Williamsburg section of Brooklyn, there is some dispute over the making of an eruv, with Zalman Teitelbaum, the Satmar rebbe of Williamsburg, leading the opposition to an eruv.

=== Eruv in Conservative and Reform Judaism ===
Although Conservative Judaism's Committee on Jewish Law and Standards enacted an exception to the general rules of Sabbath observance to permit driving to attend a synagogue, it otherwise formally requires the same rules of Shabbat observance as Orthodox Judaism with respect to carrying a burden. Therefore, Conservative Judaism's rabbinate requires the use of an eruv for ordinary carrying outside this exception. Some Conservative affiliated summer camps maintain an eruv., and a few Conservative synagogues do as well.

Reform, Reconstructionist, and other more liberal branches of Judaism do not call for observance of the underlying traditional rules against carrying, and hence the issue of an eruv is not relevant.

== Coping without an eruv ==
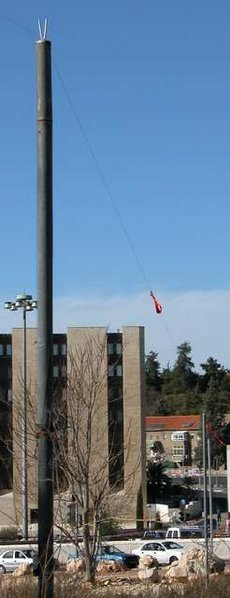
An eruv surrounding a community in Jerusalem

Many of those living in areas without an eruv are accustomed to life without one and have adapted their Shabbat practices accordingly. However, those who live in a place that has an eruv and are visiting a place without one, or if the eruv is temporarily out of service (perhaps due to wind or snow damage), may have difficulty making adjustments. Equally, those with young children, certain medical complaints, and certain disabilities often feel trapped during Shabbat.

Even without an eruv, there is no problem with wearing clothing outside, provided that it is normal clothing and being worn in its normal manner, as it is considered secondary to, and "part of" the person themselves. The same is true for most medical items that are attached to the body and can be considered secondary to it, such as a cast, a bandage, or eyeglasses.

Loose medicines may not be carried; most authorities have agreed that it is preferable that one who constantly needs medication remain at home rather than transgressing Shabbat by carrying medication. But, if such a person leaves home, then comes in need of medication, it is permissible under the laws of Pikuach nefesh to break Shabbat and bring the medication to the person. A small number of authorities in recent years have been permitting carrying the medication, however, since such a person may be tempted to leave home without it, and then his/her life may be endangered thereafter.

Many authorities allow the wearing of jewelry by women. As for a wristwatch, it could be seen either as an adornment (permitted to wear) or as a tool (forbidden to carry); therefore opinions are divided on whether men may wear wristwatches.

In communities without an eruv, it is customary to create belts, bracelets, necklaces, or similar wearable objects incorporating housekeys so that the keys can be worn rather than carried when going outdoors. To be validly "worn" rather than "carried", the key needs to be an integral part of the belt, bracelet, or other item rather than simply attached to it. It may be either an adornment if worn in a manner visible to others or a component needed to keep the wearable object fastened. Special "shabbos belts" and similar items that incorporate this property are sold in religious stores.

A tallit may be worn while walking to/from the synagogue, as it is considered clothing. Prayer books and other books may not be carried; either they must be brought to the synagogue prior to Shabbat or else the congregation's prayer books must be used.

== Communities with eruvin ==
In Israel, almost every Jewish community is enclosed by an eruv. In many Israeli cities there are multiple eruvin. For example, in Jerusalem, the Jerusalem rabbinate maintains an eruv around the whole city, the Edah HaChareidis maintains its own eruv around major portions of the city, and most chareidi neighborhoods have their own small eruv with higher standards, some of which do not rely on the above-mentioned leniency of 600,000. Outside Israel, there are over 150 community eruvin, as well as thousands of private ones enclosing only a few homes, or linking a synagogue to one or more nearby homes. Most major cities in North America have at least one, often surrounding only the Orthodox Jewish neighborhoods rather than the entire city. For example, Mexico City has an eruv that encircles and connects various neighborhoods with notable Jewish populations. Outside North America, there are eruvin in Antwerp; Amsterdam; Bury, Greater Manchester (Whitefield); Budapest; Gibraltar; Johannesburg; London; Melbourne; Perth; Montevideo; Rio de Janeiro; São Paulo; Strasbourg; Sydney; Venice and Vienna.

=== Historical ===
In modern times, the agreement of non-Jewish authorities to the establishment of an eruv is documented as early as 1790 in the Habsburg monarchy.

== Controversies ==
The installation of eruvin has been a matter of contention in many neighbourhoods around the world, with notable examples including the London Borough of Barnet; Outremont, Quebec; Tenafly, New Jersey; Agoura Hills, California; Westhampton Beach, New York; and Bergen County, New Jersey.

Some authorities have interpreted Jewish law as requiring the local government to participate in the process as owners of the sidewalks and streets by giving permission for the construction of the eruv. In addition, because municipalities and utility companies typically prohibit third parties from stringing attachments to utility poles and wires, the creation of an eruv has often necessitated obtaining permissions, easements, and exceptions to various local ordinances. Such government requirements have given rise to both political and legal controversy.

=== Demographic changes ===
Jewish people who are not in favor of an eruv may feel that after an eruv is created they live in a symbolically segregated community. "It's like social engineering," said Arnold Sheiffer, founder of the opposition group Jewish People for the Betterment of Westhampton Beach. "We [the Jewish people] fought like hell to get out of the ghetto and now they want to create that again. The opposition in the village here is very, very high."

=== Legal status ===
In the United States, legal controversies about an eruv in a community often focus on provisions of the First Amendment of the Constitution of the United States, which addresses relations between government and religion. Opponents of an eruv typically take the view that the government participation in the process necessary to approve construction of an eruv violates the First Amendment's prohibition of governmental establishment of religion. Proponents take the view that it constitutes a constitutionally permissible accommodation of religion rather than an establishment. Proponents have also argued that the Free Exercise Clause affirmatively requires government acceptance, on the grounds that government interference with or failure to accommodate an eruv constitutes discrimination against or inhibition of the constitutional right of free exercise of religion.

In the 2002 decision on Tenafly Eruv Association v. Borough of Tenafly, Judge Ambro, writing for the United States Third Circuit Court of Appeals, held that Eruv Association members had no intrinsic right to add attachments to telephone poles on Borough property and that the borough, if it wished, could enact a general, neutral ordinance against all attachments to utility poles that could be enforced against the eruv. However, Judge Ambro held that in this case, the Borough had not enacted a genuinely general or neutral ordinance because it permitted a wide variety of attachments to utility poles for non-religious purposes, including posting signs and other items. Because it permitted attachments to utility poles for secular purposes, the court held, it could not selectively exclude attachments for religious purposes. The United States Supreme Court declined to hear the case. It was subsequently cited as precedent by a number of other federal courts deciding disputes between an eruv association and a local government.

In Outremont, Quebec, a neighbourhood in Montreal, Canada, the city adopted a policy of removing eruv wires. In 2001, the Hasidic community obtained an injunction preventing such action by city authorities.

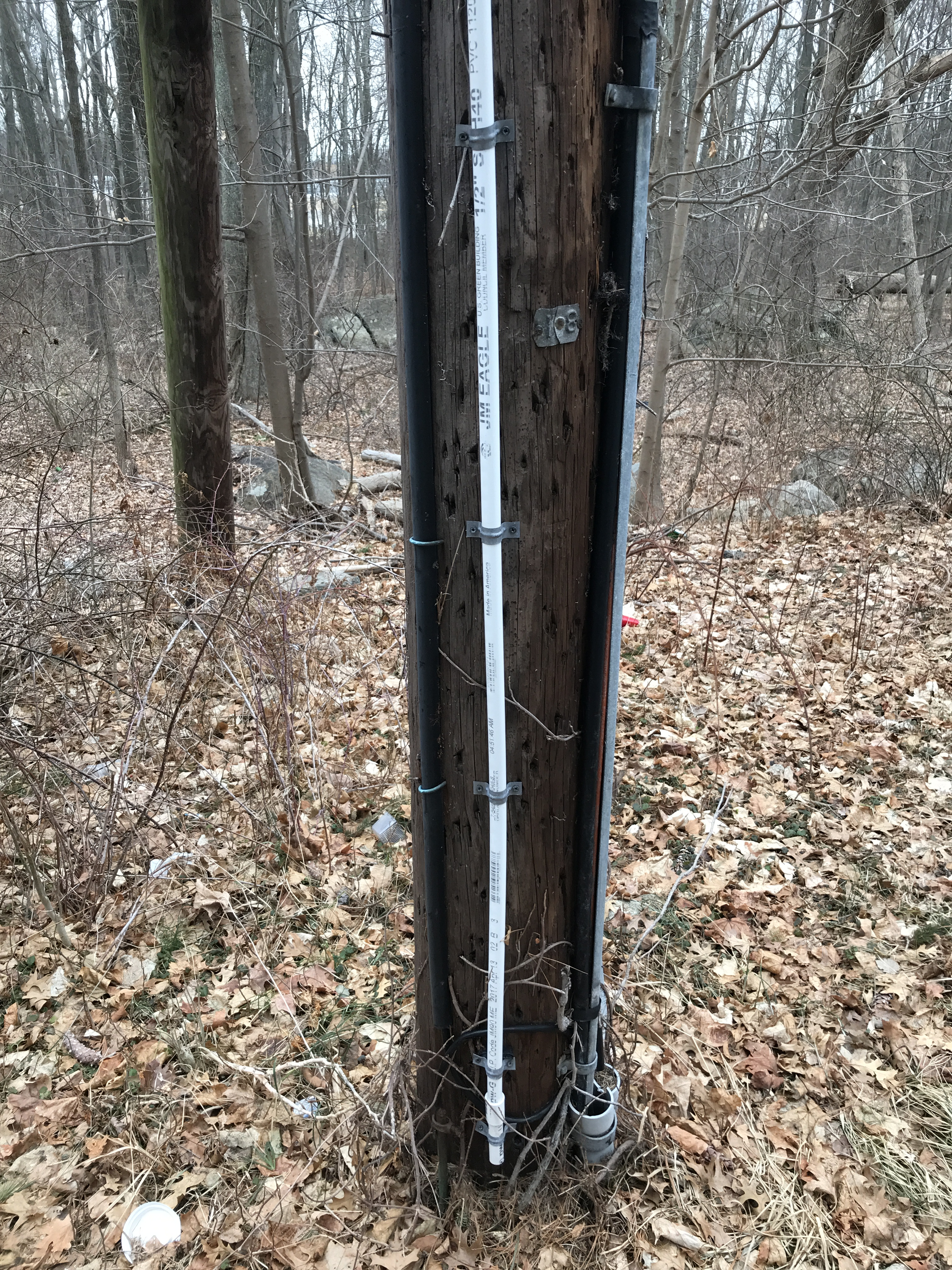
Original white PVC pipe, attached to a utility pole in Mahwah, New Jersey, serving as a lechi to demarcate an eruv

Between 2015 and 2018, there were ongoing issues with eruv markings extended on utility poles in a section of Bergen County, New Jersey. The adjoining municipalities of Mahwah, Upper Saddle River and Montvale, all border the state line on the other side of which is Rockland County, New York, where there are large communities of Orthodox Jews. After some eruvin were extended into Bergen County, allowing travel in the area, the municipalities took action in 2017 to dismantle the lechi markings. The matter was taken to court, and in January 2018 the presiding judge in the lawsuits made it clear he felt the municipalities did not have a strong case, and urged them to settle. The three municipalities settled with the eruv association, allowing the eruv borders to remain in New Jersey, reimbursed the association's legal fees, received agreement from the association to adjust the color of the lechi mounted on local utility poles, and agreed to work through a few remaining route details.

In general, state law has dealt with whether and to what extent government can permit or assist the erection and maintenance of boundary demarcations on public property. It has not dealt with the nature of the aggregation agreement or recognized an eruv as having legal effect or as implementing a meaningful change in real property ownership or tenancy. For purposes of accident liability, trespass, insurance, and other secular matters occurring on Shabbat, state law treats the properties within an eruv as continuing to be separate parcels.

== Other forms of eruv ==
The term eruv is also used to refer to other, unrelated concepts in halakha. These include the eruv techumin which enables one to travel beyond the normal travel restrictions on Shabbat or holidays, and the eruv tavshilin which enables one to cook for Shabbat on a holiday which immediately precedes that Shabbat.

=== Eruv techumin ===
An eruv techumin (Hebrew: עירוב תחומין, lit. 'mixing of borders') for traveling enables a traditionally observant Jew to travel by foot on Shabbat or a Jewish holiday beyond the 2,000-cubit (one biblical mile) limit imposed by rabbinic restriction.

=== Eruv tavshilin ===
An eruv tavshilin (Hebrew: עירוב תבשילין, lit. 'mixed cooked food items') is made in the home on the eve of a holiday with a work prohibition, if the holiday happens to fall on Friday. Since food cannot be cooked on Shabbat, the only way to eat freshly cooked food on Shabbat is to cook it on Friday, which in this case is a holiday. The eruv tavshilin allows this cooking to be done in a way that does not violate the holiday work restrictions.
