= Techum shabbat =

Physical area where Jews are permitted to walk during the Shabbat

In Jewish halacha, the techum shabbat (Hebrew: תחום שבת, "Shabbat limit"), or simply techum, is a limited physical area in which a Jew is permitted to travel on Shabbat and Jewish holidays. In general, this area is calculated by measuring 2000 cubits (about 1 kilometer) in every direction from the place (or settlement) where a person was located when Shabbat began.

One may extend this limit for an additional 2000 cubits in one direction, using a procedure known as eruv techumin.

== Sources ==
The source of the prohibition is the verse in Exodus in which Moses commands the Israelites not to leave their encampment to gather manna on Shabbat:

"Behold, the Lord has given you the sabbath, therefore He gives you on the sixth day bread for two days; each man shall stay put, and not leave his place on the seventh day" (Exodus 16:29).

According to the Babylonian Talmud, the current prohibition is of rabbinic origin, and this verse is only an asmachta (hint) to a rabbinic law, rather than the source of a Biblical law. However, the Jerusalem Talmud states that while the prohibition to venture further than 2000 cubits (one mil) is rabbinic, venturing a distance over 12 mil is Biblically forbidden. Maimonides rules according to the Jerusalem Talmud, while others rule according to the Babylonian Talmud.

Taking Israel's encampment in the wilderness as a prototypical model, some rabbis view one's "place" as initially being within the radius of 12 biblical miles, corresponding to the encampment of the Israelites when they pitched their tents from Beth-yeshimoth as far as Abel-shittim. During Israel's encampment, it was permissible to walk the entire length and width of the camp on the Sabbath day. Later, by the conflation of multiple biblical passages which employ in them the words "place" (Exodus 21:12), "border" (Numbers 35:26), and "two-thousand cubits" (Numbers 35:5), the Sages found the basis on which to limit the movement of the people of a town on the Sabbath day to 2,000 cubits, a boundary that would extend in any of the four cardinal directions, and which is measured from the last house built in the town's periphery. In ancient times, roads leading from the town were usually marked with rock cairns at the Sabbath limit, to aid travelers on the roads.

Targum Pseudo-Jonathan to Exodus 16:29 ("...Let every man abide in his place; let no man go out of his place on the seventh day") interprets the verse as follows: "...Let a man abide in his place, and do not carry any object from one domain to another domain beyond four cubits, neither let a man depart out of his place to venture beyond two-thousand cubits on the Sabbath day."

== The starting point for measurement ==
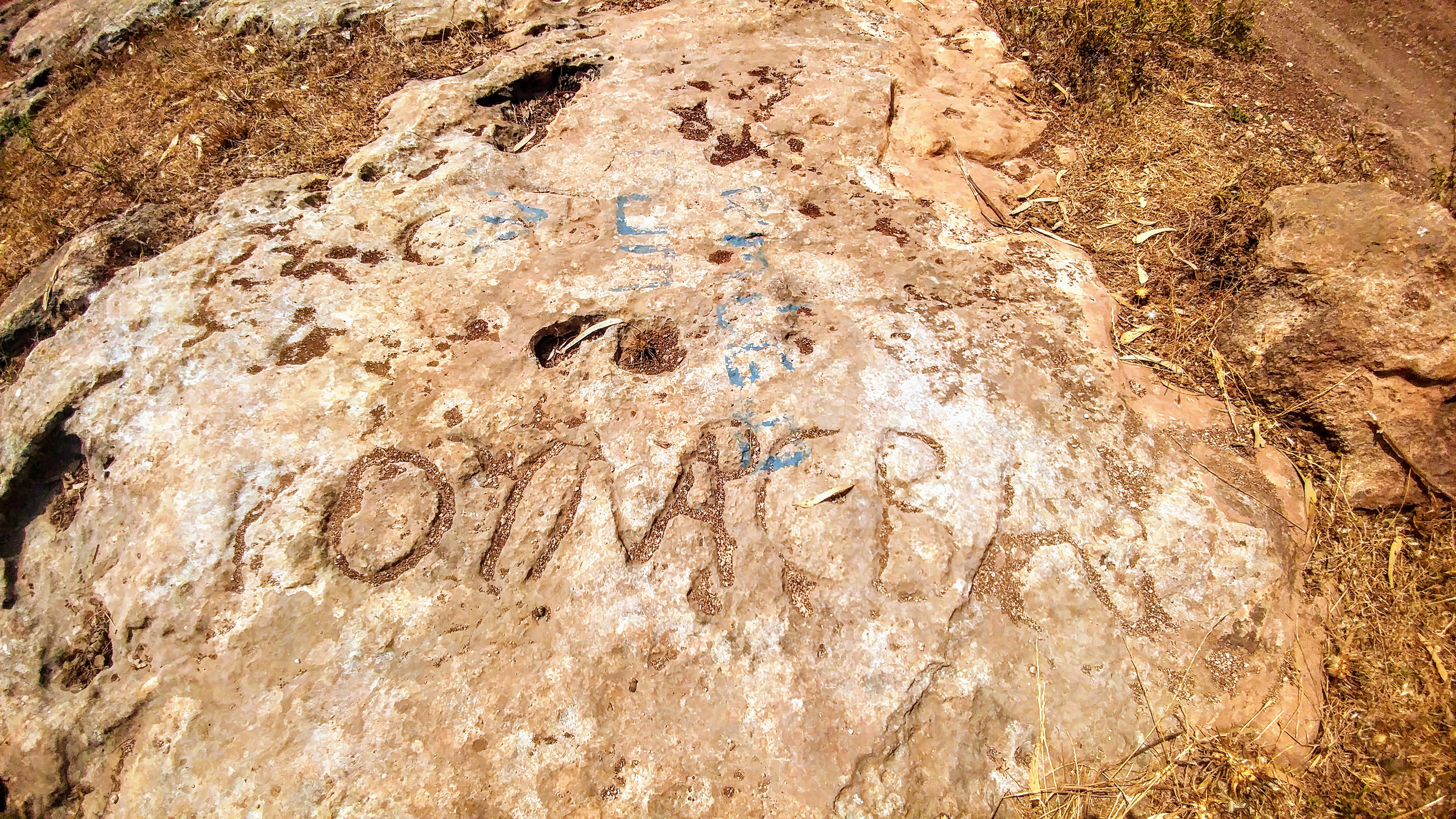
Stone indicating the Techum Shabbat discovered at Usha

A person who is located in an open area outside human settlement, measures 2000 cubits outside the "four cubits" surrounding him which are considered his personal space. If a person is located in an isolated house which is not part of a larger settlement, the techum is measured from outside the courtyard of his house. If he is within a settlement, the entire area of the settlement is considered his personal space.

A person need not say or intend anything particular for this normal techum to take effect. However, he may declare that his "dwelling place" is located in a different place from his location at the entrance of Shabbat (on condition that the place he is physically located is within the techum for the place he has declared). For example: if a person is located just outside a city, he may declare that his dwelling place is within the city.

When this declaration is made in error, it is not valid. Therefore, a person who does not realize before Shabbat that he is adjacent to a city, and discovers this fact during Shabbat, may then enter the city and calculate his techum according to the city's techum. However, if he was aware of the city before Shabbat and knowingly chose his "dwelling place" to be based on his location outside the city, his techum remains as he intended, and if parts of the city are outside his 2000-cubit zone, he may not enter those parts.

== Determining the limit ==
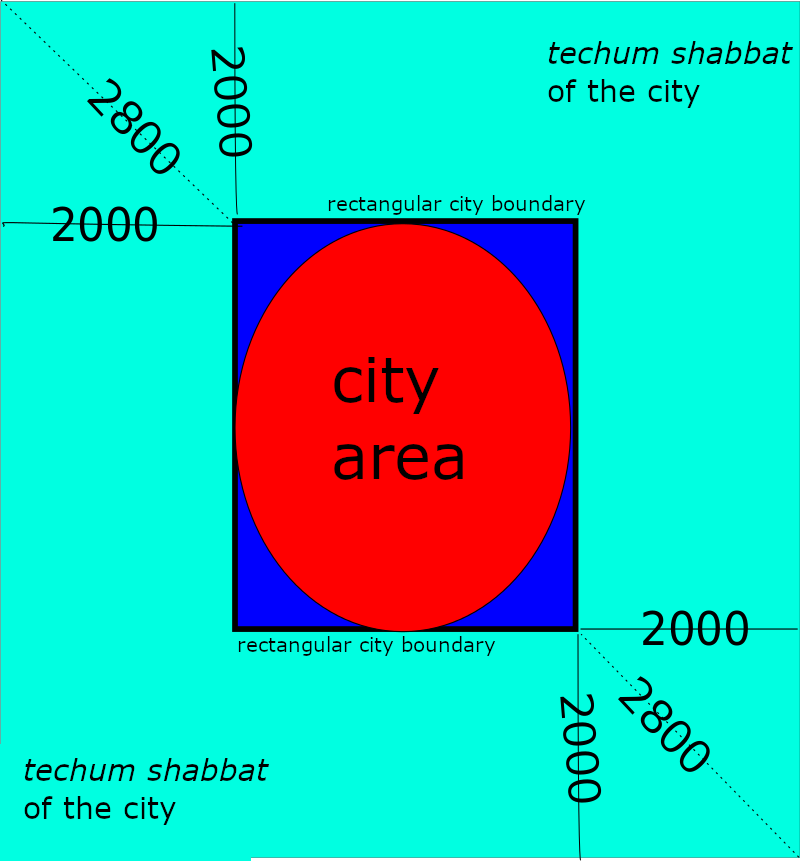
An example of city measurement for techum. Red: built-up city area (can be any shape). Dark blue: rectangle encompassing the city. Cyan: the further 2000 cubits in which walking is permitted. Note that 2800 is merely an estimate for 2000√2.

To calculate the techum for a city, it is first necessary to determine the city boundary from which the 2000 cubits are to be measured. A city may be of any shape, but the boundary used for this purpose is always a rectangle - the smallest rectangle which can contain the entire city. If the city is rectangular or close to rectangular in shape, the rectangle used for measurement will follow the edges of the city. If the city has an irregular shape, the rectangle follows the cardinal directions. The measurement of 2000 cubits for a city's techum begins at the edge of this rectangle. However, if a city has a concave shape and the "edges" of the concave hollow are more than 4000 cubits apart, parts of the hollow located more than 2000 cubits from the city are not included in the techum rectangle.

Any house which is found within a distance of 70 cubits (~35 meters) from the city is considered part of the city. If a second house is located less than 70 cubits from the first house, then it too is considered part of the city. By this principle, a "city" can extend over a large area even if its buildings are quite distant from one another. This is on condition that the buildings are used for dwelling, not for storage or other purposes. Of course, the rectangle enclosing the city will include even more space.

Two cities which have less than 141 cubits of open space between them are considered to be one city for the purposes of calculating techum.

When a group of nomadic people live in temporary buildings such as tents, their encampment is not considered a single settlement, and each individual measures 2000 cubits from his own dwelling. But if they built a fixed common structure such as a fence, they do count as a single settlement.

Since the travel limit is rectangular, one may travel 2,000 cubits parallel to the side of the rectangle, or about 2,800 cubits diagonally.

This summary of the laws is simplified and incomplete, and more details apply in practice.

== Other laws ==
Rabbi Yehudai Gaon and R. Achai Gaon explain the verse (ibid.), "let every man abide in his place," as meaning that if he were uprooted from his place beyond the 2,000 cubits' Sabbath limit, either by a gentile or by an evil spirit, he is not permitted to move beyond four cubits of that place until the Sabbath has departed. Of these four cubits, R. Meir said that three cubits are for his body, and another cubit for him to stretch out his arms and his legs, while R. Yehuda says three cubits are for his body, and another cubit for him to retrieve an object from beneath his head and to place it beneath his feet, or vice versa.

It is prohibited to go out to the "Sabbath limit" and wait there until nightfall (until the Sabbath departs) in order to perform some labor there immediately after Shabbat, as this preparation violates a separate prohibition, of pursuing business affairs on Shabbat (Isaiah 58:13). However, if one's animal had strayed beyond the limit, he may stand at the "Sabbath limit" and call out to the animal, causing it to return on its own power.

== See also ==
- Eruv techumin
- Biblical mile
