= Eruvin (Talmud) =

Talmudic tractate about Sabbath boundaries

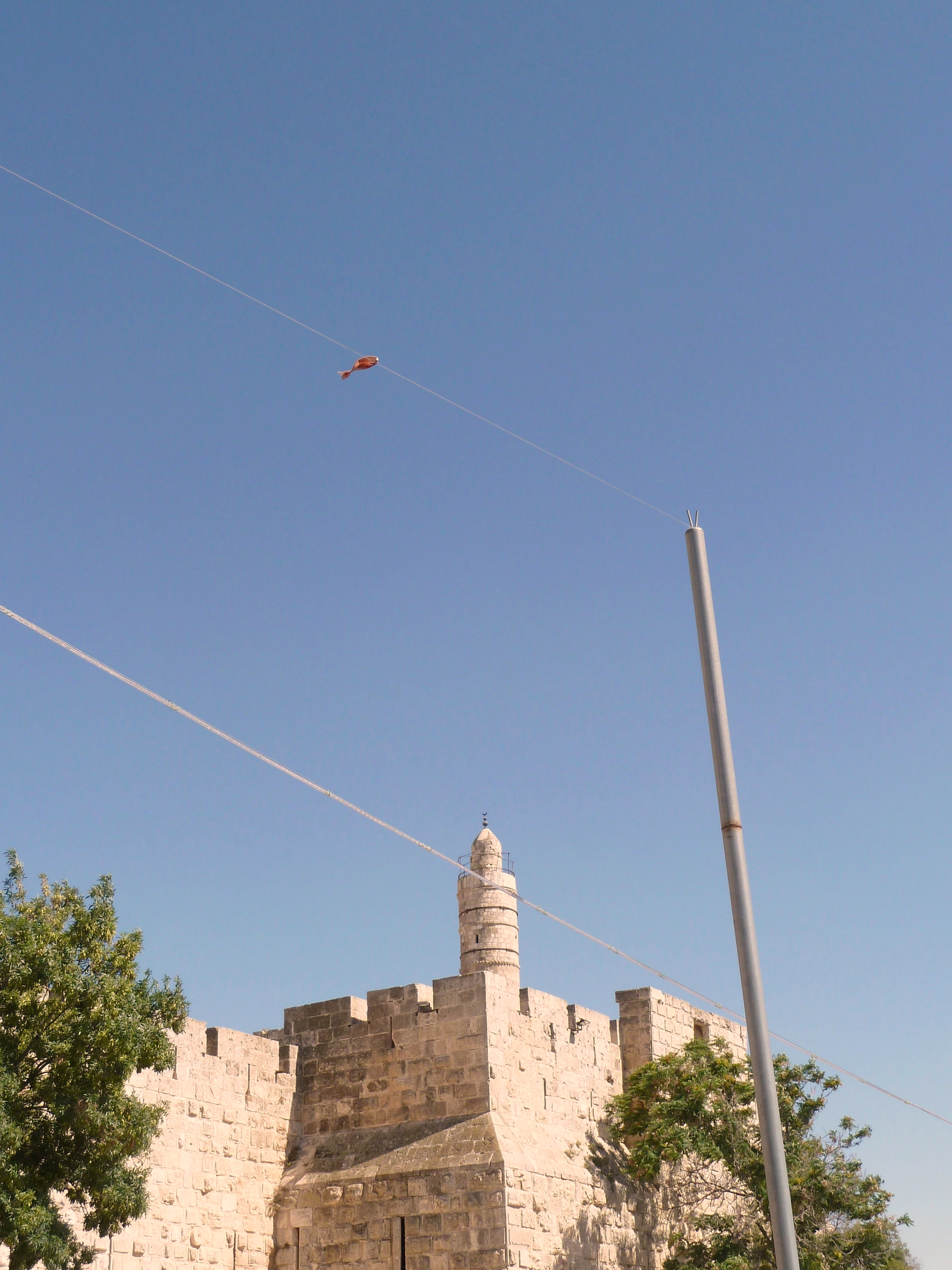
- Eruv outside the Old City of Jerusalem

Tractate of the Talmud
- Seder: Moed
- Number of mishnahs: 96
- Chapters: 10
- Babylonian Talmud pages: 104
- Jerusalem Talmud pages: 65
- Tosefta chapters: 8

Eruvin (Hebrew: עֵרוּבִין, lit. 'Mixtures') is the second tractate in the Order of Moed in the Talmud, dealing with the various types of eruv. In this sense this tractate is a natural extension of Shabbat; at one point these tractates were likely joined but then split due to length.

The Ra'ya Mehemna (14th century) introduced ענ״י as an acronym for "Eruvin, Niddah, and Yevamot". According to Jacob Emden, עני destitute is a pun which references the reputed difficulty of these tractates, and the acronym serves to warn off students. Eliezer Sofer uses it for "Eruvin, Nazir, Yevamot", arguing that Nazir is more difficult, and some also use "Eruvin, Nedarim, Yevamot".

== Structure ==
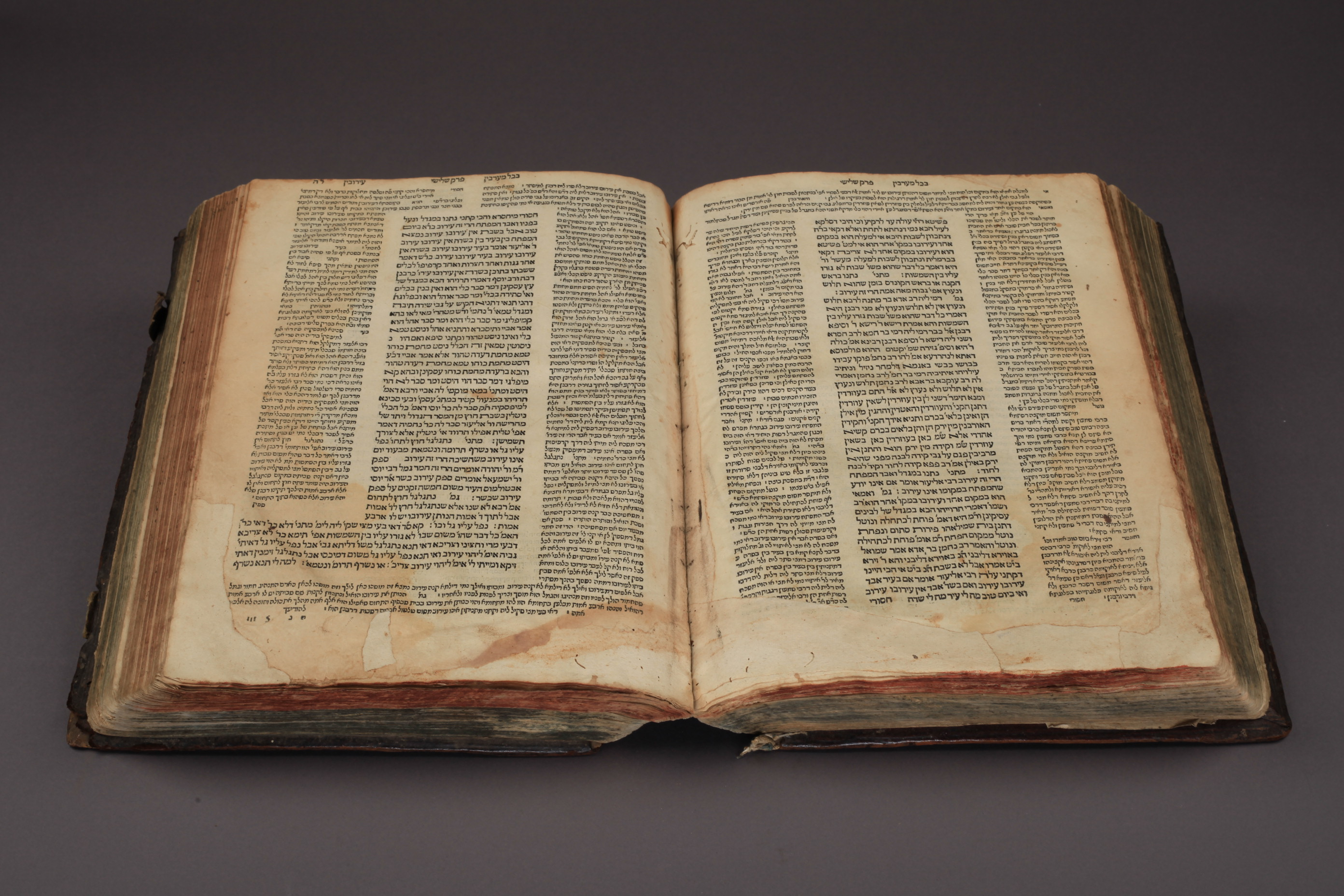
A volume from the earliest printings of the Talmud, open to Tractate Eruvin, pages 34b and 35a

The tractate consists of ten chapters with a total of 96 mishnayot. Its Babylonian Talmud version is of 105 pages and its Jerusalem Talmud version is of 65 pages.

An overview of the content of chapters is as follows:

- Chapter 1 (Hebrew: מָבוֹי, romanized: Mavoi, lit. 'Entrance') has ten mishnayot.
- Chapter 2 (Hebrew: עוֹשִׂין פַּסִּין, romanized: Osin Pasin, lit. 'Arranging Boards') has six mishnayot.
- Chapter 3 (Hebrew: בַּכֹּל מְעָרְבִין, romanized: Bakol Me'Arevin, lit. 'With all kinds... of mixtures') has nine mishnayot.
- Chapter 4 (Hebrew: מִי שֶׁהוֹצִיאוּהוּ, romanized: Mi Shehotzi'uhu, lit. 'Whoever took them out') has eleven mishnayot.
- Chapter 5 (Hebrew: כֵּיצַד מְעַבְּרִין, romanized: Ketzad M'abrin, lit. 'How to extend') has nine mishnayot.
- Chapter 6 (Hebrew: הַדָּר, romanized: Hadar) has ten mishnayot.
- Chapter 7 (Hebrew: חָלוֹן, romanized: Halon, lit. 'Window') has eleven mishnayot.
- Chapter 8 (Hebrew: כֵּיצַד מִשְׁתַּתְּפִין, romanized: Ketzad Mishtatefin, lit. 'How one participates') has eleven mishnayot.
- Chapter 9 (Hebrew: כָּל גָּגּוֹת, romanized: Kol Gagot, lit. 'All roofs') has four mishnayot.
- Chapter 10 (Hebrew: הַמּוֹצֵא תְּפִילִּין, romanized: Hamotzi Tefillin, lit. 'One who finds tefillin') has fifteen mishnayot.

== Main subjects ==
=== Eruv Chatzeirot ===
An eruv ([ʔeˈʁuv]; Hebrew: עירוב, "mixture"), also transliterated as eiruv or erub, plural: eruvin [ʔeʁuˈvin]) is a ritual enclosure that permits Jewish residents or visitors to carry certain objects outside their own homes on Sabbath and Yom Kippur (the Day of Atonement). An eruv accomplishes this by integrating a number of private and public properties into one larger private domain, thereby countermanding restrictions on carrying objects from the private to the public domain on Sabbath and holidays.

The eruv allows these religious Jews to, among other things, carry house keys, tissues, medicines, or babies with them, and use strollers and canes. Orthodox Judaism prohibits motorized transportation on Shabbat and holidays, although the presence of an eruv for carrying permits certain types of non-motorized transport such as strollers and wheelchairs. The presence or absence of an eruv thus especially affects the lives of people with limited mobility and those responsible for taking care of babies and young children.

=== Eruv techumin ===
An eruv techumin (Hebrew: עירוב תחומין "mixed borders") for traveling enables a traditionally observant Jew to travel on Shabbat or a Jewish holiday. The Jew prepares food prior to Shabbat or a holiday at a location to which they plan to travel that is farther than is normally allowed on such days.

=== Eruv tavshilin ===
An eruv tavshilin (Hebrew: עירוב תבשילין "mixed cooked food items") is made in the home on the eve of a holiday with a work proscription that directly precedes the Sabbath. It is made by taking a cooked item and a baked item, and placing them together. It is common to use a piece of cooked egg, fish, or meat as the cooked item and a piece of bread or matzah as the baked item. It is needed because while it is allowed to cook and transfer fire on holidays (unlike the Sabbath and Yom Kippur, when these activities are forbidden), these activities are allowed to be done for use on only the holiday, and not for the next day. The eruv tavshilin makes it possible to begin preparing for the Sabbath before the holiday, and continue doing so. The foods of the eruv tavshilin are traditionally eaten on the Sabbath day following the holiday.
