= Biblical mile =

Unit of distance

Biblical mile (Hebrew: מיל, romanized: mīl) is a unit of distance on land, or linear measure, principally used by Jews during the Herodian dynasty to ascertain distances between cities and to mark the Sabbath limit, equivalent to about two-thirds of an English statute mile, or what was about four furlongs (four stadia). The basic Jewish traditional unit of distance was the cubit (Hebrew: אמה), each cubit being roughly between 46–60 centimetres (18–24 in) The standard measurement of the biblical mile, or what is sometimes called Techum shabbat (Sabbath limit; Sabbath boundary), was 2,000 cubits.

== Etymology ==
The word mīl, as used in Hebrew texts between the 2nd and 5th centuries CE, is a Roman loanword, believed to be a shortened adaptation of the Latin mīliarium, literally meaning, "milestone," and which word signifies "a thousand" [passuum <paces> of two steps each]; hence: Roman mile. The word appears in the Mishnah, a compendium of Jewish oral law compiled by Rabbi Judah the Prince in 189 CE, and is used to this very day by religious Jews in the application of certain halachic laws.

== Halachic applications ==
- On Shabbat, one is not allowed to travel further than 1 biblical mile outside one's city; this law is known as techum shabbat. A procedure known as eruv techumin allows one to travel up to one more biblical mile.
- The rabbinic ordinance of washing hands prior to eating bread requires of people travelling the roads to go as far as 4 biblical miles if there is a known water source that can be used for washing. This applies only to when the water source lies in one's general direction of travel. However, had he already passed the water source, he is not obligated to backtrack unless the distance is within 1 biblical mile.
- Sliced pieces of meat that are to be cooked in a pot require salting before they are cooked. The first process is rinsing in water followed by salting with any coarse salt, while laid over a grating or colander to allow for drainage. The salt is allowed to remain on the meat for the time that it takes to walk one biblical mile (appx. 18– 24 minutes). Afterwards, the residue of salt is rinsed away with water, and the meat cooked. Salting in this way helps to draw out the blood.

== Divergent methods ==
Nearly two thousand years of Jewish exile from the Land of Israel have given rise to disputes over the precise length of the biblical mile observed by the ancients. Some hold the biblical mile to be 1,152 m, while others hold it to be 960 m, depending on the length they prescribe to each cubit. Originally, the 2,000 cubit Sabbath limit was measured with a standard 50-cubit rope.

Another dispute is the actual time it takes for an average man to walk a biblical mile. Most authorities hold that a biblical mile can be traversed in 18 minutes; four biblical miles in 72 minutes. Elsewhere, however, Maimonides held the view that an average man walks a biblical mile in about 20 to 24 minutes.

Divergent methods espoused by the Rabbis
Scholar	Cubit	Biblical mile
Avraham Chaim Naeh	48 centimetres (19 in)	960 metres (3,150 ft)
Chazon-Ish	57.6 centimetres (22.7 in)	1,152 metres (3,780 ft)
Ḏerāʿ (Egyptian cubit)	52.9 or 52.3 cm	1,058 metres (3,471 ft)

== Distances between cities ==
- Hamath to Tiberias = 1 mil (before the two cities converged as one)
- Beit Maon to Tiberias = 1 mil (before the two cities converged as one)
- Migdal Nunia ('the Fish Tower') to Tiberias = 1 mil
- Migdal to Hamath = 1 mil
- Sepphoris to Tiberias = 18 mil
- Lod (Lydda) to Ono = 3 mil
- Beth-jeshimoth to Abel-shittim = 12 mil
- Zoar to Sodom = 5 mil.
- Modiin (Modiith) to Jerusalem = 15 mil.

== See also ==
- Eruv techumin
- Techum shabbat
- Day's journey
