= Eruv techumin =

Jewish religious stricture allowing travel on the Shabbat

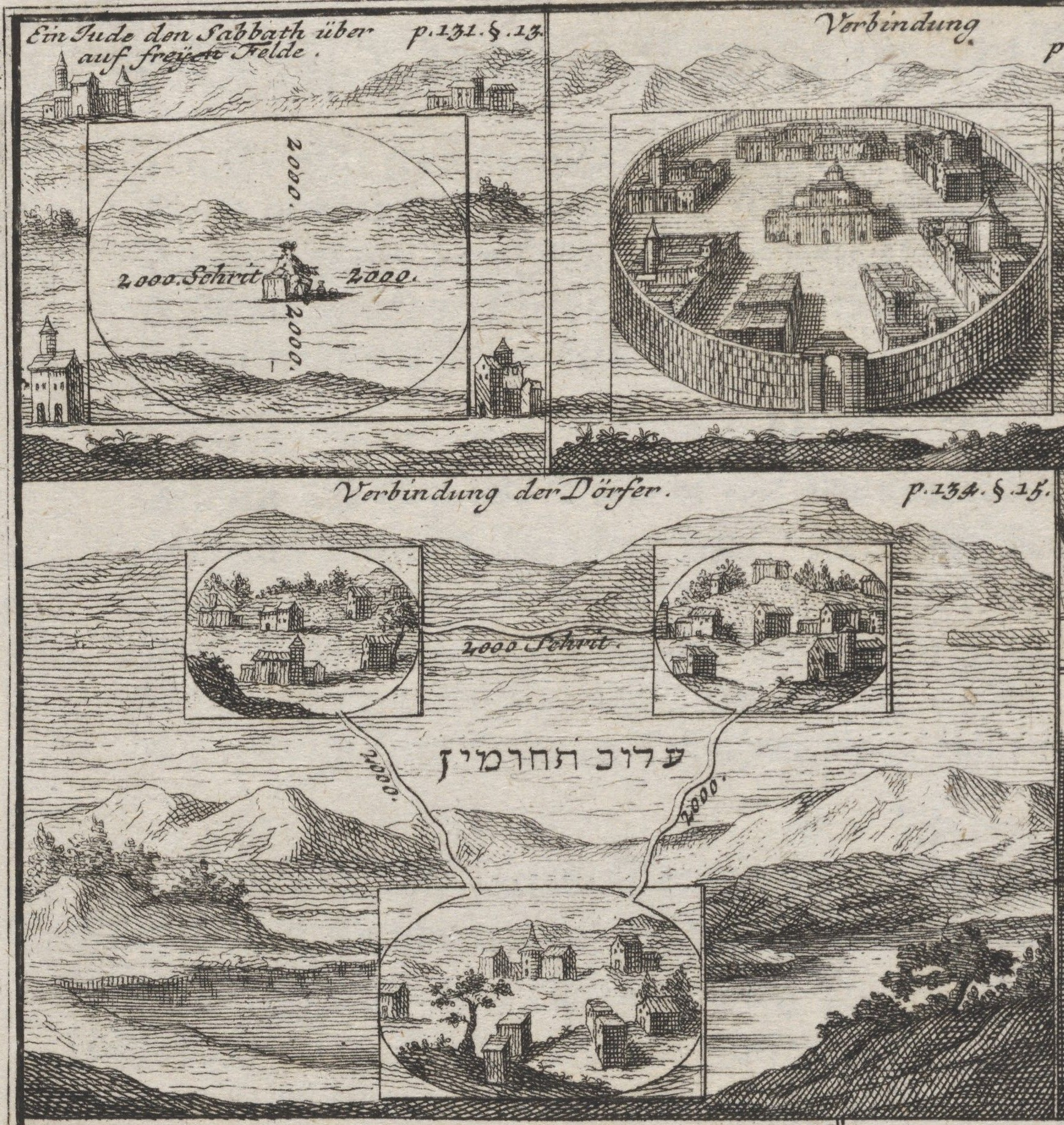
Engraving by Gottfried Eichler (1748)

An eruv techumin (Hebrew: עירוב תחומין, "mixed borders") for traveling enables Jews to travel on Shabbat or a Jewish holiday, without violating the prohibition of techum shabbat. They prepare food prior to Shabbat or the holiday on which they plan to travel farther than is normally allowed on such days. The only allowed method of transportation is walking.

Normally, a person may walk anywhere in their city or town on such days, but only within that area and up to 2000 cubits past the city limits (the city limits are defined to extend so long as there are houses within 70 cubits of the each other; see techum shabbat for details). If they need to travel farther than that, they can leave some food in a certain location prior to that holiday or Sabbath. This will temporarily establish their home as at the location of the food, allowing to travel 2000 cubits from the food. The food must be enough for two Sabbath meals. They would also declare there, "Let my cessation of labor (Heb. shǝvitathi) be in this place." For the eruv techumin to be effective, the food must be prepared by day (before the Sabbath) and be still in existence when Sabbath commences. Even so, this was a special allowance, and was only permitted in order to perform a mitzvah or avoid a danger. Since the Sabbath day limit of 2,000 cubits was a rabbinic ordinance, the Rabbis had the power to exercise leniency in what concerns its proper observance.

It is rare for contemporary Jews living in cities to need the eruv techumin to avoid violating the techum shabbat, as the techum shabbat automatically extends to cover all of an urban area.

== See also ==
- Biblical mile
- Techum shabbat
