= HaMasrek Reserve =

Israeli nature reserve

- שְׁמוּרַת הַמַּסְרֵק
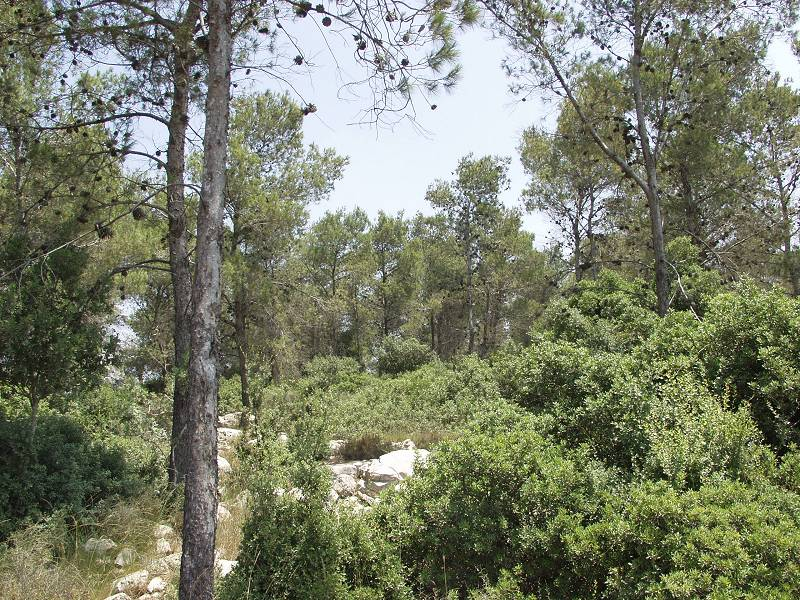
- Local landscape in HaMasrek Reserve

- Location within Israel
- Location: Jerusalem Mountains, Israel
- Coordinates: 31°47′41″N 35°02′30″E

HaMasrek Reserve (Hebrew: שְׁמוּרַת הַמַּסְרֵק) is a nature reserve situated in the western Jerusalem Mountains, Israel, near moshav Beit Meir.

HaMasrek Reserve is renowned and named for its prominent stand of Jerusalem pine trees, which are approximately 170 years old. It features several scenic viewpoints which offer panoramic views encompassing the coastal plain stretching from Netanya to Ashkelon, the Ayalon Valley, and the historic Burma Road. Additionally, they provide vistas of the southwestern Samarian mountains including the Gophna and Bethel ridges, as well as the upper and central basin of the adjacent Kesalon Stream.

HaMasrek Reserve offers walking paths, parking facilities, rest areas for relaxation, and drinking fountains for refreshment. Notably, camping and picnicking activities are restricted within the reserve to preserve its natural environment. For those wishing to visit the HaMasrek Reserve, access is facilitated by traveling along Road No. 3955, which leads from Shoava Crossing to Beit Meir.

== Name ==
The reserve derives its name from the existence of an old Jerusalem pine grove. During the 1948 Palestine War, this pine grove stood out prominently amidst the surrounding stark, vegetation-scarce rugged ridges, resembling the teeth of a comb. This distinctive feature that led Palmach fighters to nickname the location "HaMasrek", Hebrew: מַּסְרֵק, lit. 'the comb', a name that later became the official designation for this place.

== Flora ==
HaMasrek Reserve exhibits two primary vegetation types. At the summit and its periphery, the presence of a unique soil formation known as the Beit Meir formation provides an optimal habitat for the proliferation of Jerusalem pine trees, the dominant arboreal species in the local ecosystem. Accompanying these pines are Greek strawberry trees and shrubs such as spiny brooms, pink rock-roses, sage-leaved rock-roses, and Greek sages. Notably, some of the larger pine trees may host galls, which give rise to a natural phenomenon known as "the witch's broom."

On the mountain's slopes, the prevailing geological feature consists of limestone rock, characteristic of the central Judaean Mountains. This geological foundation yields terra rossa soil, which provides a hospitable environment for kermes oaks and Pistacia trees (including Pistacia palaestina and Pistacia lentiscus).

In the open spaces and amidst the shrubbery within the reserve, a diverse array of wildflowers blossoms during the winter and spring seasons. Among these blooms are Cyclamen persicum, Anemone coronaria, Ranunculus asiaticus, and Helichrysum sanguineum, as well as orchids such as Limodorum abortivum and Ophrys holosericea.

== Historical remains ==
=== A-Sheikh Ahmed al-Ajami ===
At the summit of the mountain, a notable clearing can be found, within which is situated the Muslim tomb-shrine of a-Sheikh Ahmed al-Ajami, a local Muslim saint once venerated by the neighboring depopulated Arab village of Bayt Mahsir. According to local tradition, Sheikh Ahmed al-Ajami was one of the companions of the Prophet Muhammad and held the esteemed position of serving as the Prophet's barber. The preservation of the surrounding forest is attributed to the sanctity of this location.

Presently, the structure housing the tomb is in a precarious condition and at risk of collapsing. For safety reasons, access to the structure is strictly prohibited to prevent any potential harm to visitors.
