= Baruch Sheptarani =

Baruch Sheptarani (Hebrew: ברוך שפטרני) It is a blessing (Berakhah) used by Jews that the boy's father blesses when his son reaches the age of thirteen (bar mitzvah). The blessing is greeted by Jews immediately after the boy made Aliyah.

The first source for this blessing is in Midrash Rabbah on Parshas Toldot. On the verse "And the boys grew up and there was Esau a man who knew a hunter a man of a field and Jacob a man of innocence sat a tent", On this the Midrash says "Rabbi Phinehas in the name of Rabbi Levy: "A parable of the myrtle and thorn plant that grew one on top of the other. When they grew and blossomed, one gave forth its fragrance, while the other gave forth its thorns. So too, the whole thirteen years Jacob and Esau each went to school and each returned from school. After 13 years one would go to "Beit Midrash" (halls of study) and the other would go to houses of Idolatry. Rabbi Elazar said in the name of Rabbi Shimon: A man must care for his son for 13 years, but from that point on he must say: Blessed be God who released me from the punishment of [due to] this boy"

== Text of Baruch Sheptarani ==
| English translation | Transliteration | Aramaic / Hebrew |
|---|---|---|
| Blessed are You, LORD our God, King of the universe, for relieving me of his punishment | Baruch ata adonay e'loheynu melech ha'olam sheptarani me'onsho shel ze | בָּרוּךְ (אַתָּה ה' אֱלֹהֵינוּ מֶלֶךְ הָעוֹלָם) שֶׁפְּטָרַנִי מֵעָנְשׁוֹ שֶל זֶה |

== The blessing today ==
In Shulchan Aruch the existence of this blessing was not mentioned at all, but the Rama wrote: Some say that he whose son has become a "bar mitzvah" will bless "Blessed are you, O Lord our God, the King of the world who has released me from the punishment of this."

But the Rema objected and added "but it is good to bless without Shem U Malchut.

Rabbi Yechiel Michel Epstein in his book Aruch Hashulchan wrote: "and many used to bless with Shem U Malchut when the bar mitzvah boy made Aliyah Latora."
