= Torah Temimah (disambiguation) =

Torah Temimah may refer to:

- Torah Temimah Primary School
- Yeshiva Torah Temimah
- Torah Temimah, a commentary on the Pentateuch (Torah) written by Rabbi Baruch Epstein
