= Naftali Zvi Yehuda Berlin =

Russian Orthodox rabbi (1816–1893)

Rabbi Naftali Zvi Yehuda Berlin
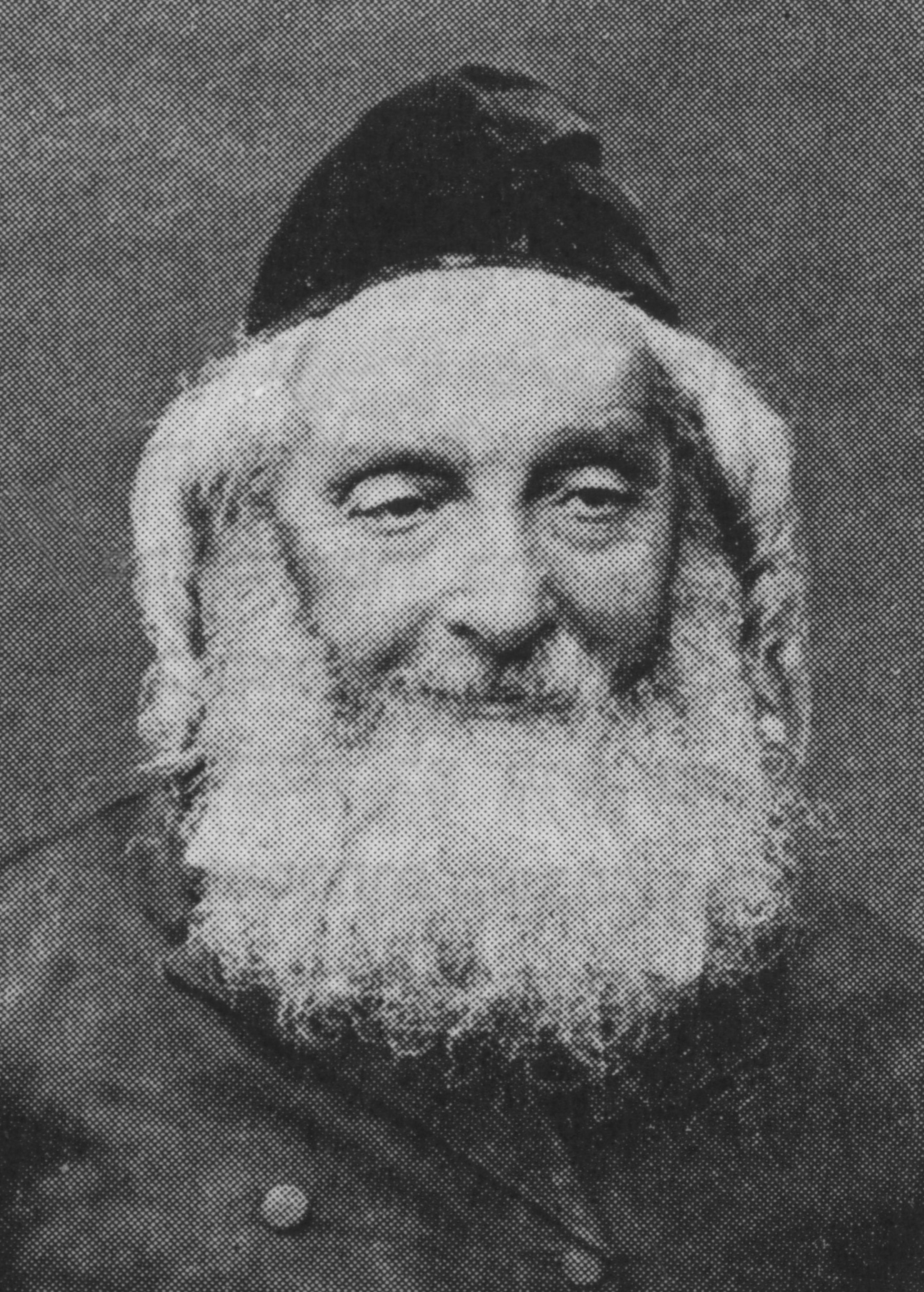
- Title: Rabbi

Personal life
- Born: November 20, 1816 Mir, Russian Empire
- Died: August 10, 1893 (aged 76) Warsaw, Russian Empire
- Buried: Jewish Cemetery, Warsaw
- Children: Chaim Berlin, Meir Bar-Ilan

Religious life
- Religion: Judaism
- Denomination: Orthodox Judaism

Jewish leader
- Position: Rosh yeshiva
- Yeshiva: Volozhin Yeshiva
- Yahrtzeit: 28 Av 5653

Naftali Zvi Yehuda Berlin (20 November 1816 – 10 August 1893), also known as Reb Hirsch Leib Berlin, and commonly known by the acronym Netziv, was a Russian Orthodox rabbi, rosh yeshiva (dean) of the Volozhin Yeshiva and author of several works of rabbinic literature in Lithuania.

== Biography ==
=== Early life ===
The Netziv was the eldest son of Yaakov Berlin, a merchant and Torah scholar in the city of Mir, in the Russian Empire (now in Belarus). His paternal lineage traces back to Rabbi Elchanan of Berlin, known as "R' Elchanan Ba'al HaTosafot" due to his profound Torah knowledge, comparable to that of the Tosafists. On his maternal side, his lineage goes back to Rabbi Meir Eisenstadt, author of the responsa "Panim Meirot." Rabbi Sholom Schwadron recounted that in his youth, the Netziv struggled with his studies, and his father considered sending him to learn a trade. In response, the boy cried for a long time until the gates of wisdom were opened for him. Some of the Netziv's family members strongly deny this story, and in another version, his brother-in-law and nephew, Rabbi Baruch Epstein, recounts in his book "Mekor Baruch" that during the period following the Netziv's marriage, there were times when he felt despair and considered entering commerce. However, during this time, he formed scholarly connections with Rabbi David Luria, which greatly encouraged him. Rabbi Luria even gave him a haskamah (approbation) for the first part of his work, "Haamek She'elah," which was published in 1855.

At the age of 11, the Netziv began studying at the Volozhin Yeshiva, and at 13 and a half, he was betrothed to Reina-Batya, the daughter of R' Yitzhak of Volozhin, head of the Volozhin Yeshiva. Upon marriage, the Netziv devoted himself to deep Torah study for about twenty-five years, where he became known for his dedication. The Netziv's son, Rabbi Meir Bar-Ilan, recalls that at first, his father's exceptional greatness was not widely known due to his humility. A correspondence between the Netziv and Rabbi Luria made R' Yitzchak of Volozhin aware of his greatness. From 1847 onward, the Netziv began delivering lectures at the Volozhin Yeshiva.

=== Head of the Volozhin Yeshiva ===
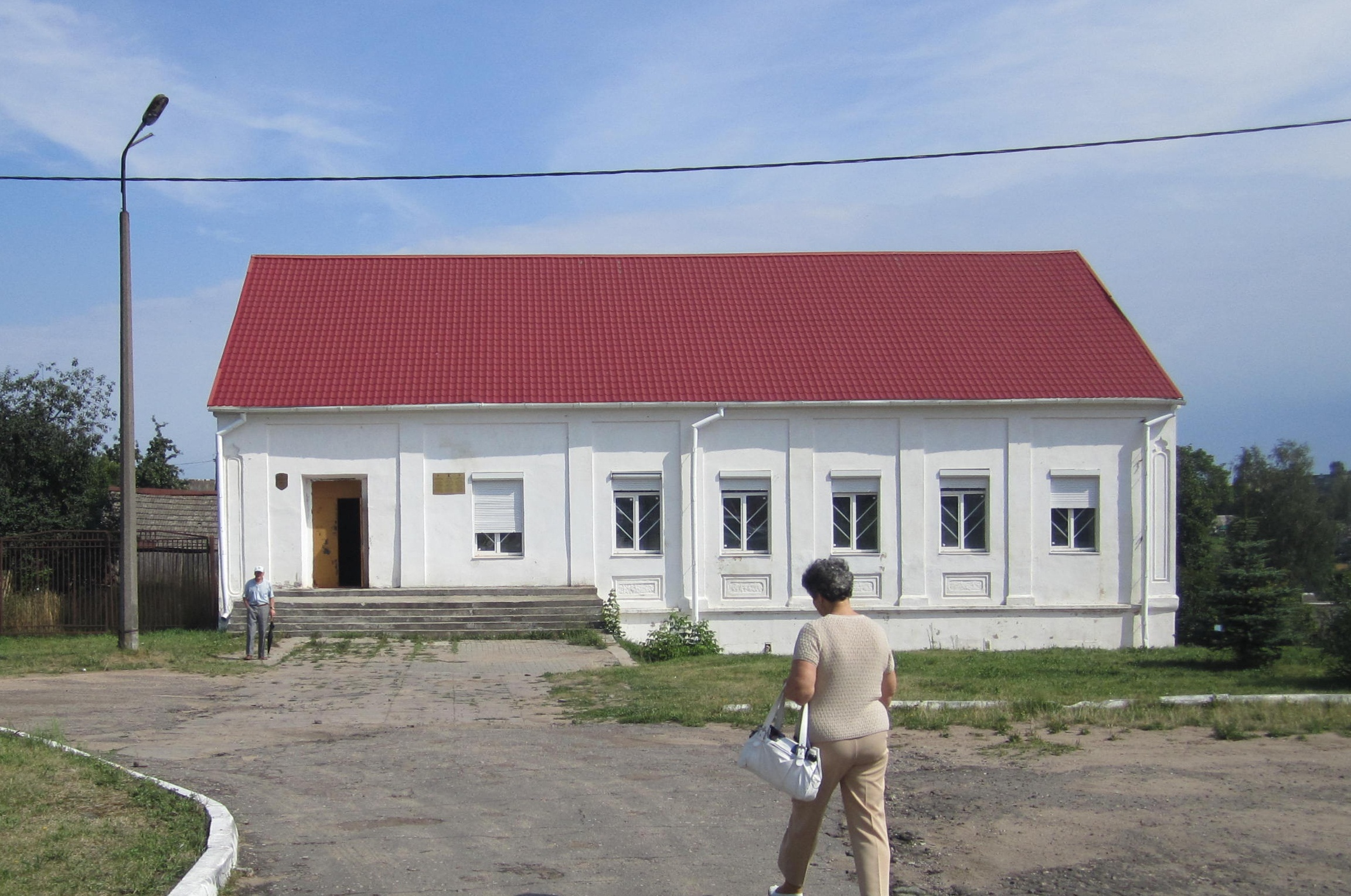
The building of Volozhin Yeshiva today

When his father-in-law died in 1849, his first son-in-law, R' Eliezer Yitzchak, was appointed as the head of the yeshiva, with the Netziv as his deputy. When R' Eliezer Yitzchak died young in 1853, the Netziv was appointed head of the yeshiva, with R' Joseph Dov Ber Soloveitchik as his deputy. The two served together for a time, but there were many disagreements and conflicts between them. The Netziv emphasized mastery and simplicity in study, while R' Joseph Dov preferred dialectical analysis and sharpness in reasoning. Four prominent rabbis of that generation, including R' Yitzchak Elchanan Spektor of Kovno, intervened in the dispute that threatened the yeshiva's existence, ruling in favor of the Netziv, who continued to serve as the primary head of the yeshiva, with R' Joseph Dov as his deputy. The two served in this capacity for twelve years, during which conflicts periodically erupted between the Netziv's students and those of R' Joseph Dov. After twelve years, R' Joseph Dov left to accept a rabbinic position in Brisk, and to prove that his departure was not due to the dispute, he married his son, Rabbi Chaim Soloveitchik, to the Netziv's granddaughter (the daughter of his son-in-law, Rabbi Refael Shapiro).

From 1853 until the yeshiva's closure in 1892, the Netziv led the yeshiva with great dedication, as he wrote:

"In it lies my entire spirit, and I have no one to help me bear its burden."

Under the Netziv's leadership, the yeshiva's reputation grew, and the number of students increased from about 100 to more than 500. The character of the yeshiva was reflected in "The Talmid" written by Chaim Nachman Bialik, who had studied there.

In 1871, the Netziv's wife, Reina-Batya, died. With her he had a son, R' Chaim Berlin. After her death, the Netziv married his niece, Batya Miriam Epstein, daughter of Rabbi Yechiel Michel Epstein (author of the "Aruch HaShulchan"), who was about thirty years younger than him. They had two sons, Rabbi Yaakov and Rabbi Meir Bar-Ilan.

In his later years, the Netziv strongly desired to move to Eretz Yisrael, and he sought to appoint his son, R' Chaim Berlin, the rabbi of Moscow, as his successor. However, some students opposed this and preferred Rabbi Chaim Soloveitchik. This unrest eventually led to an informant reporting the "poor functioning" of the yeshiva to the authorities, which brought about the involvement of the Russian Minister of Education.

The Volozhin Yeshiva was ultimately closed due to the relentless pressure imposed by the Russian authorities on the Netziv. The prevailing narrative is that the Netziv chose to close the yeshiva rather than introduce the teaching of Russian language within its walls. However, he had agreed to allow the teaching of Russian outside the yeshiva, as he wrote:

"If, by royal decree, secular studies must be taught, they should be overseen by a God-fearing teacher."

However, this did not satisfy the Russian Minister of Education, who, in 1891, demanded extensive secular studies from 9 AM to 3 PM, no studies in the evening, no more than ten hours of study per day, and that all yeshiva staff have diplomas. These demands were unacceptable to the Netziv, leading to the closure of the yeshiva.

When the yeshiva was closed in February 1892, the yeshiva's leaders were expelled from the area. The closure, after the Netziv had invested his life into the yeshiva for 38 years, took a toll on his health, as did the concern over the 9,000 ruble debt left behind. His condition worsened to the point of paralysis. His poor health prevented him from fulfilling his dream of moving to Eretz Yisrael. A year and a half later, on the morning of August 10, 1893, he died in Warsaw. He was buried the next day in the Jewish Cemetery in Warsaw. Later, Rabbi Chaim Soloveitchik, the son-in-law of the Netziv's son-in-law, was buried beside him.

His son, R' Chaim Berlin, served as the rabbi of Moscow, and after making aliyah to Eretz Yisrael following his father's death, he became the rabbi of the Perushim community in Jerusalem after the death of R' Shmuel Salant. His other son, Rabbi Meir Bar-Ilan, became a prominent leader in Religious Zionism. The Ein HaNetziv kibbutz in the Beit She'an Valley is named in his honor, with three springs named after him: Ein Naftali, Ein Tzvi, and Ein Yehuda.

== Role in the Chibbat Tzion Movement ==
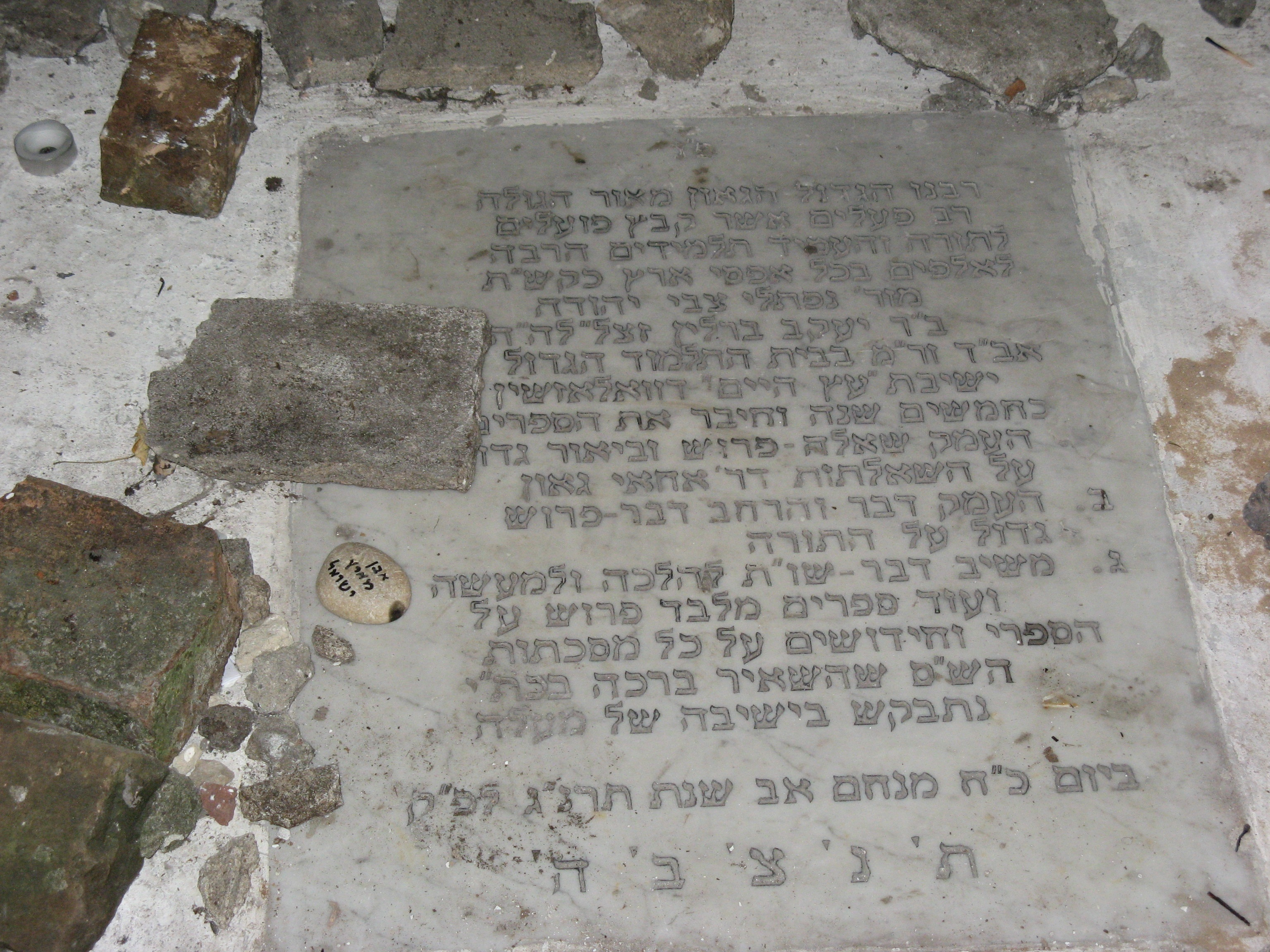
The grave of the Netziv at the Jewish Cemetery in Warsaw

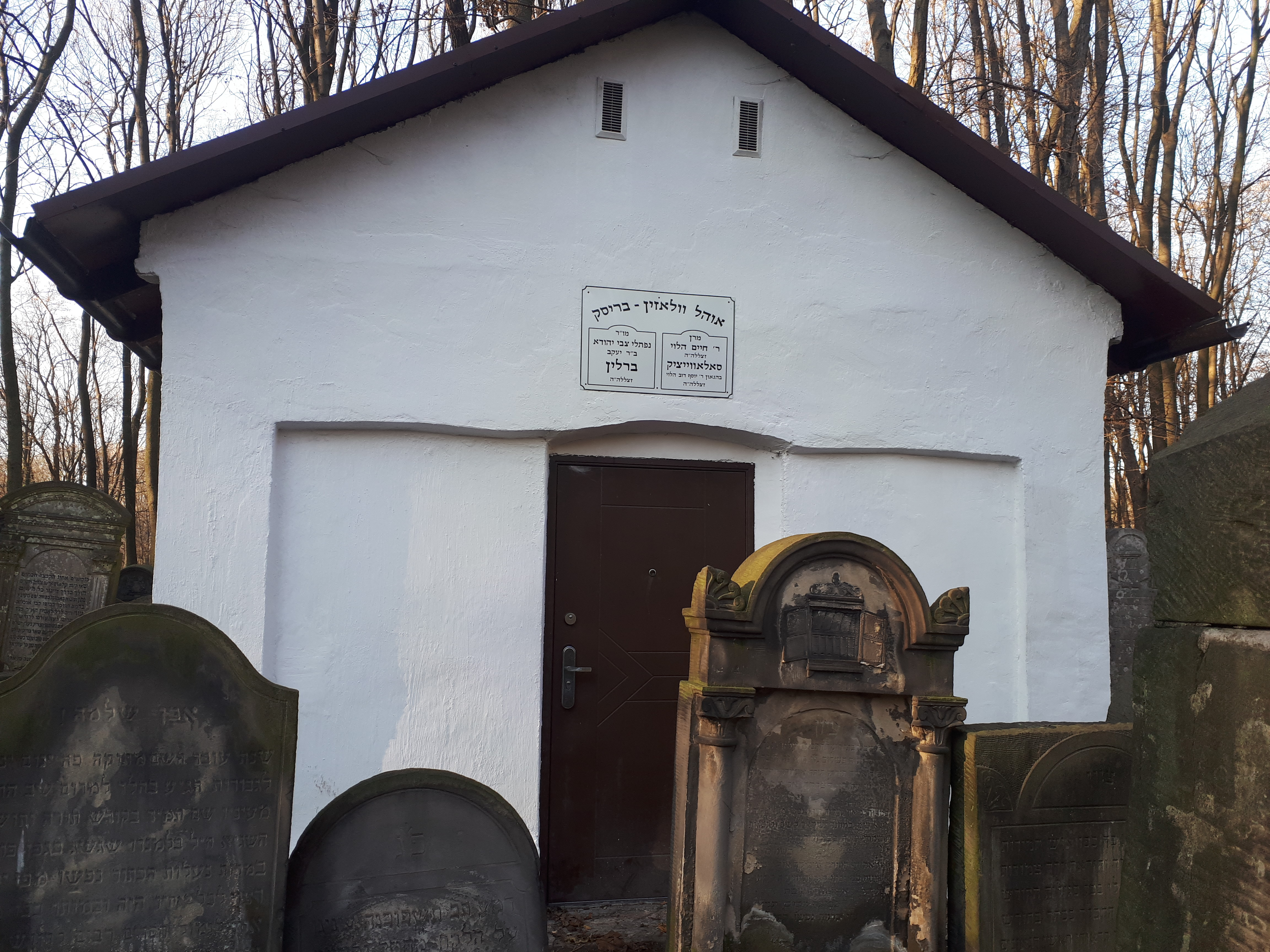
The tomb of the Netziv and Rabbi Chaim Soloveitchik in the Jewish Cemetery in Warsaw

The Netziv was a great supporter of the settlement of Eretz Yisrael and an active member of the Chovevei Zion movement. He was convinced that the awakening for aliyah to Eretz Yisrael stemmed from a Divine plan for the redemption of Israel. These ideas, scattered throughout his writings, were expressed succinctly in two letters he sent in 1886 to the Chovevei Zion associations. He compared the secular youth leading the rebuilding of the land to the returnees of the Second Temple period under Ezra the Scribe, where many of the returnees were Shabbat desecrators and intermarried with non-Jews. However, he emphasized that the settlement of the land must be accompanied by the observance of mitzvot in general and especially the mitzvot dependent on the land, without which the entire endeavor would be unworthy.

Though the Netziv initially did not actively participate in the movement due to the heavy workload of the yeshiva, he gradually became involved until, at the Druskininkai Conference (1887), he was appointed one of the three "advisory trustees" to lead the movement. Later that year, they issued a circular letter to all community rabbis about establishing charity boxes to collect funds for the settlement of Eretz Yisrael. As part of his duties, the Netziv worked to instill religious values in the movement. In his letters, he pointed out "flaws" he observed in the movement's activities and often aroused the anger of the secular leaders. For instance, when they wanted to appoint Yehuda Leib Pinsker as the head of the movement, he vehemently opposed the decision due to Pinsker's distance from religion. His spirit was particularly stirred by reports of the secular behavior of the BILU pioneers who settled in Gederah. The Netziv demanded action be taken against them, even suggesting their removal from the settlement. Eventually, he retracted this demand.

At the "Chovevei Zion" convention in Vilnius in 1889, he was re-elected as an advisory trustee. At the beginning of 1891, he published his essay "Acharit KeReshit" (The End as the Beginning), calling for enlistment in the work of settling the land "whether through material action — working the land or engaging in industry or commerce — or through spiritual action, that is, publishing beneficial books on this important subject." He also emphasized the obligation of Gedolei Yisrael to contribute to the process of the return to Zion.

All of the Netziv's activities with the Chovevei Zion took place outside the walls of the yeshiva, which he considered a sacred institution devoted solely to Torah study. It was not without reason that secret Zionist societies were established within his yeshiva. The first, named "Nes Tzionah," was founded in 1885 without his knowledge but was closed after the police discovered it. The second, named "Netzach Yisrael," was founded in 1890 with his knowledge.

== Views on contemporary issues ==
The Netziv emphasized the importance of unity and opposed rabbis who called for the establishment of separate communities, as had been done in Hungary and Germany. When Orthodox leaders sought to promote this idea in Galicia, he wrote that their counsel was "as harmful as swords to the body of the nation and its existence."

== Method in Torah study ==
The Netziv's approach to Torah study was unique in its focus on Midrashic literature and the literature of the Geonim. His seminal work, "Haamek She’elah," was written on the She'iltot of Rabbi Ahai Gaon of Shabha. His methodology closely aligned with the school of the Vilna Gaon (whose influence led to the founding of the Volozhin Yeshiva), making extensive use of textual emendations. While yeshiva study often focuses on theoretical learning detached from practical halachic rulings, the Netziv was also famous for answering halachic queries.

In the lengthy introductions to each part of "Haamek She’elah," the Netziv outlined his approach to learning. Torah study, he explained, consists of two foundations: received tradition and dialectical reasoning (which he termed "Esh-Dat" — the "dat" being the tradition and the "esh" the fiery dialectic). The Geonim, being close to the Talmudic era, based all of their words on tradition. In contrast, the Rishonim were compelled to derive their interpretations through reason and dialectic. The Netziv combined these two approaches in his study, striving to return to the foundations of the Geonim while supplementing them with the reasoning of the Rishonim. His understanding of halachic principles and laws was always underpinned by the She’iltot, Ba’al Ha’Itur, and the Rif.

His study of the early Rishonim led him to engage in textual criticism and to search for accurate manuscripts, where he demonstrated an impressive scientific rigor. In his quest for the most precise version of the She’iltot, he acquired various rare manuscripts.

== Writings ==
During his lifetime, his works "Haamek She’elah" on the She’iltot of Rabbi Ahai Gaon, his commentary Haamek Davar on the Torah, and "Rinah Shel Torah" on the Song of Songs were published. Additionally, he wrote a Responsa titled "Meishiv Davar," and a collection of novellae on the Talmud called "Meromei Sadeh" (based on the verse "And Naphtali is on the heights of the field," Judges 5:18), which were published posthumously. His sons, who published his responsa, refused to include a biographical introduction, as their father believed that such biographies constituted a Bitul Torah (distraction from Torah study) and were thus the "counsel of the Yetzer Hara."

=== Works ===
- Haamek Davar
- Shu"T Meishiv Davar
- Meromei Sadeh
- Sifrei Im Amek HaNetziv
- Davar Ha’amek – on the Nevi'im, published by Yeshivat Be'er Ya'akov, 1988.
- Haamek She’elah – on the She’iltot of Rabbi Ahai Gaon of Shabha
- Birkat HaNetziv – on the Mekhilta
- Rinah Shel Torah – on the Song of Songs
- Igrot HaNetziv
- Drashot HaNetziv – Jerusalem, 1993.
- Ma'amar She'ar Yisrael – on the role of Am Yisrael and the Galut.
- Imrei Shefer – commentary on the Passover Haggadah.

== Family ==
The Netziv had five children.

From his first wife, Reina-Batya, whom he married shortly after his Bar Mitzvah, he had three children:

- His son, Rabbi Chaim Berlin
- His daughter, Sarah-Rasha, wife of Rabbi Refael Shapiro
- His daughter, Drezel, who also married Rabbi Raphael Shapira after the death of her sister.

His first wife died in 1873 or 1874, after more than forty years of marriage.

After her death, he married Batya-Miriam (who died in Jerusalem in 1933), the daughter of his sister and his brother-in-law, Rabbi Yechiel Michel Epstein (author of the "Aruch HaShulchan"). She assisted him in managing the financial affairs of the Volozhin Yeshiva. Despite the significant age gap, she married him at the age of 28, driven by her desire to marry a Torah scholar. The couple had two children:

- Yaakov Berlin, named after his grandfather. His daughter, Tova Berlin-Papish, published her family memoirs in her book, "From Mohilev to Jerusalem."
- Rabbi Meir Bar-Ilan

== Memorial ==
Streets in numerous cities in Israel are named after him, as is the Ein HaNetziv kibbutz in the Beit She'an Valley.

== Bibliography ==
- Ha'amek She'eila ("Delve into the Question", the title playing on a verse in the Book of Isaiah that hortatively reads, "Delve, question"), a commentary on the She'iltoth, a geonic work of halakha by Achai Gaon;
- Meishiv Davar ("Response [in] Kind"), a collection of his responsa.
- Ha'amek Davar ("Delve into the matter"), a Torah commentary, the title resonating off his previously published commentary on the She'iltoth (listed above). See Oral Torah#In rabbinic literature and commentary for context.
- Rinah shel Torah, a commentary on the Song of Songs.
- Meromei Sadeh ("Heights [of the] Field", used as a reference to the tribe of Naphtali by Deborah in the Book of Judges), comments and insights on selected volumes of the Talmud.
- Dvar Ha'emek commentary on Nevi'im and Ketuvim.
- Imrei Shefer commentary on the Haggadah
- Birkat ha-Netziv, Commentary on the Mechilta
- Kidmas Ha'amek [She'eila], being the introduction to his commentary on the She'iltoth (listed above) and also entitled Darkah shel Torah by his son Rabbi Chaim Berlin. Translated into English by Rabbi Elchanan Greenman according to the latter title, as "The Path of Torah" (2007), it treats of the rabbinical history of Oral Law from Joshua until the early Middle Ages. Less well known is a similarly entitled but shorter introduction, Kidmas Ha'amek [Davar], contained in his Torah commentary and focusing more narrowly on the history of Scripture.

== Sources ==
- Epstein, B. Mekor Baruch. Sections translated as: My Uncle the Netziv by Rabbi M. Dombey. Brooklyn, New York: Mesorah Publications. ISBN 0-89906-493-0
- Gil S. Perl (2012). The Pillar of Volozhin : Rabbi Naftali Ẓvi Yehuda Berlin and the world of nineteenth-century Lithuanian Torah scholarship. Brighton, Mass.: Academic Studies Press. ISBN 978-1-936235-70-4
