= Red everlasting =

Red everlasting may refer to:

- Helichrysum sanguineum
- Helichrysum adenocarpum
- Phaenocoma prolifera
