= Chaim Berlin =

Orthodox rabbi, chief rabbi of Moscow (1865-1889)

Rabbi Chaim Berlin
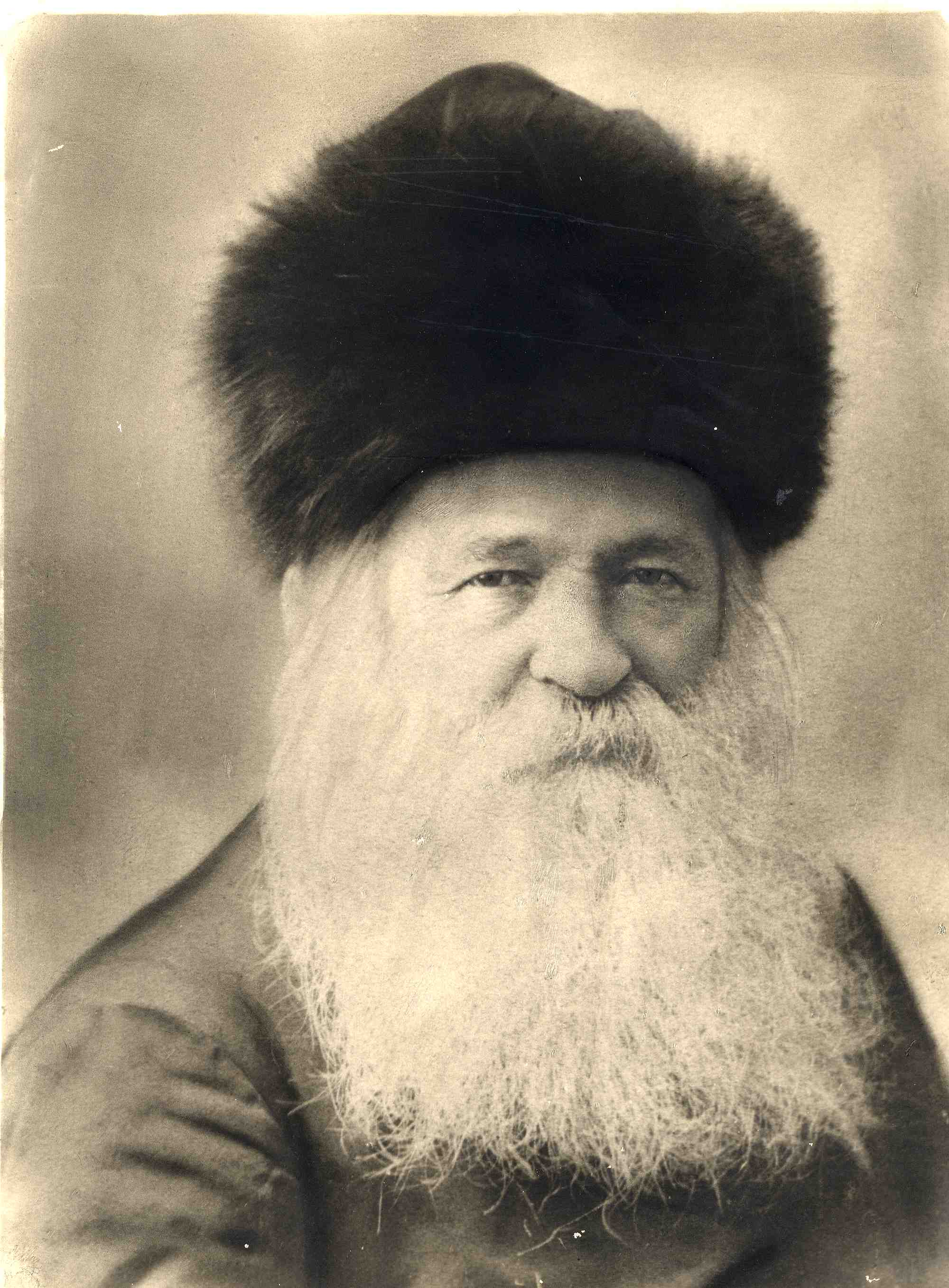
- Title: Chief Rabbi of Moscow

Personal life
- Born: Chaim Berlin; December 1832 Valozhyn, Oshmyansky Uyezd, Russian Empire (now Belarus)
- Died: 24 September 1912 (aged 79–80) Jerusalem, Ottoman Empire
- Buried: Mount of Olives Jewish Cemetery, Jerusalem
- Parent: Naftali Zvi Yehuda Berlin (father)
- Education: Volozhin Yeshiva
- Occupation: Rabbi, Rosh Yeshiva

Religious life
- Religion: Judaism
- Denomination: Orthodox Judaism

Jewish leader
- Position: Chief Rabbi
- Yeshiva: Volozhin Yeshiva
- Began: 1865
- Ended: 1889
- Other: Chief Rabbi of Kobryn (1892–1897) and Kropyvnytskyi (1897–1906)
- Yahrtzeit: 13 Tishrei 5673
- Residence: Moscow, Kobryn, Kropyvnytskyi, and later Jerusalem

Chaim Berlin (1832, Valozhyn – 1912, Jerusalem) (חַיִּים בֶּרְלִין) was an Orthodox rabbi and crown rabbi of Moscow from 1865 to 1889. He was the eldest son of the Netziv, Rabbi Naftali Zvi Yehuda Berlin.

== Biography ==
Chaim Berlin was the son of Naftali Zvi Yehuda Berlin, the Netziv, and his first wife. Berlin initially learned with his father.

His connection to the House of David as a descendant of Rabbi Meir Katzenellenbogen, the Maharam of Padua, is detailed in The Unbroken Chain.

Berlin lived in Valozhyn, Belarus, where he was head of a rabbinical court. In 1891, his father appointed him head of the Valozhyn yeshiva. There was controversy regarding this appointment as many students felt that Rabbi Chaim Soloveitchik was more deserving to head the yeshiva.

=== Family ===
He was married to his first wife from 1847 until her death in 1882. He subsequently was married from approximately 1884 until the death of his second wife in 1889.

== Career ==
He served as Rabbi of:

- Moscow from 1865 to 1889
- Kobryn from 1892 to 1897
- Kropyvnytskyi (Elizavetgrad) from 1897 until 1906.

Berlin left Russia in 1906 and settled in Jerusalem. He became the assistant chief rabbi of the Ashkenazi community with Rabbi Shmuel Salant. He also assisted Rabbi Salant in the management of the Rabbi Meir Baal Haneis Salant charity founded by Rabbis Zundel and Salant in 1860. After Rabbi Salant died at the end of 1909, Berlin led the Jerusalem Rabbinate and the Rabbi Meir Baal Haneis Salant charity until his death in 1912.

== Legacy ==
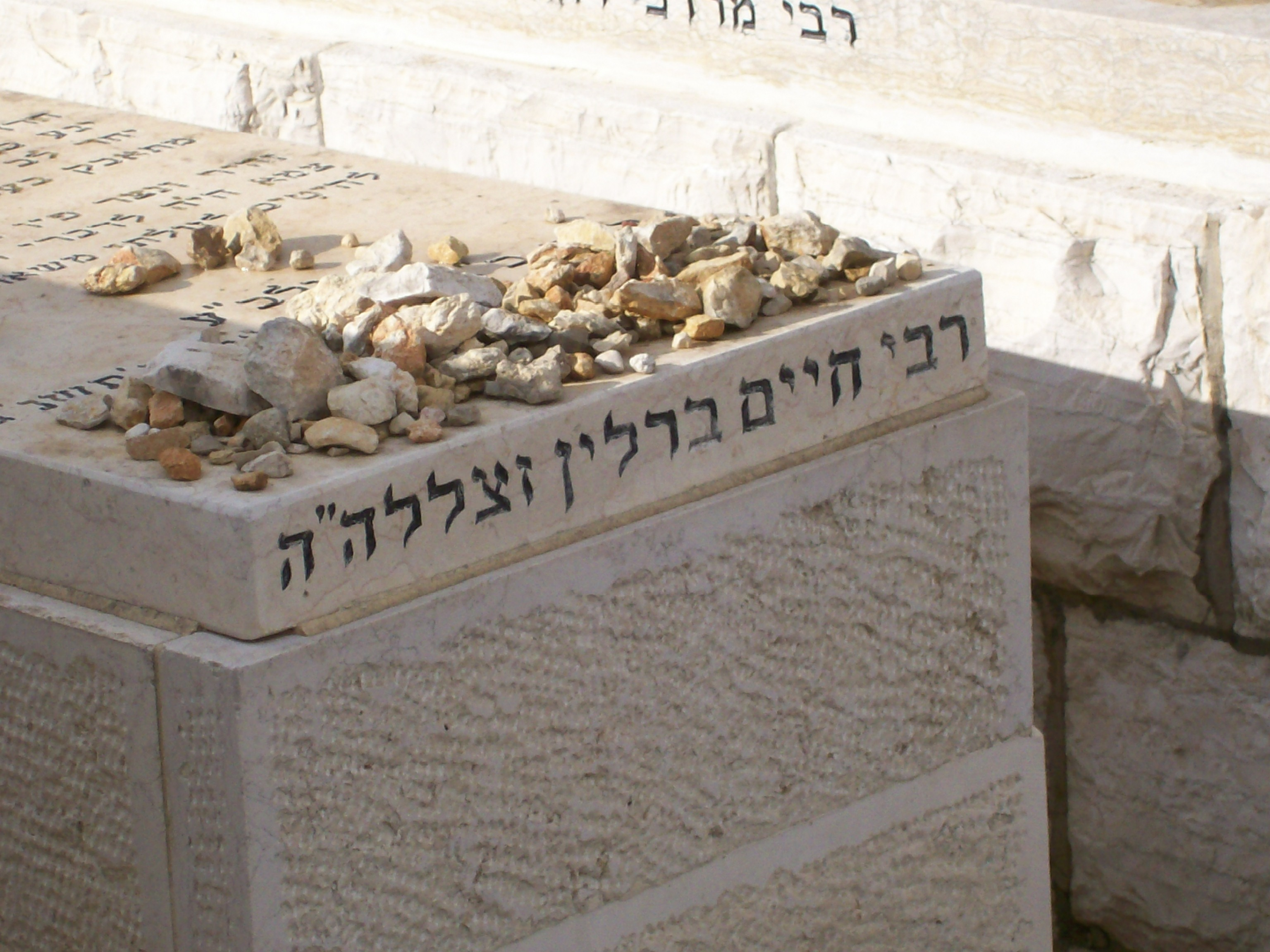
Grave of Rabbi Chaim Berlin in the Mount of Olives Jewish Cemetery in East Jerusalem

He died at age 81 on 13 Tishrei 5663 (September 24, 1912) and was buried in the Mount of Olives Jewish Cemetery in East Jerusalem.

Yeshiva Rabbi Chaim Berlin, established in Brooklyn, New York in 1904 as Yeshiva Tiferes Bachurim, was renamed for Rabbi Chaim Berlin in 1914, at the suggestion of his brother, Rabbi Meir Berlin (Bar-Ilan).

== Works ==
His major extensive writings were not published for nearly a century after his passing.
This changed with three publications:

- 2002: Sefer Nishmat Hayyim, She'elot u-Teshuvot (R. Ya'akov Kosovsky-Shachor ed., Beni-Brak, 412 pp.)
- 2003: Sefer Nishmat Hayyim, Mamorim u'Mechtavim (R. Ya'akov Kosovsky-Shachor ed., Beni-Brak, 424 pp.)
- 2008: Otzar Reb Hayyim Berlin, Shu"t Nishmat Hayyim, Jerusalem, 4 vol., 446, 462, 449, 298 pp.)
