= Yeshivat Ohr Yerushalayim =

American Yeshivah

Yeshivas Ohr Yerushalayim
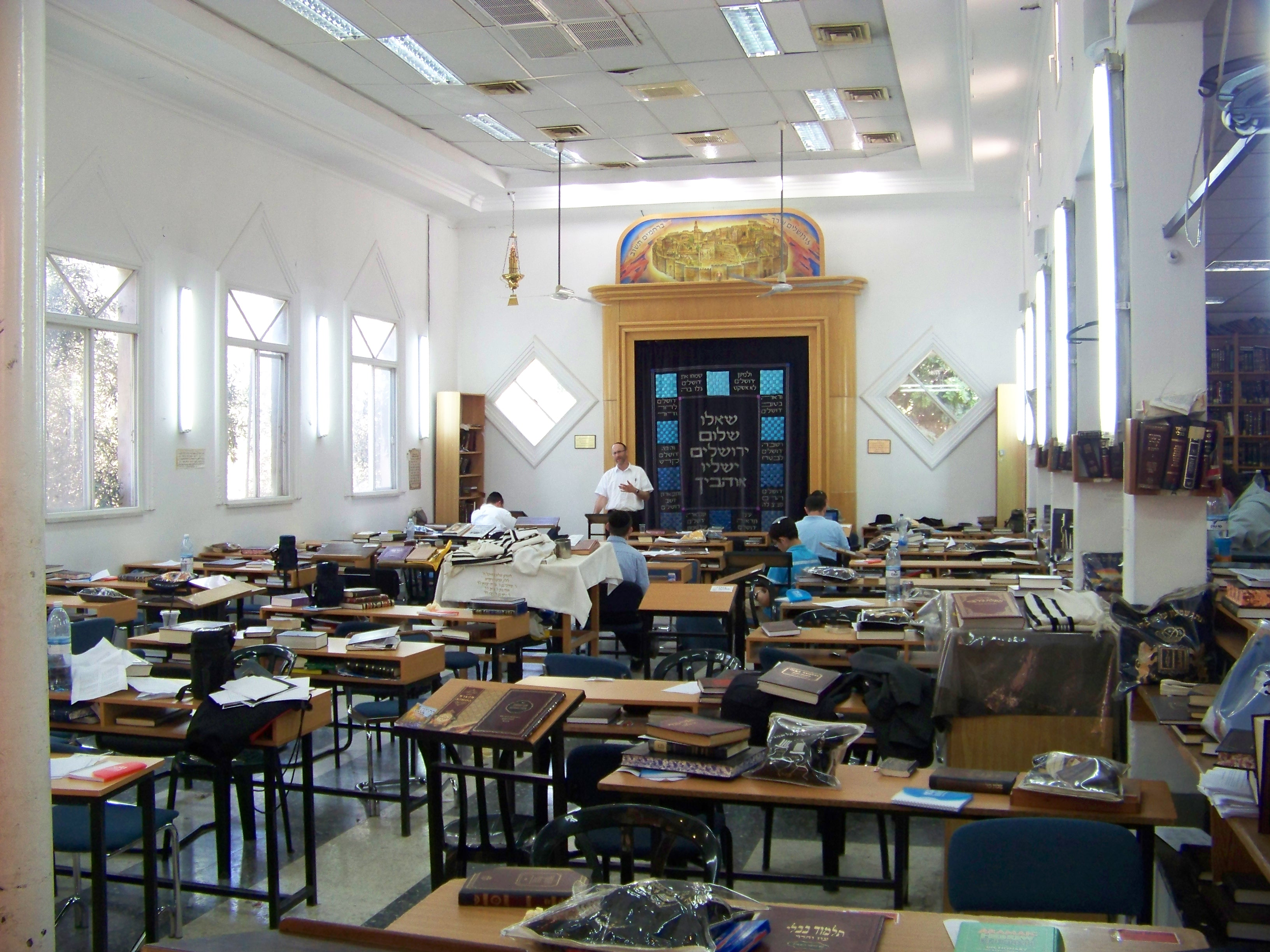
- The beis medrash at Yeshivas Ohr Yerushalayim

Location
- Beit Meir; Israel; 31°47′38″N 35°02′14″E

Information
- Principal: Rabbi Noach Victor
- Gender: Males
- Affiliation: Orthodox Judaism

Yeshivat Ohr Yerushalayim (ישיבת אור ירושלים) is an American yeshiva for the study of Torah. It caters to English-speaking students spending a year in Israel after high school. It is located on Moshav Beit Meir, 9 miles (14 km) west of Jerusalem.

During the summer, the yeshiva houses the NCSY summer kollel program.

== Faculty ==
Rabbi Noach Victor and Rabbi Noach Sosevsky serve as the roshei yeshiva ("head/dean"), and Rabbi Moshe Chaim Sosevsky is the Rosh Yeshiva Emeritus.

== History ==
The yeshiva has undergone significant changes over the years. In its earlier history, it faced challenges related to student behavior and community concerns. These issues raised questions about the institution’s direction and its ability to maintain its role as a center for Torah learning and personal development. Under the leadership of Rabbi Noach Victor, the yeshiva implemented a series of reforms including a proposal to change its initials from “OJ” to “YOY.”
