= Baruch Epstein =

20th century Lithuanian rabbi & scholar

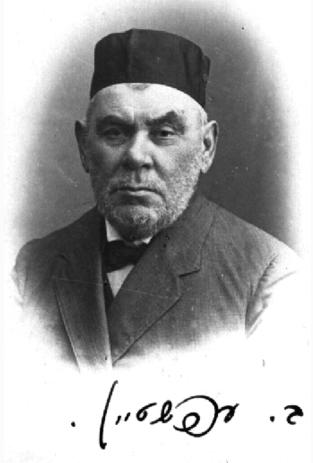
- Title: Rabbi

Personal life
- Born: 1860 Bobruisk, Russian Empire
- Died: 1941 (aged 80–81) Pinsk, Reichskommissariat Ukraine
- Parent: Rabbi Yechiel Michel Epstein

Religious life
- Religion: Judaism
- Profession: Bookkeeper

Jewish leader
- Successor: Rav Henkin
- Synagogue: Ezras Torah
- Yeshiva: Volozhin Yeshiva
- Position: Menahel

Baruch Epstein or Baruch ha-Levi Epstein (1860–1941) (Hebrew: ברוך הלוי אפשטיין) was an Ashkenazi Jewish rabbi, best known for his Torah Temimah commentary on the Torah. He was the son of Rabbi Yechiel Michel Epstein, rabbi of Novarodok and author of the work Arukh HaShulkhan.

== Biography ==
Epstein grew up in Novarodok, where his father was the communal rabbi, but moved to the city of Pinsk after his marriage to the daughter of Rabbi Elazar Moshe Horowitz, and lived there until his death, apart from a period from 1923 to 1926, which he spent in the United States looking (unsuccessfully) for a rabbinic position. During this period he served as the first menahel (director) of Ezras Torah from around 1924 until he was succeeded by Rav Henkin around the year 1925.

Although Epstein was a bookkeeper by profession, he had been a student at the Volozhin Yeshiva under his uncle Rabbi Naftali Zvi Yehuda Berlin (who became his brother-in-law after being widowed and remarrying Epstein's sister). Epstein authored a number of popular and scholarly works which are still used widely.

Epstein died of natural causes in the Jewish hospital when Pinsk was under Nazi occupation.

== Works ==
- Torah Temimah ("The Perfect Torah", a reference to Psalms 19:8) – a commentary on the Torah and the Five Megillot citing all quotes of a particular verse in the Oral Torah (Talmud or Midrash), and giving textual explanations.
- Baruch she-Amar ("Praised He Who Spoke", a reference to the opening paragraph of the Verses of Praise, daily morning prayers) – Multiple volumes, including a commentary on the siddur (Jewish prayerbook), Passover Haggadah and Pirkei Avot (Ethics of Our Fathers).
- Mekor Baruch ("Source of Blessing") – autobiographical work with notes on life in the Volozhin yeshiva and his uncle. Selections were translated as "My Uncle the Netziv".
- Mekor Baruch- on the Jerusalem Talmud
- Tosefet Beracha ("Added Blessing") – novellae on the Torah
