= Yechiel Michel Epstein =

Lithuanian rabbi (1829–1908)

Rabbi Yechiel Michel Epstein
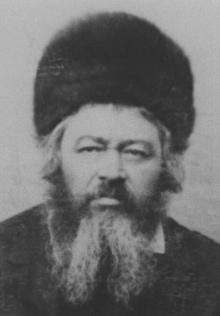
- Title: Author of Aruch HaShulchan

Personal life
- Born: 24 January 1829 Babruysk, Russian Empire
- Died: 25 March 1908 (aged 79) Navahrudak, Russian Empire
- Buried: Navahrudak
- Education: Volozhin yeshiva
- Occupation: Posek

Religious life
- Religion: Judaism
- Denomination: Orthodox

Yechiel Michel ha-Levi Epstein (Hebrew: יחיאל מיכל הלוי אפשטיין), (24 January 1829 – 25 March 1908), often called "the Aruch haShulchan" after his magnum opus, Aruch HaShulchan, was a Rabbi and posek (authority in Jewish law) in Lithuania.

== Biography ==
Yechiel Michel Epstein was born on 24 January 1829 in Babruysk, Russian Empire (presently in Belarus) to Aharon Yitzchak and Rashka Epstein. His father was a builder and contractor who spend much of his time traveling for his work, often for the Czarist government.

He had one brother, Benjamin Beinush Epstein, who lived in Saint Petersburg. The two brothers stayed in touch over the years, and when Epstein needed to travel to Saint Petersburg—usually to submit his writings to the Russian censor before publishing—he would stay at his brother's house.

As a child, Epstein studied in a traditional Cheder. His original intent was to follow in his father's footsteps and work as a merchant, while dedicating time to daily Torah study. In his youth, he engaged in trade and was fluent in Russian, a skill not commonly found among rabbis at that time. However, Rabbi Eliyahu Goldberg, rabbi of the nearby town of Parichi (and a student of Rabbi Chaim of Volozhin), took an interest in young Epstein and convinced him to leave commerce and dedicate himself to Torah study. Soon after, Epstein left for the famed Volozhin yeshiva, where he studied for two years.

In Volozhin, he met and started a lifelong friendship with Rabbi Naftali Zvi Yehuda Berlin (the Netziv), who later became the rosh yeshiva (head) of the Volozhin Yeshiva. After finishing his studies there, Epstein married Berlin's sister Michlah. Berlin later remarried Epstein's daughter Batya Miriam after the death of his first wife.

After his marriage, Epstein returned to Babruysk and taught in the Altshul yeshiva there. He received semicha (rabbinic ordination) from Rabbi Eliyahu Goldberg, who had been appointed rabbi and Av Beit Din of the Mitnagged community of Babruysk in 1852.

By 1862, Epstein was serving as a dayan (religious judge) on Goldberg's beit din. Most of the family's income, however, came from his wife's fabric store. When eulogizing his wife, Epstein remarked—perhaps in exaggeration—that for 30 years Michlah ran the family store, and he did not even know where the store was located.

In 1864, at the age of 35, Epstein was appointed rabbi of Novozybkov (east of Gomel, now Bryansk region), a town with a large number of Hasidic Jews, mainly adherents of Chabad Lubavitch and Chernobyl. Several months after arriving in Novozybkov, Epstein traveled to Lubavitch where he visited Rabbi Menachem Mendel Schneersohn, also known as the Tzemach Tzedek, the third rebbe (spiritual leader) of the Chabad Lubavitch Hasidic Jews. His major endeavor during this period was writing his first work, Ohr LaYesharim, a commentary to Sefer HaYashar of Rabbeinu Tam. He printed the first volume of this work in 1869, but lacked the funds to publish more.

In 1874, after ten years as rabbi in Novozybkov, Epstein was appointed the rabbi of Navahrudak, where he served for 34 years and until his death. He was recognized as a posek (decisor of Jewish law) and composed most of his writings in there.

Epstein was involved in many charitable endeavors. He was particularly close to Rabbi Shmuel Salant, the chief rabbi of Jerusalem, and wrote extensively on the obligation of all Jews to support the Rabbi Meir Baal Haneis charity that Rabbi Salant founded in Israel in 1860.

Epstein died on 22 Adar II 5668 (25 March 1908) and is buried in Navahrudak.

== Children ==
The Epsteins had 5 children:

- Eidel Kahanov, his first born, married a wealthy merchant from Odessa.
- Rabbi Dov Ber Epstein, the eldest son, moved to Jerusalem in 1902, where he served in a number of public positions.
- Brina Walbrinska took over publishing her father's works after his death. She was also on the executive board of the Navahrudak orphanage.
- Batya Miriam Berlin divorced her first husband, a young man from a wealthy family, several months after the wedding, as he was unwilling to fulfill his promise to dedicate himself to Torah study. When Rabbi Naftali Zvi Yehuda Berlin's first wife died several years later, she happily agreed to marry him, even though the rosh yeshiva was 30 years her senior. Among their children was Rabbi Meir Bar-Ilan.
- Rabbi Baruch Epstein was a bookkeeper by profession but produced a number of scholarly and popular works, most notably the Torah Temimah.

== Works ==
Arukh haShulchan, Orach Hayyim vol. 1

- Aruch HaShulchan – his magnum opus, a code of Halakha tracing the origins of each law and custom, clarifying the opinions of the Rishonim and arriving at a psak (decision) – often supported by (and sometimes in disagreement with) the Acharonim. Regarded by some as the most comprehensive, seminal, and original modern restatement of Jewish law since Rambam.
- Aruch HaShulchan he'Atid (Laying the Table of the Future) – a parallel work to Arukh HaShulkhan, summarising and analysing the laws that will apply in Messianic times. This work became more relevant when Jewish farming communities were re-established in Israel, since many agricultural laws which apply only in Israel are covered in this work.
- Ohr la-Yesharim – his first work, a commentary on the classic work Sefer ha-Yashar by the Tosafist Rabbeinu Tam.
- Meichal ha-Mayim – a commentary on the Jerusalem Talmud.
- Leil Shimurim – a commentary on the Haggadah for Passover.
- Derashot Kol Ben Levi – a collection of sermons he delivered in the main synagogue of Navahrudak, often including long Halakhic sections.

== Prominent rabbis he ordained ==
As a well-known authority of Halakha, many young scholars asked to receive his semicha (rabbinic ordination). Below is a partial list of prominent rabbis whom Epstein ordained:

- Rabbi Abraham Isaac Kook, the first Ashkenazi Chief Rabbi of British Mandatory Palestine.
- Rabbi Isser Zalman Meltzer, the rabbi of Slutsk and rosh yeshiva of the Etz Chaim Yeshiva in Jerusalem.
- Rabbi Yosef Eliyahu Henkin, prominent Orthodox rabbi and posek.
- Rabbi Yehezkel Abramsky, head of the London Beth Din rabbinical court and later rosh yeshiva of Slabodka yeshiva in Bnei Brak.
- Rabbi Shlomo Yosef Zevin, the founder and chief editor of the Encyclopedia Talmudit.
- Rabbi Yosef Shlomo Kahaneman, Orthodox rabbi and rosh yeshiva of the Ponevezh Yeshiva.
- Rabbi Yehuda Leib Maimon, Israeli rabbi, author, and leader of the Religious Zionist movement. He was Israel's first Minister of Religions.
