= Beit Meir =

Beit Meir: בית מאיר (Hebrew)
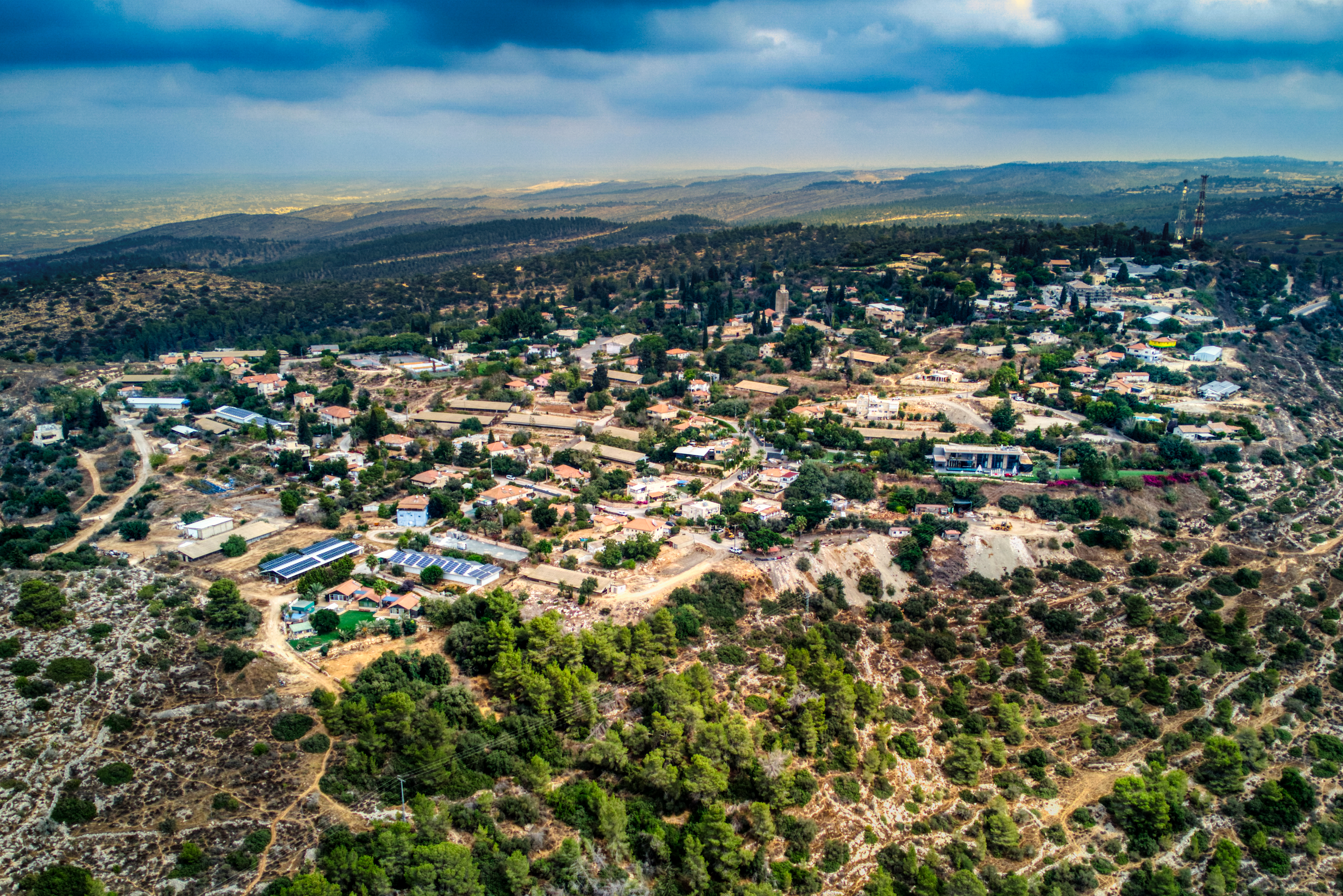
- Etymology: House of Meir
- Location within Jerusalem District Location within Israel
- Coordinates: 31°47′38″N 35°02′14″E
- Country: Israel
- District: Jerusalem
- Council: Mateh Yehuda
- Affiliation: Hapoel HaMizrachi
- Founded: 1950
- Population (2024): 678

Beit Meir (Hebrew: בית מאיר, lit. 'House of Meir') is a religious moshav in central Israel. Located around nine miles from Jerusalem, just off the Highway 1, it falls under the jurisdiction of Mateh Yehuda Regional Council. In 2024 it had a population of 678.

== History ==
Beit Meir was established in 1950, on the land of the depopulated Arab village of Bayt Mahsir. It was named after Rabbi Meir Bar-Ilan.

== Landmarks ==
- Masrek Nature Reserve
- Yeshivat Ohr Yerushalayim, a yeshiva for American post high-school students headed in the past by Rabbi D. Schecter and as of 2024 by Rabbi Noach Victor.
