= Meir Bar-Ilan =

Israeli rabbi (1880–1949)

Rabbi Meir Bar-Ilan מֵאִיר בַּר-אִילָן
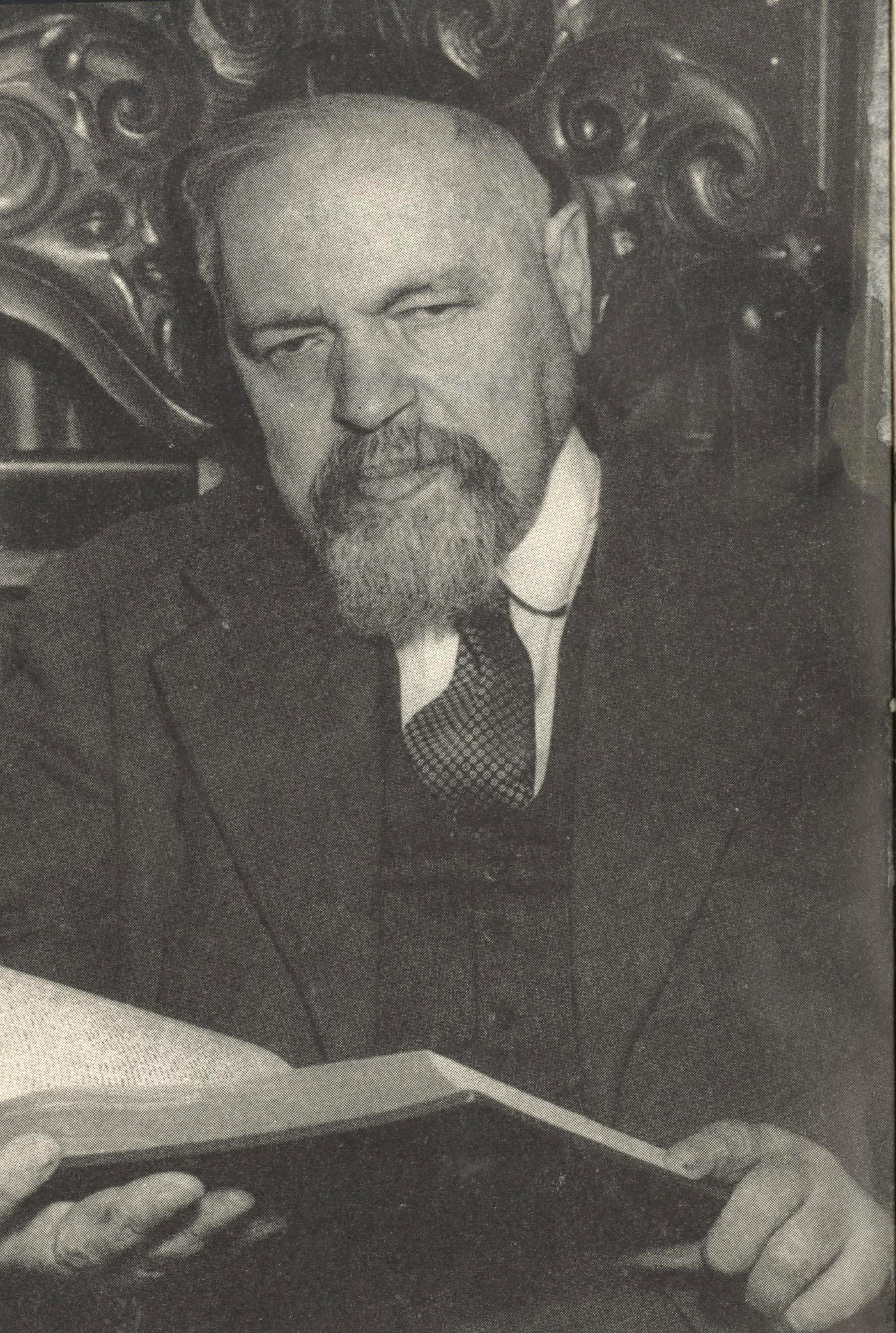

Personal life
- Born: Meir Berlin; April 10, 1880 Volozhin, Russian Empire
- Died: April 17, 1949 (aged 69) Jerusalem
- Buried: Sanhedria Cemetery
- Spouse: Baila Rabinowitz
- Parent: Naftali Zvi Yehuda Berlin (father)
- Education: Volozhin Yeshiva; University of Berlin
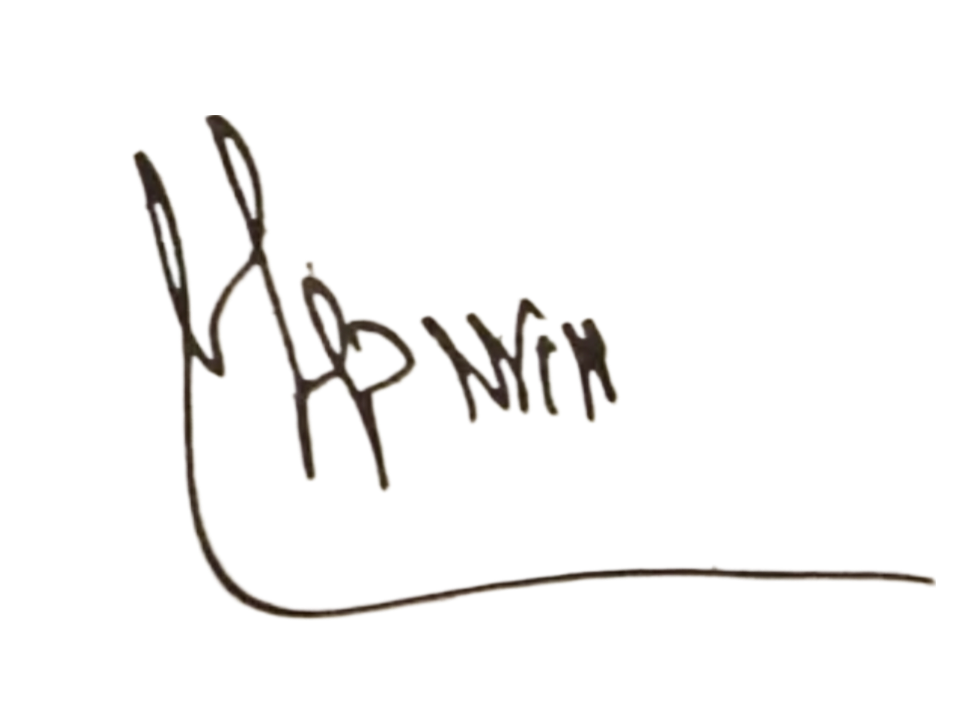
- Signature

Religious life
- Religion: Judaism
- Denomination: Orthodox Judaism

Jewish leader
- Organisation: Mizrachi

Meir Bar-Ilan (Hebrew: מֵאִיר בַּר-אִילָן; April 10, 1880 – April 17, 1949) was an orthodox rabbi, author, and religious Zionist activist, who served as leader of the Mizrachi movement in the United States and Mandatory Palestine. Bar-Ilan University, founded in 1955, was named in his honour.

== Biography ==
=== Early life ===
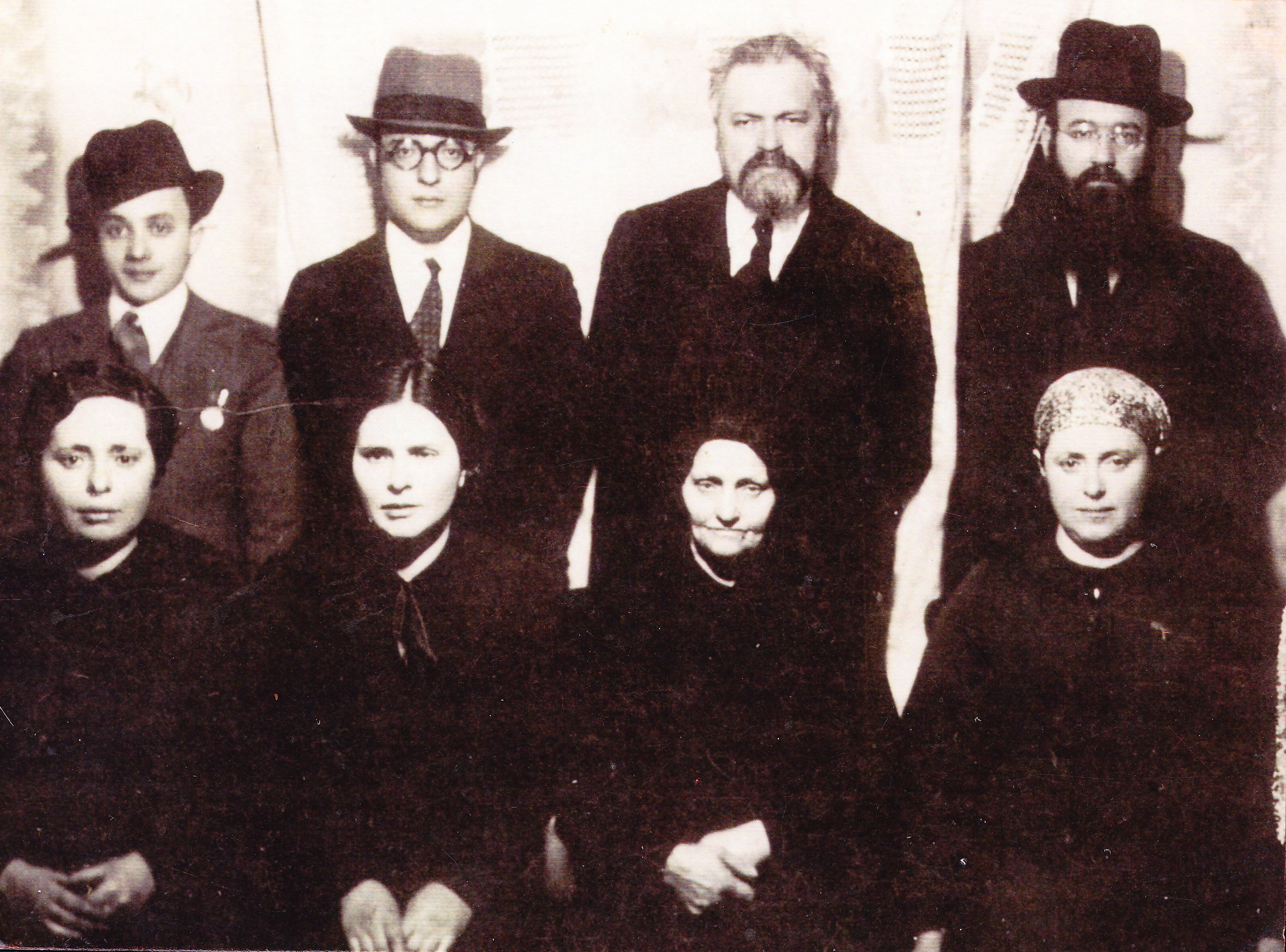
Bar-Ilan (standing, second from right) with members of his family.

Bar-Ilan was born Meir Berlin in 1880 to a Lithuanian Jewish family, the youngest son of Rabbi Naftali Zvi Yehuda Berlin and his second wife Rayna Batya Miriam Berlin (née Epshtein). Bar-Ilan's father was the head of the famous Volozhin Yeshiva in Lithuania. Bar-Ilan was also a descendant of Rabbi Meir Katzenellenbogen, the Maharam of Padua.

He studied at the Volozhin Yeshiva and, after his father's death in 1894, at the traditional yeshivas of Telshe, Brisk and Novardok, where he learned with his maternal grandfather, Rabbi Yechiel Michel Epstein. After gaining semicha in 1902 at the age of twenty-two, Bar-Ilan travelled to Germany to attend the University of Berlin. There, he became acquainted with a more modern form of Orthodox Judaism that had a more tolerant attitude to secular education and to political Zionism (although such attitudes were also present in the Lithuania of his youth). Bar-Ilan was deeply influenced by the local religious community and its philosophy of Torah im Derech Eretz.

=== Mizrachi movement and Ha’Ivri ===
In 1905 Bar-Ilan joined the Mizrachi movement, representing it at the Seventh Zionist Congress, at which he voted against the Uganda Proposal to create a temporary Jewish homeland in British East Africa, as suggested by Great Britain.

In 1911, he founded the Hebrew weekly newspaper Ha’Ivri in Berlin as a "non-party paper dedicated to all the affairs of Israel, faithful in its spirit to our religious tradition and to our national renaissance." That same year, Bar-Ilan was appointed secretary of the world Mizrachi movement. In 1913 he came to the United States and developed local Mizrachi groups into a national organisation, chairing the first American Mizrachi convention, held in Cincinnati in May 1914.

Bar-Ilan settled in New York in 1914, becoming president of the American Mizrachi movement the following year, a position he held until 1928. In his absence Ha’Ivri ceased publication in April 1914, but was re-established under Bar-Ilan's direction in New York in January 1916. Published until 1921, the paper's contributors included such prominent writers as S. Y. Agnon, Joseph Opatoshu, Reuben Brainin, Eliezer Ben-Yehuda, and Yehuda Leib Maimon. Bar-Ilan was also an active member of the Joint Distribution Committee during World War I, and served as vice president of the Central Relief Committee of New York City in 1916. He founded the Mizrachi Teachers Institute in 1917. From 1920 through 1922, Bar-Ilan briefly served as acting president for what is now Yeshiva University during the temporary absence of its then-president, Bernard Revel.

=== Life in Mandate Palestine ===
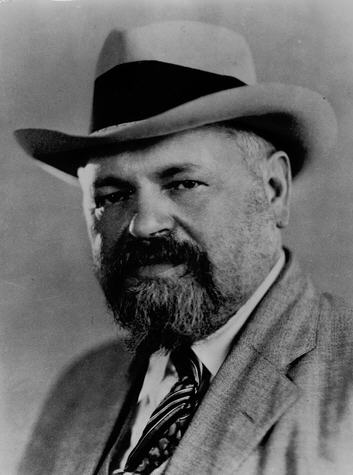
Meir Bar-Ilan in 1938

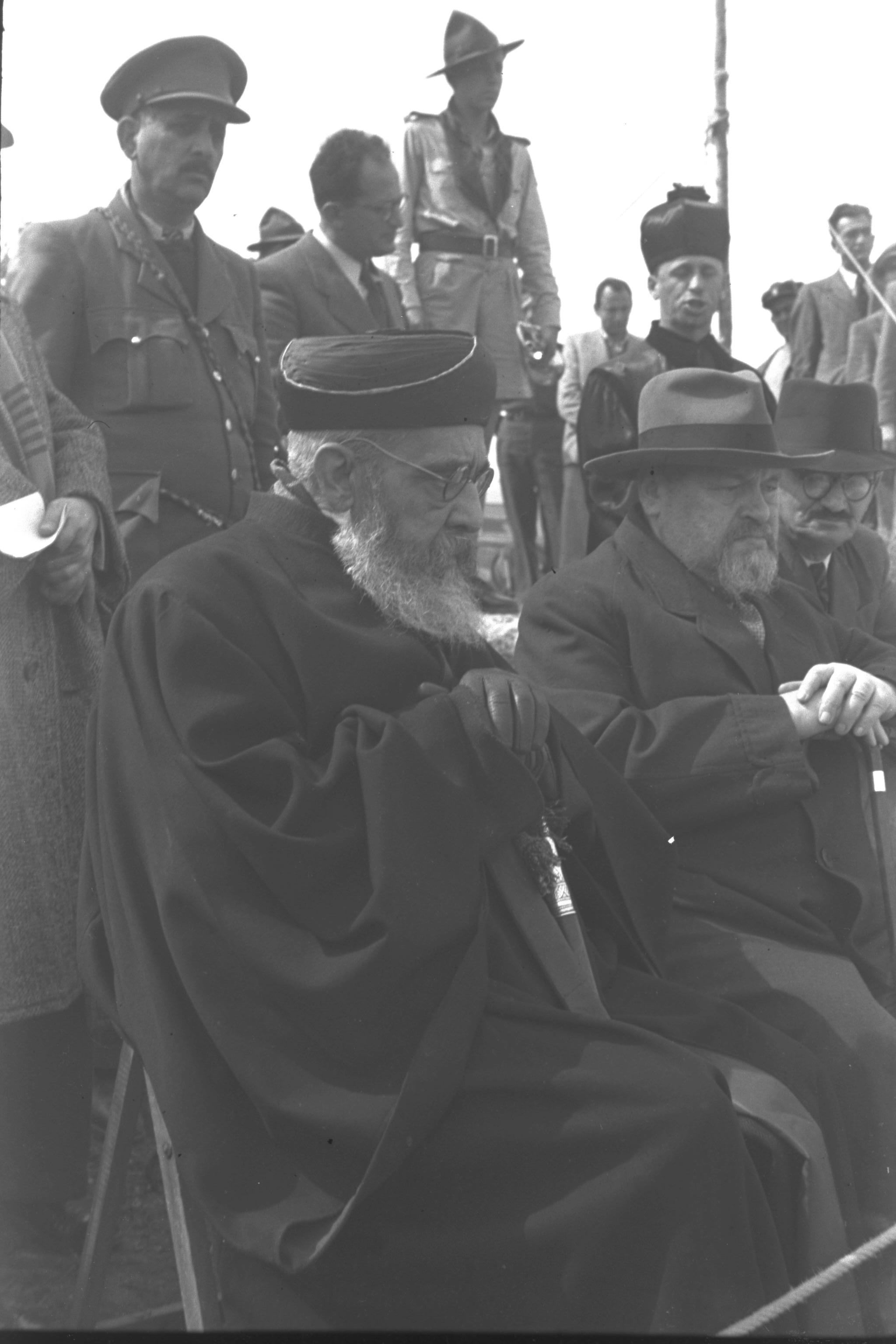
Bar-Ilan with Sephardi chief rabbi Ben-Zion Uziel at a World War II memorial service in 1946.

In 1923 he moved to Jerusalem. In Palestine, Bar-Ilan founded the daily newspaper Hatzofeh and initiated the Encyclopedia Talmudit, a Hebrew encyclopedia summarizing halachic topics in the Talmud, forty-two volumes of which have been published to date. Bar-Ilan also served on the board of directors of the Mizrachi Bank and, in 1925, became a member of the Board of Directors of the Jewish National Fund, devoted to financing the rebuilding of the Jewish homeland in the then-British Mandate of Palestine.

He was a vocal opponent of the 1937 British Peel Commission partition proposal and the 1939 British White Paper, and advocated civil disobedience and non-cooperation by the Jews with the British.

At the beginning of 1943, Bar-Ilan visited the United States to lobby the American government to rescue Jewish refugees and help establish a Jewish state. He secured meetings with leading politicians and foreign ambassadors, including Vice President Henry Wallace, Senator Robert Wagner, Senate Majority Leader Alben Barkley, and House Minority Leader Joseph Martin.

== Scholarship ==
Along with Rabbi Shlomo Yosef Zevin, Bar-Ilan was the editor of the Talmudical Encyclopedia (Hebrew: אנציקלופדיה תלמודית), Volumes I (Jerusalem, 1946) and II (published posthumously in 1949). He also wrote articles on Talmudic subjects for various periodicals. Notable works of Bar-Ilan include:

- Eretz Yisroel in der milḥome un nokh der milḥome (Yiddish: ארץ ישראל אין דער מלחמה און נאָך דער מלחמה; New York, 1934)
- Fun Volozhin biz Yerushalayim (Yiddish: פון וואָלאָז'ין בּיז ירושלים; in Yiddish, New York, 1933; in Hebrew, Tel Aviv, 1939–40), autobiography in two volumes
- Bishvil ha-Techiah (Tel Aviv, 1940)
- Raban shel Yisrael (Hebrew: רבן של ישראל; New York, 1943)

After 1948, his activities were scholastically oriented. He organized a committee of scholars to examine the legal problems of the new state in the light of Jewish law and founded an institute for the publication of a new complete edition of the Talmud.

== Legacy ==
Bar-Ilan inspired the founding of Bar-Ilan University in Ramat Gan by the American Mizrachi movement, named in his honour. The moshav Beit Meir is named in his honour, as are the Meir Forest in the Hebron Hills and Bar-Ilan Street in Jerusalem, as well as streets in several other Israeli cities.
