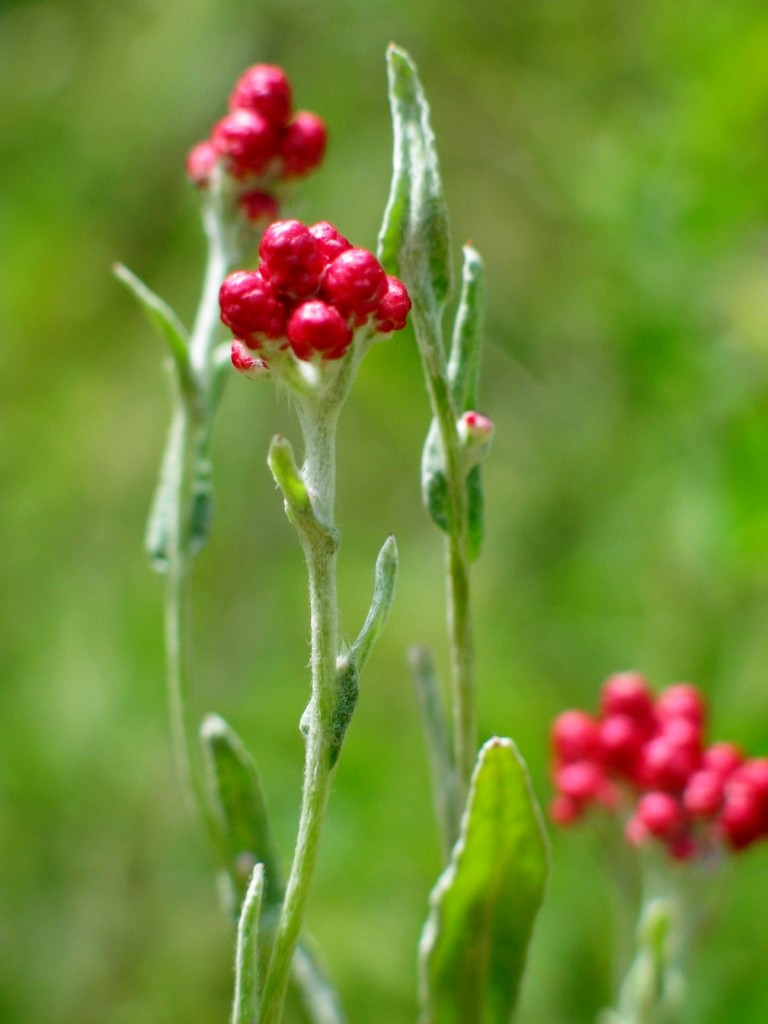

Scientific classification
- Kingdom: Plantae
- Clade: Embryophytes
- Clade: Tracheophytes
- Clade: Spermatophytes
- Clade: Angiosperms
- Clade: Eudicots
- Clade: Asterids
- Order: Asterales
- Family: Asteraceae
- Genus: Helichrysum
- Species: H. sanguineum

Binomial name
- Helichrysum sanguineum (L.) Kostel.

= Helichrysum sanguineum =

Species of flowering plant

Helichrysum sanguineum, known in English as red everlasting and red cudweed, is a flowering plant of the genus Helichrysum in the family Asteraceae. It grows in mountain forests in the Levant where it blooms in April–June. The flower, known in Hebrew as "Blood of the Maccabees"

== Name ==
Helichrysum sanguineum (L.) Kostel is not to be mistaken for Helichrysum sanguineum Boiss. = Gnaphalium sanguineum L., which is known in English as sowbread or cyclamen.

In Arabic, the flower is known as "دم المسيح" (dam al-Massiah), meaning "blood of the Messiah".

In Hebrew, it is known as "blood of the Maccabees" (Hebrew: דם המכבים, dam hamakabim). The name is derived from a legend saying that in every spot where the flower grows, a drop of blood has spilled on the earth.

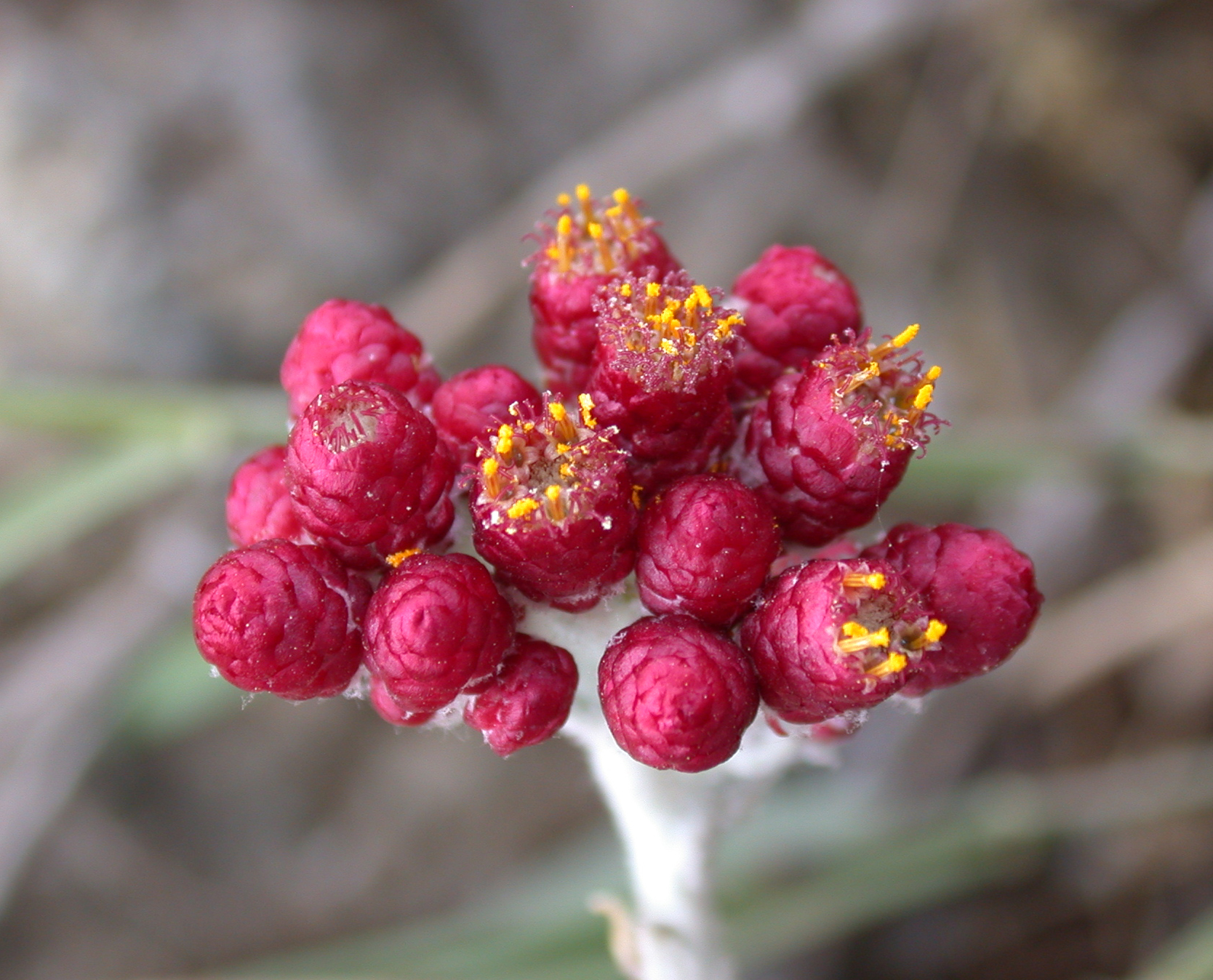
Helichrysum sanguineum on Mount Carmel

== History ==
The Hebrew name Dam hamakabim was coined by the botanist Ephraim Hareuveni in 1917. The symbolic connection to Israeli war casualties first appeared in a poem by Haim Gouri written in memory of 35 Palmach comrades killed in January 1948. Since 2019, the non-profit organization Dam HaMaccabim has been distributing pins with the flower throughout Israel.

== Distribution ==
The plant grows in the Levant, including: western Syria, the Mediterranean coast of Lebanon and Mount Lebanon up to an altitude of 1000 m, on the Golan Heights, in most of the northern and central part of Israel and the West Bank (Upper and Lower Galilee, around the Sea of Galilee, on Mount Carmel and the Coastal Plain south of it, Mount Gilboa, the northern part of the Jordan Valley, Samaria, the Judaean Mountains and the Shefela), and the mountainous Gilead region in Jordan (the areas of Jerash and Dibeen, Ajloun, and Al-Salt).

In Israel, Helichrysum sanguineum is an endangered species.

== See also ==
- Wildlife in Israel
- Flora of Lebanon
