= Torah Temimah =

Commentary on the Torah

The Torah Temimah (תורה תמימה - from Psalms 19:8 תּוֹרַת ה תְּמִימָה "The Torah of Hashem is perfect.") is the magnum opus of Rabbi Baruch Epstein. Published in 1902, it is a commentary on the Torah and the Five Megillot, the object of which was "to show the interrelationship between the Oral and Written Law." In so doing, Rabbi Epstein "weaves together related halachos and Aggadah together with concise explanations of the text." Rabbi Epstein's method was "to quote comments and interpretations from the vast Rabbinical literature on each Biblical verse (Bavli, Yerushalmi, Sifra, Sifre, Tosefta and Mechilta) and to then provide his own analysis of how the interpretations were deduced," frequently offering a novel explanation on the statement. Despite its scholarly nature, the "clear and lucid style of this work makes learning enjoyable and accessible to all."

== See also ==
- Rabbinic literature
- Oral Torah § In rabbinic literature and commentary.
