= Talmudical hermeneutics =

Methods of studying the Hebrew Bible in Rabbinic Judaism

Talmudical hermeneutics (Hebrew: מידות שהתורה נדרשת בהן) defines the rules and methods for investigation and exact determination of meaning of the scriptures in the Hebrew Bible, within the framework of Rabbinic Judaism. This includes, among others, the rules by which the requirements of the Oral Law and the Halakha are derived from and established by the written law.

These rules relate to:

- grammar and exegesis
- the interpretation of certain words and letters and superfluous and/or missing words or letters, and prefixes and suffixes
- the interpretation of those letters which, in certain words, are provided with points
- the interpretation of the letters in a word according to their numerical value (see Gematria)
- the interpretation of a word by dividing it into two or more words (see Notarikon)
- the interpretation of a word according to its consonantal form or according to its vocalization
- the interpretation of a word by transposing its letters or by changing its vowels
- the logical deduction of a halakhah from a Scriptural text or from another law

== Classes of rules ==
Compilations of such hermeneutic rules were made in the earliest times. The tannaitic tradition recognizes three such collections, namely:

1. the 7 Rules of Hillel (baraita at the beginning of Sifra; Avot of Rabbi Natan 37:10)
2. the 13 Rules of Rabbi Ishmael (Baraita of Rabbi Ishmael at the beginning of Sifra; this collection is merely an amplification of that of Hillel)
3. the 32 Rules of Rabbi Eliezer ben Jose. These last-mentioned rules are contained in an independent baraita (Baraita on the Thirty-two Rules) which has been incorporated and preserved only in later works. They are intended for aggadic interpretation, but many of them are valid for the Halakah as well, coinciding with the rules of Hillel and Ishmael.

For list of rules see List of Talmudic principles. For exhaustive list and examples from the Talmud, see Hillel Bakis (2013f).

It must be borne in mind, however, that neither Hillel, Ishmael, nor Eliezer ben Jose sought to give a complete enumeration of the rules of interpretation current in his day. For some reason they restricted themselves to a compilation of the principal methods of logical deduction, which they called "middot" (measures), although the other rules also were known by that term.

Those rules are traditionally studied and applied to the religious texts of some biblical canon, which were commonly believed to be inspired by God himself, through the words and the actions of human people. Therefore, those rules were related in coordination with the four independent level of biblical reading, as in the acronym pardes (פרד"ס).

== Dates of the rules ==
All the hermeneutic rules scattered through the Talmudim and Midrashim have been collected by Malbim in Ayyelet HaShachar, the introduction to his commentary on the Sifra, and have been reckoned at 613, to correspond with the 613 commandments. The antiquity of the rules can be determined only by the dates of the authorities who quote them, meaning that they cannot safely be declared older than the tanna to whom they are first ascribed. It is certain, however, that the seven middot of Hillel and the 13 of Rabbi Ishmael are from earlier than the time of Hillel himself, who was the first to transmit them. In any event, he did not invent them, but merely collected them as current in his day, though he possibly amplified them. They were not immediately recognized by all as valid and binding. Different schools interpreted and modified them, restricting or expanding them, in various ways.

The Talmud itself gives no information concerning the origin of the middot, although the Geonim regarded them as Sinaitic (הלכה למשה מסיני, "Law given to Moses at Mount Sinai"; comp. Rabbi Samson of Chinon in his Sefer HaKeritot).

== Rules of Rabbi Akiva and Rabbi Ishmael ==
Rabbi Akiva and Rabbi Ishmael and their scholars especially contributed to the development or establishment of these rules. Rabbi Akiva devoted his attention particularly to the grammatical and exegetical rules, while Rabbi Ishmael developed the logical. The rules laid down by one school were frequently rejected by another because the principles which guided them in their respective formulations were essentially different.

=== Superfluity in the text ===
According to Rabbi Akiva, the divine language of the Torah is distinguished from the speech of men by the fact that in the former no word or sound is superfluous. He established two principles broadening the scope of the rule of his teacher Nahum Ish Gamzu, who had declared that certain particles, like את, גם and או, were inclusive and certain others, such as אך, רק and מן, were exclusive. These two principles are:

- אין רבוי אחר רבוי אלא למעט (= "one inclusion added to another is equivalent to an exclusion")
- לשונות רבויין הן (= "words are amplifications")

Hence he interprets the following forms of expression as amplifications: an infinitive before a finite verb, e.g., הכרת תכרת (Sanhedrin 64b); the doubling of a word, e.g., איש איש (Yeb. 71a); and the repetition of a term by a synonym, e.g., ודבר ואמר (Jerusalem Talmud Soṭah 8 22b). Ishmael, on the contrary, lays down the principle "the Torah speaks in the language of men", and thus may have employed superfluous words and sounds; and forced values should not be assigned to them for the purpose of deducing new rules therefrom.

The same statement holds with regard to the repetition of an entire section. Ishmael is of the opinion that "the Torah at times repeats a whole section of the Law in order to give a new application to it". It is unnecessary, therefore, to draw a new inference from every repetition. Thus, for instance, in Numbers 5:5-8 the Torah repeats the laws of Leviticus 5:20-26 for the purpose of teaching the new ruling that in certain cases recompense for sin shall be made directly to the priests. Akiva asserts, on the other hand, that "Everything that is said in a section so repeated must be interpreted", and that new deductions may be drawn from it. According to this view, in Numbers 5:5-8 a new meaning must be sought in the repetition of the Law.

=== Vocalization of words ===
In cases where the consonantal spelling of a word (in the Hebrew text) differs from the traditional vowelization by which the word is pronounced, Akiva derives laws from the word's pronunciation (יש אם למקרא), while Ishmael derives laws from the written spelling (יש אם למסורת).

For example: In Leviticus 21:11, the word נַפְשֹׁת is written without the letter vav. The vowelization indicates that the word should be translated as "bodies", but the unvowelled consonants would normally be translated as "body". Since the vowelization indicates the plural, Akiva concludes that a quarter-log of blood (the minimum quantity by which a priest becomes impure through contact with a single corpse) also defiles him when it issues from two bodies. According to Ishmael, however, this minimum quantity defiles a priest only when it issues from a single corpse (for the word, according to the consonantal text, is to be read in the singular "nafshat").

=== Juxtaposition of sections ===
According to Rabbi Akiva, laws may be deduced from the juxtaposition of two legal sections, since "every passage which stands close to another must be explained and interpreted with reference to its neighbor". According to Ishmael, on the contrary, nothing may be inferred from the position of the individual sections, since it is not at all certain that every single portion now stands in its proper place. Many a paragraph which forms, strictly speaking, the beginning of a book and should stand in that position, has been transposed to the middle. Ishmael explains the occurrence of a section in a place where it does not properly belong (ולמה נכתב כאן) by declaring that "there is no first or last in the Scriptures", not as due to any special reason. Eliezer ben Jose expanded this rule in his baraita (Baraita on the Thirty-two Rules) and divided it into two parts (Nos. 31 and 32).

Nonetheless, this method is used in many instances, for example: Deuteronomy 22:11 forbids the wearing of shaatnez (a specific mixture of wool and linen), while 22:12 commands the wearing of tzitzit. The juxtaposition of these two verses is used to teach that (in theory) the transgression of shaatnez is not violated when one wears a four-cornered linen garment bearing tzitzit of wool (the blue tekhelet string of tzitzit is only valid when made of wool).

Juxtaposition through "exemplification" or משל has recently been described by Talmudist Daniel Boyarin as the sine qua non of Talmudic hermeneutics (Boyarin 2003: 93), for "until Solomon invented the mashal, no one could understand Torah at all" (Song of Songs Rabba). The phenomenon has been compared to the more recent phenomenon of sampling in modern popular music, especially hip-hop.

=== Fusion of methodologies ===
The opposition between the schools of Ishmael and Akiva lessened gradually, and finally vanished altogether, so that the later tannaim apply the axioms of both indiscriminately, although the hermeneutics of Akiva predominated.

== Detailed rules ==
=== Kal va-chomer (קל וחומר) ===
The first rule of Hillel and of Rabbi Ishmael is "kal va-chomer" (Hebrew: קל וחומר), called also "din" (conclusion). This is the argument "a minori ad majus" or "a majori ad minus". In the Baraita on the Thirty-two Rules this rule is divided into two (Nos. 5 and 6), since a distinction is made between a course of reasoning carried to its logical conclusion in the Holy Scriptures themselves ("kal va-chomer meforash") and one merely suggested there ("kal va-chomer satum"). The completed argument is illustrated in ten examples given in Genesis Rabbah xcii.

The full name of this rule should be "kal va-chomer, chomer ve-kal" (simple and complex, complex and simple), since by it deductions are made from the simple to the complex or vice versa, according to the nature of the conclusion required. The major premise on which the argument is based is called "nadon", or, at a later period, "melammed" (that which teaches); the conclusion resulting from the argument is termed בא מן הדין ("ba min ha-din", that which "comes from the rule") or, later, "lamed" (that which learns). The process of deduction in the kal va-chomer is limited by the rule that the conclusion may contain nothing more than is found in the premise. This is the so-called "dayyo" law, which many teachers, however, ignored. It is formulated thus: דיו לבא מן הדין להיות כנדון ("The conclusion of an argument is satisfied when it is like the major premise").

There is a dispute regarding the thirteen principles: Either the kal va-chomer is unique among the thirteen rules in that it may be applied by anyone in any circumstance in which it logically applies and the remaining twelve rules may only be applied with a tradition of application descending from Moses (or another authoritative legal board of the era) or all thirteen except a gezerah shava are open to all and only the latter is restricted in its application.

For example, one may make the following logical reasoning and support it using the basis of this rule: If, as a given, a parent will punish his or her child should the latter return home with scuffed shoes, surely the parent will punish his or her child should the latter return home with scuffed shoes, ripped pants and a torn shirt. The reasoning is based on pure logic: if the parent is so upset about one item of clothing, surely he or she will be at least that upset about the child's entire ensemble. A somewhat easier construct would be to assert "if a junior varsity basketball player can make a three-pointer, surely an excellent professional basketball player could make the same three-pointer," but this might be attacked as a poor analogy because not everyone can make every shot.

However, one must be careful of falling into the trap of an illogical deduction, as explained above by "dayyo". An example of this would be as follows: If a parent will punish his or her child with a minor punishment should the latter return home with scuffed shoes, surely the parent will punish his or her child with a major punishment should the latter return home with scuffed shoes, ripped pants and a torn shirt. This is an illogical deduction; although it might be a fair speculation, it cannot be proven with logic. All that can be proven is at least the result of the lesser offense. This would be akin to asserting "if a junior varsity basketball player can make a three-pointer, surely an excellent professional basketball player could make a half-court shot."

The discovery of a fallacy in the process of deduction is called "teshuvah" (objection), or, in the terminology of the amoraim, "pirka". The possibility of such an objection is never wholly excluded, hence the deduction of the kal va-chomer has no absolute certainty. The consequences of this are: (a) that the conclusions have, according to many teachers, no real value in criminal procedure, a view expressed in the axiom that the conclusion is insufficient to punish the violator of an inferred prohibition (אין עונשין מן הדין; Sifre, Num. 1); (b) that very often a passage is interpreted to mean something which may be inferred by means of a kal va-chomer (מילתא דאתיא בק"ו טרח וכתב לה קרא; Pesahim 18b; Yoma 43a).

An example of a situation in which transgressions are specifically not punished according to kal va-chomer is as follows: Leviticus 18:21 speaks of the prohibition of worshiping Molech, a form of worship in which children were passed through fire (presumably until dead). Now, one would assume that if it were prohibited to pass some of one's children through the fire, surely it would be prohibited to pass all of one's children through the fire –- a kal va-chomer. However, it is derived from the verse's use of the word "ומזרעך", lit. "and from your seed", that this prohibition is only when some of one's children are sacrificed in this worship; when all of one's children are sacrificed, this is not punishable. This is explained with the reasoning that the intention of the Molech worship is to improve the health and well-being of one's remaining children, whereas complete sacrifice defeats the purported purpose of the service, rendering it unpunishable by lack of intent to perform it properly.

=== Gezerah shavah (גזירה שוה) ===
The gezerah shavah ("Similar laws, similar verdicts") is the second rule of Hillel and of Rabbi Ishmael, and the seventh of Eliezer ben Jose HaGelili. This may be described as argument by analogy, which infers from the similarity of two cases that the legal decision given for the one holds good for the other also. The term gezerah shavah originally included arguments based on analogies either in word or in fact. Before long, however, the latter class was designated as hekkesh, while the phrase gezerah shavah was limited to analogy in the case of two different Biblical laws containing a word common to both. The gezerah shavah was originally restricted to a δὶς λεγόμενον (dis legomenon), i.e., a word occurring only in the two passages offering the analogy. Since such a word is found nowhere else, there is no reason to assume that it bears different meanings in the two passages. The gezerah shavah consequently attaches to the word in the one passage the entire sequence of ideas which it bears in the other. Such a gezerah shavah is purely lexicographical, as seeking to determine the exact signification of a word by comparison with another passage in which the full meaning of such word is clear. The rule thus demonstrates itself.

For example: The phrase מלק את ראשו ("to wring off the head") occurs only twice in the Pentateuch (Leviticus 1:15, 5:8). In 5:8, however, the meaning of the phrase is more closely defined by ממול ערפו ("from the neck"). The Sifra concludes, therefore, that the elaboration "from the neck" (in 5:8) is part of the concept of the word מלק, and consequently that מלק means "to wring the head from the neck" in 1:15 also.

In order to use this principle, one must first have a prior knowledge or notion about a certain thing (premise), from whence he wishes to apply the same notion or premise to something else that is currently unknown to him. In the Babylonian Talmud (Pesahim 66a), Hillel the elder made use of an argument by analogy when he wanted to show that it was permitted for a man to do labor on the Sabbath day when preparing his Passover offering on the eve of the Jewish holiday. Hillel observed that in two biblical verses appeared the words, "at its appointed time" (Hebrew: במועדו), the one in Numbers 28:2, for which there is some prior knowledge about its practice, viz. "Command the children of Israel... my [daily whole-burnt] offering...shall ye observe to offer unto me at its appointed time" (צַו אֶת בְּנֵי יִשְׂרָאֵל...אֶת קָרְבָּנִי...תִּשְׁמְרוּ לְהַקְרִיב לִי בְּמוֹעֲדוֹ), whereas the other verse, in Numbers 9:2, states: "Let the children of Israel also keep the Passover at its appointed time" (וְיַעֲשׂוּ בְנֵי יִשְׂרָאֵל אֶת הַפָּסַח בְּמוֹעֲדוֹ). Just as the words "at its appointed time" (Num. 28:2), used here in connection with the daily whole-burnt offering, one is permitted to do labor on the Sabbath day pursuant to its preparation, so, too, the words "at its appointed time" (Num. 9:2), used in connection with the Passover and its requirements for that day (i.e. the Passover offering), one is permitted to do labor on the Sabbath day pursuant to its preparation. Even so, the slaughtering knife used in butchering the animal was carried by the animal in its fleece until it reached the Temple Mount, where it was then slaughtered.

At a later period, however, the gezerah shavah emerged from these narrow bounds and inferred the identity of legal requirements from the identity of their terminology, even when such terminology occurred in many passages besides the two which formed the analogy. Thereby the gezerah shavah lost its inherent power of demonstration; for it is wholly unreasonable to attribute to a word a meaning which happens to be associated with it in a single passage, when various other passages connect ideas entirely different with the same word. Since, moreover, each individual teacher might choose which two expressions he would select for a gezerah shavah, contradictory conclusions might be drawn, which would each have the same claim to validity, since both were obtained by a gezerah shavah.

Consequently, in order to be binding, a gezerah shavah was obliged to conform to two requirements which, on the one hand, greatly restricted its application, and, on the other, gave legal decisions thus obtained the value of those deduced from a superfluous word in the Holy Scriptures. These conditions are:

- "No one may draw a gezerah shavah upon his own authority". Rashi (on the various passages) and many expositors who followed him explain this rule as implying that every gezerah shavah is assumed to have been handed down from Mount Sinai. Practically this rule stipulates that the use of this method of hermeneutics is to be permitted only to an entire board or council, and is to be employed only when its results agree with the traditional halakah, which thereby acquires the importance of a law implied in the Scriptures. In Yerushalmi this rule reads: אדם דן גזירה שוה לקיים תלמודו ואין אדם דן גזירה שוה לבטל תלמודו ("From a gezerah shavah conclusions may be deduced which support tradition, but not such as are opposed to tradition"; comp. Maimonides in the introduction to his Mishneh Torah).
- The words of the text which form the basis of the deduction from analogy must be free, i.e., they must be superfluous and non-essential, or they may not be used (מופנה להקיש ולדין הימנו גזירה שוה). This limitation of the gezerah shavah, however, to superfluous words is not generally recognized. Akiva considers the gezerah shavah valid when neither of the two words is superfluous (אינו מופנה כלל). According to Rabbi Ishmael, it is sufficient if the analogy is free on one side (מופנה מצד אחד), i.e., if one of the two words forming the basis of the analogy is pleonastic. Rabbi Eliezer alone requires both words to be superfluous.

=== Binyan ab mi-katuv echad (בנין אב מכתוב אחד) ===
In "binyan ab mi-katub echad" ("A standard from a passage of Scripture") a certain passage serves as a basis for the interpretation of many others, so that the decision given in the case of one is valid for all the rest.

=== Binyan ab mi-shene ketubim (בנין אב משני כתובים) ===
By this rule of "binyan ab mi-shene ketubim" ("A standard from two passages of Scripture") a decision in two laws having a characteristic in common (הצד השוה) is applied to many other laws which have this same characteristic. Rabbi Ishmael unites rules 2 and 4 in his third rule, while the same combination forms the eighth rule of Rabbi Eliezer.

=== Kelal u-perat and perat u-kelal (כלל ופרט ופרט וכלל) ===
The rules of "Kelal u-perat" and "perat u-kelal" ("General and particular, particular and general") is a limitation of the general by the particular and vice versa. According to Rabbi Ishmael, this principle has eight special applications, and thus includes eight separate rules in his scheme (Nos. 4–11). This method of limitation is one of the main points of difference between Ishmael and Akiva. According to the former, who follows his teacher Rabbi Nehunya ben HaKanah, the particular is only an elucidation of the preceding general expression, so that the latter includes only what is contained in the particular (כלל ופרט אין בכלל אלא מה שבפרט). But if still another general follows the particular, the two general expressions are defined by the intermediate particular, so that the law applies only to what is like the particular (כלל ופרט וכלל אי אתה מרבה אלא כעין הפרט). Akiva, on the contrary, applies the rule of increase and decrease (רבוי ומיעוט) which had been taught him by his teacher Nahum of Gimzo. According to this principle, the general followed by a particular subsumes everything which is like the particular (Sanhedrin 45b, 46a). If, however, another general term follows the particular, the former subsumes also what is not similar to the latter. The two general terms are decreased in only one respect by the intermediate particular (רבוי ומיעוט ורבוי ריבה הכל ומאי מיעט דבר אחר; Shebu. 26a; comp. also Rashi on Sanhedrin l.c.).

The difference between kelal u-perat u-kelal (כלל ופרט וכלל) and ribbui u-miyut u-ribbui (רבוי ומיעוט ורבוי) is exemplified in the following example: Exodus 25:31 states ועשית מנרת זהב טהור מקשה תיעשה המנורה, "You shall make a Menorah of pure gold, hammered out shall the Menorah be made." The repetitive fashion of the statement can be explained by the kelal u-perat u-kelal or the ribbui u-miyut u-ribbui.

Whichever method of deduction is employed, the word ועשית ("You shall make") is an objective generalization, the words מנרת זהב ("pure gold") are an objective specification and the word תיעשה ("shall be made") is again an objective generalization. The rule of kelal u-perat u-kelal works to teach that anything similar to the specification is deemed appropriate, while the rule of ribbui u-miyut u-ribbui is more inclusive, allowing everything except the thing most dissimilar to the specification.

Thus, Rashi's commentary in Rosh Hashanah 24b asserts that, according to the former method of learning this verse, the Menorah could, when necessary, be constructed of any metal (deemed in the same category of and thus similar to gold), whereas use of the latter method of learning would allow the Menorah to be constructed of anything but clay (deemed the material most dissimilar to gold). This argument arose because the gemarah made reference to a wooden Menorah overlaid with tin that was constructed in the times of the Chashmunaim and used in the Temple service.

=== Ka-yotze bo mi-makom acher (כיוצא בו ממקום אחר) ===
The rule "Ka-yotze bo mi-makom acher" ("Like that in another place") refers to explaining a Biblical passage according to another of similar content.

=== Davar ha-lamed me-inyano (דבר הלמד מעניינו) ===
Dabar ha-lamed me-inyano ("Something proved by the context") refers to definition from the context. Rabbi Ishmael omits rule 6 entirely, and has another (No. 13) instead which is not found in Hillel, and which reads thus: שני כתובים המכחישים זה את זה, עד שיבוא הכתוב השלישי ויכריע ביניהם ("If two passages contradict each other, this contradiction must be reconciled by comparison with a third passage"). The method of solution of such opposing statements by the help of a third passage is a point of divergency between Ishmael and Akiva. According to the latter, the third sentence decides in favor of one of the two contradictory statements (Mekhilta, ed. Isaac Hirsch Weiss, 6a); according to the former, it modifies the interpretation of both. With regard to the meaning of words which are pointed in the text, Simeon ben Eleazar laid down the rule that if the pointed part of the word (נקודה) is equal to the unpointed part (כתב) in length, the word must not be interpreted at all; but if one part is longer than the other, such part must be interpreted (Genesis Rabbah lxxviii.). Concerning the interpretation of words by a change of letters or vowels the rule is: אל תקרא ("Do not read so, but so"). Under this rule the integrity of the text itself is not assailed, the changes made being only for the purpose of explanation.

To support a halakhic decision, and more especially to find a point of departure in the aggadah, the traditional reading of a word is altered by transposition of its consonants or by substitution of others which are related to them, or the consonant-group is retained with alteration of its vowels, the last method being the most frequent. A halakic example of this form of hermeneutics is the interpretation of the word "kapot" (bough; Leviticus 23:40) as though it were "kaput" (bound; Sifra, ed. Weiss, p. 102d; Sukkah 32a). It is noteworthy, moreover, that only the tannaim derived new halakot with the aid of these rules, while the amoraim employed them only in advancing haggadic explanations or in establishing the old halakhot of the Tannaim.

== See also ==
- List of logical arguments in the Talmud
- Hillel Bakis (2013f), Interpret the Torah. Rabbinical traditions and methods, (with examples from the Talmud), Chapters 6 to 8 pp. 151–282; French (Hotsaat Bakish, Montpellier.
