= Moses sees Rabbi Akiva (Menachot 29b) =

Passage in the Babylonian Talmud

Moses sees Rabbi Akiva teaching the Oral Torah, and later meeting his fate at the hands of the Romans, in a sugya (passage) in the Babylonian Talmud. The sugya appears in tractate Menachot (29b), which generally deals with Temple offerings. Jewish commentaries have drawn many lessons from this story, on topics ranging from rabbinic authority to interpretive innovation to the justification of human suffering (theodicy).

== Context and summary ==
The sugya assumes familiarity with several aspects of rabbinic beliefs and practice. The opening assumes that God reveals the Torah to Moses at Mount Sinai and that this revelation incorporates the Oral Torah of rabbinic teachings, not just the written scripture of the Hebrew Bible. The opening also refers to the "crowns" (tagim) on letters for the calligraphy of a Torah scroll. Readers are expected to know that Rabbi Akiva, a leading sage of the early rabbinic period, was known for his interpretive creativity, and that he was one of the ten martyrs who were tortured and killed by Romans during the Bar Kokhba revolt. Finally, it is helpful to know that there is a category of Jewish law that is authoritative because it is said to be a law given to Moses at Sinai.

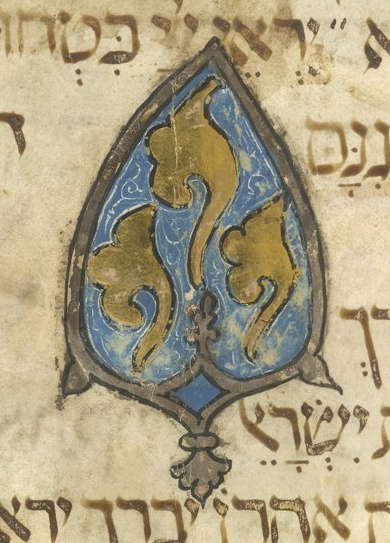
Three stylized yod letters in an illustrated Haggadah. At its tip, there are three yod letters in typical calligraphy.

The immediate context for the story is a discussion of scribal writing and, as scholars have noted, a mishnah about what prevents (me'akev) proper writing of a mezuzah parchment, along with a statement by Rabbi Yehudah about the kotz (thorn or tip) of the letter yodh.

In this Talmudic sugya, Rav Yehudah narrates the story, which can be summarized as follows: When Moses ascended into heaven (or Mount Sinai), he saw God preoccupied with making ornamental "crowns" (tagim) for the letters of the scriptural Torah. When Moses inquired what prevents (me'akev) God from giving the Torah and instead making these embellishments. God explained that a man named Akiva ben Yosef would be born, in a future generation, and that he would derive "heaps" of halakha (Jewish laws) from "each and every thorn" (kotz) on Torah letters. Moses requested that he be allowed to see this sage, and God assented: suddenly, Moses found himself sitting in Akiva's beit midrash or study hall. As Moses listened to Akiva's teachings about the Torah, he grew weary or dismayed, because (ironically) Moses could not understand it. However, when one of the students asked Akiva for the source of his teaching, Akiva replied that it was a "law given to Moses at Sinai", so Moses was put at ease. Upon returning to God, Moses asks why he was given the Torah and not the great Rabbi Akiva. God tells him to be silent, it arose in God's mind that way. Moses then asks to see Akiva's ultimate reward, so God shows Moses the grisly aftermath of Akiva's execution. Horrified, Moses demands God explain His actions, at which point God again tells Moses to be silent because that is how it came to mind for God.

In the story, the word kotz has usually been translated as thorn or thistle. However, lexicography scholar Shlomo Naeh traced it to a rare word for biblical pericope (a unit of verses).

The word me'akev (prevents) is also out of place, since Jewish law would ordinarily use the term to invalidate (posul) the parchment.

== Academic and religious responses ==
Jeffrey Rubenstein says that this narrative stands out because it breaks through the usual separation, in rabbinic literature, between biblical and post-biblical characters.

The narrative presumes a belief in reward and punishment and, says Rubenstein, it pivots around God telling Moses to be silent. This sugya implies that humans cannot comprehend suffering, such as Akiva's, though the lesson is obscure, "is the story a failed theodicy, or a protest against the unjust suffering of the righteous?"

According to Louis Ginzberg, "this story gives in naive style a picture of Akiba's activity as the father of Talmudical Judaism." The style is packed with alliterative and other poetic features, along with a literary structure that arguably reflects the tension between authority and interpretive innovation. Moses encounters Akiva as a teacher and as a martyr, in two parallel parts of the sugya.

=== Revelation and rabbinic authority ===
The story of Moses seeing Akiba deals with the broadening of Jewish teachings beyond revealed scripture, the Hebrew Bible, with a self-conscious attention to how far rabbinic exegesis has gone, as discussed by Rubenstein. David Weiss Halivni sees the sugya as an exemplar of a minimalist position on divine revelation, leaving space for rabbinic interpretation. He states the story is often misunderstood:

Though this story is sometimes interpreted to support the claim that each succeeding generation has an equal share in revelation, and that contemporary exegesis is not beholden to the past, it actually expresses the contrary notion that the arguments and details worked out by scholars like R. Akiba were grounded upon principles that had been revealed to Moses at Sinai.

Kromhout and Zwiep (p. 145) see the sugya as justifying the rabbi's "maximum freedom in developing Jewish law" by opening up the distance between revelation at Sinai and midrash (interpretation), though Jewish thinkers such as Semuel da Silva viewed God as the direct author of both Written and Oral Torah.

=== Satirizing or promoting interpretation? ===
Daniel Boyarin and Yair Furstenberg argue that the sugya, when Moses sees Rabbi Akiva, is to be read in light of ancient Greek satire from the Second Sophistic period, especially with the bewilderment of Moses at Akiva's implausible interpretations. The satire reading may be undermined by noticing other Talmudic texts that portray Moses as prone to misunderstanding, not to mention the gruesome ending, which is far from comic.

Instead, Azzan Yadin-Israel connects the sugya, and the confounded Moses, to the motif of the "ignorant messenger" in later biblical prophets, such as Jeremiah, Zechariah, and Daniel. This humbling of prophetic knowledge is combined, according to Yadin-Israel, with the valorization of interpreters such as Rabbi Akiva in the Menachot 29b sugya and elsewhere (Hagigah 15b and Numbers Rabbah 19.6). Moreover, he suggests that the sugya, when Moses sees Rabbi Akiva, reflects a shift after tannaitic (early rabbinic) literature to revalue interpretation in the Talmudic period.

As a classic text about Jewish interpretation, the Menachot 29b sugya also has been used to illustrate the shift to interpretation in Jewish "epoch-making events", such as the Shoah.

=== Cross-cultural comparisons ===
The visit of Moses to see Akiba has been compared to Christian narratives that have Moses going to teach Church fathers in the desert. More narrowly, the "crowns" in Jewish calligraphy have been compared to those in ancient Coptic and Greek writing. A German scholar of religious studies, Holger Zellentin, compares Menachot 29b to Christian stories of the transfiguration of Jesus, which typically showed Jesus as superior to Moses, sometimes with an anti-Jewish tone. The rabbinic counter-narrative quietly alludes to its Christological parallel and it sets up Akiva as "a messianic figure, but not the Messiah; and he is martyred and his body consumed, but he is not yet resurrected." Zellentin sees the story as teaching about silence in the face of incomprehensible acts of the divine.

=== Contemporary Judaism ===
The story of Moses and Akiva has been grist for sermons. For example, politically conservative, Orthodox rabbi Meir Soloveitchik wrote about the sugya in a 2008 sermon with the idea that the Torah, with its detailed calligraphy, is an in-depth "love letter" from God to the Jewish people. The sugya was also used in 2015 by politically liberal, Reform rabbi Angela Buchdahl, to support the notion that Jews have always been engaged in re-forming its tradition through interpretation. A British rabbi, Sylvia Rothschild, quoted the sugya when giving a sermon at the Pinkas Synagogue in Prague, saying that just as Moses was puzzled by Akiva's approach, so her ancestor Pinchas Halevy Horowitz (16th C.) would not understand much of contemporary Judaism, though some aspects would be familiar. The text also the basis of the afterword to the queer-inclusive Seder Oneg Shabbos bentcher.
