= Oral Torah =

Practices not in the Written Torah

The Five Books of Moses, what most people call the Torah, are considered the most ancient and sacred possessions of the Jews and Judaism. The teachings written there form the original core of the Jewish understanding of the world, and especially their understanding of themselves and their relationship with God and with the world. Jews all over the world continue to study these teachings, formally and informally, directly from the written texts of these books, which are thousands of years old.

But the traditional view, which has been passed down over the generations, holds that this series of five most ancient and sacred books are only part (the central part) of God's instruction to the Israelites and their descendants, the Jewish people. According to the rabbis, the teachers who have been passing down the Jewish traditions for over two thousand years, this "Written Torah" (תּוֹרָה שֶׁבִּכְתָב, Tōrā šebbīḵṯāv) forms the core of God's teaching ("torah", lit. "instruction") to Israel, and is supplemented by an Oral Torah (or Oral Law; תּוֹרָה שֶׁבְּעַל־פֶּה, Tōrā šebbəʿal-pe), which consists of that vast body of sacred Jewish teachings that were memorized and repeated orally and were not written down formally until much later.

According to the Talmud, the Oral Torah was given to Moses at Mount Sinai as a fully binding, holistic Jewish code of conduct and body of sacred lore and history which accompanies its written counterpart. The Oral Torah encompasses a wide swathe of rituals and worship practices while also detailing the type of relationships individuals are expected to hold interpersonally and with God. With its function as a religious text, The Oral Torah also presents many civic and religious regulations and observances Jews are expected to follow. These include many dietary laws to Sabbath, festival observance to marital relations, understandings of agricultural practices, and civil claims and damages.

According to Rabbinic Jewish tradition, the Oral Torah was passed down orally in an unbroken chain from generation to generation until its contents were finally committed to writing following the destruction of the Second Temple in 70 CE, when Jewish civilization was faced with an existential threat, by virtue of the dispersion of the Jewish people.

The major repositories of the Oral Torah are the Mishnah, compiled between 200–220 CE by Judah ha-Nasi, and the Gemara, a series of running commentaries and debates concerning the Mishnah, which together form the Talmud, the preeminent text of Rabbinic Judaism. In fact, two "versions" of the Talmud exist: one produced in the Galilee c. 300–350 CE (the Jerusalem Talmud), and a second, more extensive Talmud compiled in Jewish Babylonia c. 450–500 CE (the Babylonian Talmud).

Belief that at least portions of the Oral Torah were transmitted orally from God to Moses on Biblical Mount Sinai during the Exodus from Egypt is a fundamental tenet of faith of Orthodox Judaism, and was recognized as one of the Thirteen Principles of Faith by Maimonides.

There have also been historical dissenters to the Oral Torah, most notably the Sadducees and Karaites, who claimed to derive their religious practice only from the Written Torah. The Beta Israel, isolated from the rest of world Jewry for many centuries, also lacked Rabbinic texts until they immigrated from Ethiopia to Israel in recent years.

== Components of the Oral Torah ==
The term "Oral Torah" should not be understood as a monolith. The Jewish Encyclopedia divides the Oral Torah into eight categories, ranked according to the relative level of authoritativeness, which are found within the Talmud, the Tosefta and the halakhic Midrashim.

1. Explanations of those laws of the written law, which are not fully intelligible without the explanations, and therefore presuppose an oral interpretation. Such explanations are connected in some way with Scripture.
2. Ancient halakhot which have no connection with Scripture and can not be connected with it, thus deriving their authority only from the tradition which ascribes them to Moses on Sinai. (In the case of these two groups, it is impossible to ascertain which elucidations and rules were really given to Moses on Sinai, and which were added later.)
3. Laws found in the prophetic books. Some of these originated at the time of the Prophets; but others are much older, perhaps having been transmitted orally, and committed to writing by the Prophets. They are called also "Dibre Ḳabbalah" (Words of Tradition).
4. Interpretations and regulations defining many written laws, as well as new laws, formulated by the early scribes, beginning with the time of Ezra. These are called also "Dibre Soferim" (Words of the Scribes).
5. Interpretations and regulations covering the written law, as well as new halakhot, which the Tannaim deduced from Scripture by means of hermeneutic rules or by logical conclusions. There are differences of opinion among the scholars in regard to most of these explanations and definitions; but they are of equal weight with the written law, and are called also "Debar Torah" (Regulation of the Torah).
6. Customs and observances ("taḳḳanot") which were introduced at various times by different scholars. They are ascribed partly to Moses, partly to Joshua, but chiefly to the members of the Great Synagogue or the Soferim ("Scribes"), and are called also "Dibre Soferim" ("Words of the Scribes").
7. Statutes and decisions ("gezerot") decreed by the Sanhedrin or court, and generally accepted. Such laws could be abrogated only by another court greater than the first one in numbers and scholarship.
8. Statutes and regulations for which the scholars had no tradition or allusion in Scripture, but which they accepted as standards after deriving them from the customs and laws of the country in which they were living. These are called "Hilkhot Medinah" (Statutes of the Country).

The laws in the last three groups were not considered equal in validity to the written law ("De'oraita"), but were regarded merely as rabbinical regulations ("de-rabbanan").

== Historical development ==
=== Source and transmission ===
According to modern scholarship, the traditions embodied in what later became known as the "Oral Torah" developed over generations among the inhabitants of Judea and Israel and were passed down through various modes of cultural transmission, including but not restricted to oral transmission. It is hypothesized that, sometime prior to the Babylonian exile of 586–530 BCE, in applying the Mosaic code to daily life and Temple worship, "a multitude of usages arising out of practical necessity or convenience or experience became part of the routine of observance of the code, and, in the course of time, shared the sanctity and authority which were inherent in the divinely inspired code itself."

Such practices experienced exponential growth from the time of Ezra to the Romans' destruction of the Second Temple due to the changing social and religious conditions experienced by inhabitants of Judea. Many of these practices were advocated by the Pharisees, a sect of largely lower- and middle-class Jews who stood in opposition to the Sadducees, the priestly caste who dominated the Temple cult. The Sadducees rejected the legitimacy of the pharisaic extra-biblical traditions, as well as increasingly popular notions such as the immortality of the soul and divine intervention. Danby notes the following:

It is a reasonable hypothesis that a result of this controversy—a controversy which continued for two centuries—was a deliberate compilation and justification of the unwritten tradition by the Pharisean party, perhaps unsystematic and on a small scale in the earlier stages, but stimulated and fostered from time to time both by opposition from the Sadducees and by internal controversy (such as, e.g., the disputes between the Houses of Hillel and Shammai) within the ranks of the Pharisees, culminating in the collections of traditional laws (Halakoth) from which the present Mishnah draws its material.

With the destruction of the Second Temple around 70 CE, the Sadducees were divested of their main source of authority, without which their theology could not survive. On the other hand, the Pharisees became the progenitor of the rabbinic class, who formalized the traditions of their predecessors. Following the fall of the Temple, it appears that the Pharisaic leader Johanan ben Zakkai (30–90 CE) settled in Yavneh, where he established a school that came to be regarded by fellow Jews as the successors of the Jerusalem Sanhedrin. Upon this Council of Jabneh fell the duty of administering and interpreting religious law, conserving tradition, and solving problems that arose by the past dependence of numerous observances on the existence of the Temple and priesthood. Thus, from 70 to 130 CE, when the Bar Kochba revolt further decimated the Jewish community, the Oral Law experienced a significant period of development and an unprecedented level of legal and religious authority among the populace.

=== Codification ===
==== The Mishnah ====
The destruction of the Second Temple and the fall of Jerusalem in the first and early second centuries CE devastated the Jewish community. The First Jewish–Roman War of 66–73 CE and the Bar Kokhba revolt cost hundreds of thousands of Jewish lives, the destruction of leading yeshivot, and thousands of scholars and students. At that point, it became apparent that the Hebrew community and its learning were threatened, and that publication was the only way to ensure that the law could be preserved. Thus, around 200 CE, a redaction of the Oral Law in writing was completed. Both Rabbinic tradition and scholarship ascribe this effort to Judah HaNasi. The product of this effort, the Mishnah, is generally considered the first work of rabbinic literature.

"Mishnah" is the name given to the 63 tractates that HaNasi systematically codified, which in turn are divided into six "orders." Unlike the Torah, in which, for example, laws of the Sabbath are scattered throughout the books of Exodus, Leviticus, and Numbers, all the Mishnaic laws of the Sabbath are located in a single tractate called Shabbat. Moreover, the laws contained in the 24 chapters that make up that tractate are far more extensive than those contained in the Torah, reflecting the extensiveness of the Oral Law. Some authority suggests HaNasi made use of as many as 13 separate collections of Halakhot from different schools and time periods, and reassembled that material into a coherent whole, arranged it systematically, summarized discussions, and in some cases rendered his own rulings where alternative traditions existed.

The Mishnah does far more than expound upon and organize the Biblical commandments. Rather, important topics covered by the Mishnah "rest on no scriptural foundations whatsoever," such as portions of the civil law tractates of Bava Kamma, Bava Metzia and Bava Batra. In other words, "To perfect the [Written] Torah, the Oral tradition had to provide for a variety of transactions left without any law at all in Scripture." Just as portions of the Torah reflect (according to the documentary hypothesis) the agenda of the Levite priesthood in centralizing worship in the Temple in Jerusalem and legitimizing their exclusive authority over the sacrificial cult, so too can the Mishnah be seen as reflecting the unique "program" of the Tannaim and their successors to develop an egalitarian form of Judaism with an emphasis on social justice and an applicability throughout the Jewish diaspora. As a result, the Talmud often finds the rabbis combing scripture for textual support to justify existing religious practice, rather than deriving the practice organically from the language of scripture.

==== The Gemara ====
HaNasi's method of codification, in which he often included minority viewpoints and citation by name to rabbis who championed different viewpoints, became a template for the Gemara, a compendium of discussions and commentaries on the Mishnah's laws by generations of leading rabbis during the next four centuries in the two centers of Jewish life, Syria Palaestina or "Judea" and Asoristan or "Babylonia". The Gemara with the Mishnah came to be edited together into compilations known as the Talmud. Both the Babylonian Talmud and the Jerusalem Talmud have been transmitted in written form to the present day, although the more extensive Babylonian Talmud is widely considered to be more authoritative.

The Talmud's discussions follow the order of the Mishnah, although not all tractates are discussed. Generally, a law from the Mishnah is cited, which is followed by a rabbinic deliberation on its meaning. The discussion often, but not always, results in a decision regarding the more persuasive or authoritative position based on available sources or anecdotal evidence. (See Aliba dehilchasa.)

== In Jewish tradition ==
=== Rabbinic thought ===
Rabbinic tradition considers the Oral Law to be of divine origin. The divinity and authoritativeness of the Oral Law as transmitted from God to Moses on Mount Sinai, continues to be accepted by Orthodox and Haredi Judaism as a fundamental precept of Judaism. The Oral Law was the basis for nearly all subsequent rabbinic literature. It is therefore intricately related to the development of Halacha. As such, despite codification, interpretation of the Oral Law is likewise required.

==== Divine source and transmission ====
Rabbis of the Talmudic era conceived of the Oral Torah in two distinct ways. First, Rabbinic tradition saw the Oral Torah as an unbroken chain of transmission. The distinctive feature of this view was that Oral Torah was "conveyed by word of mouth and memorized." Second, the Rabbis also viewed the Oral Torah as an interpretive tradition, and not merely as memorized traditions. They saw the written Torah as containing many levels of interpretation. It was left to later generations, who were steeped in the oral tradition of interpretation, to discover those ("hidden") interpretations not revealed by Moses. Instead, Moses was obligated to impart the explanations orally to students, children, and fellow adults. It was thus forbidden to write and publish the Oral Torah; some rabbis kept private notes of their teaching, but only for their personal convenience.

Jewish tradition identifies the unbroken historical chain of individuals who were entrusted with passing down the Oral Law from Moses to the early rabbinic period: "Moses received the Torah and handed it down to Joshua; Joshua to the Elders; the Elders to the prophets; and the prophets handed it down to the men of the Great Assembly." Similarly, Maimonides provides a generation by generation account of the names of all those in the direct line that transmitted this tradition, beginning with Moses up until Ravina and Rav Ashi, the rabbis who compiled the Babylonian Talmud. The pivotal role of Akiva ben Yosef is discussed in a Talmudic story, when Moses sees Rabbi Akiva (Menachot 29b), which portrays God as preparing the Torah for Akiva's interpretive skills in midrash.

==== The interplay of the Oral and Written Law ====
Rabbinic tradition identifies several characteristics of the Written Law, suggesting the existence of a parallel Oral tradition. Here, the Oral Law must have been disseminated at the same time as the Written Torah because certain Torah commandments would be indecipherable without a separate explanatory codex (and, presumably, God would not demand adherence to commandments that could not be understood). Many terms used in the Torah are left undefined, such as the word totafot, usually translated as "frontlets," which is used three times in the Pentateuch (in Exodus 13:9 and Deuteronomy 6:8 and 11:18) but only identified with tefillin in the Mishnah (see Menachot 3:7).

Similarly, many procedures are mentioned without explanation or instructions, or assume familiarity on the part of the reader. For example, the discussion of shechita (kosher slaughter) in Deuteronomy 12 states "you shall kill of your herd and of your flock which God Lord has given you, as I have commanded you," without any clear indication of what had been "commanded"; only in the Oral Torah are the various requirements of ritual slaughter explicated. Similarly, Deuteronomy 24 discusses the laws of divorce in passing; these laws are set forth with great specificity in the Mishnah and Gemara. Another example: the blue string of tekhelet on the tzitzit is to be dyed with an extraction from what scholars believe to be a snail; a detail only spoken of in the oral Torah. For other examples and further discussion here see Kuzari 3:35.

Moreover, according to the rabbinic view, without an Oral Law, blind adherence to the plain text of certain Torah commandments would cause the practitioner to violate a commandment elsewhere in the Torah or could lead to unethical acts, and thus, a priori, a set of supplementary "instructions" must have been provided. A classic example involves the phrase "An eye for an eye, a tooth for a tooth, a hand for a hand, a foot for a foot" Ex 21:22–27 is held in the oral tradition to imply monetary compensation – as opposed to a literal Lex talionis. Note also that the interpretation as "monetary compensation" is borne out by Num 35:30–31, implying that only in the case of murder is Lex talionis applied (per logic of following paragraph).

The Oral Torah is similarly needed to explain commandments - as well as actions of biblical actors - seemingly discordant with other verses. For example, the marriage of Boaz to Ruth (Ruth 4:8–9) appears on its face to contradict the prohibition of against marrying Moabites (Deuteronomy 23:3–4); however, the Oral Torah explains that this prohibition is limited to Moabite men. Similarly, the rabbinic practice for the Counting of the Omer (Leviticus 23:15–16) is at odds with the Karaite practice, which appears to accord with a more literal reading of these verses, but is in fact borne out by Joshua 5:10–12.

Re the preceding paragraph, note that much Talmudic analysis demonstrates how the Mishnah's rulings, and / or disputes, in fact derive from — and are hence consistent with — the much earlier Biblical texts; see Gemara § Biblical exposition. Relatedly, the 1st century Targum Onkelos is largely consistent with the oral tradition as recorded in the midrash, redacted into writing only in the 3rd or 4th century.

Complementary to the above textual and internal evidence, archaeologists have uncovered also physical evidence relating to religious rituals and practices which were current prior to the codification of the Mishnah; from which, it can be inferred that Judah HaNasi and his contemporaries recorded, rather than innovated, normative Judaism as practiced during the 1st century CE and prior. For example, excavations at Qumran (Cave 4) have yielded specimens of tefillin and parchment scrolls which reflect later Talmudic discussion. Likewise, the structure and placement of ritual baths at Masada appears to be consistent with the rabbinic requirements per the Mishnaic tractate Mikvaot, although they were constructed approximately 120 years before the Mishnah was compiled. A clay seal discovered in Jerusalem in 2011 is consistent with the tradition recorded in tractate Shekalim chapter 5. The Elephantine papyri include a "Passover letter" (419 BCE) which already included many of the Pesach observances of today, and the first known text of a Ketubah (about 440 BCE). The Qumran Halachic Letter, which records approximately a dozen disputes regarding the application of halakha, also testifies to the evolutionary process of the Oral Law.

==== In rabbinic literature and commentary ====
The Oral Law's fundamental connection to the written Law, as evident in its initial "recording" in the Midrash and Talmud, is reflected in subsequent rabbinic works - particularly those discussed below - which draw on and reinforce this relationship. Here, the midrash provides a verse-by-verse discussion of the entire Tanakh, thereby recording both aggadic and halakhic tradition. Similarly, the Talmud reports in detail (mainly legal) discussion and analyses of the written Torah. (Although the discussion does not proceed verse-wise as with the Midrash - the structure is provided by the Mishnah - it is linked to the relevant verse(s) in almost all cases.)

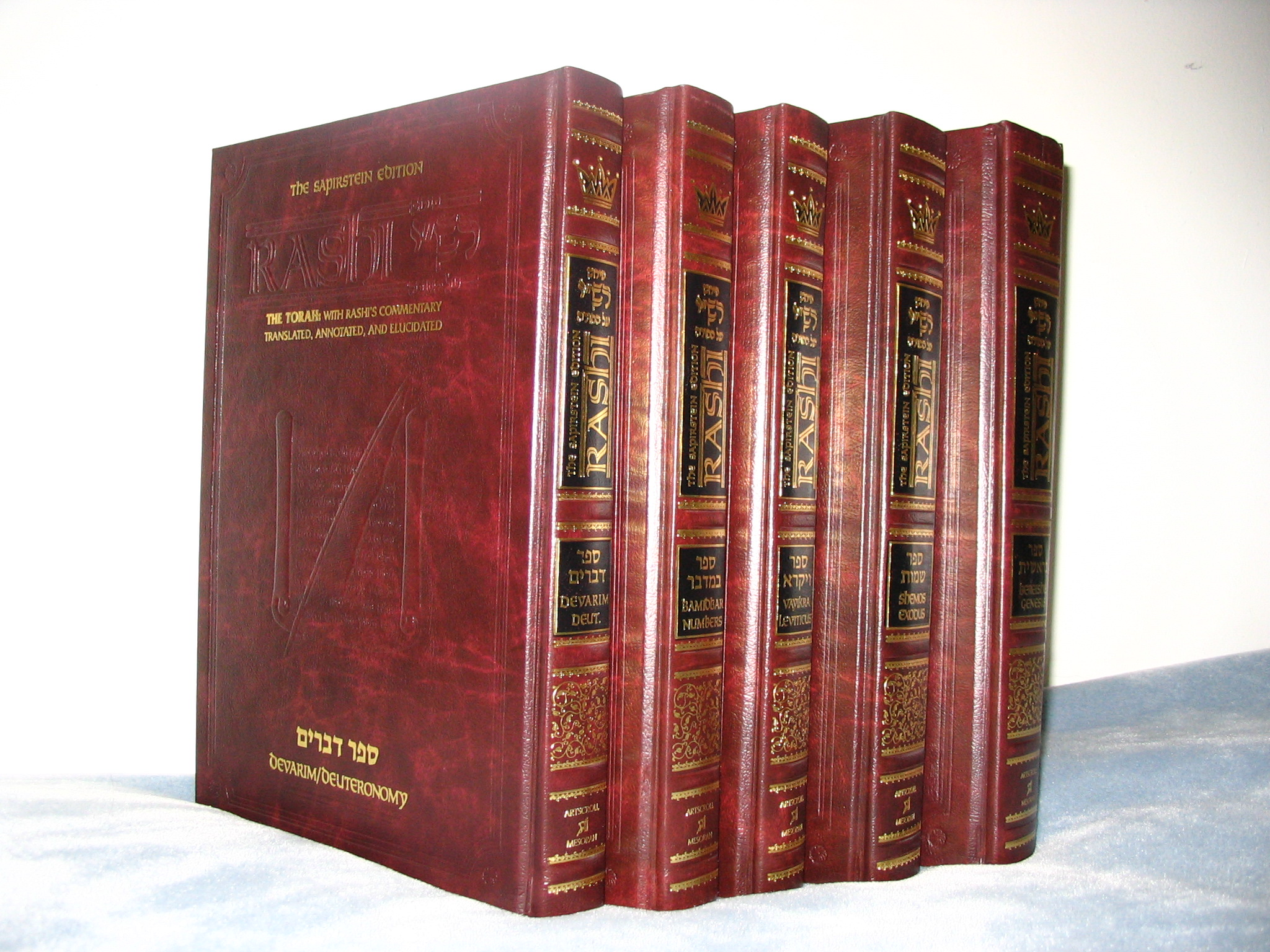
A modern translation of Rashi's commentary on the Chumash, published by Artscroll

Early Rabbinic literature builds on these works, where - reflecting the relationship as outlined - discussion of the Written Law is in light of the Oral Law. The era of the Rishonim sees the Oral Law incorporated into the first formal Torah commentaries, where the biblical text is discussed and / or analysed based on the various Midrashic and Talmudic traditions. The chief of these is perhaps Rashi's commentary on Tanakh. This work clarifies the "simple" meaning of the text, by addressing questions implied by the wording or verse or paragraph structure, by drawing on the Midrashic, Talmudic and Aggadic literature. It has given rise to numerous counter- (e.g., Ramban) and super-commentaries (e.g., Mizrachi), all similarly drawing on the Oral Torah, and widely studied to this day (see Mikraot Gedolot, Yeshiva § Torah and Bible study).

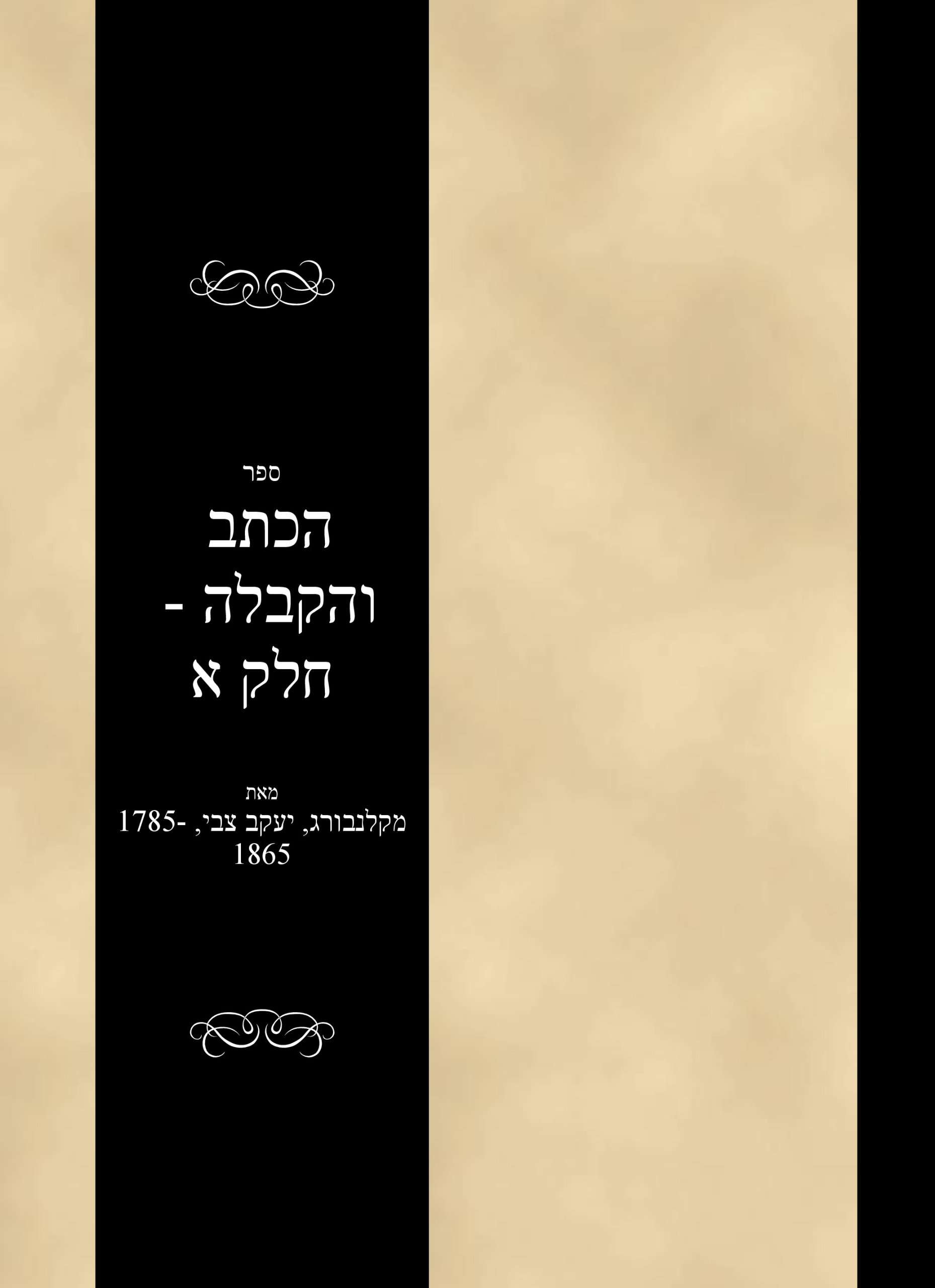
Yaakov Tzvi Mecklenburg's Haketav VeHaKabbalah deals with the relationship between the written and oral Torah.

In more recent Acharonic times, several (Orthodox) commentaries have been produced, which, in some sense, reverse the direction of the analysis. These originated in response to the (erstwhile) challenges of haskalah and Biblical criticism, and were intended "to demonstrate the indivisibility of the written Torah and its counterpart, the oral Torah", and in so doing, "showing the organic relationship between the Written Law and the Oral Law", often in the light of the above. Given this purpose, these provide a further detailed and explicit analysis here. The main of these:

- Ha'amek Davar ("Delve into the matter") on Torah, and Davar Ha'amek on Nevi'im and Ketuvim, by Naftali Zvi Yehuda Berlin, the "Netziv"
- Haketav VehaKabbalah ("The Written [Torah] and the [Oral] Tradition") on Torah, by Yaakov Tzvi Mecklenburg
- HaTorah vehaMitzva ("The Torah and the Commandment") by Meïr Leibush, the "Malbim", covers all of Tanakh except Kohelet and Eicha.
- Uebersetzung und Erklärung des Pentateuchs ("Translation and Commentary of the Pentateuch") by Samson Raphael Hirsch.
- Torah Temimah ("The Perfect Torah") on Torah, by Baruch Epstein.

Contemporaneous with, and complementary to these commentaries, were specific, monograph-like works discussing the Oral Torah in concept and historically, as following. These had been preceded by two earlier (less modern) discussions: Maimonides' Introduction to the Mishnah — dealing with the nature of the Oral Law, the distinction between the prophet and the sage, and the organizational structure of the Mishnah; and Isaiah Horowitz's Introduction to the Oral Torah in part 2 of his Shenei Luchot HaBerit. These works are:

- Dor Dor v'Dor'shav ("Each generation and its Scholars"), by Rabbi Isaac Hirsch Weiss, a five volume history of the Oral aw, Halakha and Aggada, from Biblical times until the composition of the Shulchan Aruch.
- Mevo Hatalmud ("Introduction to the Talmud") and Torat Neviim ("Teachings of the Prophets"), by Rabbi Zvi Hirsch Chajes. The first, a detailed history and classification of the Talmud and its underlying oral tradition, formulating the nature, extent, and authority of tradition. The second, treatises on the authority of Talmudic tradition, and on the organic structure and methodology of the Talmud.
- Die Erste Mishna (The First Mishna), a historical and linguistic analysis of the Mishna by David Zvi Hoffmann, positing an early, uniform, undisputed, and therefore authoritative collection of the Oral Law. (R. Hoffmann also authored a Torah commentary addressing some of the same issues as those mentioned.)
- Matteh Dan (or Kuzari Hasheini; London 1714) written by Rabbi David Nieto demonstrates the authority of the Oral Law, and defends the tradition against attacks by Karaites and skeptics.
- Several works by Rabbi Immanuel Aboab, especially his Nomologia, defend the traditional law and discuss its chronology.

Other major works discussing the Bible as based on the Oral Torah, and drawing on their interrelationship, include:

- El Conciliador ("The Conciliator"), by Rabbi Menasseh Ben Israel, a work written to reconcile the apparent contradictions in numerous passages throughout the Bible by utilizing "an astounding range of sources", primarily the Talmud and the classic Jewish commentaries. It was written in Spanish, in Amsterdam, 1632, primarily to strengthen the faith of the Marranos.
- Weiss' Dor Dor v'Dor'shav similarly discusses apparent divergencies in the Pentateuch and the various books of the Prophets.
- Me'am Lo'ez, begun by Rabbi Yaakov Culi in 1730, a detailed explanation of each chapter of the Torah, explaining it from "countless approaches", especially according to the Midrash and Talmud; also discusses the relevant Halacha as based on the Shulchan Aruch and Mishneh Torah. The work was intended as a "compendium" of the major fields of Torah study, for the Ladino-speaking community.
- The recent Da'at Miqra, a voluminous Bible commentary combining a traditional outlook with the findings of modern research and archeology, and implicitly addressing biblical criticism. Here, see also Mordechai Breuer § Literary contribution, Umberto Cassuto § Origins of the Pentateuch, and the work Da'at Sofrim by Chaim Dov Rabinowitz.

=== Dissenting viewpoints ===
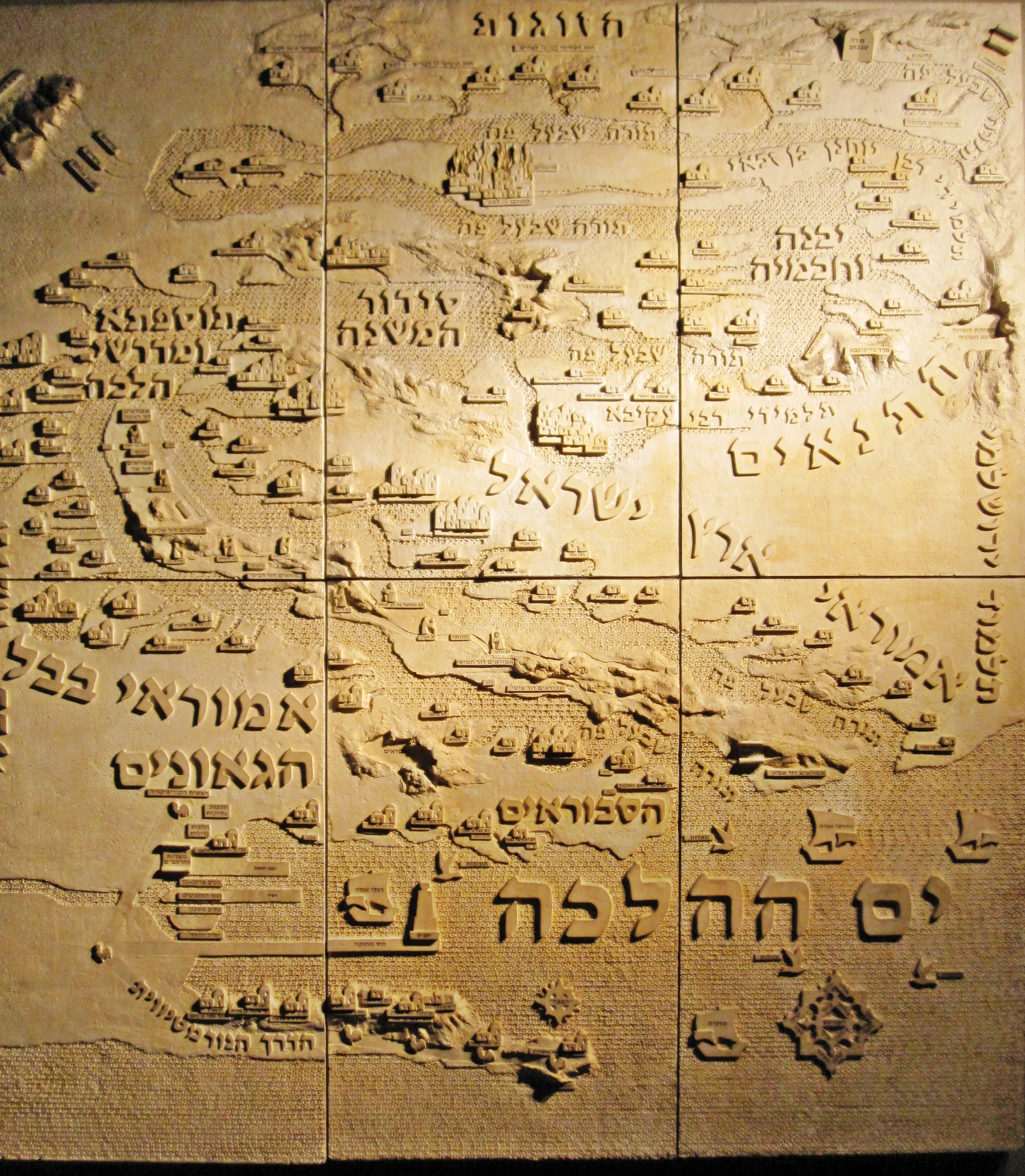
A relief depicting the development of the Oral Law at Diaspora Museum, Tel Aviv

From the Second Temple era, there has always been some level of opposition to the concept of a "Dual Torah" within the umbrella of Judaism, although today only the small Karaite sect formally opposes the incorporation of any extra-biblical law into their practice.

==== Sadducees ====
Sadducees rejected the Pharisaic oral traditions. They based their interpretations on their own traditions emphasizing a more literal understanding of the verses. In many respects, this led to a more severe observance than that of the Pharisees especially as regards purity laws and temple practice. Most aspects of Sadduceean law and methods of interpretation are not known.

==== Essenes ====
Essenes, a monastic group of people, had a "monastic organization". Though they had non-biblical rules and customs, they differened significantly from the mainstream Rabbinic tradition.

==== Samaritans ====
The Samaritans, an ancient sect that has survived in small numbers to the present day, have their own rich interpretative tradition, as reflected in the Medieval Samaritan legal collection called the Hilukh, which shares etymological roots with the term Halakhah. However, the concept of a divinely ordained Oral Law having equal value with the written one is foreign to Samaritan theology.

==== Karaites ====
Karaite Judaism or Karaism is a Jewish denomination that began in eighth century Baghdad to form a separate sect that rejected of the Oral Torah and Talmud, and placed sole reliance on the Tanakh as scripture. Thus, for example, Karaites understood Exodus 35:3 ("Do not light a fire in any of your dwellings on the Sabbath day") as forbidding the use of any kind of fire on the Sabbath, including fires lit before the start of the Sabbath, which are permitted by the Oral Law. Karaites also do not adhere to widespread customs such as the donning of tefillin and the prohibition against eating milk and meat together on the grounds that such practices are grounded in the Oral Law.

==== The Reform Movement ====
Influenced by the Haskalah, and under sociological pressure to assimilate to the Protestant and secular culture of European and North American urban elites, Reform Judaism came to reject the binding authority of the Oral Torah and systematically stripped its liturgy and practices of Rabbinic tradition.

=== Modern perspectives ===
==== Torat Eretz Yisrael ====
According to Torat Eretz Yisrael and Minhagei Eretz Yisrael, it is important to notice that Torah sages can err, just as the Sanhedrin could (Leviticus 4:13).

==== Conservative Judaism ====
Conservative Judaism takes an intermediate approach between the Reform Movement and Orthodoxy, claiming that the Oral tradition is entitled to authority, but regarding its rulings as flexible guidelines rather than immutable precepts, that may be viewed through the lens of modernity. Jewish scholar and philosopher Ismar Schorsch has postulated that Conservative Judaism is tied to "sensing divinity both in the Torah and in the Oral Law," but not in a literalist manner. Rabbi Zecharias Frankel, considered intellectual founder of Conservative Judaism, was respected by many Orthodox until writing in 1859 that the Talmudic term "Law given to Moses at Sinai" always meant ancient customs accepted as such. His opponents demanded that he issue an unequivocal statement of belief in the total divinity of Oral Law, yet he refrained from doing so. He was consequently ostracized and declared a heretic by several authorities.

== See also ==
- Aggadah
- Hadith
- Law given to Moses at Sinai
- Oral tradition
- Oral history
- Oral law
- Traditional Jewish chronology
- Traditional knowledge
- Uncodified constitution
