= Simon Habillo =

Rabbi and author

Simon ben Judah ben David Ḥabillo (Hebrew: שמעון בן יהודה בן דוד חביליו, romanized: Shimʻon ben Yehudah ben David Ḥabilyo; fl. mid-17th century) was a rabbi of Hebron.

He was a contemporary of Moses Zacuto, who approved his works. Ḥabillo was the author of Ḥebel ben Yehudah, a commentary on the Passover Haggadah (Mantua, 1694), and Ḥeleḳ Yehudah (Venice, 1695), a commentary on Ruth, published together with the text. The last-named work is preceded by a prayer of Ḥabillo arranged in the style of Psalm 119.
