= Menachot =

Mishnah and Talmud tractate

Tractate Menachot (Hebrew: מְנָחוֹת; "Meal Offerings") is the second tractate of the Order of Kodashim. It has Gemara in the Babylonian Talmud and a Tosefta.

Menachot deals with the rules regarding the preparation and presentation of grain-meal, oil, and drink offerings, including the meal-offering that was burnt on the altar and the remainder that was consumed by the priests as specified in the Torah (Lev 2:1 and on); the bringing of the omer of barley (Lev 23:10), the two loaves (Lev 23:17), and the showbread (Lev 24:5).as offerings in the Temple in Jerusalem. The tractate also draws upon verses in Numbers chapters 5, 6, 28, and 29.

== Summary ==
The thirteen chapters of the Mishnah tractate cover the following topics:

=== Unfit offerings (pasul and piggul) ===
- 1. Intention to make an offering valid. Omissions that invalidate the offering, such as a time frame that cause a piggul. Taking the grain handful ("ḳometz") The incense.
- 2. Further details concerning pasul and piggul.
- 3. How a meal-offering remains kosher or becomes pasul. How other things are rendered invalid, such as the sections of the Torah in a mezuzah or in tefillin.

=== Mode of sacrifice ===
- 4. More ways to cause pasul status. Israelites in the wilderness sacrificed and consecrated the altar, table, and candlesticks. Meal-offering of the high priest.
- 5. Preparation of the meal-offerings, Additional ingredients. Offerings brought near the altar ("haggashah") and offerings waved ("tenufah").
- 6. Offerings from which only a handful is taken. Offerings that are placed entire upon the altar.
- 7. The thanksgiving offering ("todah") and the offering of the Nazarites. Measures that changed, and the "Jerusalem" measure as one-sixth larger than the old "midbari" (from the desert) measure.
- 8. Materials for different meal-offerings, such as places for the best flour and the best oil. Where the best wine was found and how it was tested.
- 9. Measures used in the Temple for flour, oil, and wine. Drink-offerings. Sacrifices for which drink-offerings were required. Laying of hands upon a sacrificial animal ("semicha").

=== Wave-offering ===
- 10. Omer offering or wave offering, including timing, source, ceremony, and its offering. The law introduced by R. Yohanan ben Zakkai after the destruction of the Temple.
- 11. The pentecostal bread and the showbread, including the distribution of it among the priests.
- 12. Exemption from meal- and drink-offerings. Offerings without exemptions. Vows (nedarim) of meat- and drink-offerings.

=== Intention for offerings ===
- 13. Vows of offerings that are not strictly defined. Prohibitions on offerings regarding the temple of Onias and its priests. The conclusion of the chapter and of the treatise runs: "It is immaterial whether one sacrifices much or little so long as his mind is intent on God."

=== Order of the chapters ===
As noted by Singer and Lauterbach, "The order given above is that of the editions of the Mishnah and of many manuscripts of the Talmud (compare the observation of R. Bezalel Ashkenazi at the end of the Shiṭṭah Meḳubbeẓet on Menaḥot, in the Vilna edition of the Talmud, p.109b). On the other hand, all the printed editions of the Talmud have the chapter beginning "R. Ishmael," given above as the tenth, in the sixth place, the remaining chapters occurring in the order given above."

== Notable passages ==
=== Tosefta ===
The Tosefta (13:18-22) discusses greed and violence done by the priests, which is said to have contributed to the destruction of the Second Temple, due to baseless hatred.

=== Jerusalem Talmud ===
There is no Jerusalem Talmud gemara on tractate Menaḥot, though the medieval Tosafot mentions a passage that is found in tractate Yoma of the Yerushalmi. (109b, s.v. nizdamen).

=== Babylonian Talmud ===
Besides the main topics, summarized above, the Talmud contains noteworthy deliberations and narratives on other matters, such as:

Chapter 3: Scribal guidelines for Hebrew letters and for writing Torah, mezuzah, and tefillin parchments.

29b: A notable sugya is the homiletical narrative when Moses sees Rabbi Akiva. It begins with Moses finding God putting calligraphy "crowns" on the letters of the Torah, for the sake of Rabbi Akiva. Moses then sees Akiva as a teacher and as a martyr due to Roman persecution. This sugya has intrigued contemporary Jewish studies scholars.

Chapter 4: Includes a discussion of tzitzit.

53a-b: A sugya with the style of R. Ezra's midrash aggadah, with the notion that God was justified before Abraham for the destruction of the Temple and the exile to Babylonia. Compares the people of Israel to an olive-tree.

99b: The attitude of Rabbi Ishmael toward Hellenism.

109b: A sugya about the origin of the temple of Onias. Jacob Zallel Lauterbach and Isidore Singer drew attention to its concluding episode:

At the hour of his death the high priest Simon the Just appointed his younger but learned son Onias to be his successor. Onias renounced his claim in favor of his elder brother Shimei. Onias, however, secretly grudged him his position and endeavored to supplant him. Consequently when Shimei, who was inexperienced in the priestly service, asked Onias to instruct him in its duties, the latter misled him into putting on a woman's cap and girdle to officiate in, and then told the priests that Shimei had promised his beloved to officiate in her cap and girdle on the day of his installation in office. When the priests threatened to kill Shimei for thus trifling with the service, he told them how the matter really stood. Thereupon the priests sought the death of Onias, but he fled to Egypt and there built his temple.

110a: The gemara ends on a positive note, as is common with Talmudic tractates, by discussing the reputation of the Jewish community among other nations, their awareness of God, and positive attributes of Torah scholars. For example, Rabbi Yohanan says that studying the halakhah (rabbinic law) is as worthy as conducting the offerings in the Temple, which is the subject of this tractate. For the last mishnah, the gemara comments on whether God needs sacrifices and offerings.
