= Yaakov Tzvi Mecklenburg =

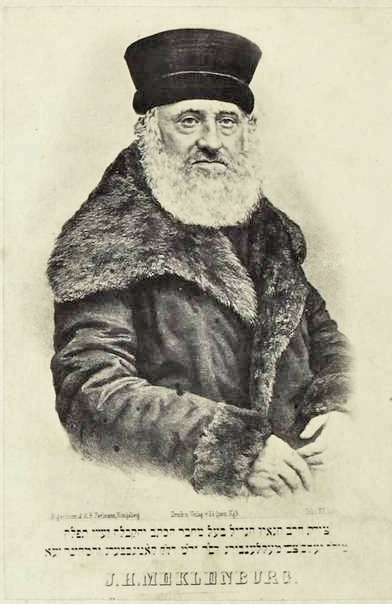
Yaakov Zvi Meklenburg. Assumed to be a commercially produced reproduction, Germany, c. last quarter of the nineteenth century

Yaakov Tzvi Mecklenburg (יעקב צבי מקלנבורג) was an Ashkenazi rabbi and scholar of the 19th century, best known as author of the Torah commentary Hakketav Vehakkabbalah (Haksav Vehakaboleh).

== Biography ==
He was born in 1785 (5545 in the Hebrew calendar) in Lissa (Leszno), in the province of Posen, Germany, in the family of Rabbi Gamliel. At the time, Lissa was a famous center of Torah studies, and Mecklenburg began studying Torah as a student of the local Rav, Zechariah Mendel, a friend and correspondent of Rabbi Akiva Eger. Zechariah Mendel was the son of David Tebla, the previous Rav of Lissa.

R. Mecklenburg initially thereafter went into business. In 1831, at the age of 46, following commercial difficulties, he decided to quit business and was offered the rabbinical position in the city of Königsberg, East Prussia. At that time, Königsberg Jews were under the increasing influence of the Haskalah, a reform movement, which Yaakov Tzvi Mecklenburg strongly opposed. Together with the Malbim, he publicly opposed Reform Judaism's 1844 Braunschweig convention. In the same period, he wrote Haketav VehaKabbalah, his own commentary to the Torah.

He served as Rabbi in Königsberg, for the rest of his life, for 34 years (1831–65). Before his death, he ordered that no eulogies be given at his funeral. In his will, he requested that Haketav VehaKabbalah be read after the public Torah reading, during the first 30 days of mourning.

In the opinion of others, Rabbi Yaakov Tzvi studied directly under Rabbi Akiva Eiger. He mentions in his Haketav VehaKabbaleh Rabbi A. Eiger a few times as 'my Mentor and Teacher'. Example: In Leviticus 27:32, he states: I asked my Mentor and Teacher Rabbi Akiva Eger, etc.

== Works ==
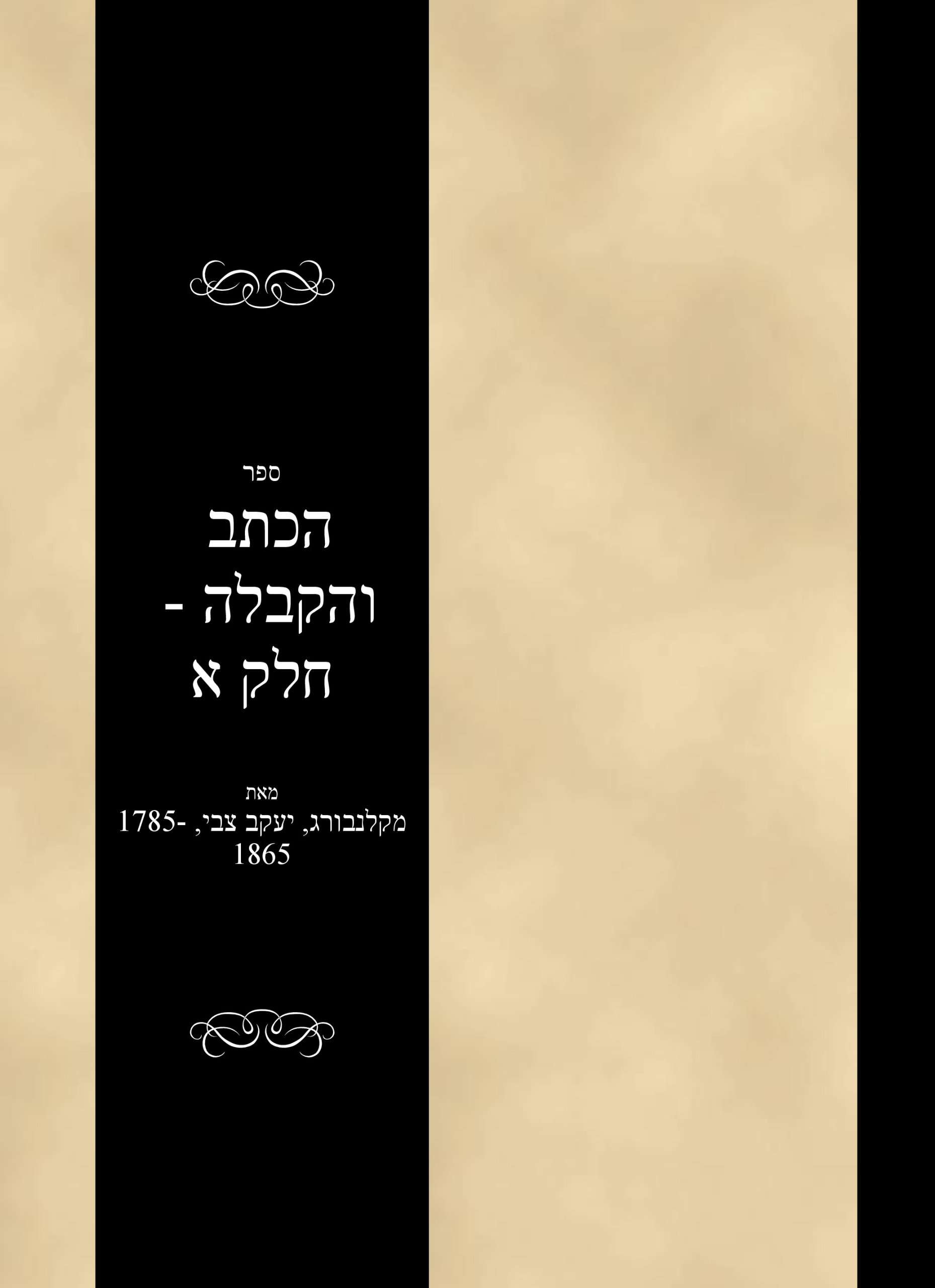
A modern edition of Haketav VehaKabbalah.

Haketav VehaKabbalah (alt. HaKsav VeHaKabalah; Heb. הכתב והקבלה: The Written [Torah] and the [Oral] Tradition) was first published in 1839. Mecklenburg's intent was "to demonstrate the indivisibility of the written Torah and its counterpart, the oral Torah”. His explanations thus connect the literal meaning (peshat) to the hidden meaning (derash), focusing on the traditional Jewish sources (the Mishna, the Talmud, and the Midrash). The commentary draws on that of the Vilna Gaon and Shadal and occasionally includes contemporary non-traditional sources such as Julius Fürst and the Biurists. See Oral Torah#In rabbinic literature and commentary.

Other works include:

- Iyun Tefillah - a commentary on the Siddur, usually coupled with Derech HaChaim written by R. Yaakov Lorberbaum of Lisa.
- Hishtapchut HaNefesh - viduy (confessional prayers) for the eve of Yom Kippur.
