= Isaiah Bakish =

Rabbi of Spanish origin

Isaiah Bakish (Hebrew: ר׳ ישעיה בקיש c. 1545 – c. 1620 fl. 1580s – 1620s) was a rabbi of spanish descent.

He was dayan (judge) in the Beth Din (rabbinical court) of Fez. His writings deal with takkanot (sing. takkanah), exegesis and kabbalah. Some of the Rav's exegesis writings have been published.

== The Kabbalist ==
Kabbalistic writings of Bakish were included in manuscript compilations containing also quotes from famous Kabbalists such as: Nahmanides (Ramban, R’ Moshe ben Nahman Gerondi); Rabbi Isaac Luria (R’ Ari zal); Rabbi Hayyim ben Joseph Vital; R’ Abraham Azulai. The microfilmed collections of the National Library of Israel in Jerusalem contain several of these manuscripts or microfilm manuscripts from other libraries.

In his work on Kabbalah in North Africa since the 16th c., Moshé Hallamish mentioned Isaiah Bakish. In his Shorshei Hashemot the Italian Kabbalist Moses ben Mordecai Zacuto included long quotations of the R' Isaiah Bakish (16-17th c.).

== Works ==
- פסקי דינים ושו״ת Piskei dinim wéchout (sheelot vé tchouvot, c. 1610).
- (fr., heb.) קטעים Fragments (1992).
- (fr., heb.) Rabbi Yesha’ya Bakish (2022. Edition Hillel Bakis), Sur l’œuvre de Rabbi Yesha’ya Bakish: Un des premiers "a’haronim" parmi les sages de Castille au Maroc v. 1545-v. 1620 : Tome 5.1- Fragments. Ecrits juridiques, 424 p.

== Bibliography ==
- (heb.) Natanel Avital (2016-7/5777), 'Hakhmey Castilla, 417 p, Maguen Avot, Jérusalem, pp. 20; 25; 32.
- (heb.) Eliyahou Bakis (5784), Biographical article and publications of 'hidushim of Rabbi Yesha'ya Bakish. Ohr hama'arav, 29, pp. 98-105, Bene Yisakhar Institute, Jerusalem.
- (fr.) Hillel Bakis,Rabbi Ichaya Bakish. Un rabbin-juge marocain (16e-17e siècles), p. 1-40; in Ichaya Bakish, Fragments, 132 p., Editions Bakish, imprimé à Kiriat Ata, Israël, 1992.
- (fr.) Hillel Bakis,Interpréter la Torah. Traditions et méthodes rabbiniques, p. 139-140 et 253, Institut R' Yesha'ya Bakish, Editions Bakish, Montpellier, 2013. 294 p.
- (fr.) Hillel Bakis, Pour lire les Psaumes. Etude de l’Alphabéta (Ps. 119). Texte. Phonétique et rythme. Nouvelle traduction. Commentaires. Abrégé grammatical, see p. 36, 37, 71, 86, 212, 161 (Editions Bakish, X-294 p., Montpellier, 2014).
- (fr./heb.) Hillel Bakis, Traces manuscrites de l'œuvre de Rabbi Yesha'ya Bakish זצ"ל : un des premiers A'haronim parmi les Sages de Castille au Maroc (v. 1545-v. 1620), ebook, Institut Rabbi Yécha'ya, Editions Bakish, 602 pages, 2020, décembre.
- (fr./heb.) Hillel Bakis, Traces imprimées de l'œuvre de Rabbi Yesha'ya Bakish זצ"ל : un des premiers A'haronim parmi les Sages de Castille au Maroc (v. 1545-v. 1620), ebook, Institut Rabbi Yécha'ya, Editions Bakish, 476 pages, 3e éd. Avril 2021.
- (fr./heb.) Hillel Bakis, Traces digitales de l'œuvre de Rabbi Yesha'ya Bakish זצ"ל : un des premiers A'haronim parmi les Sages de Castille au Maroc (v. 1545-v. 1620), ebook, Institut Rabbi Yécha'ya, Editions Bakish, 352 pages, Juin 2021.
- (heb.) Yossef Ben Naïm, R', Sépher malké rabbanan, Jérusalem, 1931. p. 62, 79.
- (fr.) Arrik Delouya, Les Juifs du Maroc: bibliographie générale : résumés, annotations, recensions. Librairie orientaliste Paul Geuthner, Paris, 2001.
- (heb.) Moshé Hallamish, חלמיש, משה - הקבלה בצפון אפריקה למן המאה הט"ז : סקירה היסטורית ותר, Tel-Aviv, Hakibbutz Haméouhad, 2001 (see p. 43; 119; 184–185).
- (es.) Abraham I. Larédo, 'Las Taqanot de los expulsados de Castiila en Marruccosy su régimen matrimonial y sucesoral', in Sefarad, pp. 243–276; instituto Arias Montano, Madrid-Barcelona, 1948.
- (heb.) David Obadia, R', Fès vehachmia, Kronikot Mkoriot, Jérusalem, 1978–1979.
- (heb.) Chim’on Ouanonou, Erez Halébanone, vol. 3, p. 1357, 1999.
- D. S. Sasoon & David Ohel, Descriptive catalogue of the Hebrew and Samaritan manuscripts in the Sassoon Library. Oxford, 1932, 2 vols
- (heb.) Ya'akob Moshé Toledano, R', Ner ha ma’arabi, Jérusalem, 1911. see p. 74, 75 et 104.
- (fr.) Haïm Zafrani, Les Juifs du Maroc. Vie sociale, économique et religieuse. Études de Taqqanot et Responsa, Geuthner, Paris, 332 p, 1972.
