= Baraita on the Thirty-two Rules =

Hermeneutical tool for biblical interpretation

The Baraita on the Thirty-two Rules or Baraita of R. Eliezer ben Jose ha-Gelili (Hebrew: ברייתא דל"ב מידות) is a baraita giving 32 hermeneutic rules, or middot, for interpreting the Bible. As of when the Jewish Encyclopedia was published in 1901–1906, it was thought to no longer exist except in references by later authorities. However, it was discovered in 1933 by H. G. Enelow, who published it in his "Mishnat Rabbi Eliezer," and in 1947 it was published again in Margaliot's edition of Midrash Hagadol to Genesis.

Jonah ibn Janah is the oldest authority who drew upon this Baraita, but he did not mention it by name. Rashi makes frequent use of it in his commentaries on the Bible. It is mentioned in the commentary attributed Rashi in the Talmud, Horayot 3b. He either briefly calls it the thirty-two rules or designates it as the "Baraita (or sections [pirkei]) of R. Eliezer b. Jose ha-Gelili". Also the Karaite Judah Hadassi, who incorporated it in his Eshkol ha-Kofer, recognized in it the work of this R. Eliezer.

== Authorship ==
Prior to its discovery, knowledge of the Baraita was gathered only from the recension transmitted in the methodological work Keritot, by Samson of Chinon. The beginning of the Baraita in this recension reads as follows: "Whenever you come across the words of R. Eliezer b. Jose ha-Gelili, make a funnel of your ear." Though this sentence already existed in the Baraita as known to Hadassi, it is naturally a later addition taken from the Talmud; but it shows that the Baraita of the Thirty-two Rules was early regarded as the work of Eliezer b. Jose ha-Gelili. There are strong grounds for the supposition that the opening sentence of the Baraita ran: "R. Eliezer, the son of R. Jose the Galilean, said." This is the reading of Joshua ha-Levi and Isaiah Horowitz; and it is believed that the name of the author did not drop out until the addition of the sentence from the Talmud. Consequently, no adequate reasons exist for doubting the authorship of R. Eliezer. Moshe Zucker sought to prove, from Geniza documents, that the Baraita of the 32 Rules was written by Shemuel b. Hofni Gaon (d. 1013) as part of the introduction to his commentary to the Torah. This conclusion has been challenged by A. Greenbaum.

Distinction must, however, be made between two different constituent elements of the Baraita. The enumeration of the 32 hermeneutic rules in the first section constitutes the real Baraita as composed by R. Eliezer; and the explanations of each rule in the following 32 sections form, as it were, a gemara to the real Baraita. In these 32 sections sayings are cited of the tannaim R. Akiva, R. Ishmael, R. Jose, R. Nehemiah, R. Nehorai, Rebbi, Ḥiyyah, and of the amoraim Johanan and Jose b. Ḥanina. Although these names (especially the last two) show that portions of the Baraita were interpolated long after Eliezer b. Jose, no general conclusions may be drawn from it with regard to the whole work.

The terminology is prevailingly tannaitic, even in the second portion. W. Bacher correctly remarks that the exclusively tannaitic expression "zeker le-dabar" is found at the end of section 9. The second part, therefore, leaving later interpolations out of consideration, may also have sprung from the tannaitic period, probably from the school of R. Eliezer. It is noteworthy that the old scholars make citations from the Baraita that are not found in its present form, thus casting a doubt upon the correctness of the present recension.

According to modern scholar Moshe Zucker, this work was in fact only written in the 10th century.

== Hermeneutics ==
The 32 rules are those applied in aggadic interpretations (הגדה is the right reading and not התורה). This entirely characterizes the method of the Baraita; for although it incorporates the most important halakhic rules of interpretation, which originated in the schools of R. Akiva and of R. Ishmael (Hillel), the Baraita deals principally with the syntax, style, and subject-matter of the Bible. Such treatment is of first importance for the interpretation of the Scriptures; but in halakhah it is of subordinate value. The Baraita, then, written about 150 CE, may be regarded as the earliest work on Biblical hermeneutics, since Philo's fantastic allegories can hardly be regarded as such.

Following are two examples from the Baraita, which illustrate its method.

- Section 9 (on the elliptical phraseology of the Bible) says: "I Chronicles 17:5 reads, 'I have gone from tent to tent, and from tabernacle' ('u-mimishkan'). It should read: 'and from tabernacle to tabernacle' ('u-mimishkan el mishkan'); but the Bible here employs ellipsis."
- Section 21 says that sometimes a clause that ought to stand at the end of sentences, conveying one idea, is interposed between them. Thus, the correct place for Psalms 34:17 would be after 34:18. According to the last rule, whole chapters of the Bible should be transferred. Thus, Genesis 15 chronologically precedes Genesis 14.

These examples show that in Palestine scholars early began to devote themselves to a rational Bible exegesis, although free play was at the same time yielded to aggadic interpretation.

== Jewish Encyclopedia bibliography ==
- W. Bacher, Agada der Tannaiten, ii. 293–298;
- Bloch, in Kobak's Jeschurun, ix. 47-58 (a polemic against a treatise by A. Berliner on the Baraita. This treatise is not mentioned by name, and is not otherwise known to the writer of the present article);
- Wolf Einhorn, Sefer Midrash Tannaim, 1838 (an extract from this work occurs in his introduction to his commentary on Rabbah, Wilna, 1878);
- A. Hildesheimer, in the Supplement to the third Program of the Rabbinical College of *Eisenstadt, 1869;
- Katzenellenbogen, Netibot 'Olam, 1st ed., 1822, and 2d ed., with annotations by Mattityahu Strashun and Samuel Strashun, 1858;
- Königsberger, in Monatsblätter für Vergangenheit und Gegenwart, 1890–91, pp. 3–10, 90–94, and the Hebrew Supplement, pp. 1–16;
- Reifmann, Meshib Dabar, 1866.
