= Law given to Moses at Sinai =

Halakhic law with no biblical reference or source

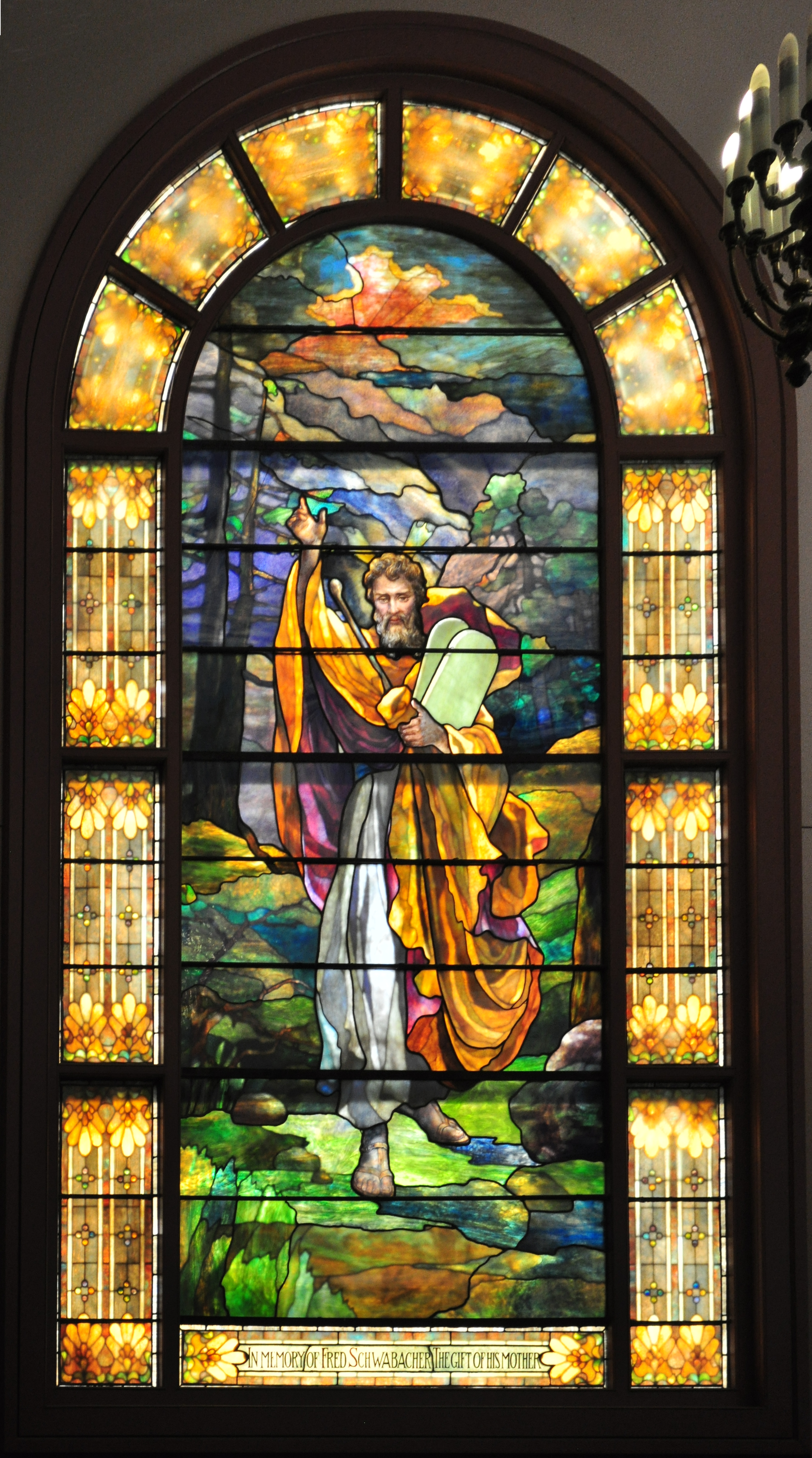
Moses with the Tablets of the Law on Sinai (stained glass from the Temple De Hirsch Sinai)

A law given to Moses at Sinai (Hebrew: הלכה למשה מסיני, romanized: Halakhah le-Moshe mi-Sinai) refers to a halakhic law for which there is no biblical reference or source, but rather it was passed down orally as a teaching originating from Moses at Sinai. Such teachings have not been derived from any Talmudical hermeneutics, but known solely from the Jewish tradition.

== Status ==
According to Rabbinic Judaism, God transmitted the Torah to Moses in two parts: the written Torah which comprises the biblical books of Genesis through Deuteronomy, and the Oral Torah which was relayed orally, from Moses to his successors, to their successors, and finally to the rabbis.

In rabbinic discourse, a "law given to Moses at Sinai" refers to a law which has no source in the written Torah, and thus must have been transmitted orally since the time of Moses. These laws are nonetheless considered by the Talmud to have the force and gravity of biblical law as if they are written explicitly in the Torah.

In a few cases, however, later commentaries say that the law in question is "not literally" (לאו דווקא) from Sinai. According to some, even a rabbinic law may be called "from Sinai" if it is "as clear as a law from Sinai". R' Reuvein Margolies suggested that any law created by the Sanhedrin could be termed "from Sinai", since the institution of the Sanhedrin has its origins at Sinai.

In those oral teachings delivered by Moses unto Israel at Sinai, the rabbis have said that their underlying motives cannot be properly divulged through study, nor is it permissible to raise an objection against them by way of one of the hermeneutical principles applied in study, as they are always peremptory edicts, precluding or not admitting of debate or question.

== Examples ==
Some examples of a law given to Moses at Sinai are as follows:

- All women are required to fast on Yom Kippur, Halacha le-Moshe mi-Sinai.
- Women are exempt from the biblical command to dwell in a Sukkah on the seven days of Sukkot, Halacha le-Moshe mi-Sinai.
- A woman's bill of divorcement may be written on anything which is disconnected [from the ground], Halacha le-Moshe mi-Sinai.
- The blood of [slaughtered] wild beasts and fowl may be covered with anything that is fit for growing vegetation, Halacha le-Moshe mi-Sinai.
- They pierce the ear of a Hebrew bondman [who wishes to continue in bondage under his master], even with a [wooden] pick, even with a thorn, even with glass; Halacha le-Moshe mi-Sinai.
- The laws of orlah apply to fruit grown outside the Land of Israel, Halacha le-Moshe mi-Sinai.
- The leper who is purified from his tzaraath requires being shaved of all body hair till he is as smooth as a pumpkin rind, only in such places where his hair is clustered together and is conspicuous; Halacha le-Moshe mi-Sinai.
- When sewing together sheets of parchment belonging to a Torah scroll, one must not sew the sheets together at the upper and lower ends of the margins, but rather leave a space, Halacha le-Moshe mi-Sinai.
- She who sees a drop of blood resembling a mustard [seed], she sits and keeps watch over herself on its account for a period of seven days, [which days are to be] free from any additional signs of her natural purgation [if she is to be permitted unto her husband again], Halacha le-Moshe mi-Sinai.
- Tefillin are to be made square and black, Halacha le-Moshe mi-Sinai.
- He that sells a field, he is the one who signs the bill of sale. He that betroths unto himself a wife, he is the one who signs the bill of betrothal; Halacha le-Moshe mi-Sinai.
- The upper knot of Tzitzit is Halacha le-Moshe mi-Sinai.
- The sewing of a Torah scroll with sinews, Halacha le-Moshe mi-Sinai.
- The tying of the straps made into the shape of the Dalet on the head-tefillin and the shape of the Yod on the arm-tefillin, Halacha le-Moshe mi-Sinai.
- The letter "shin" embossed on the head-tefillin, Halacha le-Moshe mi-Sinai.
- The [folding] bridge of the tefillin (Aramaic: thitura) and the place where the strap passes through on the tefillin (Aramaic: maʻabarta), Halacha le-Moshe mi-Sinai.
- The prescribed units of measure (e.g. 40 seahs, size of an olive, a barleycorn, a lentil, et al.) practised by the Sages, and interposing objects that would disqualify an immersion in a mikveh (e.g. clay attached to the body or vessel, dough, gum resin, etc.), Halacha le-Moshe mi-Sinai.
- Circumcision takes precedence over Shabbat, Halacha le-Moshe mi-Sinai.
- The eleven-day period between each [monthly] menstrual cycle is Halacha le-Moshe mi-Sinai.

Sometimes, the dictum denotes an established, ageless tradition not derived or derivable from the Written Law, but simply practised or observed by Israel since time immemorial, such as the following examples:

- Nachum the scribe said: I have received a tradition from Rabbi Measha, who received it from his father, who received it from the zugot, who received it from the prophets, a law given to Moses at Sinai, that if one sows his field with two types of wheat and made them into one threshing-floor, he gives one peah; but if he makes two threshing-floors, he must grant two peahs.
- R. Yehoshua said: I have received as a tradition from Rabban Yohanan ben Zakkai, who heard it from his teachers, and his teacher from his teacher, as a law given to Moses at Sinai, that Elijah will not come (i.e. the harbinger of the Messiah) to declare unclean or clean, to remove afar or to bring nigh, but to remove afar those [families] that were brought nigh by violence, and to bring nigh those [families] that were removed afar by violence. (i.e. he will make no change in the Law, but only make an end of injustice)
- R. Eliezer said: I have received a tradition from Rabban Yohanan ben Zakkai, who heard it from his teacher, and his teacher from his teacher, as a law given to Moses at Sinai, that Ammon and Moab should give Poorman's Tithe in the Seventh Year.

Maimonides, in the introduction to his commentary on the Mishna, provides a list of the laws given to Moses at Sinai. They cover a wide variety of topics, including tefillin manufacture, Shabbat prohibitions, shemitah, tithes, sexual prohibitions, and the structure of a sukkah.

== See also ==
- Deposit of faith, a similar concept in some branches of Christianity
- Law of Moses
