= Hillel Bakis =

French writer

Hillel Bakis, born in 1949 Bône (Algérie) is an author, an editor and a publisher.

== Author ==
Hillel Bakis' books deal with topics related to Judaism and Jewish traditions (exegesis and liturgy, grammar, folklore, oral literature, etc.). His writings demonstrate the will to transmit Judaism and its traditions through a pedagogy adapted for each age (fables, tales and novel, exegesis) with an interest in the grammar and rabbinic interpretation methods of the biblical text (the "toolbox" provided by the oral Torah to allow access to the written Torah).

=== Tales, fables ===
Bakis has collected and rewritten tales and fables, contributing to the identification and preservation of oral narrative traditions and Jewish folklore, particularly that of the North Africa.. Bakis's fables depict animals (including those of the fox and the wolf), as told by masters of the Talmud. Some of the tales are on the style of the One Thousand and One Nights. Others trace important facts about the life of Rabbis from past centuries and scenes of daily life in Maghreb: faith, pilgrimages, but also a wonderful atmosphere. where the miracle comes to rub shoulders with banal situations of existence "(G. Touaty 2005).

=== Exegesis and the rabbinic methodology ===
Hillel Bakis is the author of a five-volume commentary on the Pentateuch, "The Voice of Jacob (הקל קול יעקב)", which has been reported as "a great commentary, interesting and profound" (R 'H. Kahn, 2015a) and "the very high quality of his work "was noted (G. Touaty, 2011). His commentary on biblical prophets "Understand the haftara" "was equally well received (G. Touaty, 2018). These books have received "an exceptional and unanimous welcome from the rabbinical world" (L. Bibas, 2017) as evidenced, for example, by the Rav Zecharia Zermati who speaks of "master stroke" and Rav R. Y. Dufour.

This commentary was supplemented by two methodological books: one on rabbinic methods of oral Torah interpretation (2013f), and the other on grammatical foundations (2013g). With his book on the longest of 'the Psalms (To read the Psalms, 2014) "the author surprises with the comment about his commentary: he approaches the grammatical side, does not hesitate to report the other commentators and to criticize them, explains the moral significance of the verses studied, and ends up giving the reader a complete idea of the texture of the verses "(Rav H. Kahn 2015b); "Hillel Bakis translated each verse ... giving a precise reading of each word, taking into account its grammatical structure, while explaining it" (G. Touaty, 2015). Hillel Bakis extended his commentary on the Pentateuch with a series of books on the Prophets, designed to enlighten the understanding of the texts read on the synagogue services on feasts, fasts, and chabbats (2017, 2018a, 2018b, 2019, 2020).

Hillel Bakis presents (2021d) a detailed inventory of units of measure (length, surface, volume, weight, monetary values, time, temperature) and currencies of the Bible and the Talmud. He quoted opinions and controversies among rabbinical decision-makers and provides many examples of the use of measures or currencies in the halacha.

=== Liturgy ===
In his methodological book on the reading of the Psalms, Bakis gives details of the cantillation of poetic books (Psalms), distinct from that of the prosodic books (Pentateuch, Prophets, etc.). In his series "Understanding the haftara", on the prophets, it specifies the customs of reading of the different communities. His study on the new-year trees (Tu bishvat), he gives details on the different customs and the complete ‘seder’ of the celebration.

=== Novel ===
In his novel "The Messiah is late!" (Bakis 2000d), Hillel Bakis constructs a plot with social and technological mutations as background (Dov d'Acco 2010). The action begins in the year 6000 of the Jewish calendar, the last date at which the Messiah must appear. A detective goes back in the past to understand why the Messiah has not yet manifested himself. This is probably the only science-fiction novel written by a North African Jew in the twentieth century.

== Editor and Publisher ==
Hillel Bakis chairs the Institute Isaiah Bakish dedicated to a rabbi-judge of the 16th century, he founded in 1987. The main activities are book publications, conferences, website, etc..

In 1992, Hillel Bakis published manuscript fragments of a 16th-century Moroccan rabbinical work (that of Rabbi Isaiah Bakish). He has presented, in prefaces, two books which he edited: one consists of about twenty chapters from the notes of a Jew of Tunis born in 1930 and aspiring to settle in Israel; the other one presents the medieval Judaism of the South of France. An activity report (on authors and books published between 1990 and 1997) was made available to the public.

== Works ==
- 1990 – Tales- (in French) Stories of Tunisian Jews on R 'Pinhas Uzan and his family , Hotsaat Bakish, Kiryat Ata, 78 pages
- 1992 – (in French) R’ Yesha’ya Bakish Isaiah Bakish, Hillel Bakis, editor, Fragments. Edition, introduction and notes on a Moroccan rabbinic manuscript – 16th century , Hotsaat Bakish, Kiryat Ata, 132 p.
- 2000a – Tales- (in French) Jewish tales and stories from North Africa, Vol. 1- The thread of time. Traditions and everyday life , Ed. A.J. Presse, 2000, 288 p.
- 2000b – Fables – (in French) Fox and the wolf ... and other fables of Israel . Editions Raphaël Jeunesse, 2000, Paris, 63 pages.
- 2000c – Tales- (in French) The Magic Formula of Chalom Chabazi ... and Other Stories (coauthor), Ed. Raphaël Jeunesse, 2000, Paris, 175 p. (p. 137-167)
- 2000d – Novel (in French) Messiah is late! , Ed. A.J. Presse, 2000, Les Lilas, 240 pages.
- (2001a) -(in French) " A major work restored to the public / Une œuvre majeure restituée au public ", On a new edition of Téhila ledavid (R’ David Ben Hassine, 18e century), by André E. Elbaz & Ephraïm Hazan, Lod. Actualité juive Hebdo, n° 697, 29 mars, p. 58
- (2001b), " Folklores of Israel: half a century of collecting », Actualité juive Hebdo, n° 707, du 14 juin, p. 49. https://editionsbakish.com/node/1820
- 2004– Liturgy (in French and Hebrew) Tou Bichevat. Seder of cabbalists, Hotsaat Bakish, Montpellier
- 2005a- Liturgy (in French and Hebrew) Séder de Tou Bichevat 32 p., Hotsaat Bakish, Montpellier
- 2005b- Tales- (in French) Jewish tales and stories from North Africa, Vol. 2- The paths of Heaven. Miracles, Supernatural, Strange …, Ed. A.J. Presse, Les Lilas, 288 p. (97 contes)
- 2008– Liturgy (in French and Hebrew) Séder de Tou Bichevat 4 p., (http://www.toratemet.net/image/users/21292/ftp/my_files/-Hillel-3.pdf, 2008)
- 2009a – Liturgy (in French and Hebrew) Séder de Tou Bichevat , 32 p.. 2ème Ed., Montpellier, paper book; Ebooks: 2009b, http://hebrewbooks.org/42889, Brooklyn; 2009c, http://www.toratemet.net/image/users/21292/ftp/my_files/toubichvat-hbakis.pdf); and 2009d, https://web.archive.org/web/20130409231503/http://chiourim.com/brochure_sur_tou_bichevat_57724849.html
- 2009e- Liturgy (in French and Hebrew) Etudes et Haggadah de Tou BiChevat. Livre d’étude, Institute Rabbi Yécha'ya, Hotsaat Bakish, Montpellier, janv. 2009, XIV-282 p.
- 2011 – Lecture (in French) To love and understand the divine word: the transmission of Judaism from the tender age to forever , 17 Nov, Great Synagogue, Lyon. http://www.cdo-lyon.catholique.fr/spip.php?article1457
- 2013a to 2013e- Exegesis (in French) The voice of Jacob. Weekly sections of the Torah according to rabbinical tradition . Hotsaat Bakish, 2013. Tome 1 Commenter Béréchit (XXVI-216 p., 2013a); T. 2 Commenter Chémot (XII-190 p., 2013b); 2013c, T. 3 Commenter Vayikra (XII-174 p.); 2013d, T. 4 Commenter Bamidbar (XII-182 p., 2013b); 2013e, T. 5 Commenter Dévarim (XIV-236 p., 2013b).
- 2013f- Exegesis, methodology (in French) Interpret the Torah. Rabbinical traditions and methods , XIV-282 p., Institute Rabbi Yécha'ya, Hotsaat Bakish
- 2013g- Grammar (in French and Hebrew) Hebrew grammar. Read the Bible and pray accurately , (with details of R’ Zecharia Zermati), XVI-420 p., Institute Rabbi Yécha'ya, Hotsaat Bakish
- 2013 – Editor – Rav Zecharia Zermati) Forty-nine comments and original grammatical clarifications . Voir : H. Bakis, Grammaire hébraïque (2013g)
- 2014– Exegesis (in French and Hebrew) To read the Psalms. Study of the Alphabet (Ps. 119). Text. Phonetics and rhythm. New translation. Comments. Grammatical Abstract, X-294 p., Institute Rabbi Yécha'ya, Hotsaat Bakish, Montpellier
- 2016a – Editor – Preface (in French) William R. Belhassen, Alya's desire. Testimony of a Tunis Jew, 22 chap., ebook
- 2016b – Hillel Bakis éditor and author of the Preface, pp, 1-4; (in French) Y. Maser, The Rabbis of the South of France in the Middle Ages and their writings. The Sages of Provincia, Institute Rabbi Yécha'ya, Hotsaat Bakish, VIII-216 p.
- 2017 Exegesis (in French and Hebrew) To Understand the Haftara. The Prophets of the Jewish Year According to Rabbinical Tradition, Part 1:הִנֵּה יָמִים בָּאִים Holidays, fasting, special Shabbat, 404 p., 2017. Institute Rabbi Yécha'ya- Hotsaat Bakish,
- 2018–2020 – Exegesis (in French and Hebrew) To Understand the Haftara Part II: וַתְּחִי רוּחַ Following the order of parachas, II-1. Bereshit, 304 p., 2018a; II-2. Shemot, 322 p., 2018b; II-3. Vayikra, 330 p., 2019; Bamidbar, 302 p., 2020. Institute Rabbi Yécha'ya, Hotsaat Bakish
- 2020 - (in French and Hebrew) Manuscript Traces... Traces manuscrites de l'œuvre de Rabbi Yesha'ya Bakish זצ"ל Isaiah Bakish: un des premiers A'haronim parmi les Sages de Castille au Maroc (v. 1545-v. 1620), Ebook, Kiryat Ata, Israel; Institut Rabbi Yécha'ya, Hotsaat Bakish, 602 pages, décembre.
- 2021a- Liturgy (in French and Hebrew) Séder de Tou Bichevat , 32 p.. 3ème Ed., Montpellier
- 2021b- (in French and Hebrew) Printed Traces of the Work of Yesha'ya Bakish זצ"ל Isaiah Bakish: One of the First A'haronim Among the Sages of Castile in Morocco (v. 1545-v. 1620) , Ebook, Kiryat Ata, Israel; Institute Rabbi Yécha'ya, Hotsaat Bakish (3rd. Edition, April). 476 p. (1st ed. 2019).
- 2021c - (in French and Hebrew) Digital Traces of the Work of Rabbi Yesha'ya Bakish זצ"ל Isaiah Bakish: One of the First A'haronim Among the Sages of Castile in Morocco (v. 1545-v. 1620), Ebook, Kiryat Ata, Israel; Institute Rabbi Yécha'ya, Hotsaat Bakish, 340 p.
- 2021d - (in French and Hebrew) Inventory of measures and currencies of the Bible and the Talmud and their halachic implications November. Institute Rabbi Yécha'ya, Hotsaat Bakish, Montpellier/Kiryat Ata, 484 p. (BibliEurope, Paris).

== Secondary sources (bibliography) ==
- (in French) Alliance.fr (2017), Sur Comprendre la haftara, http://www1.alliancefr.com/culture/livre-juif-comprendre-la-haftara-les-prophetes-de-lannee-juive-6061128 [archive]
- (in French) Eliyahou Bakis (2021), « Le fini au service de l’infini. Préface », in Inventaire des mesures et monnaies du Tanakh et du Talmud (Hillel Bakis, see 2021d), p. XV-XXII - https://editionsbakish.com/13414-2
- (in French) Ben David, Sandrine (2011), « Lyon. Conférence d'Hillel Bakis à Tilsitt » Actualité juive, n° 1189, 15 décembre, p. 47
- (in French) Bibas, Liora (2017), « Facilitate the study of theTanakh. Hillel Bakis », Le P’tit Hebdo, avril, Jérusalem, p. 25
- (in French) Cohen Nicole (2019), « Invitation to discover the work of Hillel Bakis, author on the Jewish tradition », https://www.o-judaisme.com/blogs/salle-de-lecture/invitation-a-la-decouverte-de-l-oeuvre-de-hillel-bakis, 8 juillet
- (in French) CDOL, Comité diocésain pour l'œcuménisme de Lyon (2011), « Conférence de Hillel Bakis à la grande synagogue de Lyon », http://www.cdo-lyon.cef.fr/spip.php?article1457, nov.)
- (in French) D'Acco, Dov (2010), « Compte rendu – "Le Messie est en retard" », "Francophones de Galilée", Lecture n°11, http://m.francogalil.com/pages/coup-de-coeur-litteraire-dov/critiques-2010/le-messie-est-en-retard.html?version=mobile%5B%5D (la page web n’existe plus mais le texte a été conservé sur un autre site https://editionsbakish.com/119 )
- (in French) Dufour, Rav Rahamim Yéochoua' (2014), « Compte rendu – La voix de Jacob », http://louyehi.wordpress.com/2014/03/21/parachat-hachavoua-paracha-de-la-semaine-du-vendredi-21-au-chabbat-22-mars-2014/
- (in French) Halimi Eliahou Serge (2012), "Le Grand Rabbin Emmanuel Chouchena…". E.F.C., Paris, p. 345
- (in Romanian) Herşcovici, Lucian-Zeev (2014), « TU BIŞVAT, Anul nous al pomilor », http://www.baabel.ro/94-orizonturi-spirituale/616-lucian-zeev-herscovici-tu-bisvat-anul-nou-al-pomilor%5B%5D
- (in Romanian) Herşcovici, Lucian-Zeev (2017), "Omul şi pomul" (l'homme et l'arbre), 9 Feb, Arhiva editii, editia 242, Orizonturi spirituale, http://baabel.suprapus.ro/2017/02/omul-si-pomul/#prettyphoto%5B%5D.
- (in French) Kahn, Rav H. (2015a), « Commenter la Bible : "La voix de Jacob" », Kountrass Famille, Jérusalem, n° 184, avril, p. 78
- (in French) Kahn, Rav H. (2015b), « Pour lire les Psaumes », Kountrass Famille, Jérusalem, n° 185, mai, page 76
- (in French) Layani, Claude (2017), « " To understand the haftara. The prophets of the Jewish year " », alliance.com, http://www1.alliancefr.com/culture/livre-juif-comprendre-la-haftara-les-prophetes-de-lannee-juive-6061128
- (in French) Lewin, Jules (2010), « Hillel Bakis... », Actualité juive, n° 1146, 30 décembre, p. 55
- (in French) Mamou, Chantal (2015), « Béziers, a small but dynamic community », Actualité juive, n° 1364, 5 novembre, p. 35
- Rabbinic recommendations (selection) given to the books of Hillel Bakis (1990–2018) by: Rav Meir Abitbol (2009, 2013, 2014, 2017), Rav Shlomo Amar (2017, déc. 2017), Rav Shlomo Aviner (2017), Rav Gilles Bernheim (2010), Rav Henri Kahn (2014), Rav David 'Hanania Pinto (2012), Rav René Samuel Sirat (2004), Rav Zecharia Zermati (5767/2007, 2013).
- (in French) Slotz-Gaudin, Stéphane (2000), Interview « Rendez-vous avec Hillel Henry Bakis », Actualité juive, n° 659, du 8 juin 2000, page 5 – https://editionsbakish.com/node/1693.
- (in French) Sokolka Ezra (2014), « Hebrew grammar presented with clarity and precision », Actualité juive, n° 1295, 27 mars, p. 48
- (in French) Touaty Gérard (2005), « Les chemins du Ciel. Contes et récits juifs d'Afrique du Nord », Actualité juive, n° 884, 31 mars, p. 16
- (in French) Touaty Gérard (2011), « "La voix de Jacob" » (édition 2009), Actualité juive, n°1158, 24 mars, p. 33
- (in French) Touaty Gérard (2014), « "La voix de Jacob" » (édition 2013), Actualité juive, n° 1295, 27 mars, p. 37
- (in French) Touaty Gérard (2015), « "Pour lire les Psaumes. Alphabeta, Ps. 119 ", Actualité juive, n° 1350, 25 juin, p. 30
- (in French) Touaty, Gérard (2018). « "Comprendre la haftara. Béréchit" », Actualité juive, 25 octobre
