= Samson of Chinon =

French Talmudist

Samson ben Isaac of Chinon (c. 1260 – c. 1330) (Hebrew: שמשון מקינון) was a French Talmudist who lived at Chinon. In Talmudic literature he is generally called after his native place, Chinon (Hebr. קינון), and sometimes by the abbreviation MaHaRShaḲ. He was a contemporary of Peretz Kohen Gerondi, who declared Samson to be the greatest rabbinical authority of his time. The name of his brother was Matatia.

== Works ==
Samson was the author of the following works:

- Sefer Keritut (Constantinople, 1515), a methodology of the Talmud divided into five parts:
  - Bet Middot, treating of the thirteen rules of R. Ishmael
  - Bet ha-Miḳdash, on the rules for deductions by analogy and conclusions a fortiori
  - Netibot 'Olam, containing explanations of the 32 rules of R. Eliezer ben Jose ha-Gelili
  - Yemot 'Olam, giving the names and the chronology of the Tannaim and Amoraim, and setting forth a method for deciding between the contrary opinions of two Rabbis
  - Leshon Limmudim, explanations of certain halakic decisions.

The "Sefer Keritut," owing to its easy style and its author's great authority, became a classic.

- Ḳonṭres, a commentary on the Talmudic treatises Erubin and Abodah Zarah; mentioned in the Sefer Keritut.
- Bi'ur ha-Geṭ (Vienna MS. No. 48), on the laws concerning divorce.

Samson wrote also responsa, several of which are quoted by Joseph Colon and Solomon ben Adret. According to Heinrich Gross, Samson was the author of the supercommentary on Ibn Ezra's commentary on the Pentateuch found by Judah Mosconi at Perpignan between 1363 and 1375 (Halberstam MS.). As regards the word (ממרשילאה = "of Marseille"), which appears in the manuscript after the name Samson of Chinon, Gross believes that Samson settled at Marseille after the banishment of the Jews from France.
