= Moses ben Mordecai Zacuto =

Dutch rabbi, Kabbalist, and poet

Moses ben Mordecai Zacuto (c. 1625 – 1 October 1697), also known by the Hebrew acronym RaMa"Z, was a rabbi, Kabbalist, and poet. Zacuto, who was born into a Portuguese Marrano family in Amsterdam, studied Jewish subjects under Saul Levi Morteira (an elegy on the latter's death by Zacuto was published by D. Kaufmann in REJ, 37 (1898), 115). He also studied secular subjects, such as the Latin language. As a pupil of Morteira, he may also have been, as a youth still in Amsterdam, a fellow student of Baruch Spinoza.

== Travels ==
He was inclined to mysticism from his youth, and at one time fasted forty days that he might forget the Latin which he had learned, since, in his opinion, it could not be reconciled with kabbalistic truths. To continue his Talmudic studies he went from Amsterdam to Poland, as is clear from the letter of recommendation which he gave at Venice in 1672 to the delegates who had come to Italy to collect money for the oppressed Polish communities. It was his intention to make a pilgrimage to Palestine, but on the way he was persuaded to remain as rabbi in Venice, where he stayed, with the exception of a short residence in Padua, from 1645 until the summer of 1673. He was then called to Mantua at a fixed salary of 300 ducats, and remained there until his death, twenty-four years later. His epitaph is given by Wolf and Landshuth.

== Mystical pursuits ==
Rabbi Zacuto applied himself with great diligence to the study of the Kabbalah under Ḥayyim Vital's pupil Benjamin ha-Levi, who had come to Italy from Safed; and this remained the chief occupation of his life. He established a seminary for the study of the Kabbalah, and his favorite pupils, Benjamin ha-Kohen and Abraham Rovigo, often visited him for months at a time at Venice or Mantua, to investigate kabalistic mysteries. He composed forty-seven liturgical poems, chiefly Kabbalistic, enumerated by Landshuth Some of them have been printed in the festal hymns Hen Kol Hadash, edited by Moses Ottolenghi (Amsterdam, 1712), and others have been incorporated in different prayer-books.

He also wrote penitential poems (Tikkun Shovavim, Venice, 1712; Leghorn, 1740) for the service on the evening before Rosh Hodesh, as well as prayers for Hosha'na Rabbah and similar occasions, all in the spirit of the Kabbalah. He also authored a poem containing a thousand words, each beginning with the letter א, Elef Alpin; a long poem, Tofteh Arukh, or L'Inferno Figurato (Venice, 1715, 1744), in which he depicts the punishments of hell; and the oldest dramatic poem in the Hebrew language, which A. Berliner first edited under the title Yesod 'Olam (Berlin, 1874).

In his Shorshei Hashemot (Book of the Roots of the Names) he included long quotations of the Fez Kabbalist R' Isaiah Bakish (16-17th c.)

== Works ==
- Hen Kol Hadash (hymns), ed. Moses Ottolenghi (Amsterdam, 1712)
- Tikkun Shovavim (poems), Venice, 1712; Leghorn, 1740
- Shudda deDayyane, a guide for decisions on commercial law (Mantua, 1678; reprinted in Ha-Goren, iii. 181 et seq.)
- Ḳol haReMeZ (published posthumously), a commentary on the Mishnah (which he knew by heart), with elucidations of the commentaries of Bertinoro and others (Amsterdam, 1719)
- A collection of responsa with the decisions of contemporaries (Venice, 1760)
- Iggerot haReMeZ, containing letters of cabalistic content written by himself and others and his poem 'Elef Alpin' (Leghorn, 1780)
- Yesod Olam (Berlin, 1874)
- He edited and emended also the Zohar (Venice, 1663) and other writings. A considerable number of his works, such as a commentary on the Jerusalem Talmud, homilies, and cabalistic writings, are still unpublished as of 1906.
- Shorshei HaShemot (Book of the Roots of the Names), XVIIe Century (hebr.). Ed. Nehora, c. 2010.
