= Semicha in sacrifices =

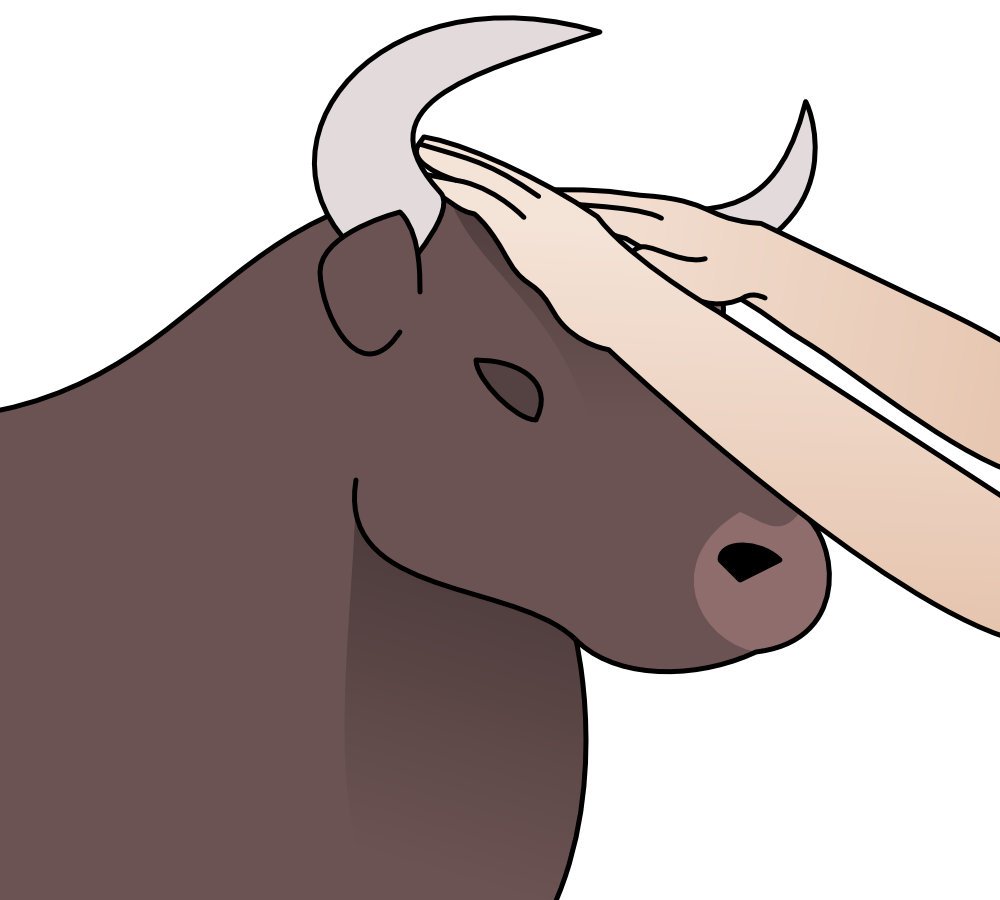
An illustration of Semicha during a sacrifice.

In the Hebrew Bible, semicha (literally "leaning") refers to the owner's placing of his hands before the priest offers the korban (animal sacrifice) in the Temple in Jerusalem. This involved pressing firmly on the head of the sacrificial animal, thereby symbolically "transmitting" sins onto the animal or, in other interpretations, to transform the sacrifice into an offering acceptable to HaShem.

== In the Hebrew Bible ==
The basis for the mitzvah of semicha is Leviticus 1:4:

And he shall lay [samach] his hand upon the head of the burnt-offering, and it shall be accepted for him to make atonement for him.

It is also mentioned in Leviticus 4:24 with regard to the laying on of hands over one's sin-offering, before it was slaughtered: "And he shall lay his hand upon the head of the goat." In Pseudo Jonathan's Aramaic translation of the Pentateuch, the translator of the verse explains its sense: "And he shall lay his right hand with force on the head of the goat." According to Philo of Alexandria, the custom of laying on of hands was done in order to aid him in developing a clean conscience, so that he can say without guile: "These hands have not taken a bribe to distort justice, neither have they divided the spoil, nor have they coveted, neither have they shed innocent blood, etc." According to Jewish tradition, the first dispute in Israel concerned whether or not it was permissible to lay hands upon one's sacrificial animal by applying one's full body weight on a Festival Day.

== Laws in the Talmud and later rabbinic sources ==
The Jerusalem Talmud mentions that the first dispute in Israel concerned the laying on of hands (semicha) upon the head of one's sacrificial animal during a Festival Day, with applied force, some permitting the owner of the animal to do so, others forbidding him to do so.

The Babylonian Talmud provides a more detailed set of regulations for the practice of semicha.

How does one lean [perform semicha]? The offering stands in the north, with its face towards the west, and the one who leans stands in the east, with his face to the west. And he places his two hands between the two horns of the offering; however, there may be nothing interposing between his [bare] hands and the offering; and he confesses over a chatat [sin-offering] the sins of a chatat, and over an asham [guilt-offering] the sins of an asham. and over an olah (burnt-offering) [...the sins of an olah].

The Mishnah and Talmud record a debate on whether semicha may be performed on Jewish holidays, as it is considered a form of labor by the animal (supporting the owner's weight) which would normally be forbidden on holidays.

Women who offer sacrifices are allowed to perform semicha, but not required to. This ruling is extensively debated in later sources, as it involves the questions of whether this semicha fulfilled the commandment or else was done purely to gratify the women without having ritual significance; whether performing a commandment in a situation where it does not apply violates the prohibition of bal tosif; how a "commandment" can exist if its performance is not required; whether a blessing can be recited on such an optional "commandment"; and so on. The results of this discussion are highly relevant to other commandments which are required for men and optional for women, such as lulav and shofar.

== Interpretations ==
The symbolism of this custom has been variously explained.

According to Philo, the sacrificer intended his act to imply that "these hands have done no wrong, but have performed good and useful deeds." This, however, applies only to thank-offerings and meal-offerings, and not to sin-offerings or to offerings of atonement.

Some rabbinical authorities interpreted "semikah" as meaning that the sacrificer, by laying his hands upon the animal, transferred his sins to it and imposed upon it the punishment which his conduct had merited. This meaning fits well in regard to the Yom Kippur sin-offering of Leviticus 16:21, but less reasonable as an explanation of other sacrifices, particularly those not related to sins.

A similar suggestion is that by laying hands, the sacrificer designates the animal to take his place as that which deserves to be killed.

Another approach is laying hand is intended to designate the animal to be a sacrifice, or else indicate the connection between the animal and its owner.

According to some, different reasons apply to laying hands on different sacrifices; for example, Ibn Ezra argued that laying two hands on the Yom Kippur goat (Leviticus 16:21) indicates a transfer of sins, while laying one hand (on other sacrifices, e.g. Leviticus 1:4) designates the animal as a sacrifice and indicates the animal's ownership.
