= Eliezer ben Jose =

First century CE rabbi

Eliezer ben Jose (Heb. Eliezer ben Yose HaGelili) was a Jewish rabbi who lived in Judea in the 2nd century CE. He was the son of Jose the Galilean, and is regarded as a tanna of the fourth generation. He was a pupil of Rabbi Akiva.

== Career and teachings ==
While he cultivated both the halakha and the aggadah, his fame rests mainly on his work in the latter field. Indeed, later generations said, "Wherever you meet a word of R. Eliezer ben R. Jose HaGelili in the aggadah, make your ear like a funnel." Even where he touched on the Halakha, he always brought exegesis to bear upon the matter. Thus, arguing that after legal proceedings are closed the beit din may not propose a compromise, he says, "The judge who then brings about a settlement is a sinner; and he who blesses him is a blasphemer, of whom it may be said "He blesses the compromiser, he spurns the Lord". The Law must perforate the mountain (i.e., must not be set aside under any considerations); for thus the Bible says, 'Ye shall not be afraid of the face of man; for the judgment is God's'". He compiled a set of hermeneutic rules as guides in interpreting the Scriptures (the Baraita on the Thirty-two Rules), some of which are adaptations of those of his predecessors, and thus applicable to Halakha as well as to aggadah. Those specifically homiletical are based on syntactical or phraseological or similar peculiarities of the Biblical texts that constitute the substance of the Midrashim.

Like his colleagues, at the close of the first academic session after the Bar Kochba revolt, Eliezer publicly thanked the people of Usha. He said, "The Bible relates, 'The Lord has blessed the house of Obed-edom, and all that belongs to him, because of the Ark of the Covenant.' Is this not very significant? If, for merely dusting and cleaning the Ark, which neither ate nor drank, Obed-edom was blessed, how much more deserving of blessings are they who have housed the scholars, have furnished them with meat and drink, and have otherwise shared with them their goods!". Elsewhere this is attributed to another speaker, while Eliezer is credited with the following: "It is recorded, 'Saul said to the Kenites . . . You showed kindness to all the children of Israel when they came up out of Egypt.' Was it not to Moses alone to whom Jethro ["the Kenite"] had shown kindness? But the Bible here implies the rule that whoso deals kindly with any one of the spiritual heads of Israel, to him it is accounted as if he had done so to the whole people".

With reference to the Biblical statement "The bones of Joseph, which the children of Israel brought up out of Egypt, buried they in Shechem," he remarks, "Was it not Moses who brought up those bones? But this teaches that where one starts a good deed and fails to complete it, another party performing the unfinished part, the whole deed is credited to the latter".

He counsels that one should advance or postpone a journey in order to enjoy the company of a good man; and likewise to avoid the company of a bad one.

== Baraita of the Thirty-Two Rules ==
The Baraita of the Thirty-Two Rules, or Baraita of R. Eliezer ben Jose ha-Gelili, is a baraita in the introduction to the Midrash HaGadol giving the thirty-two hermeneutic rules according to which the Tanakh is interpreted. The opening of the text is attributed to R. Eliezer ben Jose; modern opinions vary as to how much of it was in fact composed by Jose or his students.
