= Malbim =

Orthodox rabbi

Rabbi Meïr Leibush ben Yehiel Michel Wisser
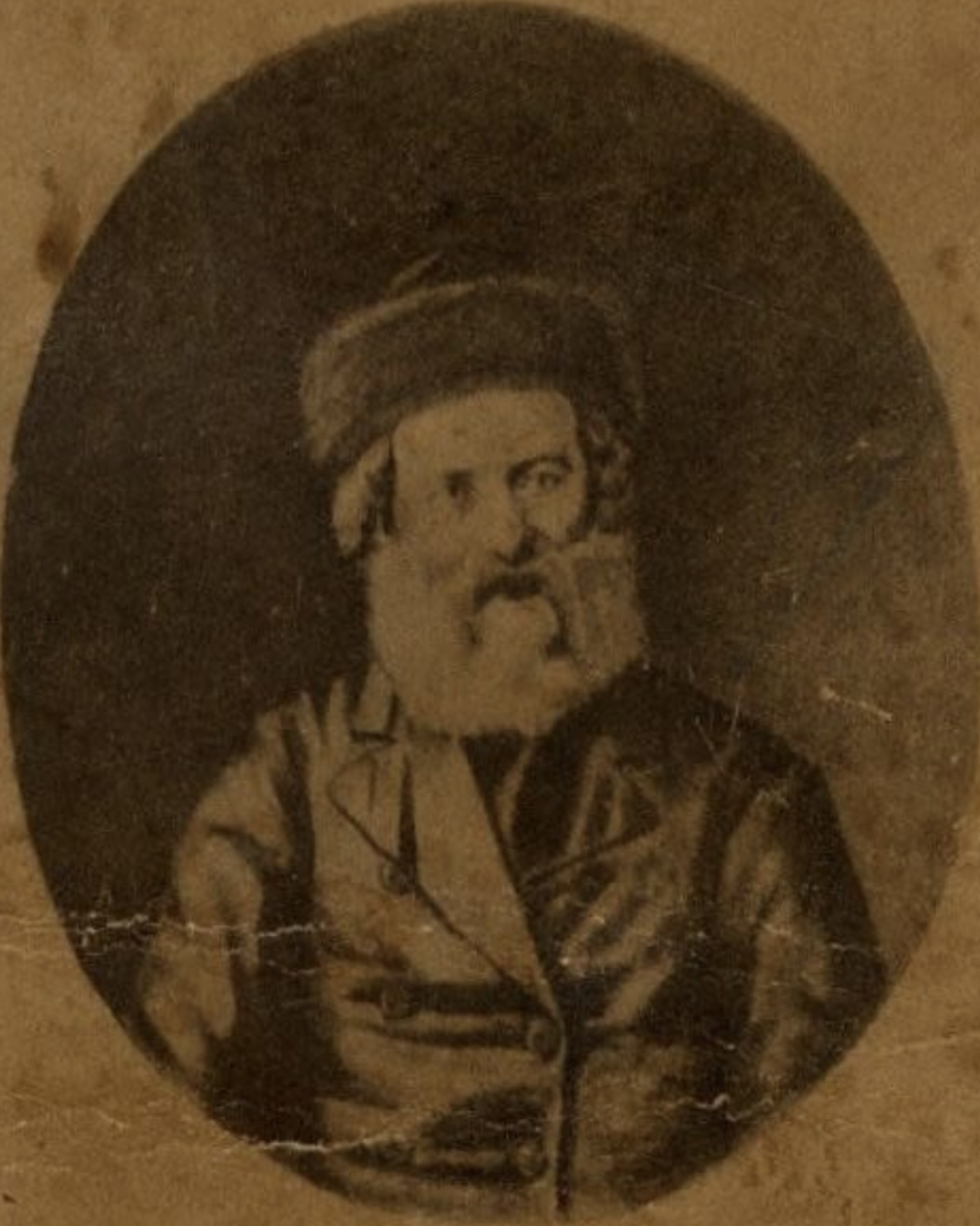
- Rabbi Meir Leibush ben Yehiel Michal, "the Malbim"
- Title: Malbim

Personal life
- Born: March 7, 1809 Volochysk, Volhynia, Russian Empire
- Died: September 18, 1879 (aged 70) Kyiv, Russian Empire

Religious life
- Religion: Judaism

Meir Leibush ben Yehiel Michel Wisser (March 7, 1809 – September 18, 1879), better known as the Malbim (Hebrew: מלבי״ם), was a rabbi, master of Hebrew grammar, and Bible commentator. The name Malbim was derived from the Hebrew initials of his name. He used this acronym as his surname in all his published works and became known by it in common usage. His writings do not include works about Kohelet or Eicha.

== Biography ==
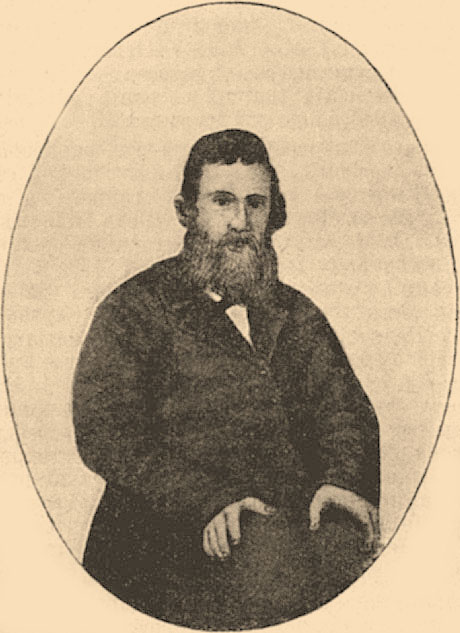

Malbim was born in Volochysk, Volhynia, to Yehiel Michel Wisser. His father educated him in Hebrew and the Talmud. After being orphaned as a child, Meïr was cared for and educated by his stepfather, Rabbi Leib of Volochysk.

At the age of 13, he went to study in Warsaw where he became known as "the Illui from Volhynia." At age fourteen, he married but shortly thereafter divorced. The Malbim showed talent from his early childhood, and his works indicate that he had considerable knowledge of secular sciences and history. From 1838 to 1845, he served as rabbi of Wreschen. In the latter year, he was called to the rabbinate of Kempen, where he remained until 1859. He was thereafter also known as der Kempener Magid.

His first major work, published at age 25, was Artzas HaChaim—a commentary on Orach Chaim.

In 1859, Malbim became chief rabbi of Bucharest, Romania. He had disagreements with the upper class and educated Jews there; some of them Austrian citizens (called in Romanian sudiţi) led by the noted Dr. Iuliu Barasch. They wanted to introduce changes in the spirit of modern European life into the life of the local Jewry as was done in some Reform congregations. Malbim defended the traditional style of Orthodox Judaism, which demanded strict adherence to Jewish law and tradition. He rejected almost all suggestions to edit the Siddur, give up beards or other distinctions of exterior appearance, or make other changes in observance.

Malbim opposed the construction of the Choral Temple which would be equipped with a choir and organ similar to the Great Synagogue of Leopoldstadt in Vienna. He thought this was too Christian in style. In 1864, the Choral Temple became the main neo-orthodox synagogue in Romania. He also condemned the founding (before he arrived) of the first two elementary schools in Bucharest for Jewish children to offer a general knowledge curriculum. In this period, Romanian officials encouraged such efforts to integrate the Jews into mainstream Romanian life.

Malbim's insistence on adhering to the halakha, such as daily inspection of butcher's knives, resulted in portions of the religious personnel (e.g., shochtim and dayanim) becoming hostile toward him. Through their frequent complaints, his opponents almost succeeded in having him sent to prison. Malbim was freed through the intervention of Sir Moses Montefiore upon the condition that he leave Romania.

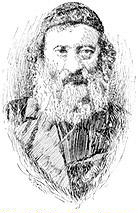
The Malbim

Malbim went to Constantinople and complained to the Turkish government but obtained no satisfaction. After staying six months in Paris, he went to Lunshitz, in Russian Poland, as successor to his deceased father-in-law, Hayyim Auerbach (1866). Shortly afterward, he became rabbi at Kherson and thence was called to the rabbinate of Mogilev on the Dnieper (1870). There, too, he was a staunch supporter of Judaism and was resented by the richer Jews; they denounced him as a political criminal, and the governor of Moghilev forced him to leave the town.

Malbim went to Königsberg as chief rabbi of the Polish community, but his conflicts with Reform Jews continued. Malbim visited Vilna in 1879, where the community would have appointed him as rabbi, but the governor of Vilna opposed the election. He did not want to sanction the appointment of a rabbi who had been expelled from Moghilev as a political criminal. Malbim also declined an offer to be chief rabbi of the Orthodox in New York City. In September 1879, Malbim was traveling to Kremenchuk, where he had been called as rabbi, when he fell sick. He died on Rosh Hashanah 5640 in Kyiv.

== Methodology and style ==
Malbim's fame and popularity rest upon his novel commentary on the Bible. His first published commentary was on Megillat Esther (1845), followed by his commentary on most of the Hebrew Tanakh from then until 1876. His commentary on the Bible is based most notably upon his principle that there are no true synonyms in the Tanakh; apparent stylistic repetitions are not that, but rather each introduces a distinct idea. His approach is described as follows:

"Advancing a project initiated in Ya‘akov Mecklenberg's Pentateuch commentary, Malbim formulates 613 grammatical principles to justify rabbinic halakhic exegesis in Sifra and elsewhere. To demonstrate the sanctity of scripture, Malbim devised a unique hermeneutic that he ambitiously applied to the entire Bible, resulting in one of the monumental Jewish scholarly achievements of the era: a wide-ranging, comprehensive commentary .... that infuses traditional Hebrew linguistic, philosophical, and mystical learning with contemporary concepts from science, psychology, epistemology, logic, and metaphysics."

According to his method, there is no repetition or duplication in the verses, and no expression comes to the "glory of reading" (as claimed, for example, by Ibn Ezra).

Its interpretation of the Torah consists of two parts intertwined with each other: In the parts on which there are halachic midrash, the commentary is actually on the halachic midrash. He discusses them in comparison to simplifying the verses while being precise in biblical grammar. The first midrash on which the commentary was written is the Sifrah, and as a background for his commentary he wrote a treatise called "Ayelet HaShahar" in which he formulates 613 (Taryag) rules from which all the halachic laws are derived: 248 (Ramah) rules deal with the syntax of the law and 365 rules deal with semantic grammars and the differences between words. At the end of each rule there is a reference to which laws in the book express it, and indeed all the laws of the book are mapped to rules. Also in his commentaries on the Mechilta and the Sifre written after that, there are references to the rules in the Ayelet Hashahar from which they were derived, and in his introduction to "Ayelet Hashahar" he invites the Torah sages to analyze all of the halachic midrash in the Talmud in this way.

In the parts that do not have halachic midrash, he interprets the story according to the depth of the simplicity, when at the beginning of each story he presents questions to which he answers, similar to the interpretation of Rabbi Izaac Abarbanel. Even in these commentaries of his, especially on the Book of Genesis, there is a lot of halachic innovation, compared to other commentaries in which the main halachic discussion stems from precisions only in the verses that deal with halachic, such as in the parashat Mishpatim, for example. Malbim had a broad education which he used in his commentaries, and thus we find several times in his commentary mentions of Philo of Alexandria, Kant and other philosophers, as well as the words of the learned who preceded him.

"Mikra'ei Kodesh", a commentary to the Prophets and Hagiographa, is also about the depth of simplicity and relative length compared to other commentaries. It consists of a short part of the "interpretation of the words" and a long part of a systematic interpretation of the biblical text in question. Its commentaries have a different name for each book.

== Works ==
- "Artzoth haChayim", commentary and novellae on the Shulchan Aruch (section Orah Hayim, Breslau, 1837);
- "Artzoth haShalom", collection of sermons (Krotoschin, 1839);
- "HaTorah vehaMitzva", analytical and innovative commentary on the Pentateuch and the midrash halakha (Warsaw, 1874–80), including the linguistic guide Ayelet ha-Shachar on differences between similar terms in Hebrew;
- "Mikra'ei Kodesh", commentary on the Prophets and Hagiographa (ib. 1874; this commentary is in parallel, on the words and on the sense; Malbim always endeavored to explain the different meanings of synonyms);
- "Mashal uMelitza", dramatic philippic, in verse, against hypocrisy (Paris, 1867).
- "Eretz Hemdah", Commentary on the Bible according to the Midrash. (Vilna 1929)
