= List of Belarusian Jews =

Presented below are lists of notable Belarusians of Jewish descent, Jewish people born on the territory of present-day Belarus or of full or partial Belarusian Jewish origin.

== Scientists ==
- Zhores Alferov, physicist, Nobel Prize (2000), born in Viciebsk (Jewish mother)
- Yakov Zel'dovich, physicist
- Lev Vygotsky, psychologist
- Seymour Lubetzky, cataloging theorist
- Semyon Kosberg, Soviet aircraft and rocket engineer, born in Słucak
- Lera Boroditsky, Cognitive psychologist
- Noam Chomsky, linguist
- Paul Krugman, economist
- Paul B. Sigler, biochemist, parents from Minsk

=== Mathematicians ===
- Naum Akhiezer, mathematician, born in Čerykaŭ
- Issai Schur, German-Israeli mathematician, born in Mahiloŭ
- Oscar Zariski, Belarusian mathematician

== Politicians ==
=== United States ===
- Leonard Adleman, Computer Scientist
- David Dubinsky, labor leader, born in Bieraście
- Joseph Schlossberg, labor activist
- Baruch Charney Vladeck, journalist, labor leader and politician

=== Canada ===
- David Lewis (Losz), ex-leader of the NDP

=== International ===
- Alexander Parvus, international revolutionary, born in Bierazino

=== Israel ===
- Shimon Peres, Israeli prime minister, Nobel Prize winner (1994)
- Chaim Weizmann, first president of Israel, inventor of synthetic acetone, born in Motal
- Menachem Begin, Israeli prime minister, Nobel Prize winner (1978), born in Brest
- Yitzhak Shamir, Israeli prime minister (1984–85 1988–90), born in Ruzhany
- Zerach Warhaftig, born in Vaukavysk
- Berl Katznelson, One of the intellectual founders of the Labor movement in Israel
- Kadish Luz, Israeli speaker of the Knesset, born in Bobruysk
- Yitzhak Rabin, Israeli prime minister, Nobel Prize winner (1994)

=== Russian Empire and the USSR and Russia ===
- Hesya Helfman, Russian revolutionary, member of Narodnaya Volya
- Valeriya Novodvorskaya, liberal Russian politician, Soviet dissident
- Iosif Bleikhman, anarchist revolutionary

=== Belarus ===
- Viktor Sheiman, adviser to President Alexander Lukashenko, influential Belarusian politician (of partial Jewish descent)
- Mikola Abramchyk, president of the Council of the Belarusian Democratic Republic (of partial Jewish descent)

== Writers ==
- Isaac Dov Berkowitz, Israeli writer
- Źmitrok Biadula, Belarusian poet
- Morris Raphael Cohen, philosopher
- Leon Kobrin
- Lazar Lagin
- Ayn Rand, father born in Brest-Litovsk
- David Pinski, American and Israeli writer, born in Mahiliou
- Ryhor Reles
- Mendele Mocher Sforim, writer
- Carlos Sherman, Belarusian-Uruguayan writer and translator (Jewish father)
- Immanuel Velikovsky, cosmology writer
- Celia Dropkin, American poet (Yiddish)
- Samuel Ornitz, American novelist and screenwriter

== Journalists ==
- Larry King, of Belarusian-Jewish parents
- Eugene Lyons
- Andrew Patner, of Belarusian-Jewish grandparents

== Historians ==
- Simon Dubnow, Jewish historian
- Lazar Gulkowitsch, Jewish Studies scholar
- Avraham Harkavi, historian
- S. Ansky, a scholar who documented Jewish folklore and mystical beliefs, born in Chashniki

== Composers and musicians ==
- Modest Altschuler, cellist, orchestral conductor and composer
- Irving Berlin, American composer
- Arkadi Duchin, Israeli singer-songwriter and musical producer
- Mark Fradkin, Soviet composer

== Artists ==
- Léon Bakst, painter and scene- and costume designer
- Marc Chagall, painter
- Ossip Zadkine, sculptor (Jewish father)
- Michel Kikoine, painter
- Naum Gabo, sculptor
- Antoine Pevsner, sculptor
- Pinchus Kremegne, painter
- Chaïm Soutine, painter
- Mark Rothko, painter
- El Lissitzky, painter ('greater' Belarus)

== Businesspeople ==
- Michael Marks, co-founder of Marks and Spencers
- Louis B. Mayer, co-founder MGM
- Ralph Lauren, fashion designer, son of Belarusian-Jewish emigrants
- Ida Rosenthal, founder of Maidenform Brassieres, born in Minsk
- David Sarnoff, head of RCA
- Ruslan Kogan
- Gary Vaynerchuk
- Sheryl Sandberg, technology executive, her maternal ancestors came from Vidzy
- Jared Kushner, real estate developer, his paternal grandparents came from Navahrudak
- Michael Bloomberg (founder of Bloomberg L.P.), whose maternal grandfather was an immigrant from what is present-day Belarus.
- Jacob Rutstein, businessman

== Religious leaders ==
=== Rabbis ===
- Naftali Zvi Yehuda Berlin, yeshiva dean of Volozhin Yeshiva
- Eliezer Yehuda Finkel, yeshiva dean of Mir Yeshiva (Belarus)
- Shlomo Harkavy, spiritual dean of Grodno Yeshiva
- Yosef Yozel Horowitz, founder and dean of Novardok Yeshiva
- Yisrael Meir Kagan, author, yeshiva dean, and spiritual leader of world-Jewry
- Boruch Ber Leibowitz, yeshiva dean of Kaminetz Yeshiva
- Isser Zalman Meltzer, rabbi and yeshiva in Slutsk and Jerusalem
- Yisroel Yaakov Lubchansky, spiritual dean of Baranovich Yeshiva
- Aaron of Pinsk, rabbi in Pinsk
- Pesach Pruskin, rabbi and yeshiva dean in Kobrin
- David Rappoport, yeshiva dean of Baranovich Yeshiva
- Shimon Shkop, yeshiva dean of the Grodno Yeshiva
- Chaim Soloveitchik, rabbi in Brest
- Joseph Soloveitchik, rabbi and yeshiva dean in Boston and New York
- Yitzchok Zev Soloveitchik, rabbi in Brest
- Yosef Dov Soloveitchik (Beis Halevi), rabbi in Slutsk and Brest
- Chaim Leib Tiktinsky, yeshiva dean of Mir Yeshiva
- Naftoli Trop, yeshiva dean of Radin Yeshiva
- Chaim Volozhin, yeshiva dean of Volozhin Yeshiva
- Yitzchak Volozhin, yeshiva dean of Volozhin Yeshiva
- Elchonon Wasserman, yeshiva dean of Baranovich Yeshiva
- Shabsi Yogel, yeshiva dean in Slonim and Jerusalem

=== Hasidic rebbes ===
- Chaim Chaykl Levin, rebbe of Amdur
- Aharon Perlow (I), rebbe of Karlin
- Aharon Perlow (II), rebbe of Karlin
- Aharon Perlow of Koidanov, rebbe of Koidanov
- Menachem Mendel Schneersohn, rebbe of Chabad
- Elijah Horowitz-Winograd, scion of Nikolsburg dynasty; rabbi in Lida

== Sportspeople ==
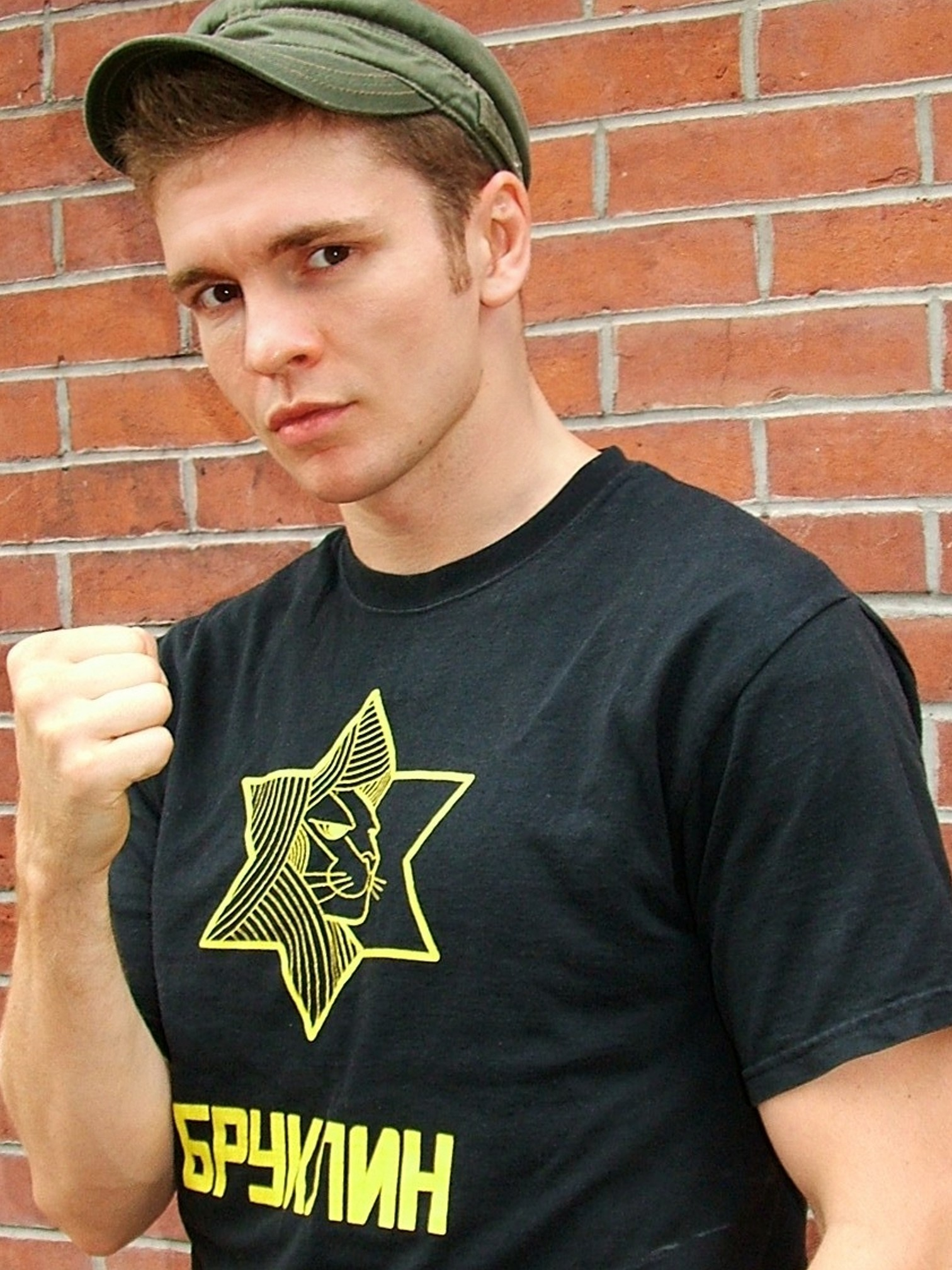
Yuri Foreman

- Elena Altshul, draughts player
- Boris Gelfand, chess player
- Yuri Foreman, boxer
- Victor Mikhalevski, chess player
- Anna Smashnova, tennis player
- Alexandra Zaretsky/Roman Zaretsky, Israeli figure skaters

== Military people ==
- Nahum Eitingon, Soviet spy and NKVD officer
- Tuvia Bielski and Asael Bielski, leaders of a Jewish partisan group (the Bielski partisans) in the World War II
- Yefim Fomin, Political Commissar of 86th Regiment, 6th Rifle Division of the Red Army. Executed without delay by Nazis after being identified as a communist, Jew and commissar upon capture.
- Grigoriy Plaskov, Soviet artillery lieutenant

== Other ==
- Kirk Douglas, of Belarusian Jewish parents
- Jackie Mason, whose parents were Jewish emigrants from Smalyavichy in the Minsk Region
- Lisa Kudrow, her ancestors emigrated from Belarus
- Scarlett Johansson, actress and singer, maternal Jewish grandparents came from Minsk.
- Eliezer Ben-Yehuda, Israeli linguist, father of modern Hebrew language, born in Luzhki near Viciebsk
- Frank Gehry, an architect, his paternal grandmother came from Pinsk
- Harrison Ford, whose maternal grandfathers were Jewish emigrants from Minsk.
- Robert B.G. Horowitz, attorney, whose paternal grandparent were Jewish emigrants from Minsk.
- Sacha Baron Cohen, of Belarusian Jewish grandparents

== See also ==
- List of Jews born in the former Russian Empire
- History of the Jews in Belarus
- Ashkenazi Jews
- Who is a Jew?
