= History of the Jews in Bauska =

Overview of the history of the Jews in Bauska, Latvia

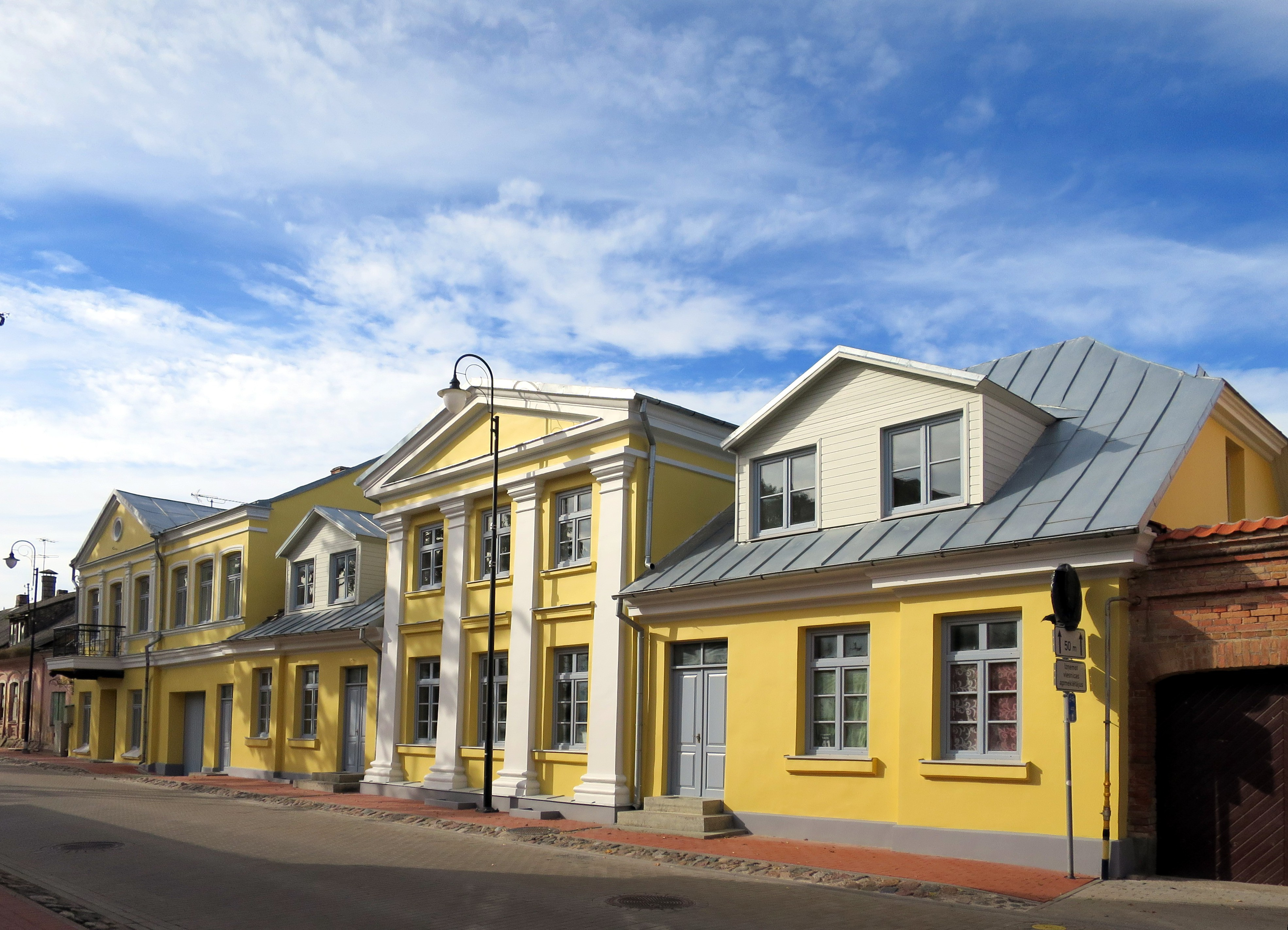
Historic homes in Bauska

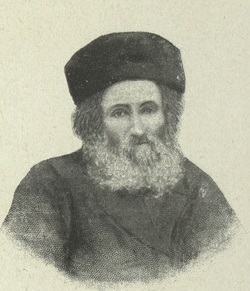
Mordechai Eliasberg

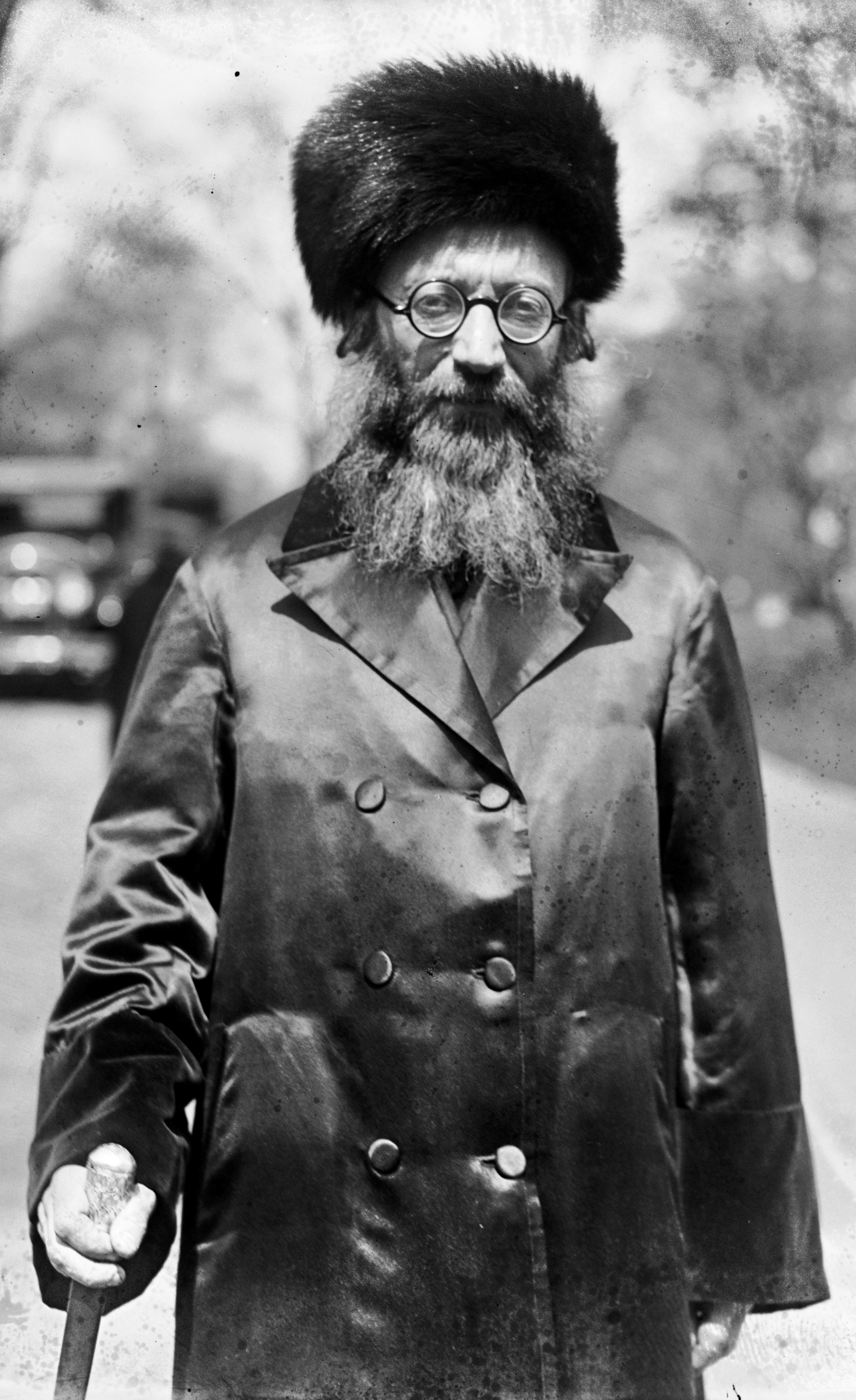
Abraham Isaac Kook

The Bauska Jewish community existed in Bauska from the late 18th century until September 1941. During 19th century it was one of the main ethnic communities of the town and participated in its growth and development. Two pioneers of religious Zionism – Rabbi Mordechai Eliasberg and Rabbi Abraham Isaac Kook - lived and worked here.

== History ==
Jews in the Duchy of Courland and Semigallia first settled in Courland from Germany and were different from Lithuanian Jews. In 1799, after the Duchy was incorporated in the Russian Empire, Jews were officially allowed to live right outside Bauska city limits. Mostly Lithuanian Jews, they were orthodox, and built a wooden synagogue and established a cemetery.

In 1820 Jews were allowed to settle and live in Bauska. For many years they formed the largest group of inhabitants here. They outnumbered Baltic Germans and Latvians, who were still mostly farmers and had not started to move to cities yet.

Bauska was a lively market city and Jewish traders became middlemen between Latvian farmers and larger towns. In return, farmers purchased industrial goods and handicrafts from Jews.

In 1840, 82 Jewish families (692 people) moved to Kherson Governorate to become farmers.

In 1844, a new stone synagogue was built in one corner of the City square.

In 1856, Lubavicher Hasidim established their community in Bauska and built their own house of worship.

In 1881, 3,631 Jews were living in Bauska, making them 60% of the town's population. Many had come illegally from Lithuania, and the population dropped after some were harassed or even expelled.

=== Early 20th century ===
After the beginning of the First World War Russian military authorities ordered all Jews to leave Courland Governorate. Not everyone obeyed, but most Jews did leave and moved to Russia.

Soon after the end of German military occupation and end of the Latvian War of Independence Jewish life in the city resumed. In 1924 Bikur cholim society is legally registered. Hakoah football team actively participates in local competitions.

During the establishment of Latvian Republic the lands of the old Jewish cemetery and the old wooden synagogue became a property of a local farmer, who used it to graze cattle and wanted to tear down the old wooden building for firewood. Jews demanded their rights to the cemetery to be restored but the court case dragged on for many years until they lost in 1935.

In the flood of 1928 the Hasidim prayer house, which was right on the riverbank, was partially destroyed and they started using the main synagogue together with others. During those years Jewish traders and small manufacturers were once again very active. The largest sawmill and electricity plant, which provided Bauska with electricity, belonged to industrialist David Hofschowitz.

After the Soviet occupation of Latvia in 1940 all Jewish organizations and societies were closed. Their property was nationalized. Jewish women's association, support society Bikur cholim and burial association Chevra kadisha were closed.

=== Holocaust ===
Nazi troops reached Bauska on 28 June 1941. Most of the local Jews and some refugees from Lithuania were trapped in the city. Few Jews were publicly shot already in the first days of occupation - on 2 July five Jews, five communists and ten Red army soldiers were shot near the river Mēmele bridge.

On 1 July the curfew was imposed on all inhabitants, but Jews were ordered to stay indoors longer than others – from 6 in the evening until 7 in the morning. On 5 July all Jews between the ages of 18 and 50 were required to register with the German authorities, and also to turn in their radios. A small Jewish ghetto was established.

In mid-July in the city ambulatory 56 Jews, including some boys, were castrated. This was organized by a local doctor, head of the police and head of German army units located in the city. All the remaining Jews were shot starting from 9 August in Vecsaule forest.

Historians estimate that in the nearby woods Germans and their Latvian helpers from Arajs Kommando shot around 500-700 Bauska Jews and 150-200 Jews from nearby villages. On 18 August 1941 there was an ad in the local newspaper that the belongings “left behind” by Jews are to be auctioned off.

== Demography ==
- 2669 Jews in 1835.
- 2226 Jews in 1850.
- 2745 Jews in 1897 (42% of total population).
- 604 Jews in 1920.
- 919 Jews in 1925.

== Notable rabbis ==
- Mordecai ben Abraham Rabbiner, rabbi between 1800 – 1830. Born in 1758 near Bauska. Died in 1830 in Bauska.
- Aaron bar Elhanan Israelson, rabbi between 1830 - 1832. Pupil of Chaim of Volozhin. After Bauska moved to Riga, where he died in 1851.
- Jacov Bendetman, rabbi between 1833 – 1861. Came from a family of Lithuanian rabbis. Died in Bauska.
- Mordecai ben Joseph Eliasberg, rabbi between 1861 – 1889. Studied in Volozhin yeshiva. One of the pioneers of Religious Zionism.
- Ezekiel ben Hillel Lifschiz, rabbi between 1889- 1895. Born in Raseiniai, Lithuania. After Bauska serves as rabbi in Płock and Kalisz.
- Abraham Isaac Kook. Rabbi between 1895 – 1904. The first Ashkenazi chief rabbi of Mandatory Palestine.
- Chaim Yitzchak Bloch Hacohen, rabbi between 1905-1915 and 1920–1922. Born in Lithuania, died in 1948 in USA.
- Moshe Solomon Stul, rabbi from 1924 and apparently until 1941.

== Landmarks ==
- Location of synagogue, Rīgas street 35. Building destroyed during the war. Location of Bauska Jewish memorial, dedicated on 15 October 2017.
- Former kosher slaughterhouse and meat shop, Rīgas street 37. Renovated brick buildings now used as a shop.
- Former Hasid prayer house, Kalna street 2.
- Former yeshiva and house of rabbis, Kalna street 20.
- Former mikveh, Upes street 3.
- Former printing house of Nahman Yankelovich, Rūpniecības street 5. The first Bauska newspaper was printed here by Yankelovich between 1893 and 1915.
