= Moses Proser =

Russian Hebrew writer, journalist and editor

- Born: 1 January 1840; Keidan, Vilna Governorate, Russian Empire
- Died: 1895 (aged 54–55)
- Writing career
- Language: Hebrew

Moses ha-Kohen Proser (Hebrew: מֹשֶׁה הַכֹּהֵן פּראָזער; 1 January 1840 – 1895) was a Russian Hebrew writer, journalist, and editor.

Moses Proser was born at Keidan, near Kovno, where he received a traditional Hebrew education and studied Talmud in various yeshivot. In 1858 he went to Vilna and prepared to enter the Vilna Rabbinical School, but owing to his father's opposition and to his own poor health he was compelled to return home.

In 1863 Proser went to Kovno, where he became private Hebrew instructor, and where he made the acquaintance of Abraham Mapu. Proser began his literary career with contributions to Ha-Melitz, published under the pen names Ezra mi-Har Shafer (עזרא מהר שפר), Ben Amram ha-Prazi (בן עמרם הפרזי), Ani ha-Gever (אני הגבר), and Ha-Ran (הר״ן). In 1870 he went to St. Petersburg and became instructor in the orphanage founded by Baroness A. G. Günzburg, the wife of Baron Horace Günzburg. When Ha-Melitz was established in St. Petersburg in 1871, Proser was appointed editor of the department Be-Artzenu.
