= Saul Shiskes =

Polish rabbinical scholar

- Died: 28 March 1797 Vilna, Vilna Governorate, Russian Empire

Religious life
- Religion: Judaism

Saul ben Judah Löb Shiskes (Yiddish: שאול בן יהודה ליב שיסקעס; died 28 March 1797) was a Polish rabbinical scholar. He was chiefly known as the author of Shevil ha-yashar, on Alfasi, only the first part of which was published (Vilna, 1839). Shiskes acknowledges in the preface that he was assisted in his work by Solomon, the younger brother of Ḥayyim of Volozhin, who annotated it and contributed to some extent to it.
