= Hyman Brodsky =

Hyman Brodsky (August 11, 1852 – February 25, 1937) was a Russian-born American rabbi.

== Life ==
Brodsky was born on August 11, 1852, in Bialystok, Grodno Governorate, Russia, the son of Noah Brodsky. He attended yeshiva in Slonim and Valozhyn. He received rabbinical degrees from Rabbi Hirsch Leib Berlin of Volosin, Rabbi Jacob Widrewitz of Moscow, Rabbi Bernard L. Levinthal of Philadelphia, and Rabbi Samuel Wein of New York City.

Brodsky immigrated to America in 1886 and served as a rabbi in New York City, New York, for several years. He then became rabbi of the Bené Ya'acob Congregation in Philadelphia, Pennsylvania. While there, he served as school board chairman of the Talmud Torah and president of the Independent Chebrah Kadisha. He was also active in encouraging downtown Jews to become American citizens. He also served as rabbi in Cleveland, Ohio, at one point. In 1899, he became rabbi of Congregation Anshei Russia in Newark, New Jersey. He served as rabbi there for nearly forty years, until his death. One source described him as the oldest active rabbi in America by the time he died. He helped establish schools, libraries, sheltering homes, and other institutions, and founded HIAS in New York City. After World War I, he collected $250,000 for the relief of Jewish war victims in Bialystok and travelled to Bialystok in 1919 to deliver the funds there.

Brodsky published and edited the weekly serial Filadelfyer Shtot-Tsaytung in Philadelphia with Khayim Malits, contributed to the Byalistoker Shtime in New York City, and published in the Hebrew-language Hadevora. He wrote two religious works in Hebrew, Maase Hoshev in 1906 and Divre Heshev in 1908. He used pseudonyms in his writings, including "Ḥoshev." He was involved in a number of local organizations, including Beth Israel Hospital, the Daughters of Israel, and the Talmud Torah. While he was a strict Orthodox Jew, he never publicly criticized the Reform and Conservative movement and was occasionally invited to preach in their temples.

Brodsky's wife's name was Sadie. His children were Nathan H., Rae, Beatrice, Florence, Sophie, Hannah, Sarah, and Yetta.

Brodsky died at home on February 25, 1937. He was buried in the congregation cemetery on Grove Street.
