= Shabsi Yogel =

Orthodox Jewish rabbi

Rabbi Shabsi Yogel

Personal life
- Born: 1874/1875 Pieski, Russian Empire
- Died: January 2, 1957
- Spouse: Liba Yogel née Kletzkin
- Parent: R' Avraham Yogel (father)
- Education: Volozhin Yeshiva

Religious life
- Religion: Judaism
- Yeshiva: Slonimer Yeshiva
- Position: Rosh yeshiva
- Yahrtzeit: י' בטבת תשי"ח

Rabbi Shabsi Yogel (Hebrew: שבסי יוגל) was an Orthodox Jewish rabbi in Belarus and Israel. He served as the rosh yeshiva of the Slonim Yeshiva in Europe and after the Holocaust, reestablished it in Ramat Gan, Israel.

== Biography ==
=== Early life ===
Rabbi Yogel was born in Pieski, Russia (currently in the Masty District, Belarus) in 1874 or 1875. He studied first in the Kibbutz HaPerusim in Eišiškės (Eishishok) before going to learn in the Volozhin Yeshiva under the tutelage of Rabbi Naftali Zvi Yehuda Berlin and Rabbi Chaim Soloveitchik. He then went on to marrying Liba, the daughter of Rabbi Eliezer Yosef Kletzkin of Slonim, and settled in the city, where he joined the local kollel founded by Rabbi Yosef Yozel Horowitz.

=== Rabbinic career ===
In 1905, Rabbi Yogel became rosh yeshiva of the Slonim Yeshiva, a yeshiva ketana (yeshiva for younger teenagers) that had been established in the city in the early nineteenth century. As rosh yeshiva, he brought in Rabbi Dovid Bender to serve as menahel (principal), as well as his son, Rabbi Peretz Yogel, who helped him in running the yeshiva. Under his leadership, the yeshiva saw significant growth with its student body numbering between 125 and 175 students in the 1920s. He was also involved in the World Agudath Israel. At the outbreak of World War II, Rabbi Yogel fled to Vilnius and from there, in 1941, to Ramat Gan in Palestine, where he reestablished his yeshiva. In addition, he opened a Bais Yaakov, a cheder, and a kollel, and served on the Moetzes Gedolei HaTorah. He remained at the head of the yeshiva until his death in January 1957.
