= Solomon Salkind =

Lithuanian rabbi and educator (c. 1802–1868)

- Born: c. 1802; Vilna, Vilna Governorate, Russian Empire
- Died: March 14, 1868; Vilna, Vilna Governorate, Russian Empire
- Occupations: Poet, educator
- Writing career
- Language: Hebrew
- Literary movement: Haskalah

Solomon Salkind (Hebrew: שלמה זלמן בן־יהושע זאלקינד; c. 1802 – March 14, 1868) was a Lithuanian Hebrew poet and educator.

In 1841, together with Mordecai Aaron Günzburg, Salkind founded the first secular Jewish school in Lithuania. In 1847, he was appointed lecturer at the newly established Vilna Rabbinical Seminary, where he remained until his death.

His literary contributions include the poetry collections Shirim li-Shelomoh (Vilna, 1842), containing poems adaptated from other languages, as well as Ḳol Shelomoh (Vilna, 1858) and Shema' Shelomoh (Vilna, 1866). Many of Salkind's Hebrew speeches were published in the Ḳovetz Derushim (Vilna, 1864), a collection of addresses by teachers of the Seminary, published with the support of the Russian government. He also published numerous articles in Pirḥe tsafon, Hakarmel and Hamagid.

According to some accounts, Salkind's son was Isaac Edward Salkinson, who converted to Protestantism and became a missionary to the Jews.

== Publications ==
- Shirim le-Shelomoh. Vilna: Romm. 1842.
- Ḳol Shelomoh. Vilna: Romm. 1858.
- Shema' Shelomoh. Vilna: Romm. 1866.
