= Valozhyn-Tarasovo Death Road =

1941 NKVD execution of prisoners

The Valozhyn-Tarasovo Death Road refers to the compelled evacuation of inmates from the prison in the city of Valozhyn, located in occupied Poland (present-day Belarus). This evacuation, orchestrated by the NKVD following the German invasion of the USSR, commenced on the night of June 24–25, 1941. It concluded within two days, with nearly all prisoners being executed by Soviet guards near the village of Tarasovo, close to Minsk. The death toll from this massacre reached approximately one hundred. This atrocity was one among many prisoner massacres carried out by the Soviet secret police and army during the summer of 1941.

== Background ==
During the interwar period, Valozhyn (Belarusian: Валожын, Polish: Wołożyn) was located within the borders of the Second Polish Republic and served as the center of the Valozhyn county in Nowogródek Voivodeship. After the German-Soviet invasion of Poland in 1939, the city fell under Soviet occupation.

The NKVD detained individuals were confined in the basements of the former Border Protection Corps barracks, repurposed as both a prison and the headquarters of the local NKVD outpost following the onset of the occupation. Prison in Valozhyn operated primarily as a remand center and was among seven Soviet prisons in the Baranovichi Oblast. Soviet official documents referred to it as "Prison No. 12". This facility typically housed an average of about 200 prisoners.

On June 22, 1941, Nazi Germany commenced its invasion of the Soviet Union. With the rapid advancement of the German offensive, the NKVD initiated the extermination of political prisoners within the war zone. In the summer of 1941, within the part of Poland occupied by the USSR, an estimated 20,000 to 30,000 individuals in prisons and detention centers were murdered.

The "death marches" or "death roads" were a characteristic method used to liquidate Soviet prisons in present-day Western Belarus. Prisoners were forcibly taken from their cells and compelled to march eastwards under scorching summer conditions for several days. This 'evacuation' method led to mass deaths among prisoners due to exhaustion, hunger, and thirst, some falling victim to German air raids, while others were massacred by Soviet guards.

== The death march ==
According to documents from Soviet archives, as of June 10, 1941, the prison in Valozhyn held 143 inmates. Additional NKVD records from June 1941, concerning the planned evacuation of the prison, indicated an intended evacuation of 141 inmates.

The liquidation of the prison commenced on the night of June 24-25, 1941. All criminal prisoners were released, while approximately a hundred (Note: This number is the most commonly cited figure in historical sources. Nevertheless, according to one version, only 50-60 prisoners were evacuated to the east. See: Criminal evacuation (1997), p. 98.) political prisoners were assembled into a column and forced to move eastward on foot. Their route passed through Piaršai and Rakaw toward Minsk. By noon on June 26, the column had covered approximately 60 kilometers. Two hours later, when the prisoners were within 12 kilometers of Minsk, they were directed to a forest near the village of Tarasovo.

In a small ravine, the prisoners were instructed to sit down, ostensibly to rest. They were arranged in rows of 7-10 people, forming a quadrangle. They were instructed to sit in a manner where one person sat between the legs of the prisoner from the row behind, while being embraced by that prisoner's arms. Meanwhile, two machine guns were positioned behind the crowd. Around dozen of prisoners realized the NKVD's intent for execution and attempted to escape. The remaining prisoners were then machine-gunned, and those showing signs of life were finished off by the guards.

Approximately 100 prisoners perished in the massacre. Fifteen individuals managed to escape from the execution site, but two disappeared on their return west, while one succumbed to injuries after reaching home.

The NKVD's decision to murder the prisoners was likely triggered by the news that German troops had taken Minsk, resulting in a blockade of the evacuation routes to the east.

== Bibliography ==
- Musiał, Bogdan (2001). Rozstrzelać elementy kontrrewolucyjne. Brutalizacja wojny niemiecko-sowieckiej latem 1941 roku [Shoot the counter-revolutionary elements. The brutalization of the German-Soviet war in the summer of 1941] (in Polish). Warszawa: Stowarzyszenie Kulturalne Fronda. ISBN 83-88747-40-1.
- Popiński, Krzysztof; Kokurin, Aleksandr; Gurjanow, Aleksandr (1995). Drogi śmierci. Ewakuacja więzień sowieckich z Kresów Wschodnich II Rzeczypospolitej w czerwcu i lipcu 1941 [Roads of death. Evacuation of Soviet prisons from the Eastern Borderlands of the Second Polish Republic in June and July 1941] (in Polish). Warszawa: Wydawnictwo "Karta". ISBN 83-900676-9-2.
- Zbrodnicza ewakuacja więzień i aresztów NKWD na Kresach Wschodnich II Rzeczypospolitej w czerwcu – lipcu 1941 roku. Materiały z sesji naukowej w 55. rocznicę ewakuacji więźniów NKWD w głąb ZSRR, Łódź 10 czerwca 1996 r. [Criminal evacuation of NKVD prisons and detention centers in the Eastern Borderlands of the Second Polish Republic in June-July 1941. Materials from the scientific session on the 55th anniversary of the evacuation of NKVD prisoners deep into the USSR, Łódź, June 10, 1996] (in Polish). Warszawa: Główna Komisja Badania Zbrodni przeciwko Narodowi Polskiemu – Instytut Pamięci Narodowej. 1997. ISBN 83-903356-6-2.
