= Isaac Edward Salkinson =

Hebrew translator (1820–1883)

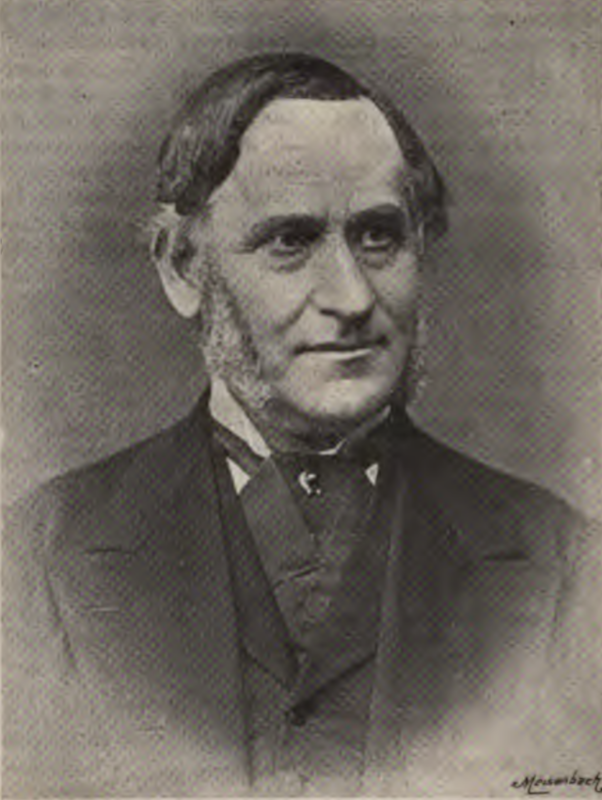
- Born: 1820; Vilna, Vilna Governorate, Russian Empire
- Died: June 5, 1883 (aged 62–63); Vienna, Austria-Hungary
- Writing career
- Pen name: J. E. S. (י. ע. ס.)
- Language: Hebrew
- Movement: Haskalah

Isaac Edward Salkinson (Yiddish: יצחק אליעזר סאלקינסאָן; 1820 – June 5, 1883) was a Lithuanian Hebrew writer and translator, considered "one of the finest translators of the Haskalah." He was a convert to Christianity who became a missionary for the Church.

== Biography ==
Salkinson was born into an Orthodox Jewish family in Vilna in 1820. (Note: According to some accounts, his father was the poet Solomon Salkind. However, Salkind died in 1868, conflicting with accounts that Salkinson's father died when he was a child.) His father died when he was young, as did his mother seven years later. He then set out for America with the intention of entering a rabbinical seminary there. While in London, however, he was met by agents of the London Missionary Society and was persuaded to forsake Judaism. Baptized soon afterward, in 1849 he entered the college of that society, where he studied for four years.

His first appointment was as missionary to the Jews in Edinburgh, where he became a student at Divinity Hall. He was ordained a minister of the Presbyterian Church in Glasgow in 1859. He served his church as a missionary in various towns, including Presburg, and finally settled in Vienna in 1876.

== Work ==
Salkinson was encouraged to translate classical Western literature into Hebrew by C. D. Ginsburg, who "thought that the Jews, who love the Hebrew language, would read [...] classical Christian work[s], though they would refuse to read an ordinary Christian religious book." Though many of his translations were clearly intended for missionary purposes, others were done for purely artistic reasons, and he maintained a relationship with the Maskilic writer Peretz Smolenskin.

Among his early translations was James Barr Walker's Philosophy of the Plan of Salvation, published under the title Sod ha-yeshuʻah (Altona, 1858). He also translated Milton's Paradise Lost, under the title Va-yegaresh et ha-adam (Vienna, 1871); Shakespeare's Othello and Romeo and Juliet, under the titles Iti'el ha-Kushi (ib. 1874; preface by Smolenskin) and Ram ve-Ya'el (ib. 1878); and Tiedge's Urania, under the title Ben Ḳohelet (ib. 1876). His translation of the New Testament was published posthumously under the supervision of Ginsburg in Vienna in 1886.

== Selected publications ==
- Sod ha-yeshuʻah [Philosophy of the Plan of Salvation]. Altona: Bonn & Brother. 1858.
- Va-yegaresh et ha-adam [Paradise Lost]. Vienna: s.n. 1871.
- Itiʼel ha-Kushi [Othello]. Vienna: Spitzer & Holzwarth. 1874.
- Ben Ḳohelet [Urania]. Vienna: G. Brög. 1876.
- Ram ve-Ya'el [Romeo and Juliet]. Vienna: G. Brög. 1878.
- Ha-Berit ha-ḥadashah [The New Testament]. Vienna. 1886.
