= Shmuel Alexandrov =

Belarusian philosopher and anarchist

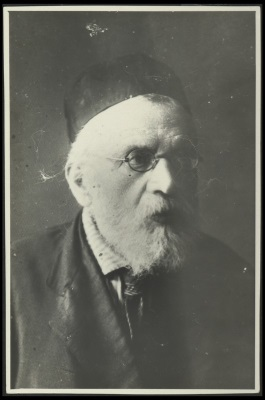
- Shmuel Alexandrov c. 1920
- Born: 26 December 1865; Borisov, Russian Empire
- Died: 7 November 1941 (aged 75); Babruysk, Reichskommissariat Ostland

Philosophical work
- Era: 20th-century philosophy
- Region: Jewish philosophy
- School: Jewish Mysticism; Chabad philosophy

Rabbi Shmuel Alexandrov of Bobruisk (Hebrew: שמואל אלכסנדרוב; 1865–1941) was a prominent student of the Volozhin Yeshiva, who became close to the tradition of Chabad Hasidism. Alexandrov was a Jewish Orthodox mystical thinker, philosopher and anarchist, whose religious thought, an original blending of Kabbalah, Orthodox Judaism, contemporary philosophy and secular literature, are marked by universalism and some degree of antinomianism. His works include פך השמן ("the Oil Jug"), a commentary on Pirkey Avot, and a large collection of essays, מכתבי מחקר וביקורת ("Letters of Research and Investigation"). Alexandrov was influenced by the anarchistic implications of the work of Rav Kook (the first Ashkenazi chief rabbi of the British Mandate for Palestine), from which he sought to derive practical instruction. Another influence on Alexandrov was Russian philosopher Vladimir Solovyov. Alexandrov lived all his life in Bobruisk and was murdered in the Holocaust.

== See also ==
- Anarchism and Orthodox Judaism
- Jewish anarchism
