= Chaim Yitzchak Bloch Hacohen =

Lithuanian rabbi and Head of Rabbinical Court of New Jersey (1864–1948)

Hayyim Yitzhak HaCohen Bloch
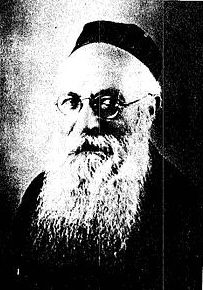
- Born: Hayyim Yitzhak Bloch; October 21, 1864; Plungė, Lithuania
- Died: March 18, 1948 (aged 83); Jersey City, New Jersey
- Resting place: Riverside Cemetery, Saddle Brook, NJ
- Citizenship: United States
- Education: Yeshivas Grubin (Kelm), Yeshivas Volozhin
- Occupations: Rabbi, Scholar, Community Activist
- Spouse: Hannah Schmidt
- Children: Abraham, Max, Leo, Benjamin, Jona Sheftel ("Sam"), Elias, Ruth, Shaina Henna
- Writing career
- Language: Yiddish, Hebrew, Russian
- Genres: Talmudics, Jewish Thought, Jewish Law
- Notable awards: Honorary President of the Union of Orthodox Rabbis of the United States and Canada

Hayyim Yitzhak HaCohen Bloch (Hebrew: חיים יצחק בלוך הכהן; 1864–1948) was a prominent Lithuanian born rabbi. In 1922 he left Latvia for the United States, where he became the Rabbi and Av Beit Din (head judge of religious court) of Jersey City, New Jersey. He remained there until his death in 1948.

== Youth ==
Bloch was born in Plungė, Lithuania, on October 21, 1864, to an illustrious rabbinic family with family roots traced back to the Shakh and Isaiah Horowitz. Until the age of 15, Bloch was taught Torah by his father, Rabbi Hanoch Zundel Bloch Hacohen, the local shochet of the town. After his 15th birthday, Bloch left Plunge to study Torah by Rav Simha Zissel in Yeshivat Grobin. Unique in its time, the Yeshivah at Grobin had a dual curriculum of Jewish and Secular studies. Under the guidance of Rav Simcha Zissel, the young teenager grew very diligent in his Torah study and rose to an advanced level in Talmud. Rav Simcha Zissel heavily emphasized the study of Mussar, which had a profound impact on young Bloch's personality for the rest of his life.

== Formative years ==
At the age of 18, Hayyim Bloch decided to leave Grobin and learn instead in the famed Volozhin Yeshiva under the illustrious Rabbi Hayyim Soloveitchik, the founder of the "Brisker Derech", and Rabbi Naftali Zvi Yehuda Berlin-the "Neziv". Rabbi Solovietchik had a deep love and admiration for his young disciple, and Bloch studied under him for seven years. In 1890, at the age of 25, Bloch was granted semikha by his teacher, Rabbi Hayyim Solovietchik, as well as by the Telzer Rosh Yeshiva, Harav Eliezer Gordon. While in Volozhin, Bloch devoted much of his time to a study of the Ritba's commentary on the Talmud. For Bloch, the Ritba became his "master and teacher" in Talmud, and he was almost able to render his commentary on the Talmud by heart. As a yeshivah student, Bloch wrote for the Slutzk journal, Yagdil Torah, as well as Migdal Torah, another Talmudic based periodical. Although Bloch spent most of his time in Volozhin immersed in the intellectually stimulating world of conceptual talmudic study, he also (like many students in Volozhin at this time) explored other areas of thought, most notably the Haskala. While in Volozhin, Bloch began writing for the Warsaw pro-Zionist pro Haskala daily, Ha-Zefirah, and in 1887 at the age of 22, became editor of the column Wisdom of Israel.

== Rosh Yeshiva of Plunge Yeshiva ==
If Bloch had left his hometown of Plunge as a promising adolescent of 15, he returned in 1891 an accomplished talmudic scholar with rabbinic ordination from a European Yeshiva and a primary disciple of Rabbi Hayyim Solovietchik - a rising star on the European rabbinic scene. In the year 1895, Bloch founded a Yeshiva in Plunge for elite high-school aged students. He was the Rosh Yeshiva and primary talmudic instructor at the Yeshiva for four years. Rabbinical faculty members included Rabbi Shlomo Itzel, Rabbi Zelig, and Rabbi Ben-Zion Feldman. During his tenure as Rosh Yeshiva, he oversaw the development of numerous budding torah scholars, including the future Ponevhzer Rav, Rav Yosef Kahaneman. Bloch recognized Kahaneman's potential as a future leader of Jewry and showered him with special attention and praise. Bloch taught the young Kahaneman at a pace appropriate for his abilities and age, and is credited as being the teacher who inspired Kahaneman to greatness in Torah learning.

== Palongen Rabbinate ==
After serving for four years as the Rosh Yeshivah of the Yeshiva in Plunge, Bloch was appointed the communal rabbi and Av Beit Din (head of Jewish court) of nearby Palanga, a seaside town on the shore of the Baltic. Bloch was also the officially appointed government Rabbi. A year into his position as Rabbi, Bloch heard that his prized disciple Yosef Kahanemen had not gotten into the Telz Yeshiva. Bloch invited his student to Palongen to study with him, and after a year of assisting the budding scholar in his talmudics, Kahanemen applied to Telz and was accepted.

== Bauska Rabbinate ==
Following the departure of Rabbi Abraham Isaac Kook to head the Chief Rabbinate of Israel in 1904, the Bauska Jewish community decided to elect Rabbi Bloch as his successor. Bauska, a town in the Courland Governorate, (now Latvia) was at the time under Russian control and had Russian residence laws on the books which precluded Lithuanian Jews from residing within Courland. Bloch, a Lithuanian, succeeded in receiving rights of residence by filling the then vacant position of government district rabbi, known in Russian as the "Kazyonny Ravvin". To receive this position, Bloch completed the equivalent of a six-year secondary school education. Bloch was the only Russian rabbi to hold the dual post of communal rabbi and kazyonny ravvin. Among the many duties of the kazyonny ravvin was the delivering of patriotic speeches on festivals and birthdays of the czars. They also supervised Jewish government schools, administered the oath to those who had been enlisted into the Russian army, and kept the records of births, marriages, and deaths in their communities. He was Bauska rabbi from 1904 until 1915 and again from 1920 until 1922.

== Scholarly works ==
Bloch was not only a beloved pulpit rabbi, but also a scholar of great erudition. Below is a list of Seforim (books) on Talmud, Halachah, and Ethics that Rabbi Bloch authored.

- Divrei Hibah on Hidushei Haritba Mesechet Moed Katan (1935)
- Divrei Hibah on Hidushei Haritba Mesechet Meggilah (1937)
- Divrei Hibah on Hidushei Haritba Mesechet Makkot (1939)
- Divrei Hibah on Halachah(1941)
- Kovez Klalim (1934)- A Treatise on Stare Decisis in Jewish Law
- Ha-Moakh Ve-Ha-Lev (1935) - An ethical-philosophical work
- Likutei Harayiv (1904) (Anonymous)
- Hamavhin (1928) (Anonymous)

== Continuation of legacy ==
Rabbi Bloch's son, Rabbi Abraham P. Bloch was ordained at the Rabbi Issac Elchanan Theological Seminary and consequently became the Rabbi of Temple Petach Tikvah in Crown Heights. He also authored numerous scholarly books such as "Day by Day in Jewish History", "Midrashic Comments on the Torah", and " A book of Jewish Ethical Concepts." Rabbi Abraham Bloch also continued in the tradition of his father by blending his pulpit duties with communal activism.
