= Isidore Goldblum =

Hebrew whiter and bibliographer

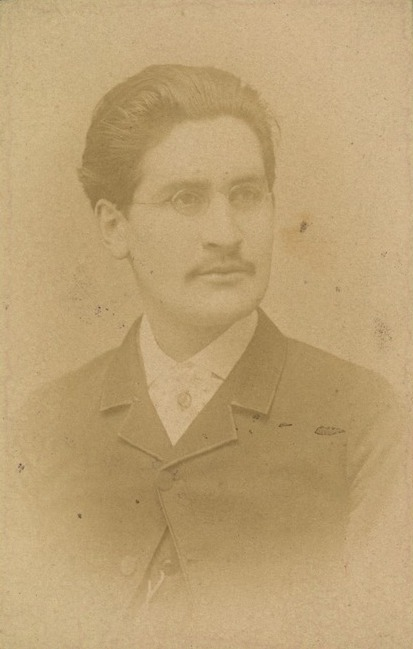
- Born: Israel Isser Goldblum; 26 June 1863; Neishtot Shaki, Prussia
- Died: 2 March 1925 (aged 61); Antwerp, Belgium
- Writing career
- Pen name: Peraḥ Zahav, Yafaz
- Language: Hebrew

Isidore Israel Goldblum (Hebrew: ישראל איסר גולדבלום, Israel Isser Goldblum; 26 June 1863 – 2 March 1925), also known by the pen names Peraḥ Zahav (Hebrew: פרח זהב) and Yafaz (Hebrew: יאפ״ז), was a Hebrew writer and bibliographer.

== Biography ==
Isidore Israel Goldblum was born to a Jewish family in the town of Neishtot Shaki, where he received a traditional religious education. He studied at the yeshivot of Eyshishok, Volozhin, and Pressburg, and later studied Jewish law under Dr. Ze'ev Feilchenfeld in Poyzn.

He devoted himself to the study and publication of Hebrew manuscripts in Berlin, Paris, London, Oxford, and Rome, publishing his research mainly in the periodical Ha-Maggid. In 1891 he wrote Vie et Œuvres de rabbi Elia Bahur le Grammairien, a short biography of Elye Bokher. That same year he published Ma'amar Bikkoret Sefarim, and released his Mi-Ginzei Yisrael be-Paris in 1894. He corresponded with the leading Jewish scholars of his time and published a collection of these letters (Kevutzat Mikhtavim, 1895).
