= Vilna Rabbinical School and Teachers' Seminary =

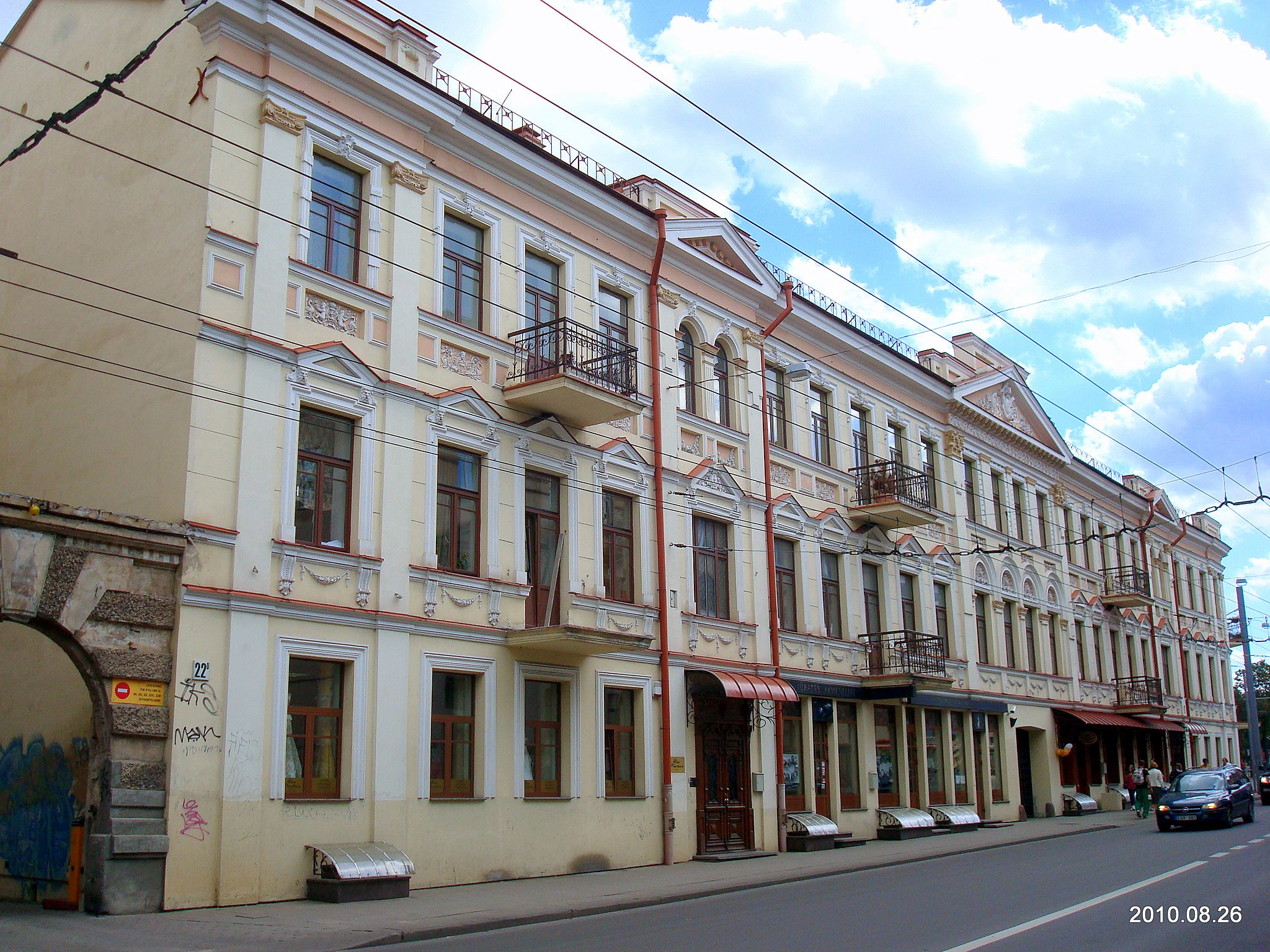
Pylimo Street No. 22 D - The building of the former rabbinical seminary in Vilnius

The Vilna Rabbinical School and Teachers' Seminary was a controversial Russian state-sponsored institution to train Jewish teachers and rabbis, located in Vilna, Russian Empire. The school opened in 1847 with two divisions: a rabbinical school and a teachers' seminary. The Rabbinical School was closed in 1873 and the Teachers' Seminary closed in 1914. The school taught secular studies, unlike the traditional cheders and yeshivas. This new curriculum, as well as the government control, made the school "unpopular."

== Curriculum ==
The school taught German language, Hebrew language, Hebrew Bible, Talmud, algebra, geometry, trigonometry, physics, astronomy, world history, Russian history, Russian language, geography, and handwriting and drawing.

== History ==
Rabbi Yisroel Salanter, a major figure of the Mussar movement who then lived in Vilna, was pressured to lead the seminary. Rather than accept the position, Salanter fled to Kovno, even though Rabbi Yitzhak of Volozhin encouraged him to take the position.

In 1872, a secret Narodnik study group was formed by Aaron Zundelevich. Vladimir Jochelson was a member of this group.

== Faculty and students ==
Many prominent maskilim studied or taught in the school.

Notable faculty included:

- Leibele Antokolier (a.k.a. Arieh-Leib b. Akiba Luria, "The Keidan Genius")
- Shmuel Yosef Feunn (author, maskil, and educator)
- Aaron Samuel Liebermann
- Solomon Salkind (1806 – March 14, 1868), author of Shirim li-Shelomoh, Kol Shelomoh, and Shema Shelomoh.

Notable students included:

- Vladimir Jochelson, Russian ethnographer
