= Yitzhak of Volozhin =

Belarusian Orthodox rabbi and rosh yeshiva

HagRIts Yitzhak ben Chaim of Volozhin
- Title: Rabbi

Personal life
- Born: Yitzchak Ickovits; 1780 Volozhin, Polish–Lithuanian Commonwealth
- Died: 16 June 1849 (aged 68–69) Ivenets, Minsk Oblast, Russian Empire
- Parent: Chaim of Volozhin (father)

Religious life
- Religion: Judaism
- Denomination: Orthodox Judaism
- Yeshiva: Volozhin Yeshiva
- Position: Rosh yeshiva

Yitzhak of Volozhin (also known as Rabbi Yitzhak ben Chaim of Volozhin, Rabbi Itsele Volozhiner, and HagRIts; 1780 – 16 June 1849) was a rosh yeshiva of the Volozhin Yeshiva.

== Biography ==
Yitzhak was born in 1780 in Volozhin, Polish–Lithuanian Commonwealth to rabbi Chaim Ickovits of Volozhin. As Rosh Yeshiva, his father taught him in the Volozhin Yeshiva, making him one of his closest disciples in Torah.

Yitzhak would later become a teacher there during his father's lifetime and inherit the position of Rosh Yeshiva after his father's death. He would also name the yeshivah Eitz Chaim in honor of his father. He would earn the acronym HagRIts, Hagaon Rabbi Itskhak, according to rabbi Baruch Epstein. He would continue to operate the yeshiva after it was officially closed by government authorities in 1824, making a name for himself as a misnaged figure.

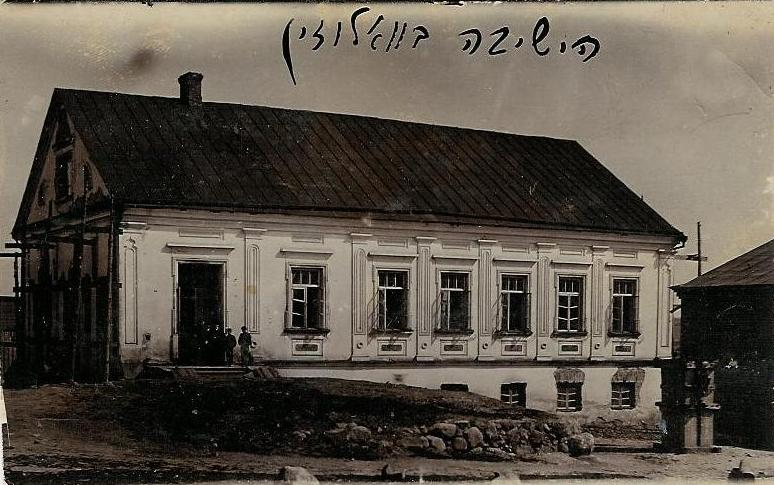
Photo of the Volozhin Yeshiva

In 1843 Yitzhak would attend a government convened conference on reforming Jewish education. The government, under the leadership of Tsar Nicholas I and Minister of Education Count Sergey Semionovich Uvarov, sought to push russification on the Jewish population through their agent Max Lilienthal. In the face of this, Yitzchak defended the Orthodox position, alongside leaders such as the Third Lubavitcher Rebbe, and would make a positive impression on Count Uvarov. Where the Lubavitcher Rebbe was putting up a desperate defense, claiming that the Jewish people's spiritual concerns supersede the Czar's government, Yitzhak presented the misnagdim as fearful of being brushed aside by the government and made attempts to achieve concessions from the Russian government without surrendering Jewish identity and values. Yitzchak argued that public school would be a danger to Jewish upbringing and that the Jewish people needed more political rights.

Yitzhak died on 16 June 1849 in Ivenets. Rabbi Eliezer Fried, the husband of one of his daughters, would succeed Yitzhak as Rosh Yeshiva. Rabbi Naftali Zvi Yehuda Berlin, a second son in law of Yitzhak, would succeed Rabbi Fried.
