= Aaron of Pinsk =

Belarusian rabbi (died 1841)

Aaron of Pinsk, also Aharon Kretinger, was a rabbi in Kretinga, in the Kovno Governorate, and afterward in Pinsk, where he died in 1841. He wrote Tosafot Aharon, in which he attempted to solve the questions of the Tosafists in various Talmudic treatises, notably in Zera'im, Mo'ed, and Niddah. The book, which contains also scholastic and cabalistic discourses, was printed in 1858.
