= Volozhin Yeshiva =

School in Belarus

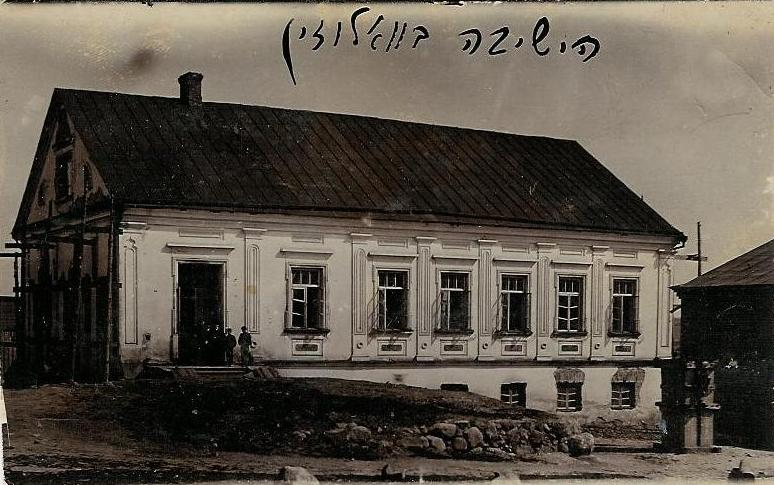
- Photograph of the Volozhin yeshiva
- Other names: Yeshivas Etz Ḥayyim
- Active: 1803–1939
- Founders: Ḥayyim of Volozhin
- Religious affiliation: Judaism
- Rosh yeshiva: Ḥayyim of Volozhin; Isaac of Volozhin; Eliezer Isaac Fried; Naftali Zvi Yehuda Berlin; Raphael Shapira; Jacob Shapira; Ḥayyim Wulkin
- Location: Volozhin, Vilna Governorate (now Minsk Region), Russian Empire (now Belarus); 54.0910°N 26.5279°E

Yeshivas Etz Ḥayyim (Hebrew: ישיבת עץ חיים, romanized: Yešivaṯ ʿēṣ ḥayyim, lit. 'Tree of Life Yeshiva'), commonly called the Volozhin Yeshiva (Yiddish: וואלאזשינער ישיבה), was a prestigious Litvish yeshiva located in the town of Volozhin in the Russian Empire (now Valozhyn, Belarus). It was founded around 1803 by Chayim Volozhiner, a student of the famed Vilna Gaon, and trained several generations of scholars, rabbis, and leaders. It is considered the first modern yeshiva, and served as a model for later Misnagdic educational institutions.

The institution reached its zenith under the leadership of Rabbi Naftali Zvi Yehuda Berlin, who became rosh yeshiva in 1854. In 1892, demands of the Russian authorities to increase secular studies forced the yeshiva to close. It re-opened on a smaller scale in 1899 and functioned until the outbreak of World War II in 1939. During the War German soldiers used the building as a stable, and it was subsequently converted into a canteen and deli. The site was returned to the Jewish community of Belarus in 1989. It is considered a cultural and architectural landmark, and in 1998, the Volozhin Yeshiva was registered on the State List of Historical and Cultural Monuments of the Republic of Belarus.

== History ==
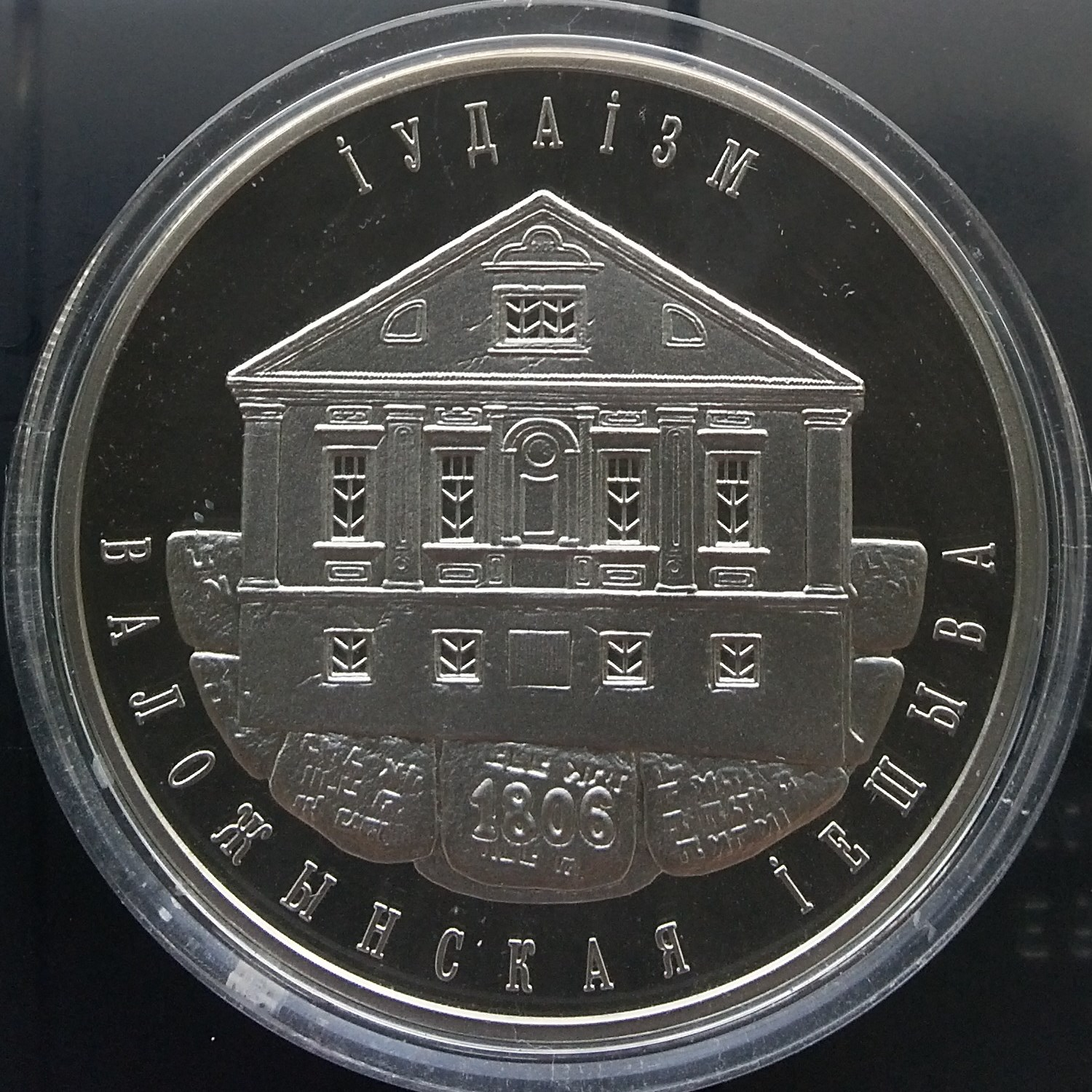
Volozhin yeshiva. Silver coin of Belarus, 10 rubles, 2010, 925, diam. 33 mm, revers

The Volozhin Yeshiva was founded around 1803 (potentially, as late as 1807) by Chayim Volozhiner. After he died in 1821, his son, Yitzhak of Volozhin, succeeded him as head of the yeshiva. When Isaac died in 1849, Eliezer Fried was appointed rosh yeshiva with Naftali Zvi Yehuda Berlin as his assistant.

Fried died soon after, in 1854, whereupon Berlin became the new head along with Yosef Dov Soloveitchik Beis Halevi, Chayim Volozhiner's great-grandson, who was the assistant rosh yeshiva. In 1865, Soloveichik left to become a rabbi in Slutsk. The Volozhin yeshiva closed in 1892, because of the Russian Empire's demand for a dramatic increase in the amount of time spent teaching certain secular studies.

According to some, the pressure from the Russian government was due to the Maskilim accusing the yeshiva of being subversive.

The biography of Chayim Soloveitchik states that secular studies were taught briefly but were barely attended. However, these were concessions legally mandated that the roshe yeshivas felt were necessary rather than shutting down the yeshiva. When the government imposed extreme guidelines, Berlin refused to comply and allowed the government to close the yeshiva. "All teachers of all subjects must have college diplomas... no Judaic subjects may be taught between 9 AM and 3 PM ... no night classes are allowed ... total hours of study per day may not exceed ten."

Historian Shaul Stampfer and others maintain that the root of the problem was Berlin's attempt to install his son as rosh yeshiva in the face of opposition. Russian government documents that have recently come to light indicate that this was a consideration in the yeshiva's closure.

Refael Shapiro, the son-in-law of Naftali Zvi Yehuda Berlin, reopened the yeshiva in 1899, albeit on a smaller scale. It remained open until World War II, and was re-established on a small scale in Mandatory Palestine, later Israel after the war. From 1886 through 1991, alumni of this yeshiva and their descendants ran a synagogue on the Lower East Side of Manhattan in New York City that carried the name of this yeshiva.

== Threat of repossession ==
In 2000, the Valozhyn authorities returned the building to the Jewish Religious Union of Belarus, an Orthodox Jewish umbrella organization. In 2007, the government of Belarus threatened to repossess the building unless the community raised $20,000 in order to renovate it. The Jewish community in America took action and Agudath Israel raised money to restore the site. The yeshiva building is presently undergoing restoration through the partnership of Yad Yisroel and the Union of Religious Congregations of the Republic of Belarus.

== Faculty ==
=== Rosh Yeshiva ===
- Chayim Volozhiner - founding Rosh Yeshiva (1803-1821)
- Yitzhak of Volozhin - son of Chayim (1813-1849)
- Eliezer Yitzchak Fried - son of Hillel, son-in-law of Yitzchak (1849-1854)
- Naftali Zvi Yehuda Berlin - son-in-law of Yitzchak (1854-1892)

=== Assistant Rosh Yeshiva ===
- Yechiel Michel of Minsk - author of Zecher L'Yisrael (ca. 1803–1810)
- Hillel Fried - son-in-law of Chaim (1803-1813)
- Yosef Dov Soloveitchik Beysaleyvi - great-grandson of Chaim (1854-1865)
- Chaim Hillel Fried - son of Eliezer Yitzchak (1865-1867)
- Refael Shapiro - son-in-law of the Naftali Zvi Yehuda Berlin (1870-1881)
- Chaim Soloveitchik - son-in-law of Refael (1881-1892)
- Chaim Berlin - son of the Naftali Zvi Yehuda Berlin (1890-1892)

=== Rashei Yeshiva post-relocation ===
- Refael Shapiro - son-in-law of the Netziv (1895-1915)
- Yaakov Shapiro - son of Refael (1922-1936)
- Chaim Walkin - son-in-law of Yaakov (1936-1940)

== Notable alumni ==
Many scholars became renowned following their time learning in Volozhin. Among them are:

- Shmuel Alexandrov
- Meir Bar-Ilan
- Zelig Reuven Bengis
- Micha Josef Berdyczewski
- Naftali Zvi Yehuda Berlin
- Hayim Nahman Bialik
- Hyman Brodsky
- Pinkhos Churgin
- David Cohen
- Baruch Epstein
- Moshe Mordechai Epstein
- Ben Zion Goldberg
- Isidore Goldblum
- Chaim Ozer Grodzinski
- Chaim Yitzchak Bloch Hacohen
- Abraham Harkavy
- Shmuel Yitzchak Hillman
- Sender Jarmulowsky
- Jacob Joseph
- Nachum Kaplan
- Chaim Mordechai Katz
- Abraham Isaac Kook
- Moyshe Kulbak
- Boruch Ber Leibowitz
- Yehudah Leib Levin
- Abraham Liessin
- Zvi Hirsch Masliansky
- Elya Chaim Meisels
- Isser Zalman Meltzer
- Samuel Mohilever
- John Paley
- Yitzhak Isaac Halevy Rabinowitz
- Yitzchak Yaacov Reines
- Mnachem Risikoff
- Zundel Salant
- Kalman Schulman
- Refael Shapiro
- Shimon Shkop
- Chaim Soloveitchik
- Aaron Samuel Tamares
- Kalman Zev Wissotzky

== Gallery ==
Volozhin yeshiva

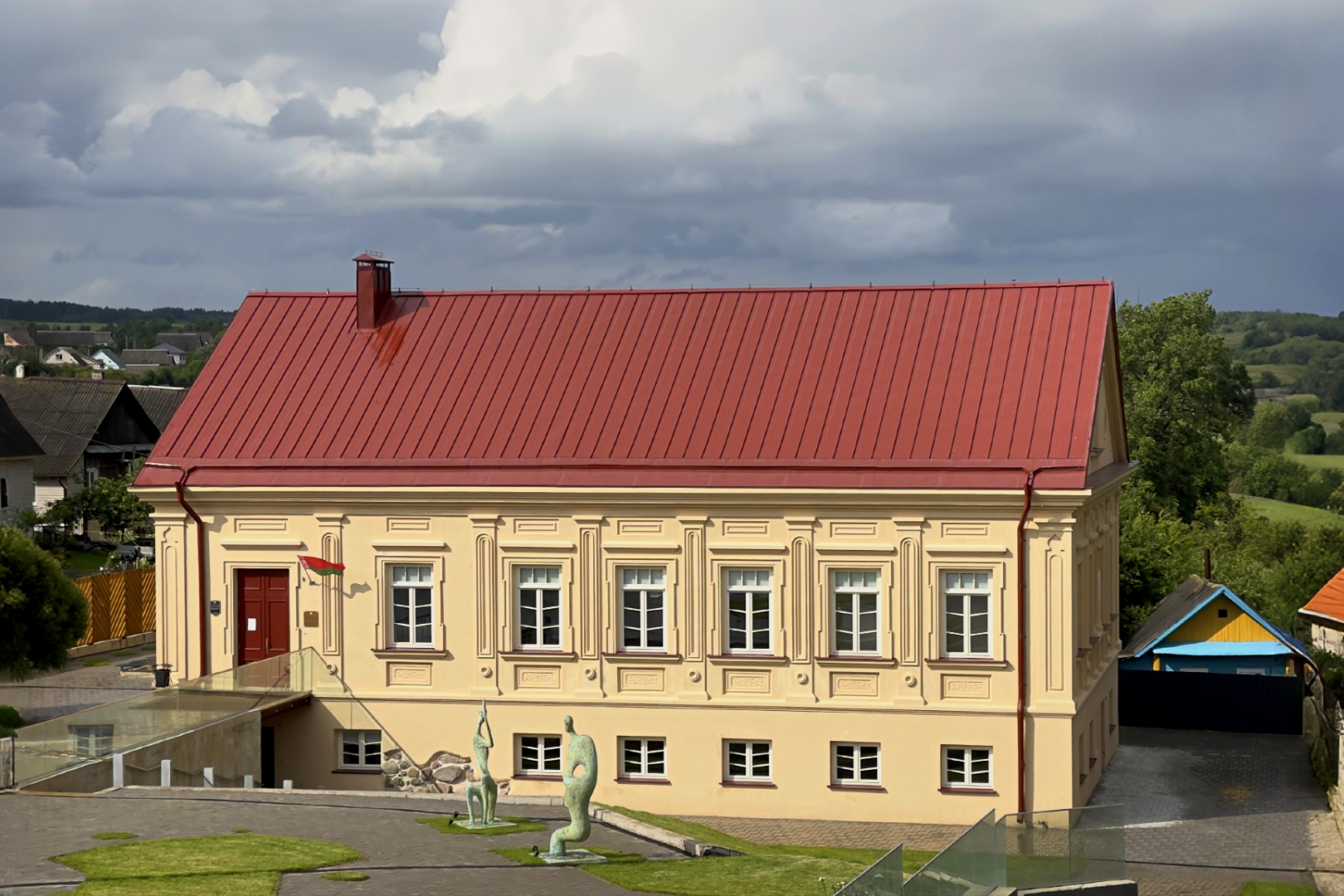
2025

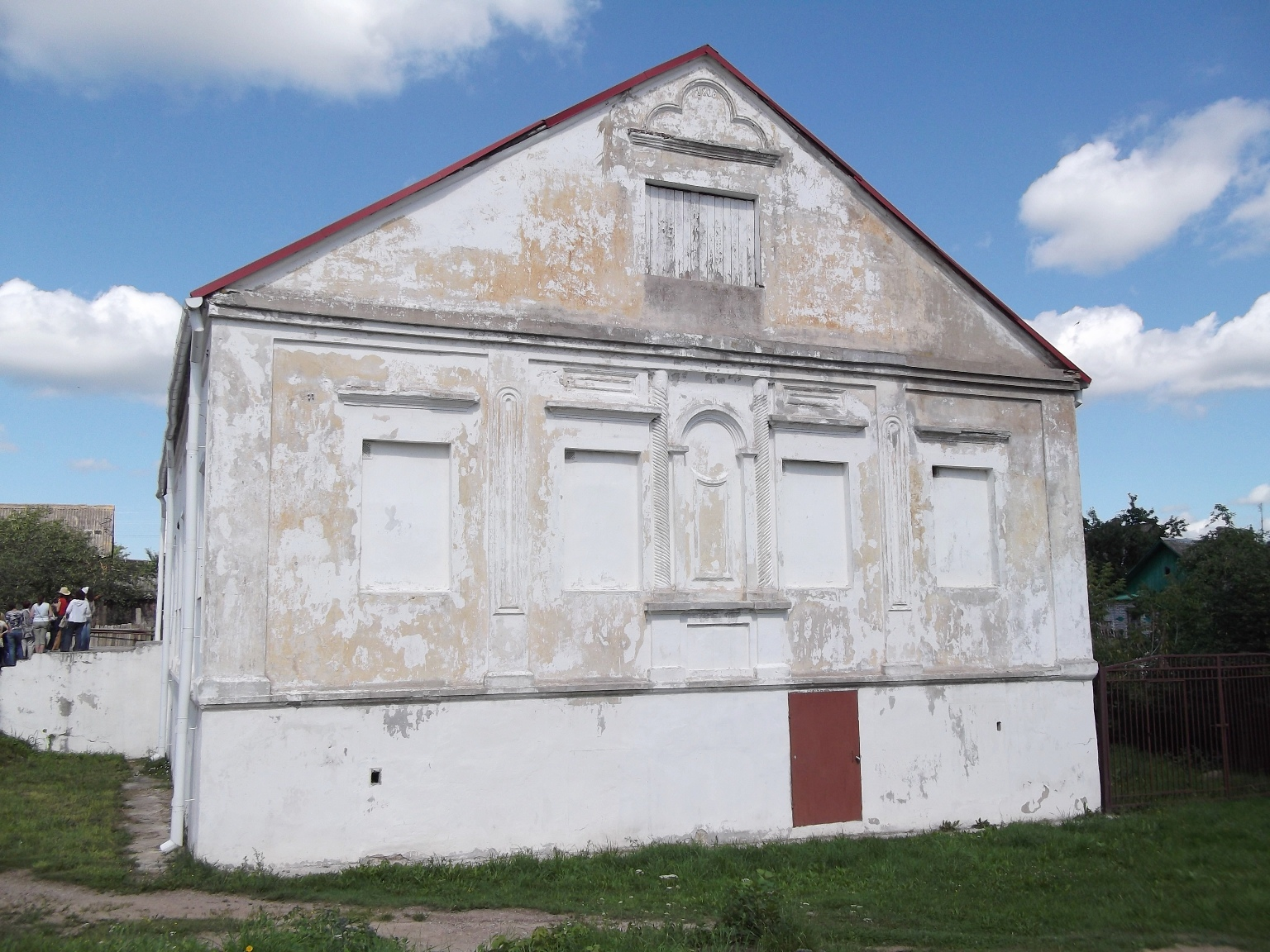
2012

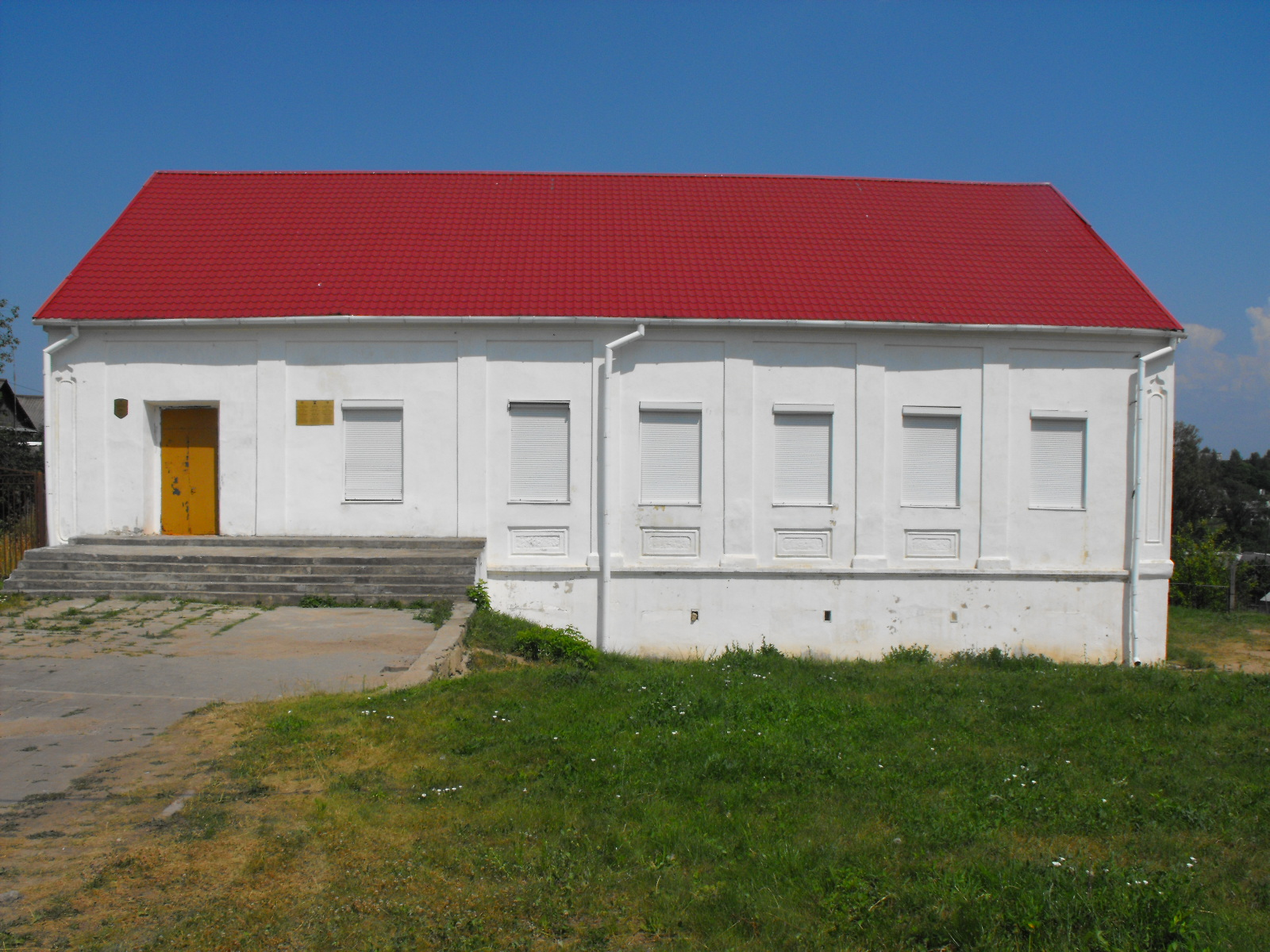
2012

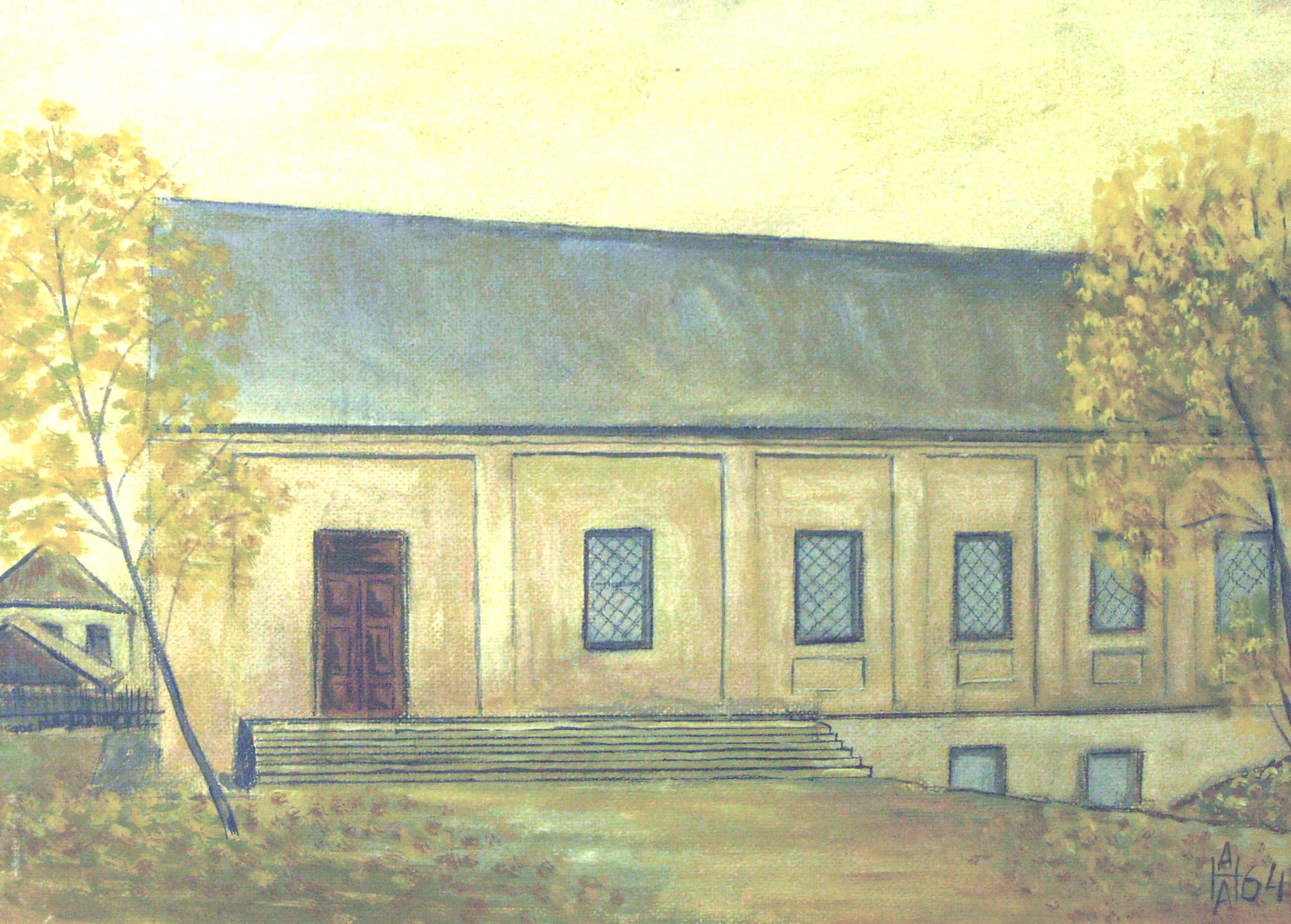
Tempera, Anatoly Nalivaev, 1964

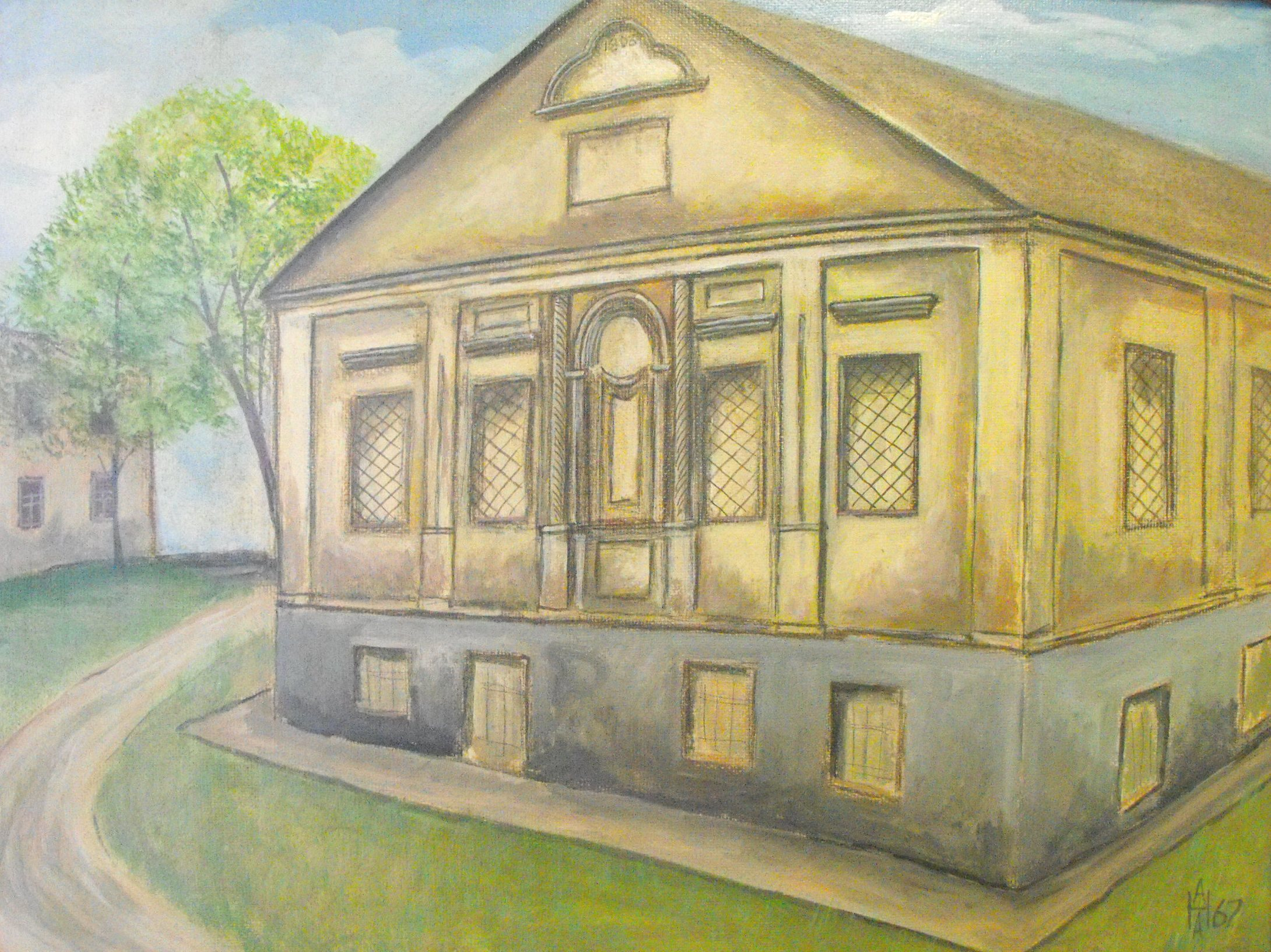
Tempera, Anatoly Nalivaev, 1967

== See also ==
- Vilna Rabbinical School and Teachers' Seminary

== Bibliography ==
- Stampfer, Shaul. Lithuanian Yeshivas of the Nineteenth Century.
- Leoni, E. (1970). Wolozyn; sefer shel ha-ir-shel yeshivat "Ets Hayim" (in Hebrew). Tel-Aviv.
