= Valozhyn =

Town in Minsk Region, Belarus

Valozhyn Валожын (Belarusian) Воложин (Russian)
- Town
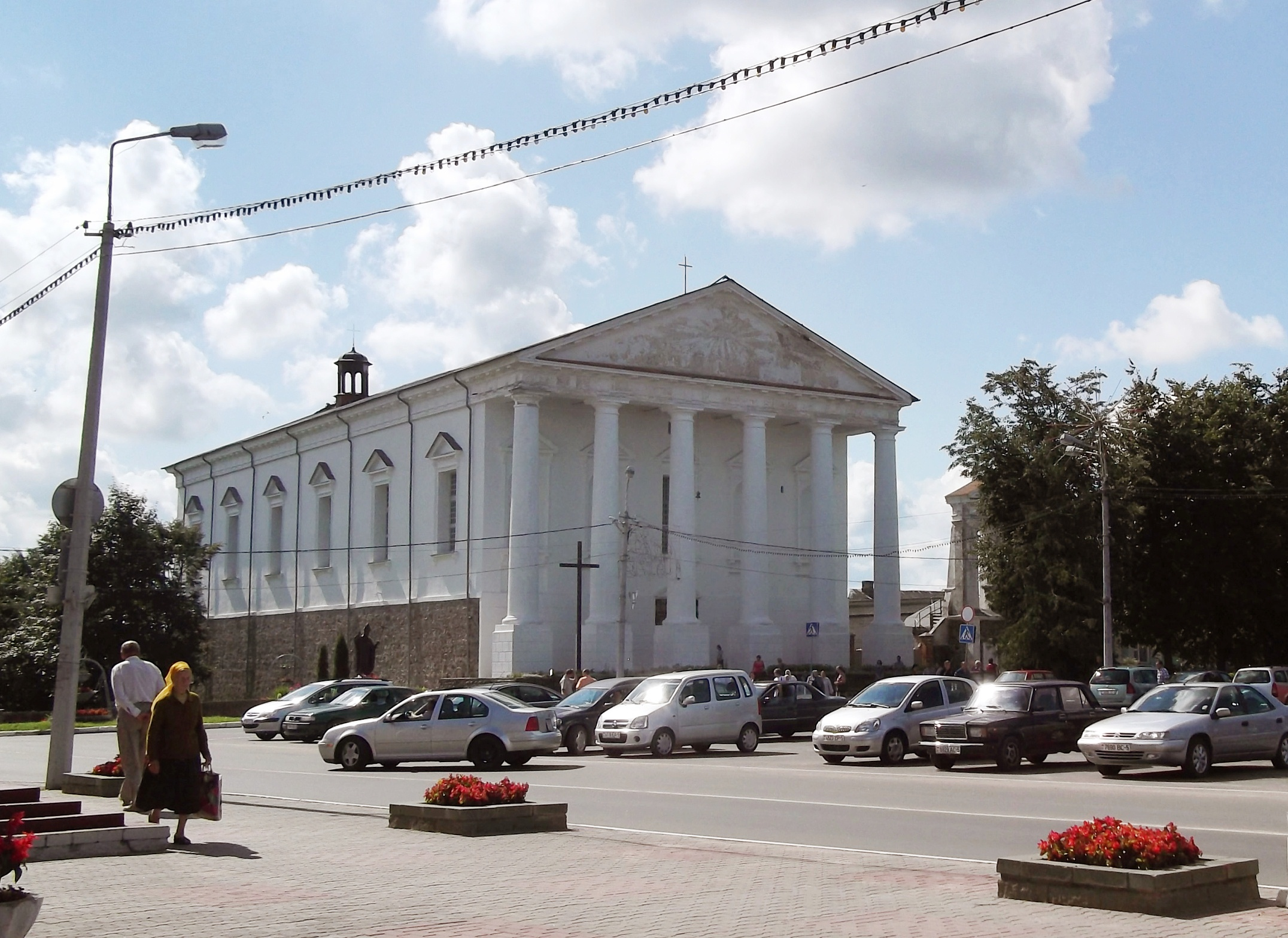

- Flag Coat of arms

- Location within Belarus
- Coordinates: 54°05′N 26°31′E
- Country: Belarus
- Region: Minsk Region
- District: Valozhyn District
- First mentioned: 14th century

Area
  - Total: 7.683 km^{2} (2.966 sq mi)
- Elevation: 203 m (666 ft)

Population (2026)
  - Total: 9,840
- Time zone: UTC+3 (MSK)
- Postal code: 222357
- Area code: +375 1772

Valozhyn or Volozhin (Note: Belarusian: Валожын, romanized: Valožyn, IPA: [vaˈɫoʐɨn]; Russian: Воложин; Lithuanian: Valažinas; Polish: Wołożyn; Yiddish: וואָלאָזשין.) is a town in Minsk Region, Belarus. It serves as the administrative center of Valozhyn District. It is located 75 km (47 mi) northwest of the capital Minsk, on the Valozhynka River in the Neman River basin, and the beginning of the Naliboki forest. In 1995, its population was approximately 11,500. As of 2026, it has a population of 9,840.

Before World War II, about half the town's population were Jewish but they were murdered during the Holocaust.

== History ==
=== Overview ===
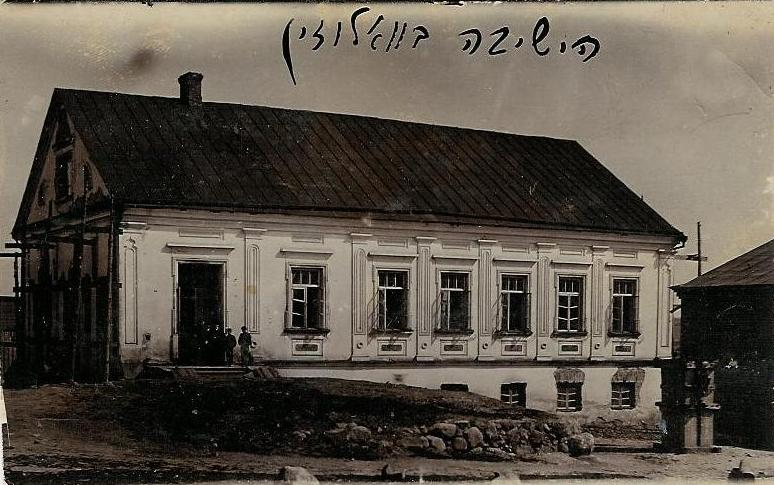
The Volozhin yeshiva

The town was built on the main road leading from Vilnius to Minsk. It is divided into two sections: the "lower neighborhood" along the river and the "upper neighborhood" toward the hills. Half of the town square is framed by the remains of 12th century buildings, including a bell tower, a palace, and a monastery. Most of the other remaining impressive buildings in the town are from the 19th century.

Valozhyn was established as a "privately owned city" by Count Tyszkiewicz in the 14th century, and remained so until the 20th century. The town was known for its fertile land, mainly supporting flax growing, as well as livestock farming of horses and cattle.

In 1681, the Bernardine Monastery was established, which included a Christian college.

Within the Grand Duchy of Lithuania, Valozhyn was part of Vilnius Voivodeship. In 1793, Valozhyn was acquired by the Russian Empire as a result of the Second Partition of Poland.

In 1839, Jozef Tyszkiewicz planted a large park and established a public zoo along the Valozhynka river. Three major fires, in 1815, 1880 and 1886, burned the city down, and it was rebuilt.

During World War I, Valozhyn became a strategic location, and was occupied by the Russian army. Most of the residents were allowed to stay in parts of their occupied homes. The town was attacked and bombed and most of the residents left it. In 1919 the Polish National Army took the town. After attacks on Jewish residents, a self-defense organization was established.

In the 2010s, the population declined, along with many other towns in Belarus. It was a county (powiat) centre in Nowogródek Voivodeship during Second Polish Republic period.

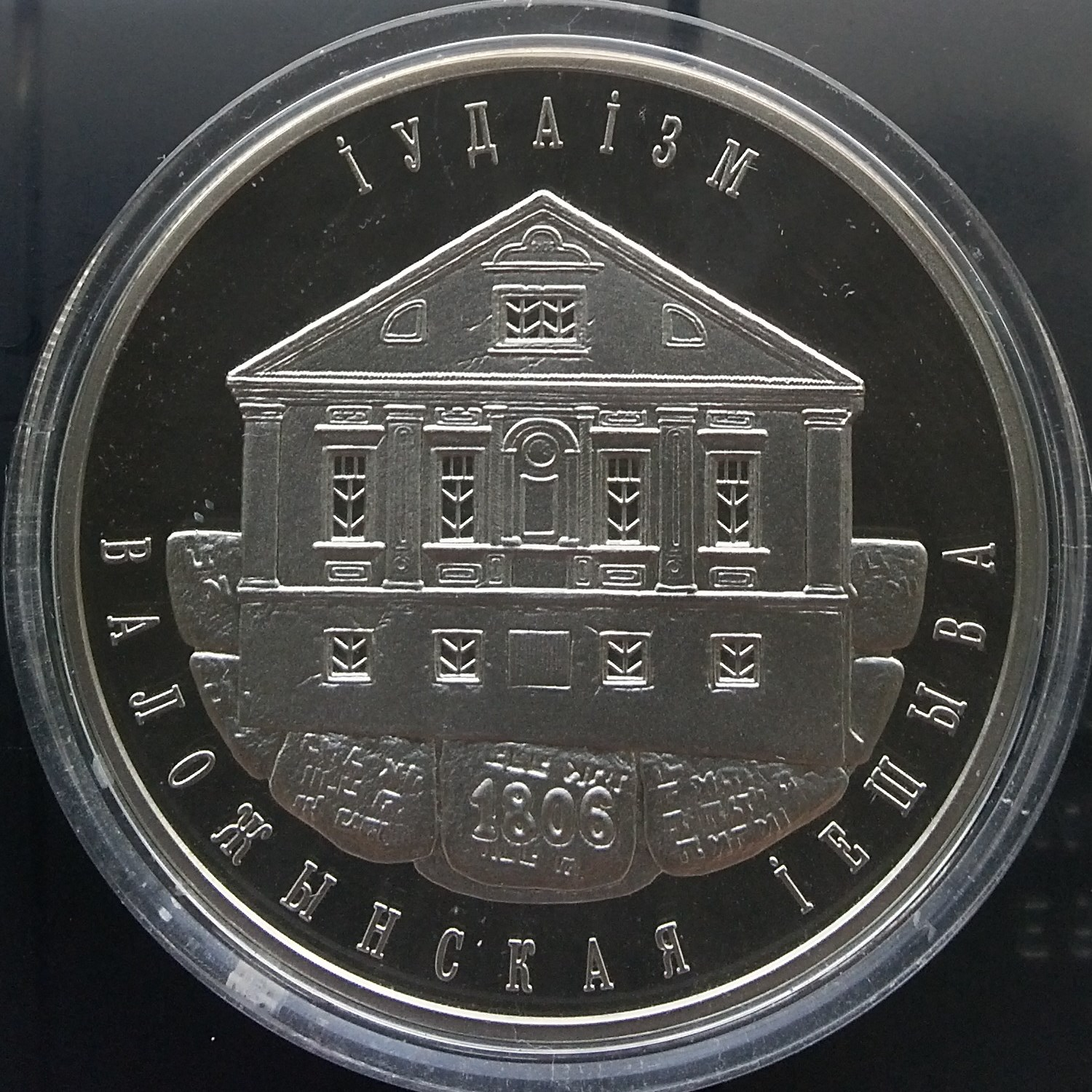
Silver coin of Belarus, 10 rubles, 2010, 925, diam. 33 mm (1 in), reverse, Volozhin yeshiva

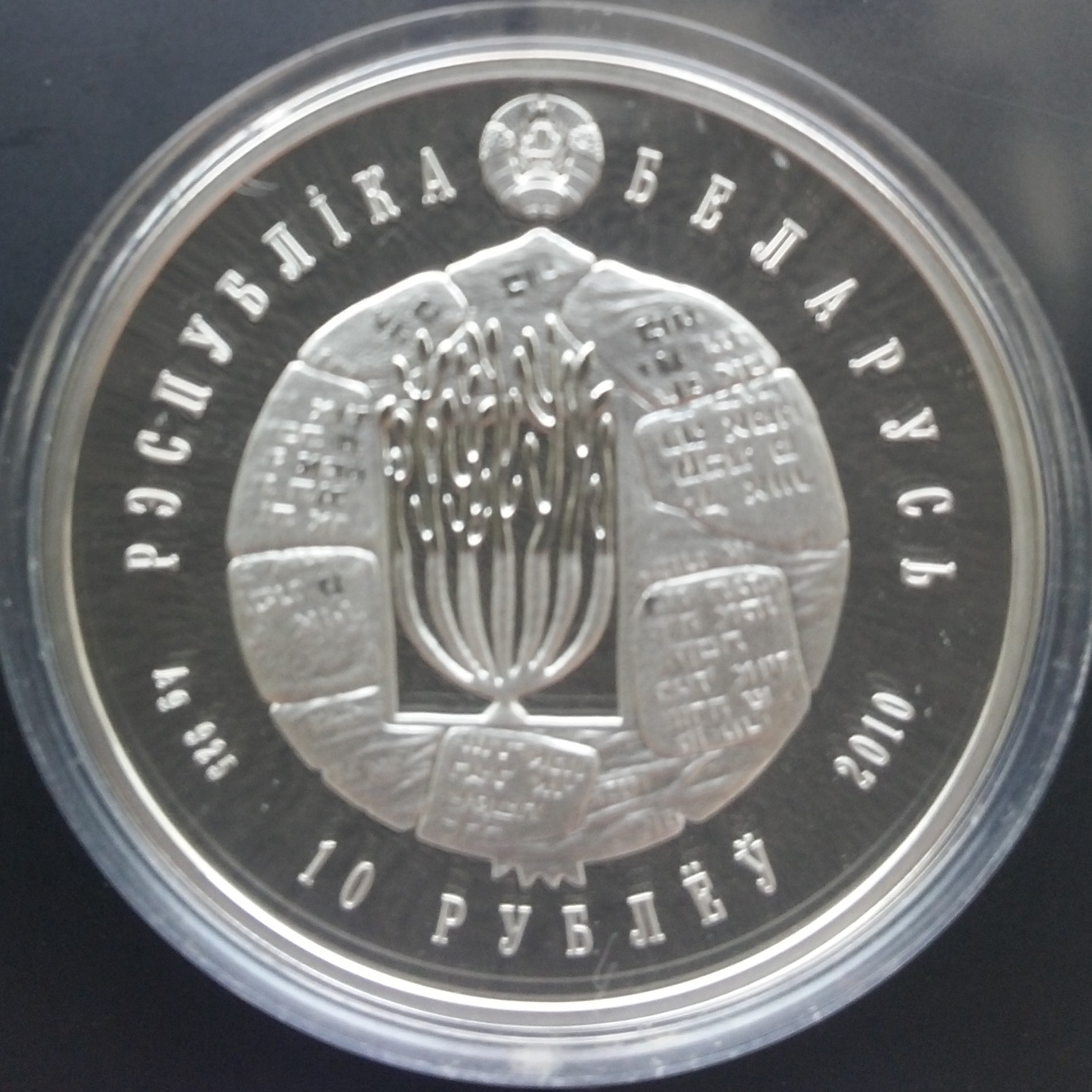
Silver coin of Belarus, 10 rubles, 2010, 925, diam. 33 mm (1 in), avers, Volozhin yeshiva

=== Jewish Yeshiva ===
The Yeshiva "Etz Haim", known as the "Volozhin Yeshiva", was established in 1807, by Rabbi Chaim Volozyn, the owner of a large textile factory, and with the assistance of the leading Graf Tyszkiewicz. This led to an increase in the Jewish population, which by the end of the nineteenth century was roughly equal to the Christian population in the town. The Jewish religious seminary was the first of its kind, and served as a model for later similar establishments. It was closed by the authorities in 1892, but, by that time, had spawned a large number of similar institutions in Belarus, Russia and Lithuania.

=== The Holocaust ===
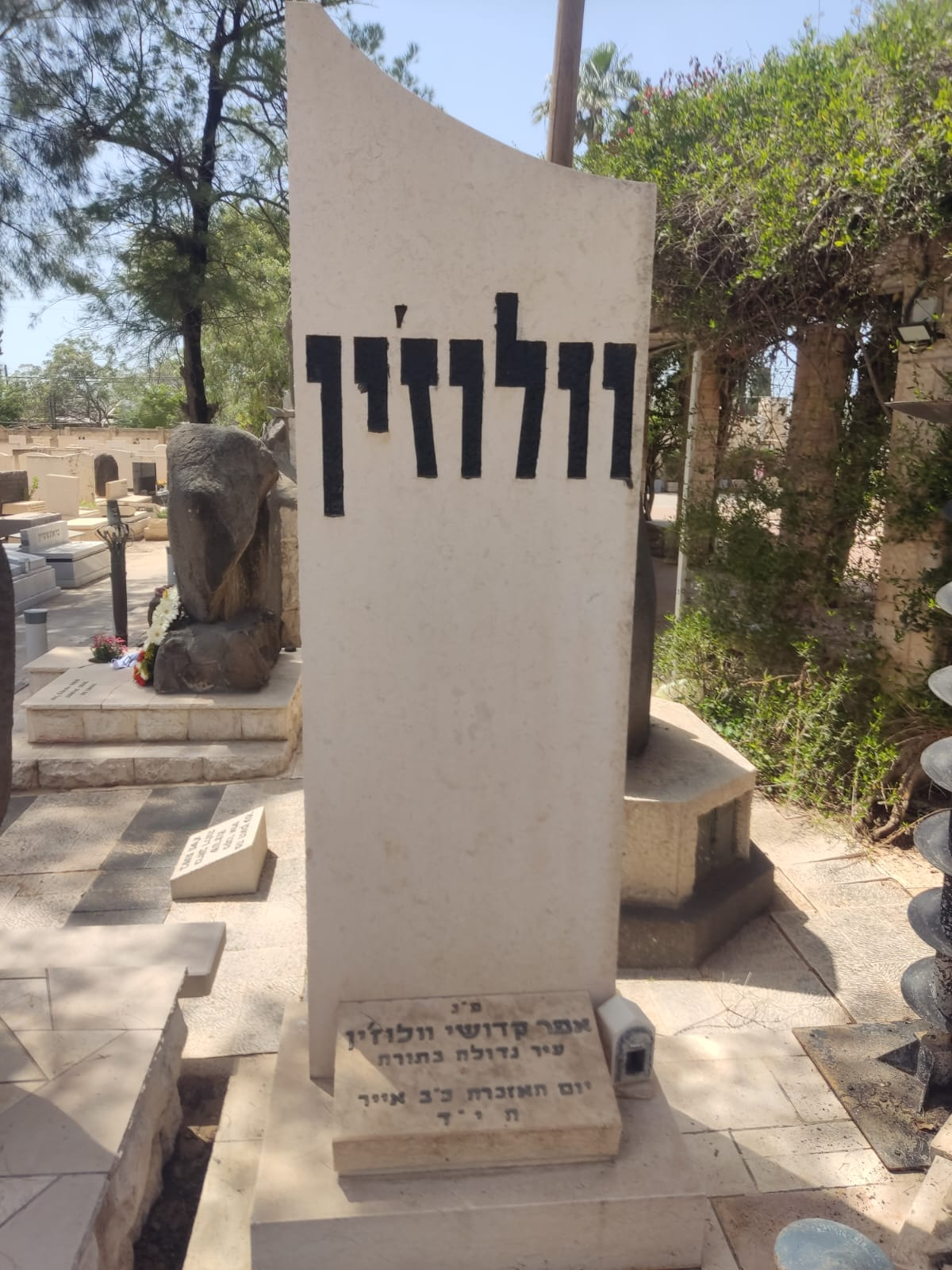
A monument in memory of the Jews of Valozhyn who were murdered in the Holocaust. In Kiryat Shaul cemetery in Tel Aviv

On 17 September 1939, the first day of the Soviet invasion of Poland, Valozhyn was occupied by the Red Army. On 14 November 1939, Valozhyn was incorporated into the Byelorussian SSR. All previously allowed religious studies were forbidden.

On the night of June 24–25, 1941, following the German invasion of the USSR, the NKVD started the evacuation of inmates from the local prison. After marching on foot for two days, approximately 100 prisoners were executed by the Soviets near the village of Tarasovo.

On the fourth day of Operation Barbarossa, on 25 June 1941 Valozhyn was bombed, captured by troops of the German Army Group Centre and mostly burned. Several Jews were murdered by German soldiers who entered the town. On the next day, a 12-member Judenrat was appointed by the Gestapo and shortly after Stanislaw Torsky, a member of the Polish National Democrats "Endek" party with strongly antisemitic views, was appointed mayor. On his second day as mayor, he ordered the arrest of the town doctor along with his daughter, and 10 other Jewish people, who were savagely beaten and shot. On 25 July 1941, Valozhyn was placed under the administration of the newly formed Generalbezirk Weißruthenien of Reichskommissariat Ostland. In August 1941, the Jewish residents of the town, approximately 3500 people, were moved to a ghetto in the "Aropzu" neighbourhood, along with Jewish residents from the neighboring towns Vishnyeva, Halshany and Ashmyany.

The Jews, as well as Russian prisoners in the area, were subjected to forced labour, tortured, underfed, and many of them publicly murdered. Local Christians who were caught having mercy or assisting the Jews in giving food received a similar fate.

On October 28, 1941, The head of the Gestapo, named Moka, ordered all the Jews in the ghetto to stand at a lecture of his, on work ethics. He freed most of them and kept around 200 people in the town's cinema. From there he took groups of 10 to a pit in the nearby forest and had them shot. Among the murdered was Jakob (Jani) Garber, the head of the Judenrat. Belarus police then stripped the dead of their belongings and covered the pit. Three people escaped and told the townspeople what had occurred.

Public killings continued, including an incident where several Jews were forced to lie down on a spread Torah Scroll and were subsequently shot.

On May 10, 1942, the Jews of Valozhyn were blamed for the killing of three Germans by Belarusian partisans several days earlier. At 5 a.m., the ghetto was cordoned by Belarus and Polish police along with the SS. They entered the ghetto, killed the two Jewish policemen at the gate, and then began shooting and gathering the Jews into a large blacksmith shop, where they set a table with drinks surrounded by machine guns. While drinking and singing they shot into the building "to silence the crying". Inside the building, an argument ensued where some called to die while resisting, but the leading rabbi called on the people to keep up hopes till the last minute.

The head of the police then called over a member of the Judenrat to polish his boots. When the man bent down, the policeman shot him in the head. This caused the Jews in the building who were able to watch this, to escape while scrambling to the roof and jumping off. Most were shot, but about 12 people escaped. The rest were held in the building till 5 p.m., and were then marched off to the forest in groups of children, women, elderly men and the rest, many in their prayer shawls and phylacteries from the morning prayers. They were marched through the Christian quarter, where they were met by dancing young men and women, singing, playing music and mocking the marched.

The people were taken to a house ("the Bulowa house") near the cemetery, and shot. The house was then set on fire.

A short while afterward the remaining Jews of Valozhyn were taken to the graveyard, forced to dig a large pit and were then buried alive by tractors and tanks who drove over them.

On 5 July 1944, Valozhyn was recaptured by troops of the Soviet 3rd Belorussian Front during the Vilnius Offensive. Following its liberation, several Jews who returned openly to Valozhyn were murdered by local townspeople.

A raion is a type of administrative unit of several post-Soviet states, translated as "district" in English. It was initially raion centre in Navahrudak Voblast (1939), later in Baranavichy Voblast (1939–1944) and Molodechno Voblast (1944–1960) before passing to Minsk Region.

== Climate ==
Climate data for Valozhyn (1991–2020)
| Month | Jan | Feb | Mar | Apr | May | Jun | Jul | Aug | Sep | Oct | Nov | Dec | Year |
|---|---|---|---|---|---|---|---|---|---|---|---|---|---|
| Record high °C (°F) | 4.2 (39.6) | 5.5 (41.9) | 13.0 (55.4) | 22.4 (72.3) | 26.9 (80.4) | 29.2 (84.6) | 30.4 (86.7) | 30.1 (86.2) | 25.4 (77.7) | 18.3 (64.9) | 10.9 (51.6) | 5.8 (42.4) | 30.4 (86.7) |
| Mean daily maximum °C (°F) | −1.9 (28.6) | −0.8 (30.6) | 4.4 (39.9) | 12.6 (54.7) | 18.5 (65.3) | 21.9 (71.4) | 23.9 (75.0) | 23.1 (73.6) | 17.3 (63.1) | 10.1 (50.2) | 3.7 (38.7) | −0.4 (31.3) | 11.0 (51.8) |
| Daily mean °C (°F) | −4.3 (24.3) | −3.6 (25.5) | 0.5 (32.9) | 7.6 (45.7) | 13.2 (55.8) | 16.7 (62.1) | 18.7 (65.7) | 17.9 (64.2) | 12.6 (54.7) | 6.6 (43.9) | 1.4 (34.5) | −2.6 (27.3) | 7.1 (44.8) |
| Mean daily minimum °C (°F) | −6.4 (20.5) | −5.9 (21.4) | −2.6 (27.3) | 3.5 (38.3) | 8.5 (47.3) | 12.1 (53.8) | 14.2 (57.6) | 13.4 (56.1) | 8.9 (48.0) | 3.9 (39.0) | −0.5 (31.1) | −4.6 (23.7) | 3.7 (38.7) |
| Record low °C (°F) | −18.6 (−1.5) | −16.2 (2.8) | −10.0 (14.0) | −3.4 (25.9) | 1.1 (34.0) | 6.1 (43.0) | 9.1 (48.4) | 7.7 (45.9) | 1.9 (35.4) | −3.4 (25.9) | −8.9 (16.0) | −13.8 (7.2) | −18.6 (−1.5) |
| Average precipitation mm (inches) | 45.4 (1.79) | 38.5 (1.52) | 37.7 (1.48) | 38.4 (1.51) | 66.7 (2.63) | 75.9 (2.99) | 81.4 (3.20) | 74.2 (2.92) | 58.1 (2.29) | 58.2 (2.29) | 46.7 (1.84) | 45.2 (1.78) | 666.4 (26.24) |
| Average precipitation days (≥ 1.0 mm) | 10.9 | 9.4 | 9.5 | 7.5 | 9.4 | 10.1 | 10.2 | 8.8 | 8.2 | 9.7 | 10.5 | 10.8 | 115.0 |
Source: NOAA

== Demographics ==
Historical population

| Year | Pop. | ±% |
|---|---|---|
| 1897 | 4,500 | — |
| 1931 | 6,361 | +41.4% |
| 1939 | 6,800 | +6.9% |
| 1959 | 4,800 | −29.4% |
| 1970 | 5,800 | +20.8% |
| 1979 | 7,906 | +36.3% |
| 1989 | 10,643 | +34.6% |
| 2006 | 10,901 | +2.4% |

| Year | Pop. | ±% |
|---|---|---|
| 2015 | 10,488 | −3.8% |
| 2018 | 10,308 | −1.7% |
| 2022 | 9,993 | −3.1% |
| 2023 | 10,064 | +0.7% |
| 2024 | 10,015 | −0.5% |
| 2025 | 9,923 | −0.9% |
| 2026 | 9,840 | −0.8% |

== Notable people ==
- Rabbi Chaim of Volozhin, founder and head of the Volozhin Yeshiva
- Rabbi Naftali Zvi Yehuda Berlin, head of the Volozhin Yeshiva
- Rabbi Chaim Soloveitchik, born in Volozhin and head of the Volozhin Yeshiva before moving to Brest-Litovsk
- Rabbi Refael Shapiro head of the Volozhin Yeshiva
- Rabbi Meir Bar-Ilan, leader of Mizrachi party in Israel
- Haim Nachman Bialik, Hebrew poet, studied at the Volozhin Yeshiva
- Lauren Bacall (born Betty Joan Perske), American actress whose paternal grandparents were born in Valyozhyn
