= Chaim of Volozhin =

Belarusian Orthodox rabbi, Talmudist and ethicist

Rabbi Chaim of Volozhin

Personal life
- Born: 21 January 1749 Valozhyn, Polish–Lithuanian Commonwealth
- Died: 14 June 1821 (aged 72) Valozhyn, Russian Empire

Religious life
- Religion: Judaism
- Denomination: Orthodox Judaism

Jewish leader
- Position: Founder, Rosh yeshiva
- Yeshiva: Volozhin Yeshiva
- Yahrtzeit: 14 Sivan 5581

Chaim of Volozhin (also known as Chaim ben Yitzchok of Volozhin or Chaim Ickovits; 21 January 1749 – 14 June 1821) was a rabbi, Talmudist, and ethicist. Popularly known as "Reb Chaim Volozhiner" or simply as "Reb Chaim", he was born in Volozhin (now Valozhyn, Belarus) when it was a part of the Polish–Lithuanian Commonwealth. He died there while it was under the control of the Russian Empire.

The title of his major work is Nefesh Ha-Chaim.

== Student of the Vilna Gaon ==
Both Chaim and his elder brother Simcha (d. 1812) studied under Rabbi Aryeh Leib ben Asher Gunzberg, the author of the Shaagas Aryeh, who was then rabbi of Volozhin, and afterward under Rabbi Raphael ha-Kohen, (the author of the Toras Yekusiel), later of Hamburg.

He studied Torah for its sake with all his strength, with the greatest holiness, and the most amazing purity. He did not ignore ‘any small or large matter’ in Talmud Bavli, Yerushalmi, Mechilta, Sifra, Sifri, Tosefta, all the Midrashim, the holy Zohar and the Tikkunim, the acts of Creation and Merkava, the Sefer Yetzirah, all the holy words of the first Kabbalists, and the writings of the Arizal. He toiled tremendously over all of them in an immeasurable way to reconcile their words, to delve into their awesome depths, to correct the light from the darkness of the errors until he demonstrated pathways in their holy words, all of them clear and elucidated, ‘a true Torah in his mouth,’ according to the truth of Torah. All his studies were systematically ordered, laid out, and preserved investing all of his strength to work on it and preserve it literally giving his life over every issue and detail of the Torah and never, in all of his life, looking beyond his four cubits. The degree of his abstinence from worldly matters was wondrous to the extent that he never inquired of his children’s welfare, never writing them ‘unnecessary letters’ and he never read their letters. He was a living person by grasping the Tree of Life virtually never tasting the taste of sleep from the day his holy intellect matured until the Torah was given to him as a gift. His two kidneys became as two fountains, a flowing source of wisdom, growing stronger from day to day and from hour to hour. In addition to this was his awesome humility and lowliness of spirit reflecting his greatness in Torah and one who did not see the holiness of his Torah, service of God and the refined purity of his abstinence from this world, piety, and humility, has never seen ‘light in his days.’

— Chaim of Volozhin - his speaking about his teacher, the Gaon of Vilna (“Nefesh Chaim”)

Aged 25, Chaim became a disciple of Vilna Gaon. Using his new teacher's method, he began his studies anew, returning to Torah, Mishnah, Talmud, and Hebrew grammar. His admiration for the Gaon was boundless, and after his death Chaim virtually acknowledged no superior.

== Establishing the Volozhin Yeshiva ==
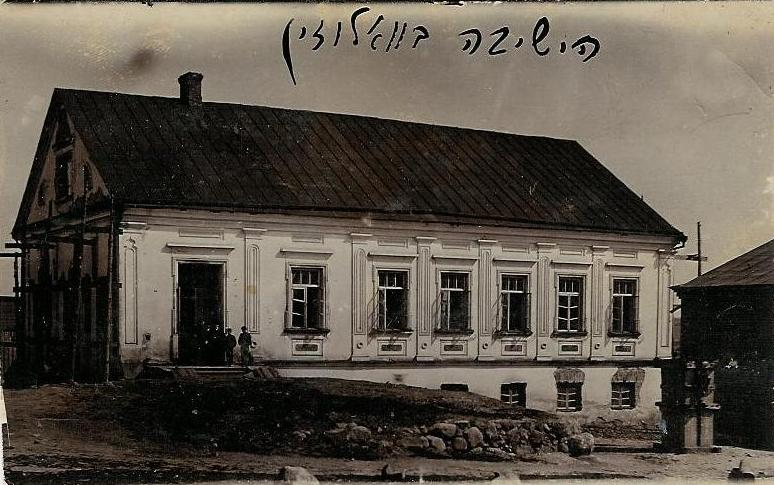
Volozhin Yeshiva

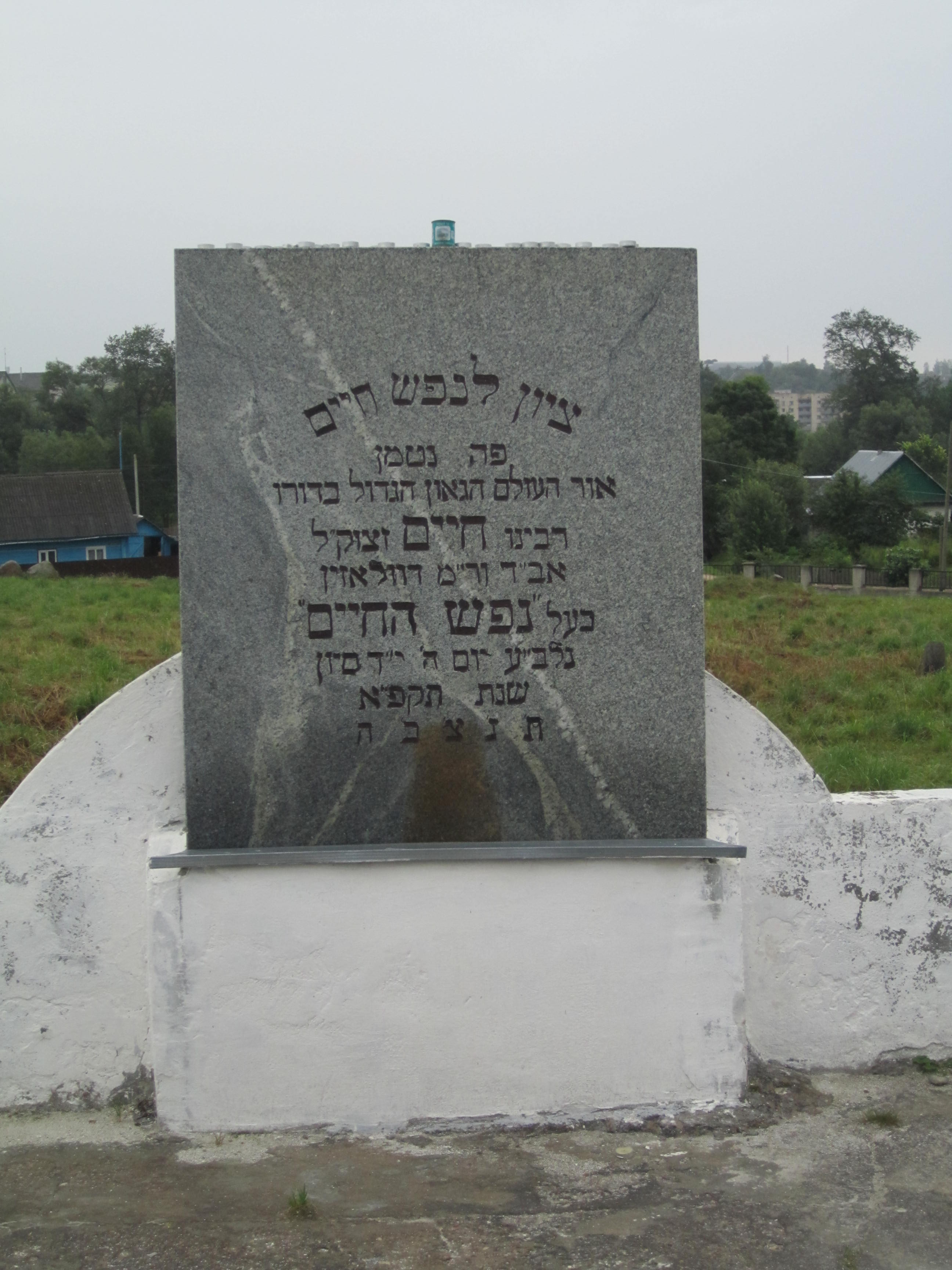
Tombstone of Chaim of Volozhin

It was with the view of applying the methods of the Vilna Gaon that Chaim founded the Volozhin yeshiva, then called Yeshivat Etz Chaim, in 1803 a yeshiva that remained in operation for almost 90 years until it was closed in 1892. The yeshiva became the "mother of all Lithuanian-style yeshivas". He began with ten pupils, young residents of Volozhin, whom Chaim maintained at his own expense. It is related that his wife sold her jewelry to contribute to their maintenance.

The fame of the institution spread, and the number of its students increased, necessitating an appeal to which the Jews of Russia generously responded. Rabbi Chaim lived to see his yeshiva housed in its own building, and to preside over a hundred disciples. He saw one of his students establish his own yeshiva, in Mir.

Chaim continued to teach the Vilna Gaon's study method of penetrating analysis of the Talmudic text, seeking to elicit the intent and meaning of the writing of the Rishonim. This approach was followed by all the great Lithuanian yeshivas, such as Slobodka yeshiva, Mir Yeshiva, Ponevezh yeshiva, Kelm yeshiva, Kletsk yeshiva, and Telz yeshiva.

== Works ==
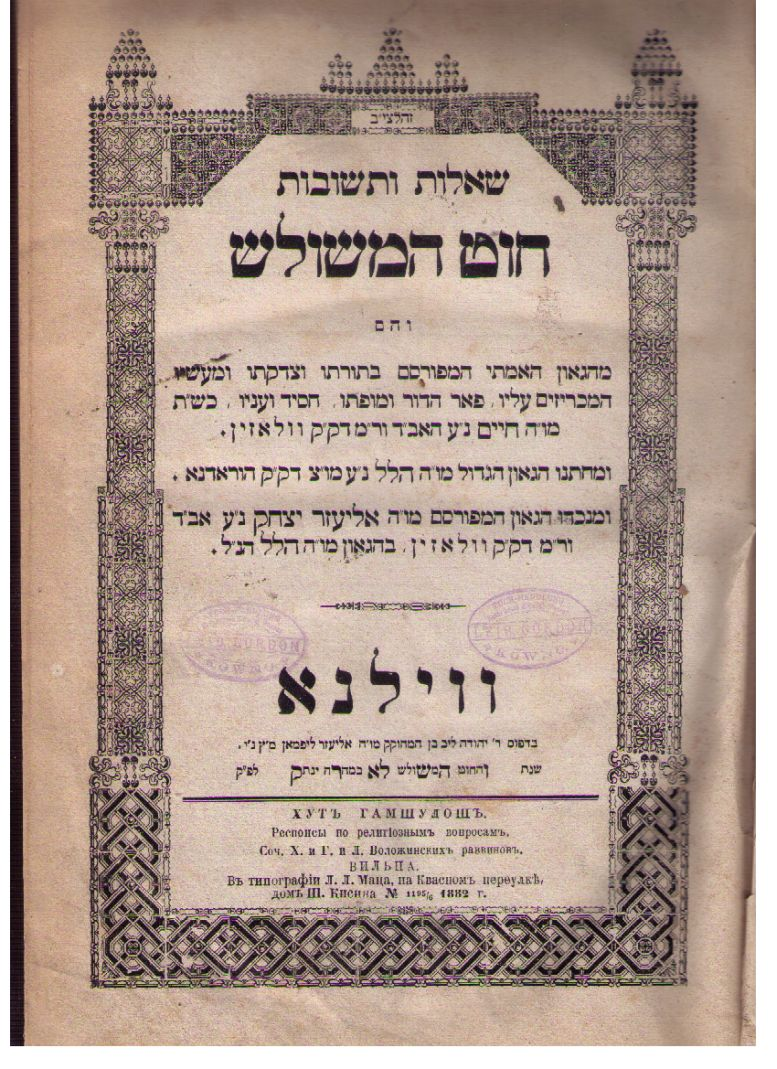
Cover page of book of Chaim of Volozhin's Responsa, Chut HaMeshulash, published in 1882

Rav Chaim's major work is the Nefesh Ha-Chaim ("Living Soul"). It deals with complex understandings of the nature of God, but also with secrets of prayer and the importance of Torah, and the purpose being "to implant the fear of God, Torah, and pure worship into the hearts of the upright who are seeking the ways of God". It presents a clear and orderly kabbalistic Weltanschauung that addresses many of the same issues as the Hasidic texts of the day. The work is generally viewed as the Lithuanian response to Hasidism, albeit in a much less harsh manner than the criticisms of Hasidim voiced by Rav Chaim's predecessors such as the Vilna Gaon and Rav Yechezkel Landau. Norman Lamm described its structure:

The Nefesh ha-Hayyim consists of five parts, four of which are numbered and are called 'gates.' The fifth part, which appears between the third and fourth gates, is unnumbered. The first three gates, which are primarily metaphysical-mystical, number, respectively, twenty-two, eighteen, and fourteen chapters. The fourth gate, or final part, which is more popular and exoteric and extols the study of Torah, contains thirty-four chapters. The unnumbered part, containing eight chapters, is in the nature of a preface to gate 4 (and henceforth will be termed 'pre-4') and deals primarily with ethical material, such as the suppression of pride and other undesirable character traits, especially as it relates to the study of Torah and the performance of the commandments. ... The fact that it is unnumbered indicates that it was written after the rest of the book had been composed and was already in completed manuscript form. Evidence for this may also be found from the glosses and cross-references that are found throughout the book.

In addition, Chaim wrote Ruach Chaim, published posthumously. It is a commentary on Pirkei Avoth. Both titles also play on his name, "Chaim". Thus, for example, "The Spirit of Life" can also be translated as "Chaim's Spirit" or "Chaim's Soul".

Many of Chaim's responsa on halakhic subjects were lost by fire in 1815.

== Family ==
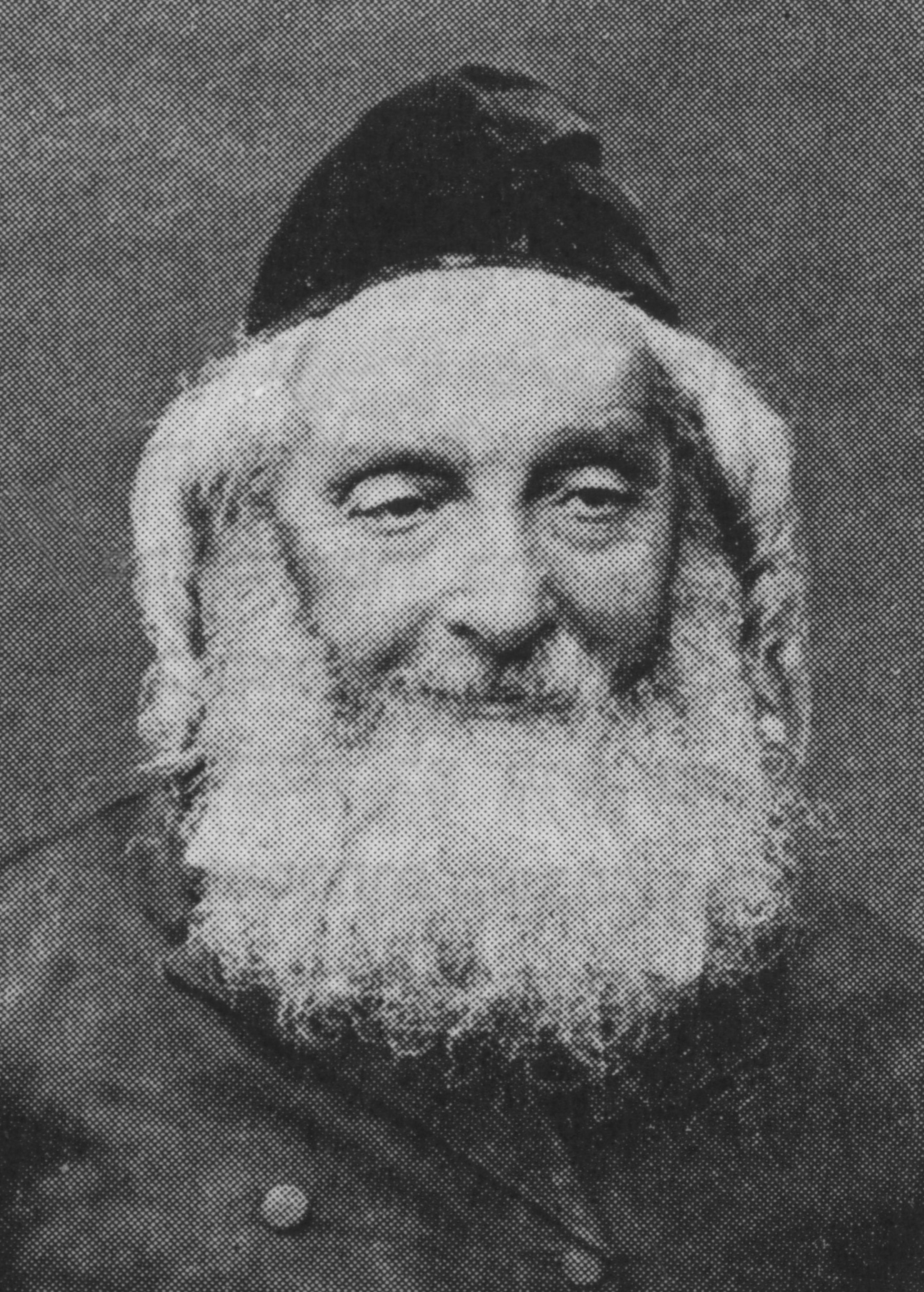
The "Netziv"

Chaim's brother, known as Zalman of Volozhin, is considered to have been among the greatest students of the Vilna Gaon. Zalman of Volozhin's biography, the hagiographical Toldos Adam, includes many anecdotes related to the author by Rabbi Chaim. Rabbi Chaim's son, Yitzchak, took over the leadership of the yeshiva upon his father's death in 1821. Yitzchak's daughter, Rivka, was married to Rabbi Eliezer Yitzchak Fried, her first cousin. (Eliezer Yitzchak's mother, Esther, was Yitzchak's sister.) Another of Yitzchak's daughters married Naftali Zvi Yehuda Berlin aka the "Netziv". Among Rabbi Chaim's descendants are the Soloveitchik family, such as his great-grandson Yosef Dov Soloveitchik.
