= Sifrei Kodesh =

Collective term for all Jewish religious literature

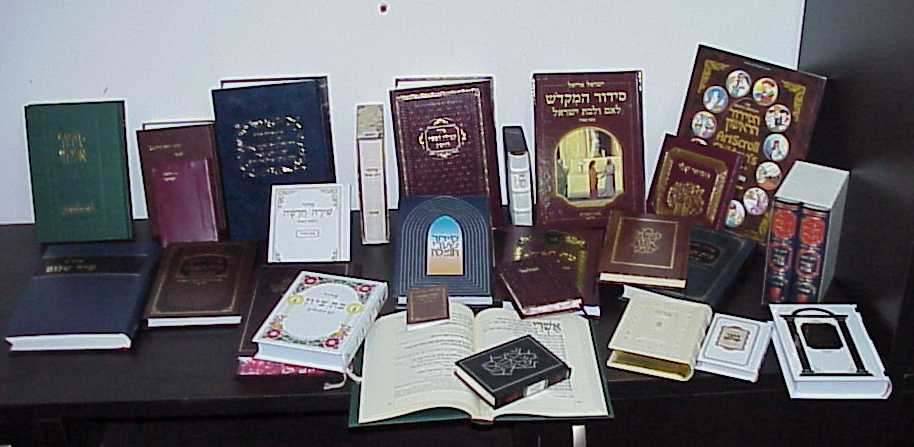
Jewish prayerbooks

Sifrei Kodesh (Hebrew: ספרי קודש, lit. 'Holy books'), commonly referred to as sefarim (Hebrew: ספרים, lit. 'books'), or in its singular form, sefer, are books of Jewish religious literature and are viewed by religious Jews as sacred. These are generally works of Torah literature, i.e. Tanakh and all works that expound on it, including the Mishnah, Midrash (Halakha, Aggadah), Talmud, and all works of Musar, Hasidism, Kabbalah, or machshavah ("Jewish Thought"). Historically, sifrei kodesh were generally written in Hebrew with some in Judeo-Aramaic or Arabic, although in recent years, thousands of titles in other languages, most notably English, were published. An alternative spelling for 'sefarim' is seforim.

== Terms ==
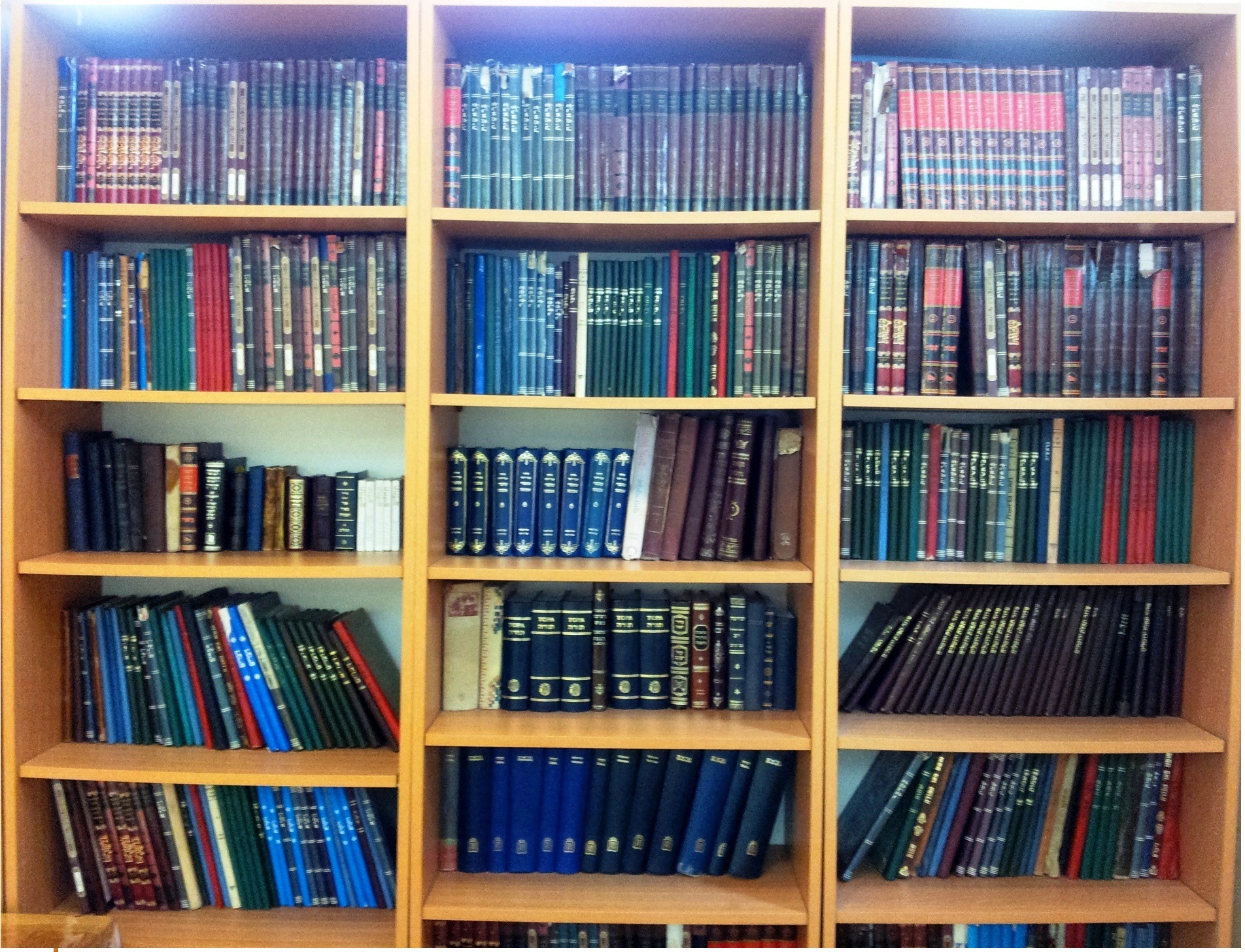
A bookshelf of sifrei kodesh

The term Sifrei Kodesh is Hebrew for "Holy Books", and includes all books that are considered holy in Rabbinic Judaism. This includes all Torah literature as well as Jewish prayer books.

Among Orthodox Jews the word ספר sefer (plural ספרים s'farim) is used for books of the Tanakh, the Oral Torah (Mishnah and Talmud) or any work of rabbinic literature. Works unrelated to Torah study are rarely called sefer by English-speaking Orthodox Jews. Among Hebrew-speaking Ashkenazi Jews, the differentiation between books related to Torah study and other books is made by referring to the former with traditional Ashkenazi pronunciation (SEY-fur) and to the latter with Modern Hebrew pronunciation (SEF-fer).

The term "Torah" has two meanings. It can refer solely to the Five Books of Moses. Traditionally, it is written on a parchment scroll, known as a Sefer Torah, although it is also printed in book form, known as a Chumash (and in some cases a tikkun). The term "Torah" can also include the Nevi'im and Ketuvim and rabbinic texts, and such books are therefore sometimes also referred to as "Torah literature" (Hebrew: ספרות תורנית, romanized: Sifrut Toranit).

The Hebrew Bible or Tanakh, also known as Torah Shebikhtav ("Written " as opposed to "Oral" Torah) is a collective term for the three sections of the Bible, those being the Torah, the Nevi'im, and the Ketuvim. Separately, the Nevi'im and Ketuvim are also called Nakh.

=== Commentaries ===
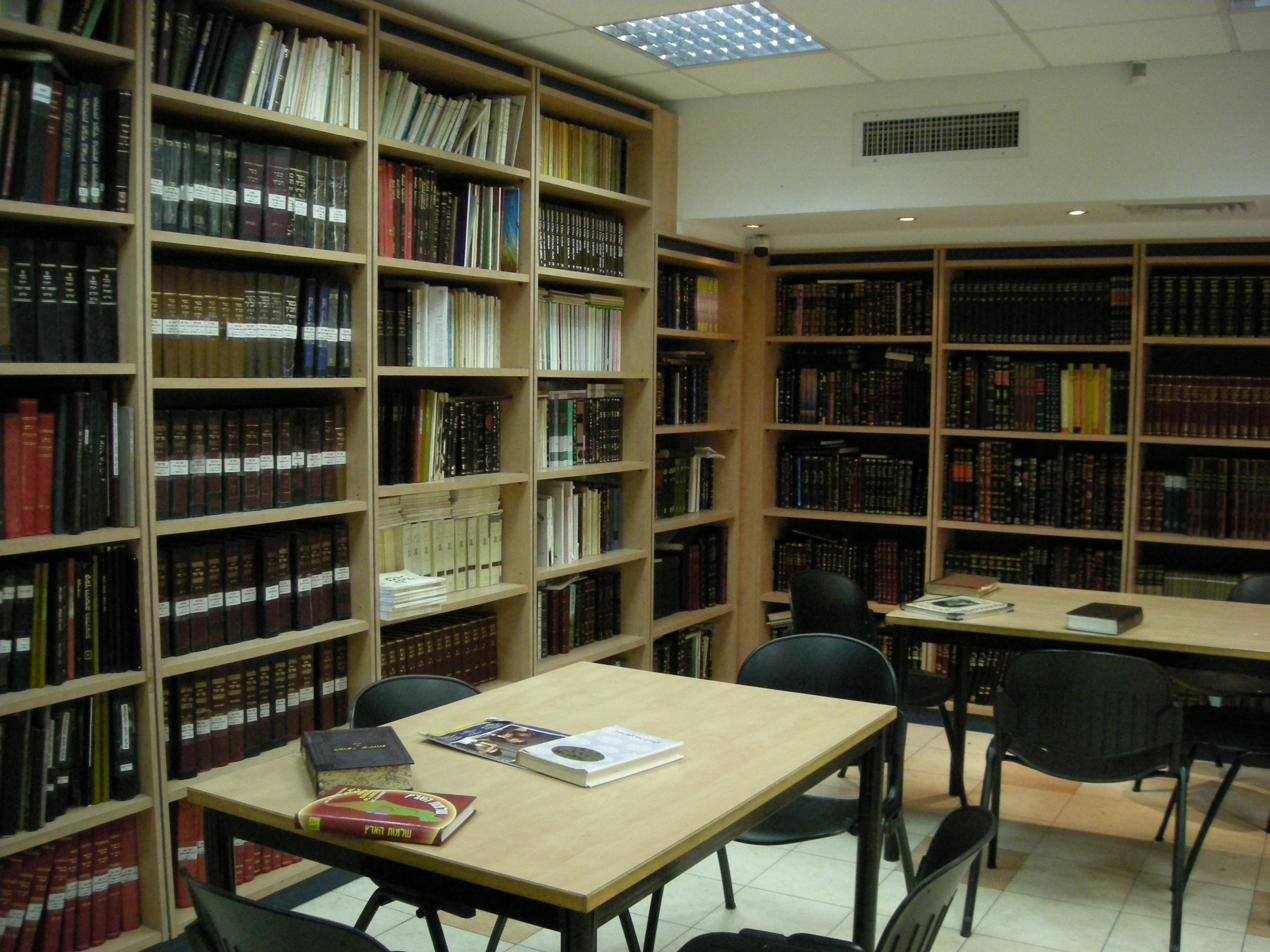
A library of sifrei kodesh

Numerous commentaries on the Tanakh have been written and published over the last thousand years. The most notable ones are Targum Onkelos, a translation of the Torah into Judeo-Aramaic, written by Onkelos; and Rashi, a commentary on the entire Tanakh written by Rashi. Both are traditionally printed in the Chumash alongside the biblical text. Other commentaries that are sometimes printed alongside the text in the Chumash are commentaries by Rabbi Jacob ben Asher (the Ba’al HaTurim) and Rabbi Shabbethai Bass (the Siftei Chachamim). Commentaries traditionally printed alongside the Nakh are Rashi as well as Metzudat David and Metzudat Zion by Rabbi David Altschuler.

In addition to the classic printings of Tanakh which don't include many more commentaries than Rashi and Targum Onkelos, there is the Mikraot Gedolot edition which was first published in the early sixteenth century. Commentaries in the Mikraot Gedolot on the Torah are generally those of Abraham ibn Ezra (Sefer ha-Yashar), Nachmanides, Rabbi Shlomo Ephraim Luntschitz (the Keli Yakar), Chaim ibn Attar, and the translation and commentary attributed to Rabbi Jonathan ben Uzziel, known as Targum Pseudo-Jonathan, all in addition to Rashi and Targum Onkelos; while commentaries on Nakh are those of Rashi, Rabbi David Altschuler, Rabbi David Kimhi, Rabbi Joseph Kara, and on some volumes, Rabbi Obadiah ben Jacob Sforno (the Sforno or Sepornu).

Among the numerous commentaries of Tanakh not published in the Mikraot Gedolot are the Meam Loez, Malbim, Ha'amek Davar, Torah Temimah, and The Hirsch Chumash.

=== Other texts in ancient times ===
Aside from the Bible, there were several writings of Jewish religious significance in ancient times, known today as "the outer books". There are some other writings however that most agree were written more recently that have been claimed to be older. These include the Sefer Yetzirah, which some say was written by Abraham; and the Book of Enoch, which some say was written by Enoch.

== Works of Chazal ==
Jewish belief is that the Pentateuch is of Mosaic authorship, meaning that it was dictated by God to Moses. Later writings, the Nevi'im and Ketuvim, were, according to tradition, written by Jewish prophets. For over a thousand years, these books, known as Tanakh, were more or less the sole writings of Judaism. However, there was much material that was not written down, and instead memorized. Known as the Oral Torah, it includes over five hundred laws learned out from Talmudical hermeneutics as well as the laws given to Moses at Sinai (Hebrew: הלכה למשה מסיני, romanized: Halakhah leMoshe miSinai). However, circa 200 C.E., much of the Oral Torah was written down, and is known as the Mishnah (the Zohar, a book chronicling the hidden parts of the Torah, was written down as well around this time by Rabbi Shimon bar Yochai). Three hundred years later the Talmud was written, expounding on the Mishnah.

=== Mishnah ===
For generations, the Oral Torah had been transmitted by word of mouth, largely with the help of the Sanhedrin, the leading Jewish authority. However, after the destruction of the Second Temple, the Sanhedrin had been uprooted and much of the Oral Torah was being forgotten. Therefore, c. 188 CE, Rabbi Judah ha-Nasi, head of the exiled Sanhedrin, compiled the Mishnah, i.e. the teachings of the Oral Torah. Since the Maccabean Revolt however, much had already been lost, which led to many disagreements among the scholars, the Tannaim. Therefore, the Mishnah includes their differing opinions. As Maimonides wrote in the introduction to his Mishneh Torah:

[Rabbi Judah ha-Nasi] gathered together all the traditions, enactments, interpretations, and expositions of every position of the Torah, that either came down to Moses, our teacher, or had been deduced by the courts in successive generations.

A similar project was carried out by Rabbi Hiyya bar Abba and his student Rabbi Hoshaiah, known as the Tosefta. A collection of statements not included in the Mishnah was compiled by Rabbi Oshiya and Bar Kappara, known as Baraitot.

=== Talmud ===
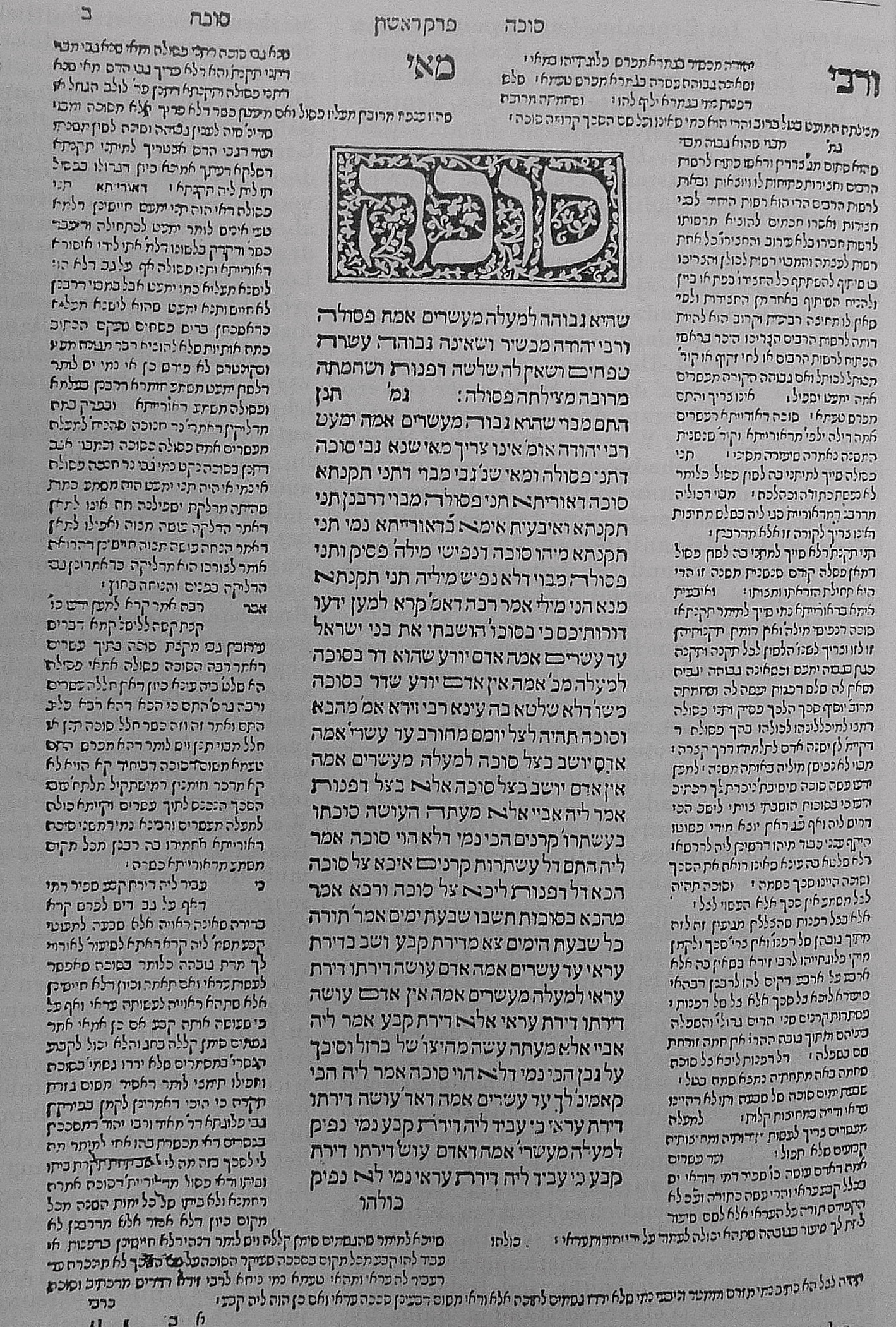
A page of the Bomberg Talmud

Circa 349, the Sanhedrin, exiled from Jerusalem and sitting in Tiberias, wrote the Jerusalem Talmud, a mammoth work compiling the teachings of the rabbis of the recent generations, known as Amoraim, as they expounded on the Mishnah. It is largely attributed to Rabbi Yochanan. However, the Jerusalem Talmud is generally overshadowed by the Babylonian Talmud, a similar yet much larger work, compiling the teachings of the Amoraim, and completed in Babylonia circa 500. The teachings were largely legalistic in nature, stating halakha. There were other teachings, known as aggadah, which incorporates narratives, parables, practical advice, remedies, and insights. The Babylonian Talmud, attributed to Rav Ashi and Ravina, was first printed in 1483 by Joshua Solomon Soncino. Soncino's layout of the Talmud, with the original Talmud text in the center of the page, with the commentary of Rashi on the outer margins and the commentary of Tosafot on the inner ones, was later imitated by Christian printer Daniel Bomberg, who printed the entire Talmud between the years 1519 and 1523, and by all subsequent major printings of the Talmud. Rabbi Moshe Shapiro, rabbi of Slavuta, Ukraine and owner of a printing press, published the Slavita Shas (Note: Note: Shas is a Hebrew acronym for Shisha Sidrei and is used to refer to the entirety of the Talmud.) in the early 1800s. In 1886, the Romm Publishing House in Vilnius published the Vilna Shas, which has since been reprinted and remains the classic print of the Talmud.

In the past years, there have been numerous commentaries written on the Talmud. While the most commonly referenced commentaries are those of Rashi and Tosafot, and as mentioned, are printed in the margins of the Talmud, other famous commentaries (which often are recognized as Halakhic works as well) include the Piskei HaRosh, Shitah Mekubetzet, Maharsha (the Piskei Halachot and Piskei Aggadot), the Pnei Yehoshua, the Mordechai, the Chiddushia HaRitva, the Meiri, the Maharshal's Chochmas Shlomo and Yam Shel Shlomo, the Meir Einei Chachmamim, the Kehillos Yaakov, the Shaarei Yosher, and the Birkat Shmuel, as well as many published shiurim (classes) given on the Talmud, including those of Rabbi Nochum Partzovitz (Chiddushei Reb Nochum and Shiurei Reb Nochum), Rabbi Shmuel Rozovsky (Shiurei Reb Shmuel and Chiddushei Reb Shmuel), Rabbi Reuven Grozovsky (Chiddushei Rev Reuven), Rabbi Elchonon Wasserman (Kovetz Shiurim and Kovetz He'aros), Rabbi Chaim Soloveitchik (Chiddushei HaGrach al HaShas), Rabbi Naftoli Trop (Chiddushei HaGranat), and Rabbi Aryeh Leib Malin (Chiddushei Reb Aryeh Leib).

== Kabbalah ==
The term Kabbalah refers to the "hidden parts of the Torah," often described as "Jewish metaphysics." Kabbalistic works show how every physical thing is a metaphor for a spiritual concept. The primary Kabbalistic work, the Zohar, was written by Rabbi Shimon bar Yochai, a Tanna who lived in the second century, although it was lost for many years. However, it was discovered in Spain in the thirteenth century and transcribed by hand numerous times, leading to changes between the texts. Between 1558 and 1560, it was printed in Mantua based on ten different manuscripts in order to glean the correct text. A separate printing took place in Cremona around the same time, using only six manuscripts, leading to differences in the two printings.

The Zohar was largely expounded on by Rabbi Yitzchak Luria (known as the Arizal) and his teachings were summarized in the book Etz Chaim by his chief student, Rabbi Chaim Vital.

== Halakha ==
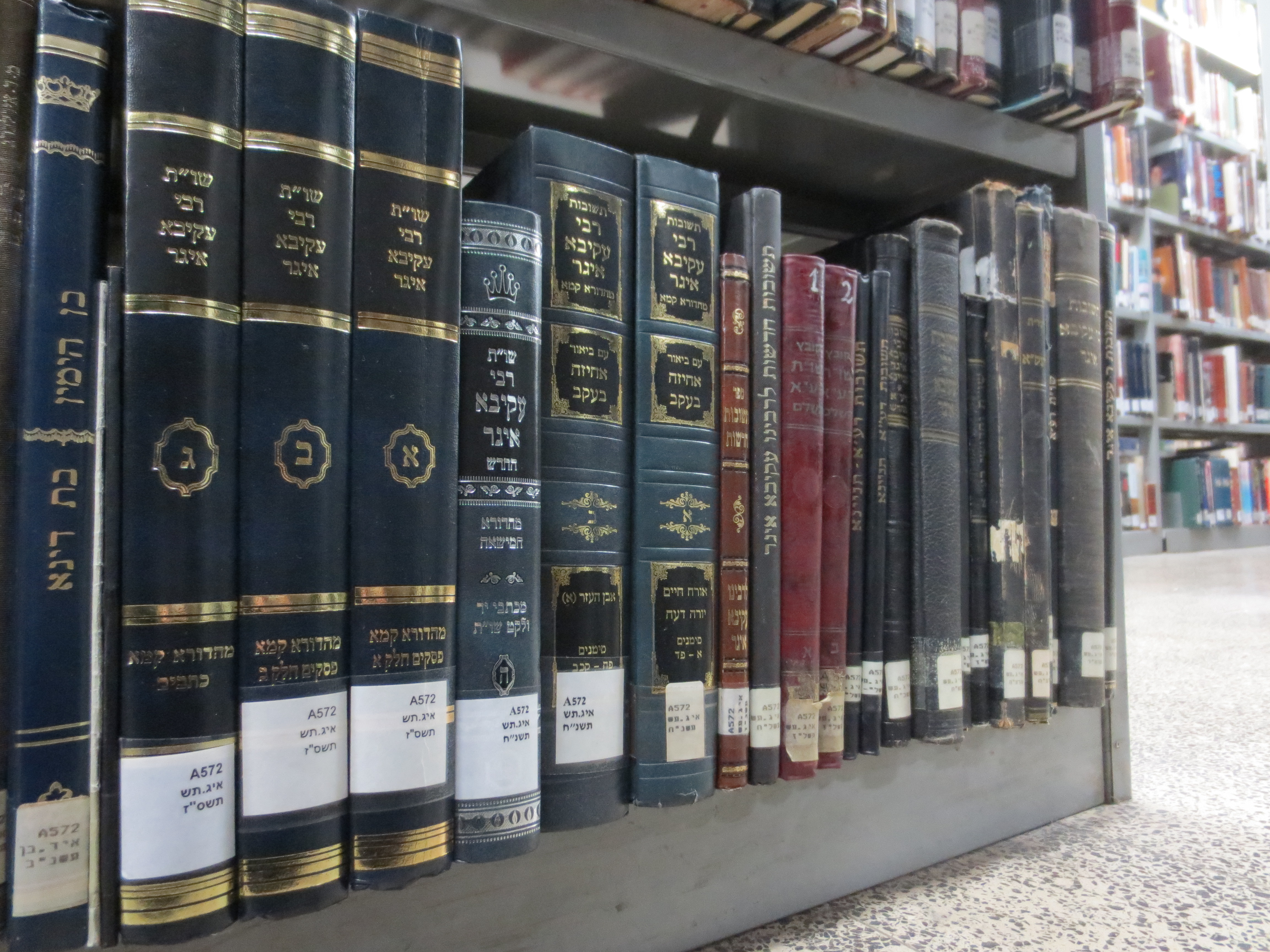
Responsa of Rabbi Akiva Eiger

Jewish law, known in Hebrew as Halakha, was transcribed first in the Mishnah and later in the Talmud, with the differing opinions spread out over sixty three tractates. However, later rabbis — namely the Geonim of the Early Middle Ages, the Rishonim of the High and Late Middle Ages, and the Acharonim of modern times — wrote more conclusive works. Many of these works are responsa (she'eilot u'teshuvot in Hebrew), printed questions and answers.

The Geonim, the leaders of Jewry in the Early Middle Ages primarily in Babylonia, were not prolific writers like later generations. However, among their few writings is the famed Sheiltot de-Rav Ahai written by Rabbi Achai Gaon.

The Rishonim, the leading rabbis of the Middle Ages after the Geonim, have left many written Halakhic works, including the Piskei HaRosh of Rabbi Asher ben Yechiel and the Sefer HaHalakhot of Rabbi Yitzchak Alfasi, both of which are often published in the back of the Talmud; and the Arba'ah Turim, also known as the Tur, of Rabbi Yaakov ben Asher, a four volume work written in attempt to organize Jewish law.

=== Rambam ===
Rabbi Moshe ben Maimon, known as Maimonides or as the Rambam, was a Rishon who lived in Spain, Morocco, and Egypt in the second half of the twelfth century. The author of several books, his most famous is a halakhic work, Mishneh Torah, also known as the Yad HaChazakah or simply as the Rambam, which is fourteen volumes long. Although when it was first written, Mishne Torah received much backlash from contemporary Jewish leaders, it soon became recognized by world Jewry as authentic Torah literature, with many commentaries written on it, including the Ohr Somayach, Tzofnath Paneach and the writings of the Soloveitchik dynasty, including Chiddushei Rabbeinu Chaim by Rabbi Chaim Soloveitchik; works by his sons, Chiddushei HaGram HaLevi of Rabbi Moshe Soloveitchik and Chiddushei Maran Ryz HaLevi of Rabbi Yitzchak Zev Soloveitchik; and by his grandson Rabbi Meshulam Dovid Soloveitchik, titled Chiddushei Rabbeinu Meshulam Dovid Halevi. A student of Rabbi Chaim Soloveitchik, Rabbi Isser Zalman Meltzer wrote his own commentary on the Rambam, titled Even HaEzel.

=== Halakhic works of Acharonim ===
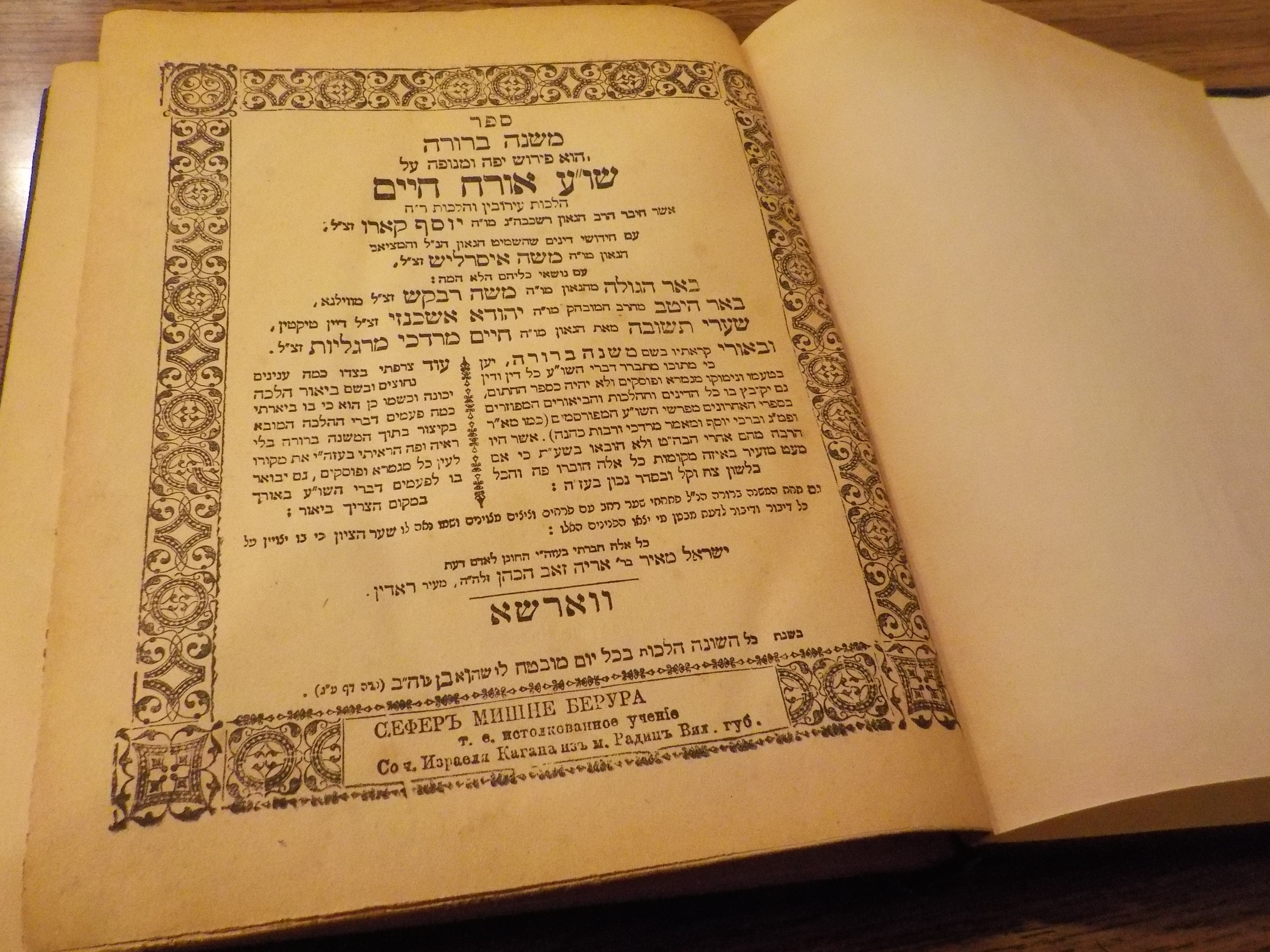
Early edition Mishnah Berurah

Likely the most monumental Halakhic work ever written, Rabbi Yoseph Karo completed the Shulchan Aruch (or Code of Jewish Law, sometimes shortened to Codes) in 1565 in Safed. It was a condensation of his previous Halakhic work, Beit Yosef, which was written as commentary on the Arba'ah Turim. Like the Tur, it was divided into four sections: Orach Chayim, Yoreh De'ah, Even Ha'ezer, and Choshen Mishpat. The Mapah, a commentary on Shulchan Aruch by Rabbi Moshe Isserles (the Rema) is generally printed together with the Shulchan Aruch in the center of the page, albeit in a different font, with the commentaries of Turei Zahav of Rabbi David HaLevi Segal and Magen Avraham of Rabbi Avraham Gombiner or Siftei Kohen of Rabbi Shabbatai HaKohen printed in the margins. Major commentaries written on the Shulchan Aruch include the Ketzos Hachoshen, Avnei Milu'im, and the Nesivos Hamishpat.

Many later Halakhic works were based on Shulchan Aruch. These include Rabbi Shneur Zalman of Liadi's Shulchan Aruch HaRav, Rabbi Yechiel Michel Epstein's Aruch HaShulchan, Rabbi Shlomo Ganzfried's Kitzur Shulchan Aruch, and Rabbi Avraham Danzig's Chayei Adam and Chochmas Adam (only on Orach Chayim and Yoreh De'ah). Mishnah Berurah, a six-volume work expounding on Orach Chayim, was published between 1884 and 1907 and is followed by most Litvishe Jews almost exclusively. Comparative Sephardic works are Kaf HaChaim and Yalkut Yosef. The Ben Ish Hai, by Rabbi Yosef Hayyim, is based on the sermons he delivered, and therefore includes halakha as well as Kabbalah and explanations on the Torah.

Many Halakhic works of the Acharonim are responsa. These include the Igros Moshe of Rabbi Moshe Feinstein, the Noda B'Yehudah of Rabbi Yechezkel Landau, She'eilot U'teshuvot Rabbi Akiva Eiger of Rabbi Akiva Eiger, Beis HaLevi by Rabbi Yosef Dov Soloveitchik, Shevet HaLevi of Rabbi Shmuel Wosner, and Tzitz Eliezer of Rabbi Eliezer Waldenberg. Another notable Halakhic work is the Chofetz Chaim, dealing with the laws of proper speech, and written by Rabbi Yisrael Meir Kagan.

== Hasidism ==
Also known as chasidus, Hasidism is an Orthodox Jewish movement originating in Eastern Europe in the mid-eighteenth century, founded by the Baal Shem Tov. Describing Hasidic thought, Rabbi Aryeh Kaplan writes:

In the teachings of Hasidic masters, one comes across a new way of approaching God and the spiritual. Neither Kabbalah nor philosophy, but experience is the proper way to approach God. "Serve God with gladness!" "Taste and see that God is good!" "For me the closeness of God is best!"... The Hasidic masters used the language of Kabbalah and to a lesser extent that of Jewish philosophy, to teach the average individual how he could experience God.

The first Hasidic book to be published, Toldot Yaakov Yosef by Rabbi Yaakov Yosef of Pollonye and interlaced with quotations from the Baal Shem Tov, was published in 1780. Later Hasidic works include Noam Elimelech by Rabbi Elimelech of Lizensk, Bnei Yissaschar by Rabbi Tzvi Elimelech Spira, Kedushat Levi by Rabbi Levi Yitzchok of Berditchev, and Tanya by Rabbi Shneur Zalman of Liadi.

== Musar ==
While the study of musar (spiritual and interpersonal self-improvement) always existed in Jewish circles, it became more widespread with the start of Musar movement in the nineteenth century. The classic musar library of Shaarei Teshuvah, Chovot HaLevavot, Maalot HaMiddot, Orchot Tzaddikim, Mesillat Yesharim, and Derech Hashem was later expanded with the writings of rabbis and mashgiachs after the Musar movement began. Later works include Rabbi Yisrael Salanter's Or Yisrael, Rabbi Simcha Zissel Ziv's Chochmah U'Mussar, Rabbi Yosef Yozel Horowitz's Madreigas HaAdam, Rabbi Eliyahu Dessler's Michtav MeEliyahu, Rabbi Yeruchom Levovitz's Daas Chochmah U'Mussar and Daas Torah, Rabbi Chaim Shmuelevitz's Sichos Musar, and Rabbi Shlomo Wolbe's Alei Shur.

== See also ==
- Ancient Hebrew writings
- Rabbinic literature
