= Ketzos HaChoshen =

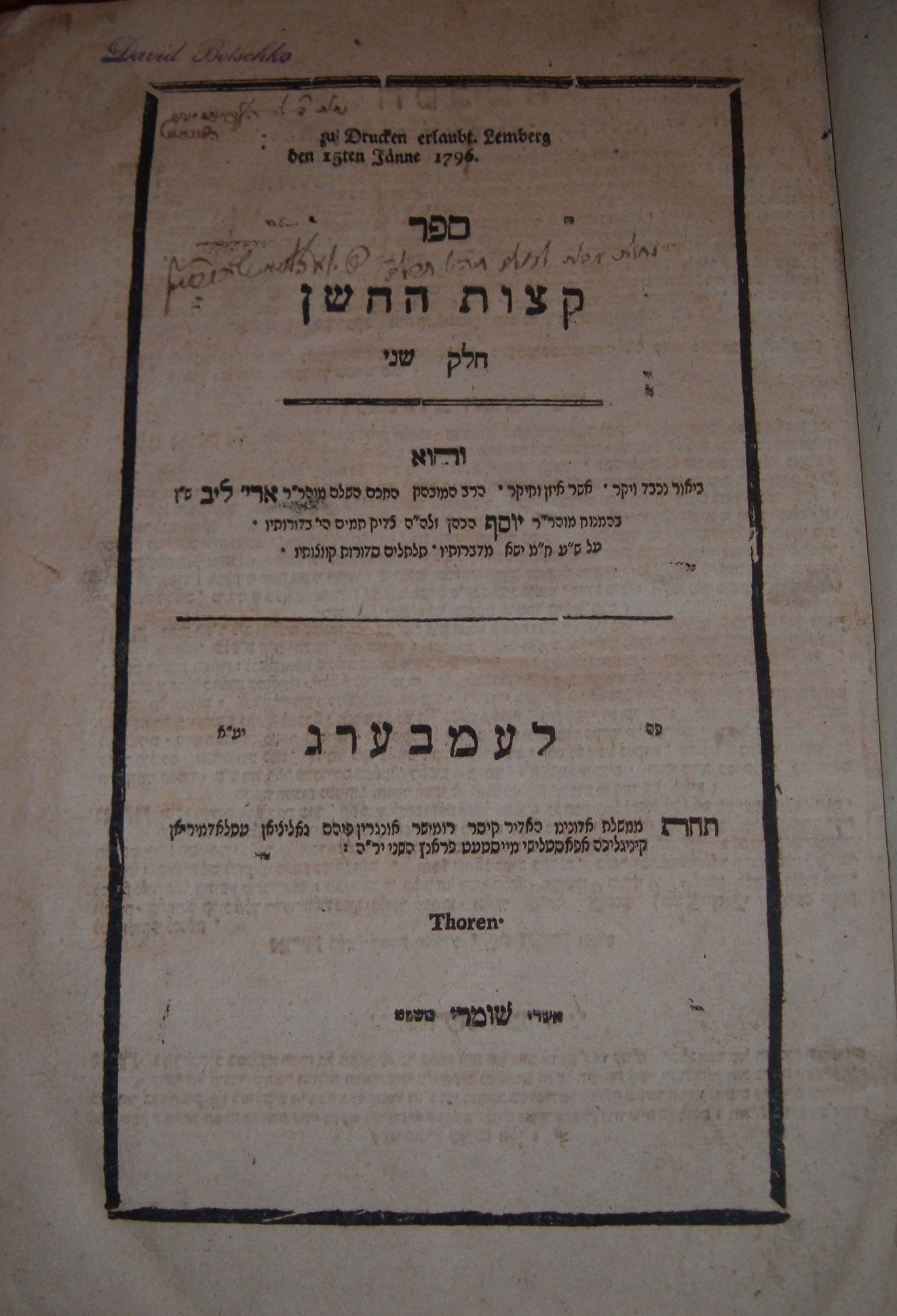
1796 Lviv

The Ketzos HaChoshen (Hebrew: קצות החושן, lit. 'Edges of the priestly breastplate'; Ashkenazi Hebrew Yiddish pronunciation: [ˌkɛt͜sos haˈχoʃɛn]) is a major writing by Aryeh Leib Heller (1745–1812) and the origin of his nickname, "the Ketzos". Its first printing was in Lviv.

== Importance ==
The Ketzos HaChoshen is a halakhic work that explains difficult passages in the Shulchan Aruch, Choshen Mishpat (which deals mainly with business and financial laws such as contracts, witnesses, etc.) with novel ideas proposed by Aryeh Leib. Familiarity with this work is considered mandatory for any Torah scholar or Dayan. It is customarily studied in conjunction with the Nesivos HaMishpat of Yaakov Lorberbaum, who often controverted Heller's conclusions on many points.

The Ketzos's sefer is often published in tandem with his brother Yehuda Heller Kahana's book, Kuntras HaSfeikos, as a two-volume set.
