= Oksana Franko =

Ukrainian historian, ethnologist, and archivist (1939–2021)

- Оксана Франко
- Born: 19 March 1939; Pidhirky, Poland (now part of Kalush, Ukraine)
- Died: 17 September 2021 (aged 82); Lviv, Ukraine
- Education: University of Lviv

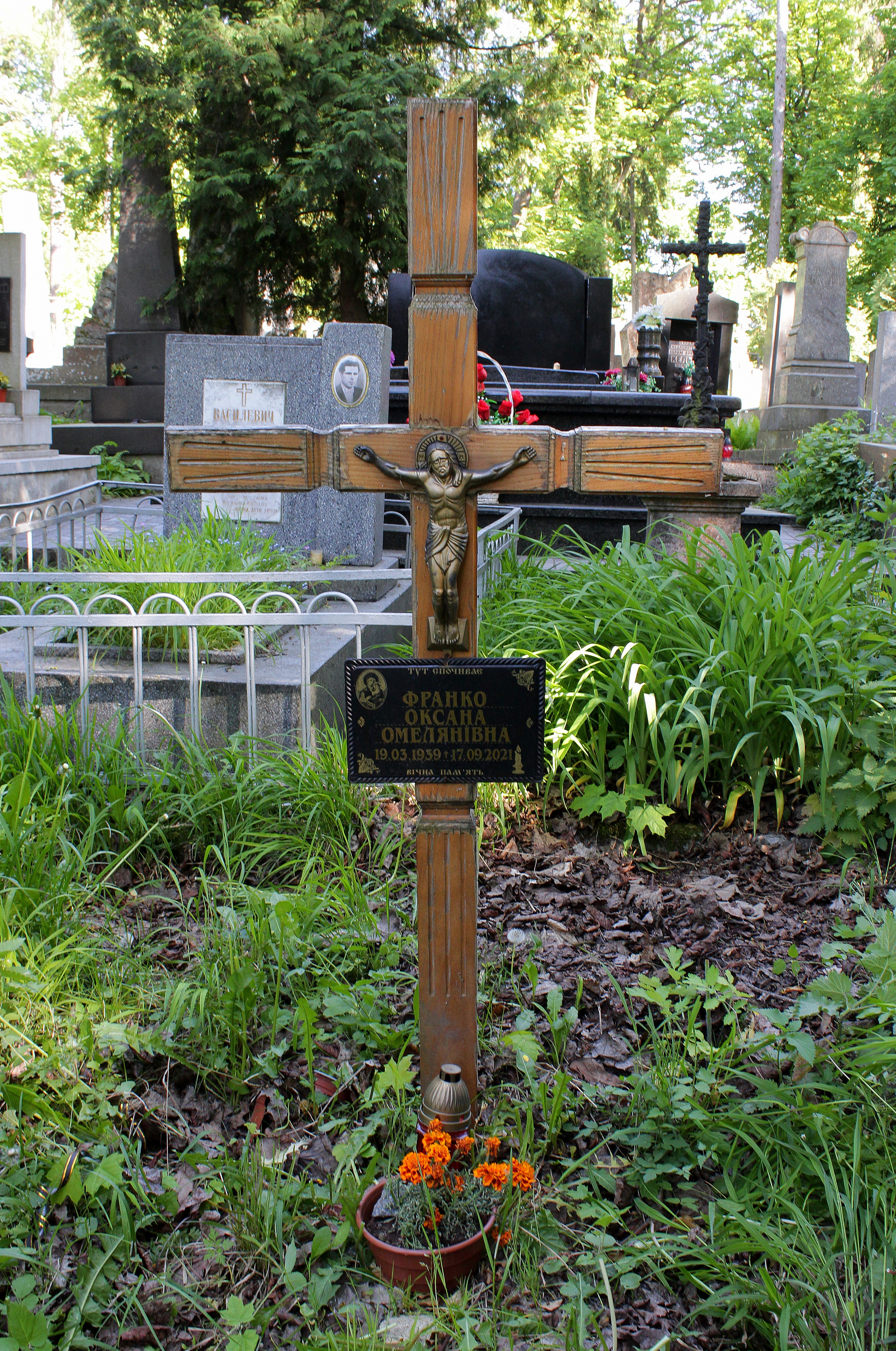
Oksana Franko's grave at Lychakiv Cemetery

Oksana Omelianivna Franko (Ukrainian: Оксана Омелянівна Франко; 19 March 1939 – 17 September 2021) was a Ukrainian historian, ethnologist, archivist, educator, public figure. Doctor of Historical Sciences (2000), Professor (2004). Full member of the Shevchenko Scientific Society. Honorary citizen of Kalush (1997). Wife of Dmytro Danyliuk; granddaughter of Onufrii Franko (brother of Ivan Franko).

== Biography ==
Oksana Franko was born on 19 March 1939 in Pidhirky (now a neighborhood of the same name in Kalush) to Omelian Franko and Anna Tatsuniak.

She studied at Kalush Secondary School No. 1 (1955). She graduated from the History Department of University of Lviv (1960). In 1995, she completed an internship at the European Center of the Shevchenko Scientific Society in Paris (Sarcelles).

She worked as a researcher at the central state archives (1960–1968), a senior researcher, head of a department at the Central State Historical Archives of Ukraine in Kyiv (1968–1975), and head of the Scientific Archives of the NASU Institute of Archaeology (1975–1990).

From 1991 Franko was a member of the faculty at the University of Lviv: Docent (1994), Professor (2004) of the Department of History and Ethnography of Ukraine (later reorganized into the Department of Ethnology); member of the Academic Council of the Faculty of History. She was a member of the editorial boards of scientific publications.

Died on 17 September 2021 in Lviv. She was buried on 20 September 2021 on the 4th field of Lychakiv Cemetery.

=== Public activities ===
In 1976, together with human rights activists Myroslav Marynovych, Mykola Matusevych, Olha Heiko-Matusevych, and Nadiya Svitlychna, she visited the grave of the artist and dissident Alla Horska at the Berkovets cemetery.

In 1992, together with her son Andrii, she organized the Ivan Franko Family Museum in Kalush, for which she donated her own house.

== Works ==
Franko was the author of over 200 scientific publications, monographs, and 20 reviews of the archival heritage of prominent Ukrainian archaeologists, including Fedir Vovk, Danylo Shcherbakivskyi, Vikentiy Khvoyka, Serhii Hamchenko, Volodymyr Hrinchenko, Mykola Makarenko, and Dmytro Yavornytskyi. For the first time, she named and published materials of archaeologists repressed and banned in the 1930s and 1940s: Mykola Makarenko, Petro Kurinnyi, Yevheniia Kozlovska, Vadym Shcherbakivskyi, and Fedir Kozubovskyi. She also worked with the heritage of Ivan Franko, Volodymyr Hnatiuk, and others.

She published the monographs "Fedir Vovk" (1997), "Fedir Vovk – vchenyi i hromadskyi diiach" (2001). Co-author of the publications "Kyrylo-Mefodiivske tovarystvo" (in 3 volumes, 1990), "Shchodennyk O. F. Kistiakivskoho" (in 2 volumes, 1994; 1995), "Ukrainske natsionalne vidrodzhennia v dokumentakh ta memuarakh" (1996), "Lystuvannia Fedora Vovka z Volodymyrom Hnatiukov" (2001). He is one of the compilers of additional 51-53 volumes to the publication "I. Franko. Zibrannia tvoriv u 50-ty tomakh" (2008).

She defended her doctoral dissertation "Naukova ta suspilno-politychna diialnist Fedora Kindratovycha Vovka" (2000).

Participant in archaeological expeditions; organizer of the scientific conference "Taras Shevchenko and Archaeology", exhibitions of scientific and artistic works, and meetings.

== Awards ==
- Honorary Citizen of Kalush (1997)
- Medal of the Presidium of the Supreme Soviet of the Ukrainian SSR "In memory of the 1500th anniversary of Kyiv" (1983)
- the award "Independence of Ukraine – 10 years" (2001)
- Certificate of honor from the Main Department of Tourism and Culture of Ivano-Frankivsk Regional State Administration (2007).

== Sources ==
- Франко Оксана Омелянівна // Жінки України / Спілка жінок України, Інститут гуманітарних досліджень Української академії наук національного прогресу; уклад. Л. Г. Андрієнко [та ін.]; голов. ред. М. А. Орлик, К. : Фенікс, 2001, 560 s. ISBN 966-651-002-2.
- Франко Оксана Омелянівна // Калущина в іменах : біографічний довідник / М. Когут, Дрогобич : «Відродження», 1999, 216 s.
- Наталія Мельник (7 April 2019). "Оксана Франко. 80-та весна". Вікна.
- "17 вересня 2021 р. у Львові у віці 82 роки померла знаний історик, етнолог, архівіст, доктор історичних наук, професор, дійсний член НТШ Оксана Омелянівна Франко". Наукове товариство ім. Шевченка. 20 September 2021.
