= Aryeh Leib Heller =

Galician rabbi (d. 1812)

Personal life
- Children: Yosef; David; Zvi Hirsch; Franziska Freide
- Parents: Yosef HaCohen Kahana-Heller; Nissel Kahana-Heller

Religious life
- Religion: Judaism

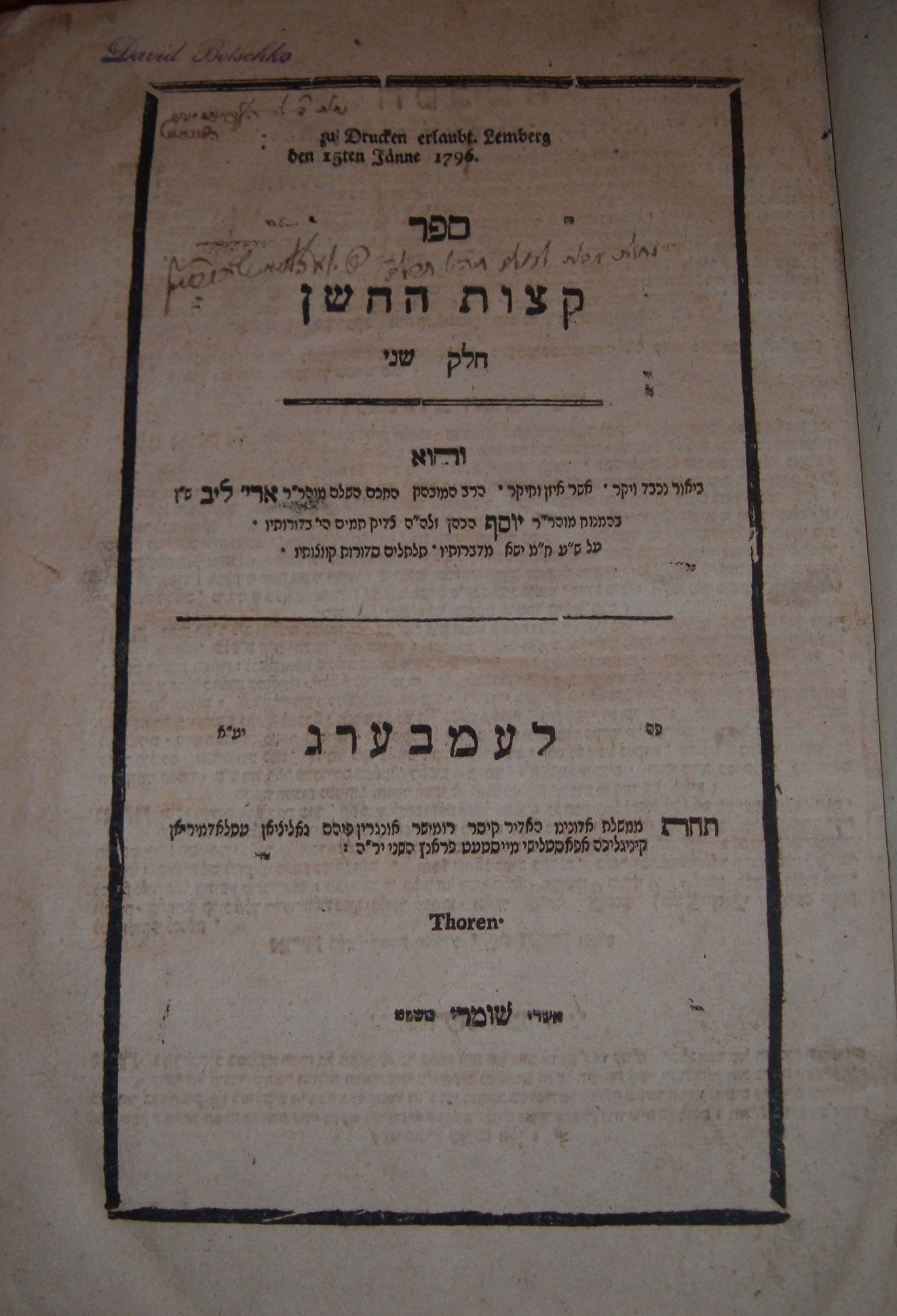
Ktzot.jpg

Aryeh Leib Kahana Heller (c. 1745 – 1812) (Hebrew: אריה לייב בן יוסף הכהן הלר) was a Rabbi, Talmudist, and Halachist in Galicia. He was known as "The Ketzos" based on his magnum opus, Ketzot Hachoshen (Hebrew: קצות החושן).

== Biography ==
Born about 1745 in the Galician town of Kalush (presently located in Ukraine), Heller was a fifth-generation descendant of Rabbi Yom-Tov Lipmann Heller. Heller was the youngest of five brothers, including Chaim, Mordechai, Daniel, and Yehuda (author of Kuntras HaSfeikos), and one sister (about whom nothing is currently known).

In his youth, after being recognized by his father as a prodigy, Heller was sent to learn Torah from Rabbi Meshulam Igra of Tysmienica, Poland, an outstanding authority.

From 1788 to 1812, he was rabbi of Stryi, a position later to be held by his opponent in many halachic debates, Rabbi Yaakov Lorberbaum. He had four children: a daughter, Franziska Freide (1788–1842), who married Solomon Judah Loeb Rapoport (Shi'r) in 1810, and three sons: Yosef (1769–1832), David (1771–1830), and Zwi Hirsch (1776–1834). Heller was a staunch misnaged and prominent critic of the Hasidic movement. Rabbi Heller's works became widely disseminated throughout Europe at a time when, due to technical and financial reasons, this kind of recognition was rare.

== Works ==
R. Aryeh Leib Heller wrote three major works:

1. Ketzot HaChoshen (Ends of the Breastplate, published 1785) is a halachic work which explains difficult passages in the Shulchan Aruch, Choshen Mishpat (which deals mainly with business and financial laws such as contracts, witnesses, etc.) with novel ideas proposed by Rabbi Aryeh Leib. This remarkable work is considered a classic. Familiarity with this work is considered mandatory for any Torah scholar and it is a fixture in any Talmudic library. It is customarily studied in conjunction with R. Yaakov Lorberbaum's Netivot ha-Mishpat, which seeks to controvert R. Heller's conclusions on many points. Rabbi Heller in reply wrote a book Meshoveiv Nesivos "that responds to the words of the author of Netivot", as its introduction, and Rabbi Lorberbaum responded again to his objections in a later edition of "Netivot". Heller's brother Yehuda's book, Kuntras Ha'Sfeikos, is often published in tandem with the "Ketzos".
2. Avnei Milluim (Filling Stones) is a halachic work which explains difficult passages in the Shulchan Aruch, Even HaEzer (which deals mainly with marital issues) with novel ideas proposed by him.
3. Shev Shema'tata (7 Passages) is a work composed of seven sections, each with approximately 25 chapters, which explains intricate halachic topics including the validity of a single witness and the practical ramifications of a doubt. The reasoning process that Heller employs to analyse and resolve these very basic conflicts and contradictions in the Talmud is considered the basis for the analytical method used in modern times in Talmudic study. Testimony to the critical nature of this seminal work is the fact that it was one of the few texts chosen by the Vaad Hatzalah (the post-World War II organization which saved Jews and helped them re-integrate into society) to be copied and disseminated. Although an early form of this work was initially presented by him when he was still a young man during his seven days of celebration after his wedding, it was actually one of his later publications and underwent significant editing by the author. His introduction to this celebrated work includes some profound Biblical exegesis.

== Family significance ==
As indicated by the HaCohen in his name, Rabbi Aryeh Leib Heller was descended from the family of Aaron, the original High Priest, and therefore was a member of the priestly class. Many kohanim today claim to be descendants of Leib Heller's family, including the current Toldos Aharon Rebbe, but proof is difficult to establish without proper lineage data. Typically, the claim of lineage to Rabbi Heller is a tradition passed on through the generations for prestige reasons. His brother's descendants include Rabbi Yehuda Amital.
