= Shev Shema'tata =

Shev Shema'tata (Hebrew: שב שמעתתא), most commonly pronounced Shev Shmaytsa or Shev Shmaisa, is a work on Talmudic logic and methodology by R. Aryeh Leib HaCohen Heller. The name of the book is Aramaic, and means "seven passages".

It consists of seven sections, each with approximately 25 chapters, which explains intricate halakhic topics including the validity of a single witness and the practical ramifications of a doubt. The reasoning process that Heller employs to analyse and resolve these very basic conflicts and contradictions in the Talmud is considered the basis for the analytical method used in modern times in Talmudic study.

Although an early form of this work was initially presented by R. Heller when he was still a young man during his seven days of celebration after his wedding, it was actually one of his later publications and underwent significant editing by the author.

== Contents ==
=== Introduction ===
R. Heller's introduction to this celebrated work explains his outlook on Judaism, and includes complex and profound biblical exegesis. His basic stance is a blend of Kabbalah and Italian Neoplatonism, somewhat similar to that found in Isaiah Horowitz's Shene Luchot ha-Berit and the works of Moshe Chaim Luzzatto. The starting point is a doctrine of the Fall, according to which the effect of Adam's sin was a confusion between soul and body, causing the soul to become dependent on the gratification of the body's desires. The correct relationship is one in which the body is simply an instrument for the soul, and the purpose of religious endeavour is to restore this position. Through analysis of a series of Biblical incidents, he illustrates his contention that there would be no value in an understanding and observance of Torah that was ready-made and which one had no choice but to follow. Rather, just as practical halachah is a code which one strives to follow using one's free will, so the intellectual content of Torah is presented in a cryptic and open-ended form the value of which depends on one's struggle to understand it. Talmudic analysis is accordingly the highest form of religious endeavour, and the purpose of the book is to furnish the tools for this activity.

=== The Shema'tata ===
The overall subject of the book is the way in which Jewish law addresses doubts, either as to the facts or as to the applicable law. The Talmud provides a series of presumptions, in favour of strictness or leniency depending on the circumstances. One series of questions concerns the way in which these presumptions interact. Another is the more fundamental question of how presumptions work. That is, does a presumption have the effect of assimilating the doubtful cases to the certain cases in all respects, or are doubtful cases a third category with its own special laws, alongside the certainly included and the certainly excluded?

Although each section focuses on a specific Halachic principle, invariably other principles are brought up and discussed. These principles involve focal points that have applications throughout the entire Rabbinical corpus. Heller's method is to test each principle against a variety of Talmudic passages. If the concept would cause a difficulty in the passage (e.g. the concept should apply and doesn't), Heller resolves the difficulty by demonstrating that for whatever reason this passage doesn't fit underneath the rubric of that particular concept (see Casuistry). In this way the exact boundaries of each principle are clearly defined, thus clarifying the exact applications of each principle.

==== Section One ====
The first section analyses whether the concept of "A doubt in a biblical issue is dealt with stringently" is actually a biblical concept itself or whether it is entirely of Rabbinic origin. This section continues into a discussion of the principles that, if there is a doubt concerning a case of spiritual impurity, if this occurred in the public domain we rule leniently and in the private domain stringently (Sotah 28b). Finally, the ruling that in a case of Sefek Sefeika - a case of doubt in which one side of the question is itself subject to doubt - we rule leniently is explained. The reason is that since most sides of this question lean to the lenient side, the principle of Rov - that we follow the majority - is called in and we rule leniently.

==== Section Two ====
The second section analyses the presumption of chazakah. Chazakah is the presumption that in case of doubt one may assume that the physical or legal status of the object (or person) in question remains constant. At this point the focus is on Chezkat Ha'Guf - that the physical status of the object remains unchanged - and Chezkat Mammon - that we assume that an object belongs to its current possessor unless otherwise proven. The relative strengths of these two Chazakot are compared and contrasted. Also the importance of the strength of each parties claim is analysed - in a case where one party is doubtful of his claim then a chazakah may not decide the case.

==== Section Three ====
The third section builds on the previous section. The focal passage here is Niddah 2b - this discusses a case in which we were certain about the status of an object (in that passage a ritual bath) on day one and again on day seven but we are unsure about the time in between (days 2–6). The question is whether the certainty on day one is of primary importance in deciding the status of the next few days (Chazakah D' Me'ikara) or the certainty of day seven is more important (Chazaka D' Hashta). Heller points out (based on various Talmudic passages) that if the object is likely to change (in his example a girl who is likely to mature) then the Chazakah D'Hashta takes precedence.

==== Section Four ====
Section Four discusses the principle (Bava Batra 23b) that in case of a conflict between the principle that we follow the majority (Rov) and the presumption that if an object is found near a certain place we can assume the object originated in that place (Karov) the law of Rov has decisive power. It further discusses the power of Rov in regards to monetary cases and the power of Rov to take an object away from its present possessor.

==== Section Five ====
Section Five involves a disagreement among the Rishonim. This refers to case wherein a person or object is under the influence of a specific type of spiritual impurity or halachic prohibition. The subject then becomes involved with something that leaves it under a doubt of a different type of prohibition or impurity and then becomes cleared of the original impurity. The question is whether the Chazakah of the first impurity holds good to decide his status in reference to the second impurity.

==== Section Six ====
This section compares the power of a single witness (that is believed for prohibitions and to require an oath) and the power of Chazakah. The status of two sets of witnesses contradicting each other is also discussed.

==== Section Seven ====
Section Seven discusses the Halachic concept that an ordinarily unfit witness (e.g. a child) is believed if in the middle of an ordinary conversation he mentions something in passing. The belief of certain people who state that they recognize a specific object or person without mentioning specific identifying characteristics is also elaborated.

== Influence ==
Rabbi Aryeh Leib HaCohen Heller's approach was influential in the nineteenth century Lithuanian school, and Shimon Shkop's work Sha'are Yosher is widely regarded as based on the earlier work.
