= Kalush urban hromada =

Urban hromada in Ivano-Frankivsk Oblast, Ukraine

Kalush urban hromada Калуська міська громада
- Hromada
- Seal
- Interactive map of Kalush urban hromada
- Country: Ukraine
- Oblast: Ivano-Frankivsk
- Raion: Kalush

Area
  - Total: 265.5 km^{2} (102.5 sq mi)

Population (2023)
  - Total: 88,154
  - Density: 332.0/km^{2} (860.0/sq mi)
- Settlements: 17
- Cities: 1
- Villages: 16
- Website: kalushcity.gov.ua

Kalush urban territorial hromada (Ukrainian: Калуська міська територіальна громада, romanized: Kaluska miska terytorialna hromada) is a hromada located in Kalush Raion, in the western Ivano-Frankivsk Oblast of Ukraine. Its administrative centre is the city of Kalush.

Kalush urban hromada has an area of 265.5 km^{2} (102.5 mi^{2}). It has a population of 88,154 (as of 2023).

== Settlements ==
In addition to one city (Kalush), the hromada contains 16 villages:

- Babyn-Zarichnyi
- Bodnariv
- Vistova
- Holyn
- Dovhe-Kaluske
- Kopanky
- Kropyvnyk
- Mysliv
- Mostyshche
- Piylo
- Ripianka
- Seredniy Babyn
- Sivka-Kaluska
- Studinka
- Tuzhyliv
- Yavorivka
