= Yaakov Lorberbaum =

Galician rabbi (1760–1832)

Rabbi Yaakov ben Yaakov Moshe Lorberbaum
- Title: Chief Rabbi

Personal life
- Born: 1760 Leszno, Poland
- Died: 25 May 1832 (aged 71–72) Stryj, Galicia
- Notable work(s): Chavas Daas, Nesivos HaMishpat, Toras Gittin, Beis Yaakov, Emes L'Yaakov, Mekor Chayim, Kehillas Yaakov, Derech Chaim, Imrei Yosher, Masei Nissim, Nachalas Yaakov
- Known for: Chavas Daas, Nesivos HaMishpat
- Occupation: Rabbi, Posek

Religious life
- Religion: Judaism

Senior posting
- Post: Chief Rabbi of Kalush; Chief Rabbi of Lissa; Chief Rabbi of Kalish

Jacob Lorberbaum or Jacob ben Jacob Moses of Lissa (1760-1832) , Hebrew: יעקב בן יעקב משה מליסא) was a rabbi and posek. He is most commonly known as the Ba'al HaChavas Da'as or the Ba'al HaNesivos for his most well-known works, or as the "Lissa Rav" for the city in which he was Chief Rabbi.

== Biography ==
Lorberbaum was the great-grandson of Tzvi Ashkenazi. According to one tradition, his father, Yaakov Moshe, died before he was born. His relative, Joseph ben Meir Teomim, the rabbi of Bursztyn, brought him up. This accounts for the common name that both father and son share. Another tradition states that before he was born, his father fell ill, and dreamed that he would recover in the merit of the son that would be born to him. In the merit of his future son, the father took his name-to-be. Another legend is that at his naming ceremony, his father was preoccupied with his study and thought they asked for his name. He studied under Meshullam Egra.

He was head of the beth din in Kalush, Ukraine. In 1809, he agreed to become the Rav in Lissa (now Leszno, Poland), where he enlarged his yeshiva's enrollment. Hundreds of scholars came to study there in the years of his leadership. Among his students were Elijah Gutmacher, Zvi Hirsch Kalischer, and Rabbi Shraga Feivel Danziger.

Along with Akiva Eiger and Eiger's son-in-law, the Moses Sofer, Lorberbaum vehemently fought the maskilim, the proponents of the Haskalah. In 1822, he left Lissa and returned to Kalish, where he wrote many of his works. He lived there for ten years.

He was widely respected as a posek and is one of three authorities on whom Shlomo Ganzfried based his rulings in the Kitzur Shulchan Aruch, the well-known précis of Halakha. Similarly, the Hokhmat Adam of Avraham Danzig was written in consultation with Lorberbaum and Chaim of Volozhin.

His status was such that it is reported that Eiger once fainted when he was honored with an Aliyah in place of Jacob. (See Shimusha Shel Torah, Meir Tzvi Bergman).

Lorberbaum died in Stryi, then in Galicia, on 25 May 1832.

== Works ==
Reb Yaakov wrote many works of Torah on Talmud and on Halacha (Jewish law).

- Works on Talmud include:
  - Toras Gittin, commentary on Shulchan Aruch, Even HaEzer, 119-155, and chiddushim on the Talmudic treatise Gittin (Frankfort-on-the-Oder, 1813; Warsaw, 1815)
  - Beis Yaakov, commentary on Shulchan Aruch, Even HaEzer, 66-118, and on the Talmudic tractate Ketubot (Grubeschow, 1823)
  - Emes L'Yaakov (on aggadah)
  - He also published his late father's works on the Talmud, including his famous novellae to Tractate Keritot
- Works of Halacha include:
  - Chavas Daas, commentary on Shulchan Aruch, Yoreh Deah, 69-201; the earlier sections of Yoreh Deah (1-68) are very briefly dealt with in the form of an introduction to the work (Lemberg, 1799; Dyhernfurth, 1810, and often since in editions of the Yoreh Deah, as the Vilna 1894 ed.). In it the works of earlier commentators are discussed and somewhat pilpulistically developed.
  - Mekor chayim, commentary on Shulchan Aruch, Orach Chayim, 429 and following, with notes on the commentaries Turei Zahav and Magen Avraham; the second part contains chiddushim on Keritot (Zolkiev, 1807; Frankfort-on-the-Oder, 1813; Warsaw, 1825; Dyhernfurth, 1827)
  - Nesivos HaMishpat on Shulchan Aruch, Choshen Mishpat, in two parts (Dyhernfurth, Lemberg; Zolkiev, 1809, 1816; Sudilkov, 1830; and often since in Lemberg editions of Shulchan Aruch, Choshen Mishpaṭ). It is said that Nesivos HaMishpat was made famous by the strong attacks in it against the Ketzos HaChoshen of Rabbi Aryeh Leib Heller.
  - Kehillas Yaakov, a collection of discussions and notes on several legal points in the Even HaEzer and Orach Chayim
  - Derech Chaim on Orach Chayim (Zolkiev, 1828; Altona, 1831). This compendium is very popular and was frequently reprinted in the larger Hebrew prayer-books. These dinim are taken either from later exponents of the Law as contained in the works Turei Zahav, Magen Abraham, Pri Megadim, etc., or from his own decisions. The sources from which he borrowed are usually indicated.
- Other works by Rabbi Lorberbaum include:
  - Imrei Yosher, commentary on the Five Megillot (ib. 1815 and 1819). The commentary on each Megillah is under a different name.
    - Tzror HaMor, commentary on Song of Songs
    - Palgei Mayim, commentary on Lamentations
    - Talumos Chochmah, commentary on Ecclesiastes (Lemberg, 1804; Dyhernfurth, 1819)
    - Megillas S'tarim, commentary on the Book of Esther
    - Imrei Yosher, commentary on Ruth
  - Masei Nissim, a commentary on the Pesach Haggadah, with the text and a short compendium of the Passover ritual (Kitzur Dinim; Zolkiev, 1807, 1835; Minsk, 1816; Dyhernfurth, 1817, and later)
  - Nachalas Yaakov (Breslau, 1849), published by his cousin Naphtali Z. Chachamowicz after his death, comprising sermons on the Torah Portion, halachic decisions, responsa, and his last will. In this famous ethical will he asked that his sons devote time every day to learn at least one page of Gemara.

=== Commemoration ===
- A street in Modi'in Illit is named after his book Nesivos HaMishpat, and a street in Kfar Hassidim is named after him.
