= Meshullam Egra =

Personal life
- Born: c. 1752 Buczacz, Galicia
- Died: 25 September 1801 Presburg

Religious life
- Religion: Judaism

Moses Meshullam ben Samson Egra (Hebrew: משה משולם בן שמשון איגרא; c. 1752 – 25 September 1801) was Galician rabbi.

== Biography ==
Egra was born in Buczacz, Galicia, but was living in Brody by the age of nine. At about that age he delivered a casuistic homily in the large synagogue of Brody, and had a discussion with its rabbi, Isaac Hurwitz, whose son-in-law he became. He was a contemporary of Sender Margoliouth, with whom he discussed ritual laws, and the master of Jacob Lissa. Egra was at first rabbi of Tusmenetz, later becoming rabbi of Presburg. He wrote She'elot u-Teshubot RaMA (Czernowitz, 1862), and an unpublished work on Maimonides.
