= Yehuda Heller Kahana =

Galician rabbi and talmudist (1743–1819)

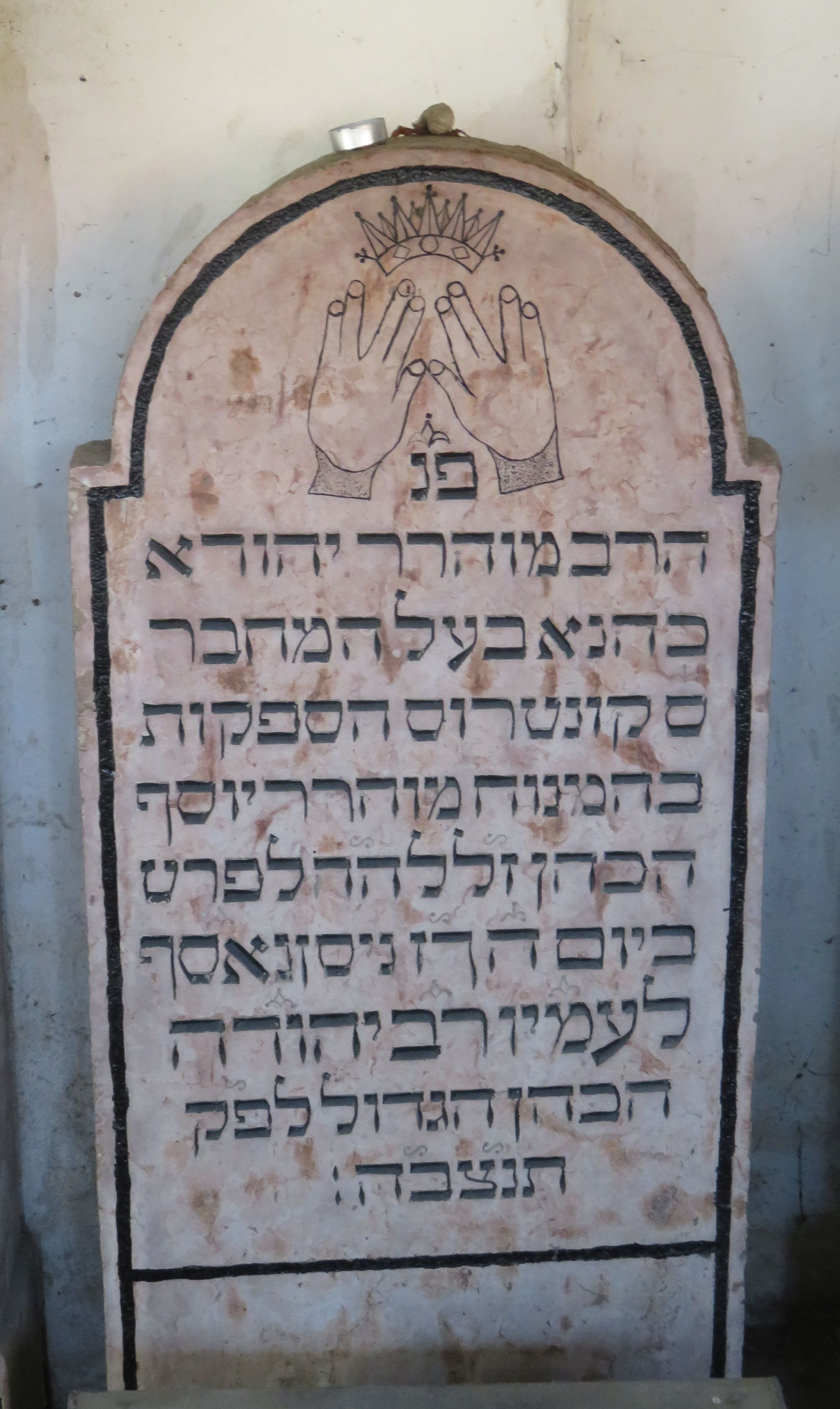

Yehuda Heller-Kahane (2 December 1743 – 22 April 1819) (Hebrew: יהודה בן יוסף הכהן) was a Rabbi, Talmudist, and Halachist in Galicia. He was known as "the Kuntras HaSfeikos" based on his work, Kuntras HaSfeikos (Hebrew: קונטרס הספיקות).

== Life and works ==
In 1743, Yehuda was born to his father Yosef in the Galician town of Kalush, now in Ukraine. Contrary to some historical reports, Yehuda was not a fourth-generation descendant of Yom-Tov Lipmann Heller, but fifth generation. The family tree is shown in Yom Tov's biography. He was one of five brothers (with Chaim, Mordechai, Daniel, and Aryeh Leib Heller) and one sister.

He was the first rabbi of Sighet, Transylvania in the Kingdom of Hungary, now Sighetu Marmației in Romania).

Yehuda wrote the Kuntras HaSfeikos, which documents cases in the Gemara regarding monetary disputes, and the Terumas Hakri, a commentary on the Shulchan Aruch.
