= Kalush, Ukraine =

Urban locality in Ivano-Frankivsk Oblast, Ukraine

Kalush Калуш Kałusz
- City
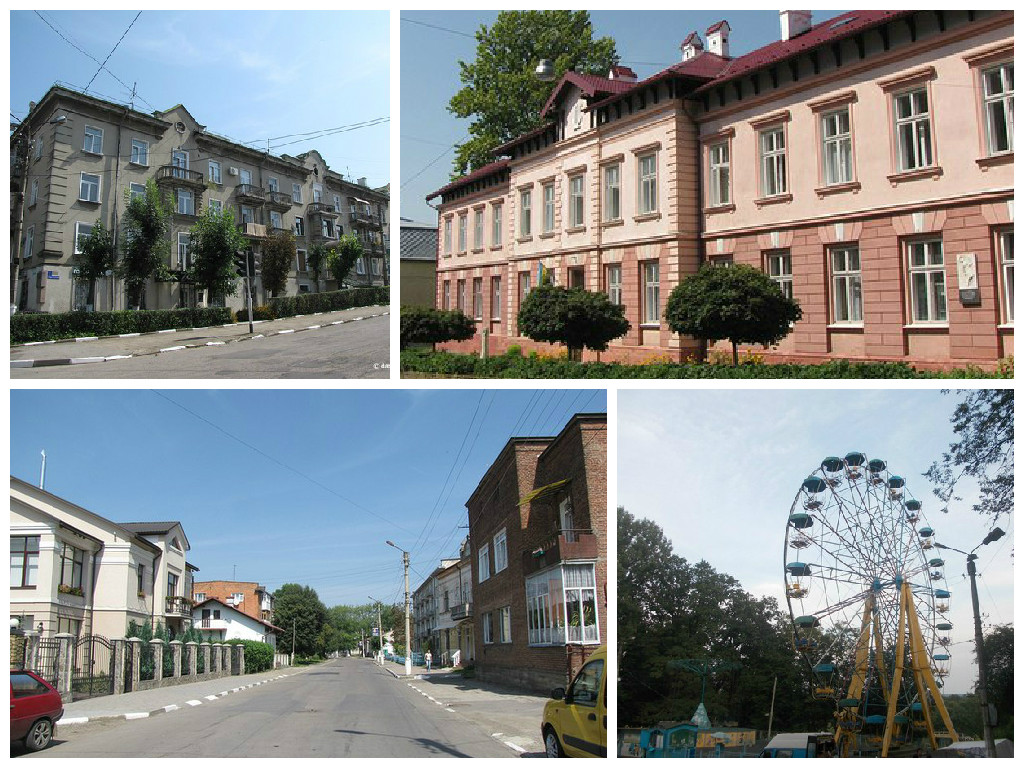
- Clockwise from top left: residential building; Music School; Ferris Wheel in the Ivan Franko Park; a street

- Flag Coat of arms

- Location within Ivano-Frankivsk Oblast Location within Ukraine
- Coordinates: 49°02′39″N 24°21′35″E
- Country: Ukraine
- Oblast: Ivano-Frankivsk Oblast
- Raion: Kalush Raion
- Hromada: Kalush urban hromada
- Established: 20 March 1972
- Subdivisions: List: 1 city municipality

Government
  - Mayor: Andrii Naida

Area
  - Total: 65 km^{2} (25 sq mi)

Population (2022)
  - Total: 65,088
  - Density: 1,000/km^{2} (2,600/sq mi)
- Time zone: UTC+2 (EET)
  - Summer (DST): UTC+3 (EEST)
- Postal index: 77301—77312
- Area code: 380 3472-
- Website: http://kalush.net

Kalush (Ukrainian: Калуш [ˈkɑlʊʃ]; Polish: Kałusz) is a city set in the foothills of the Carpathian Mountains, in Ivano-Frankivsk Oblast (province) of western Ukraine. It is the administrative centre of Kalush Raion (district) and hosts the administration of Kalush urban hromada, one of the hromadas of Ukraine. Its estimated population was 65,088 (2022 estimate). Its important local industries include chemicals and concrete.

== Geography ==
Kalush is located in the western portion of Ivano-Frankivsk Oblast, in the region of Western Ukraine at the foothills of the Carpathian Mountains. It stands in a lowland area on the Dniester tributaries Sivka and Limnytsia that begin from the slopes of the Carpathians. The city is at the eastern border of the ethnographical region of Boyko Land. It belongs to the geographic region of Galician Prykarpattia.

== History ==
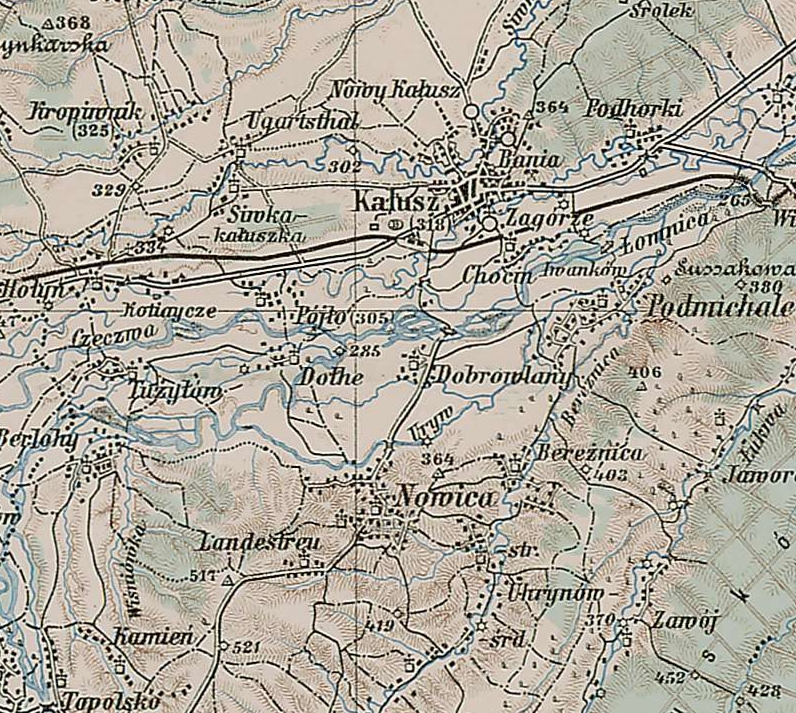
1889, Kałusz

The area of modern-day Kalush was settled already during the Neolithic period.

The earliest known mention of Kalush is the accounting of a village of that name in a chronicle dated May 27, 1437. At that time, together with all Red Ruthenia, the village belonged to the Kingdom of Poland and was known under its Polish name, Kałusz. Until the mid-16th century, Kałusz was part of Halicz Land, Ruthenian Voivodeship. It was known for producing malt, its brewery, and salt mining. In 1469, King Kazimierz Jagiellonczyk founded a Roman Catholic parish church there.

In 1549 Kalush was incorporated as a city by Crown Hetman Mikołaj Sieniawski on the authority of the Polish Crown (Magdeburg rights). Already then Kalush became also known as a city of chemical industry specializing in producing nitrate. The contemporary city coat of arms is derived from the Leliwa coat of arms of the Sieniawski family and is dedicated to the victory in the Battle of Vienna, while the upper portion of the shield contains three white salt furnaces. In 1595 Kalush, which had 55 houses, was ransacked by Crimean Tatars. Here, two important battles took place. In 1672, forces of Hetman Jan Sobieski clashed with Tatars of Selim I Giray, and three years later, Andrzej Potocki fought here with Turks. In 1772, following the Partitions of Poland, the town was seized by the Habsburg Empire, where it remained until 1918.

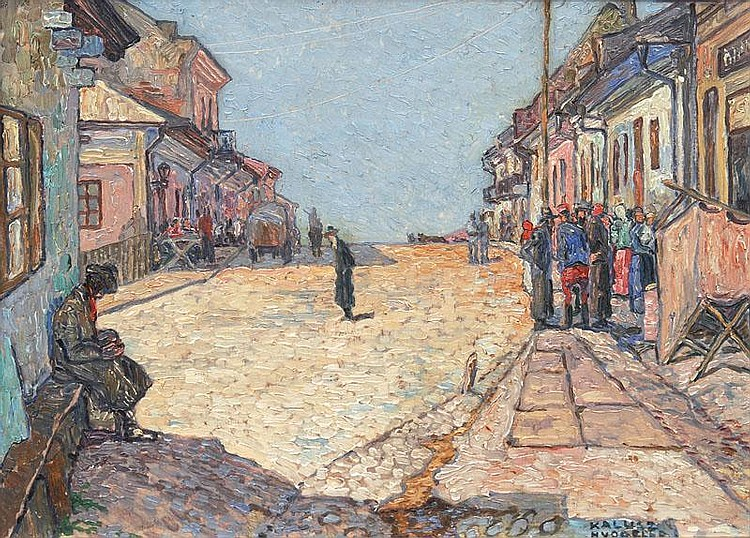
Street scene in Kalusz by Heinrich Vogeler, 1915

Under the Austrian rule Kalush served as a district centre, but its significance suffered a decline comparing to the previous period. In 1912–13 prior to World War I near the city of Kalush an oil rig was built. However, instead of oil, the rig ended up extracting natural gas. For a long time the gas was not utilized, but later was used for heating a potassium quarry and boilers in Boryslav and Drohobych.

In the Second Polish Republic, Kalush/Kalusz was the seat of a county in Stanislawow Voivodeship. Its population was 15,000, almost equal proportions of Poles, Ukrainians and Jews. Following the 1939 Invasion of Poland, the town was annexed by the Soviet Union. Occupied by the Third Reich from 2 July 1941 until 30 July 1944, it returned to the Soviet Union in 1944. During World War II the residents of the city witnessed many ethnocides. In 1940, the Soviets forced inhabitants of Kalush to leave the town and forcefully moved them to Siberia, many of whom were people of various nationalities: Poles, Ukrainians, and others. Then, in late 1941 and 1942, the majority of Kalush's Jewish inhabitants were murdered by the Germans. Since the 16th century, a Jewish community had flourished in the city and at times constituted a majority of its population; however, in 1941, while under Nazi control, that community was virtually eliminated. Polish Home Army (AK) was active in the town and its area. The town itself was captured by the AK in mid-July 1944, during the Operation Tempest. In 1945, Polish residents of Kalush were expelled to the Recovered Territories.

On March 20, 1972, the city of Kalush became a city of regional importance.

Recently several renovations have taken place of several local temples such as the Temple of All Saints of the Ukrainian Orthodox Church (Kyiv Patriarchate), the Catholic Saint Valentine Church, and the Ukrainian Greek-Catholic Church of Saint Nicholas. Kalush residents presented a bust of Taras Shevchenko to Simferopol and erected the first monument to the Kobzar on Crimean soil on August 21, 1997. A monument to Shevchenko was also presented to the city of Novohrodivka, Donetsk region, in honor of the 10th anniversary of Ukraine's independence.

Until 18 July 2020, Kalush was incorporated as a city of oblast significance and served as the administrative center of Kalush Raion though it did not belong to the raion. In July 2020, as part of the administrative reform of Ukraine, which reduced the number of raions of Ivano-Frankivsk Oblast to six, the city of Kalush was merged into Kalush Raion.

== Population ==
Historical population
Year	Pop.	±%
1931	12,000	—
1939	15,000	+25.0%
2001	67,887	+352.6%
2007	67,180	−1.0%
2008	67,150	−0.0%
2009	67,207	+0.1%
2010	67,453	+0.4%
2013	67,585	+0.2%
2016	67,519	−0.1%
2022	65,088	−3.6%
Note: 2010 data is valid through to October

=== Language ===
Distribution of the population by native language according to the 2001 census:

Language	Number	Percentage
Ukrainian	64 715	95.33%
Russian	2 163	3.19%
Other or undecided	1 009	1.48%
Total	67 887	100.00%

== Kalush city council in 2010 ==
Note: Percentage indicates correlation to the total number of seats in the city council which is 50. The results of the election were taken from kalush.net where they were published on 4 November 2010. Election was half and half, one (25 seats) by the "majority rule", another (25 seats) – by "party-list". There were 15 non-affiliated members, all of whom associated themselves with the Ukrainian Party (2006).

Seats and percentage
Ukrainian Party (32)	64%
Rukh (5)	10%
Fatherland (5)	10%
Svoboda (3)	6%
Our Ukraine (2)	4%
FZ (2)	4%
Party of Regions (1)	2%

== Economy ==
Kalush is a historical centre of salt and fertilizer production. It also hosts enterprises operating in the spheres of wood processing, construction industry and brewing.

== Points of interest ==
The city still contains an old rathaus which was declared as the National Landmark of Architecture #591. The previous Rathaus was destroyed during the Khmelnytsky Uprising. The new Rathaus served as a town hall and a directory of agriculture since the 20th century. The conditions of the landmark in 2010 were terrible and the Rathaus required some major renovations. A fire broke out ruins of the Rathaus in 2013.

In the city, there is a mount Vysochanka named after a colonel of the Lysyanka Regiment during the Cossack Hetmanate and a leader of the local uprising in 1648 Semen Vysochan.

== Gallery ==
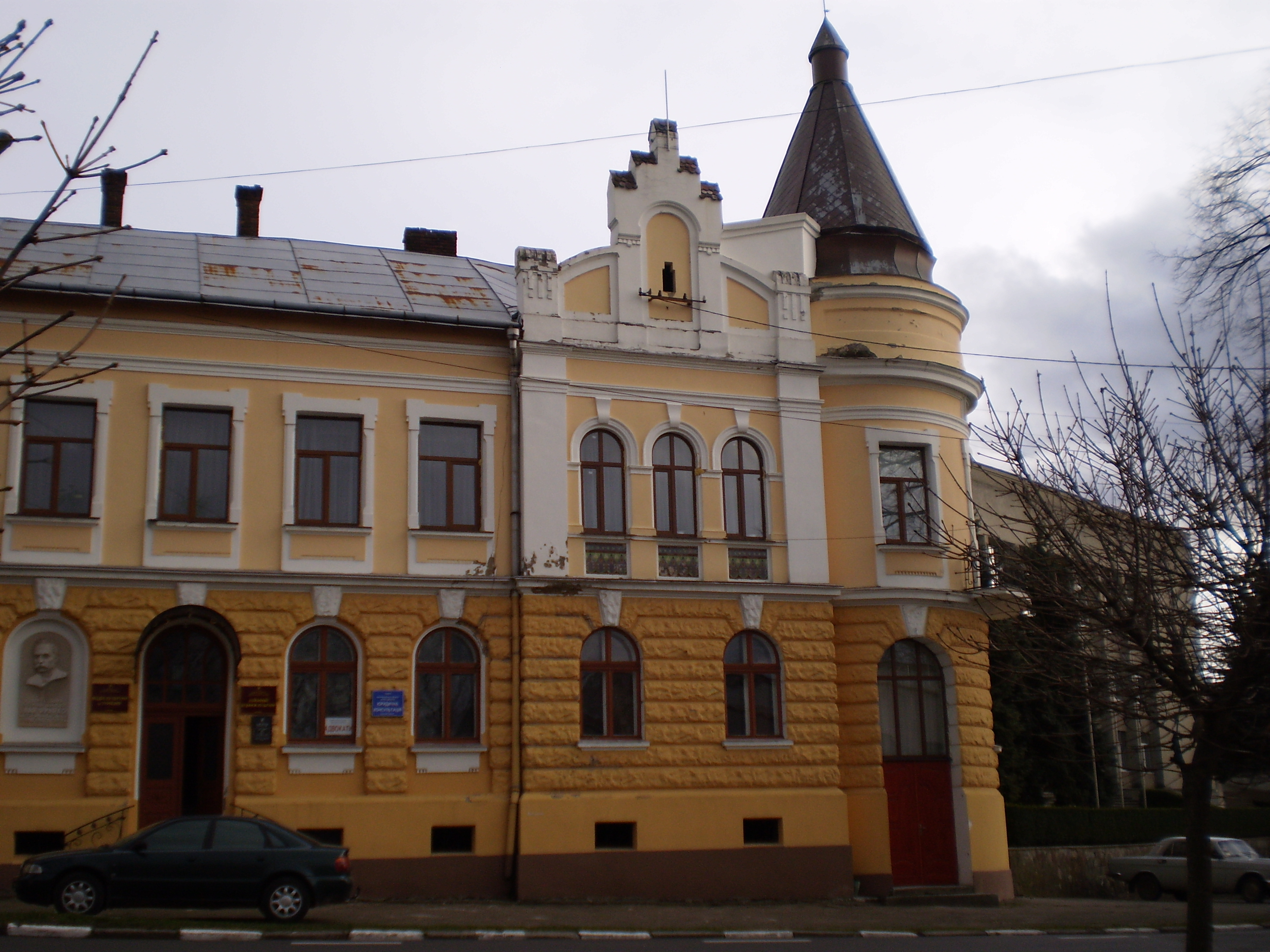
Kalush Cultural House

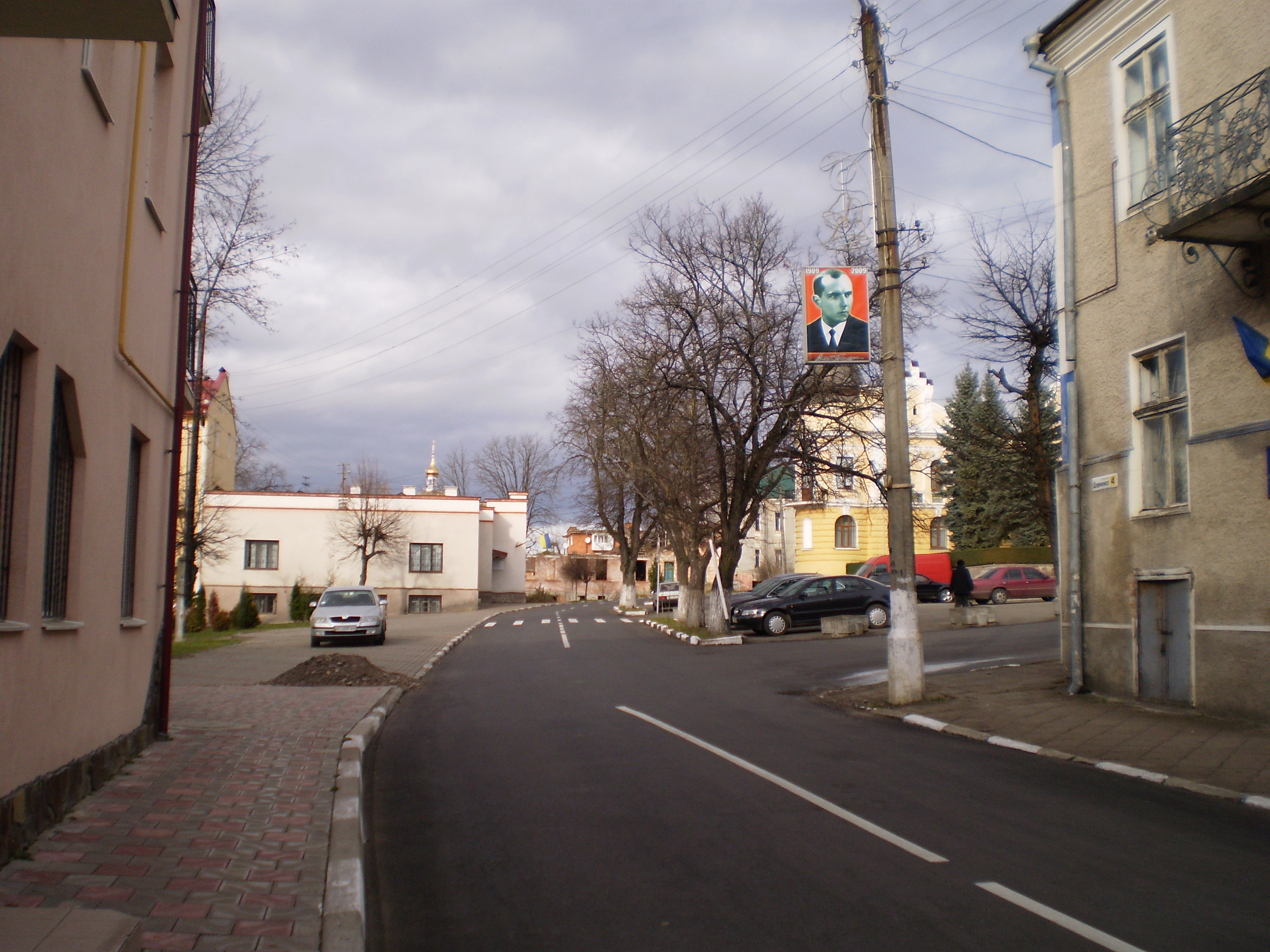
Downtown Kalush

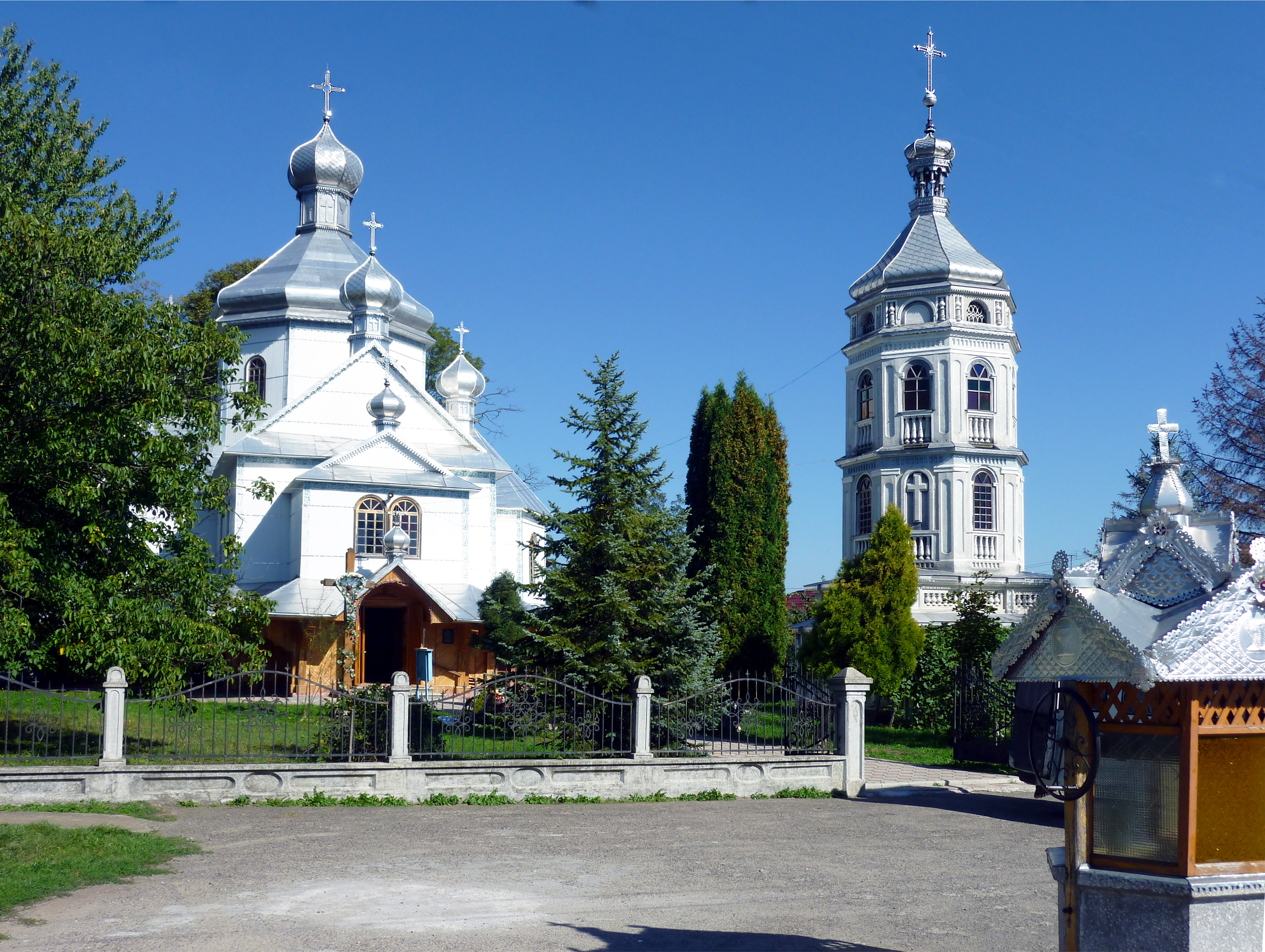
Church of Candlemas

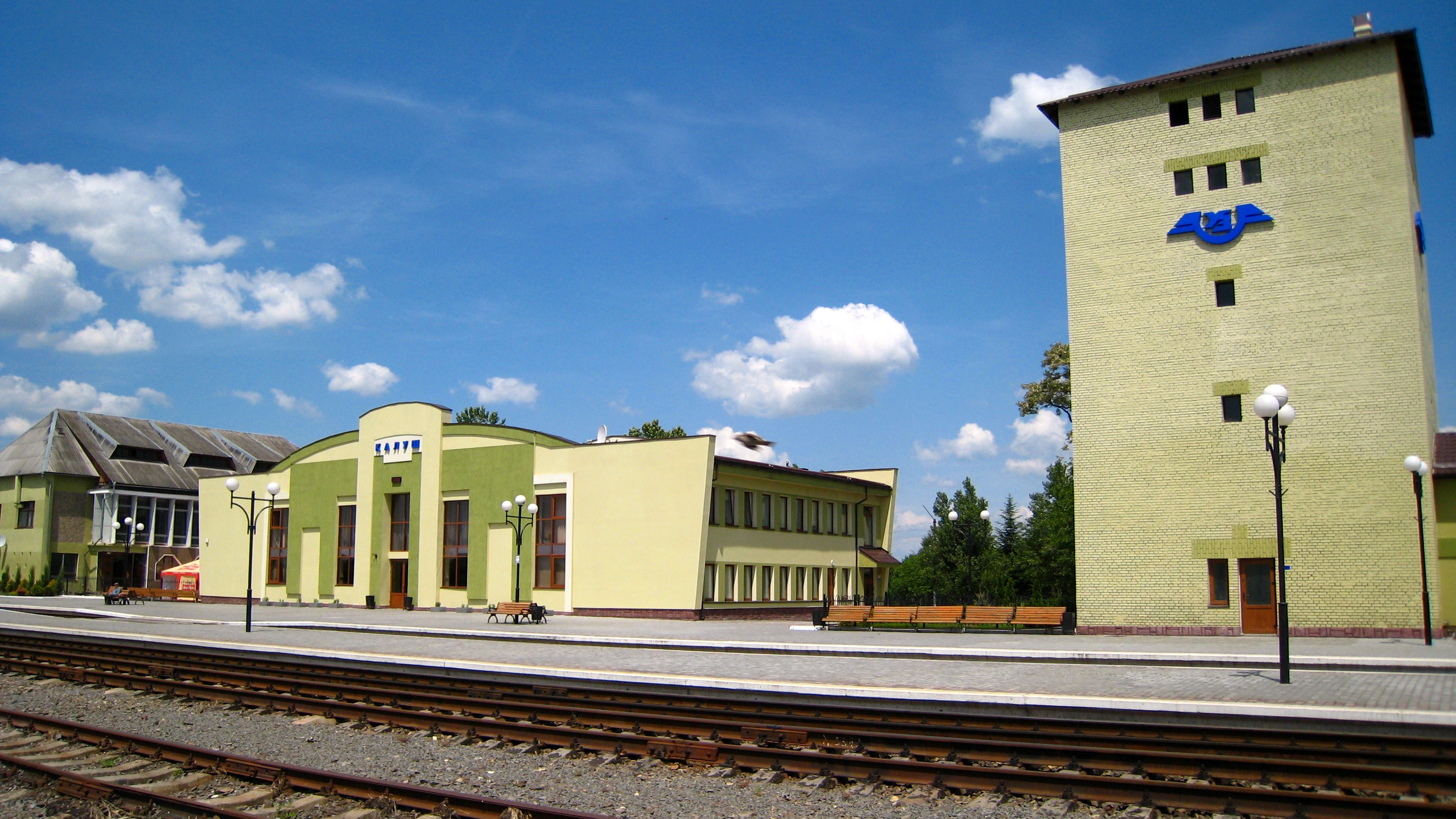
Kalush Railway Station

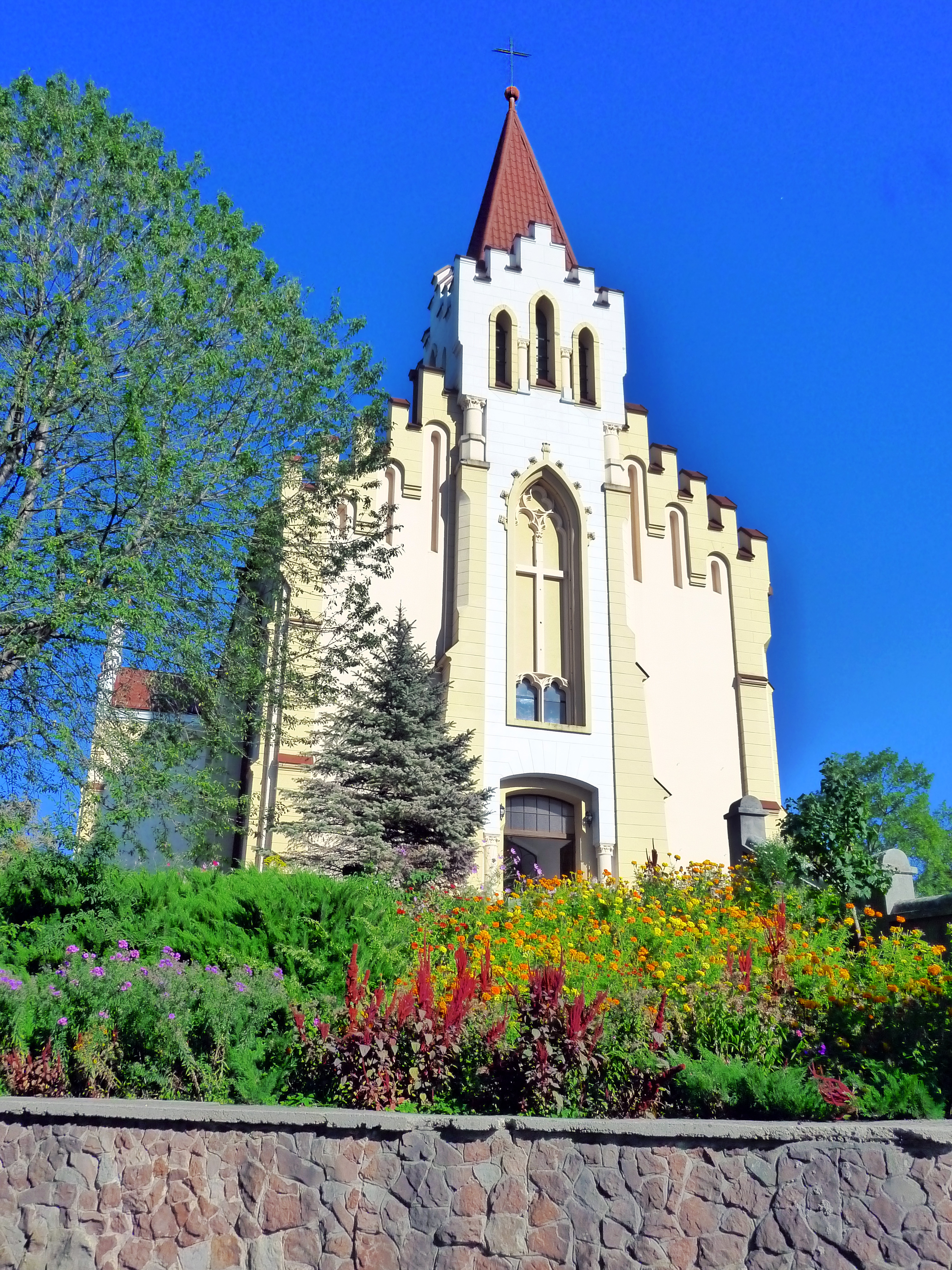
St. Valentine's Catholic Church

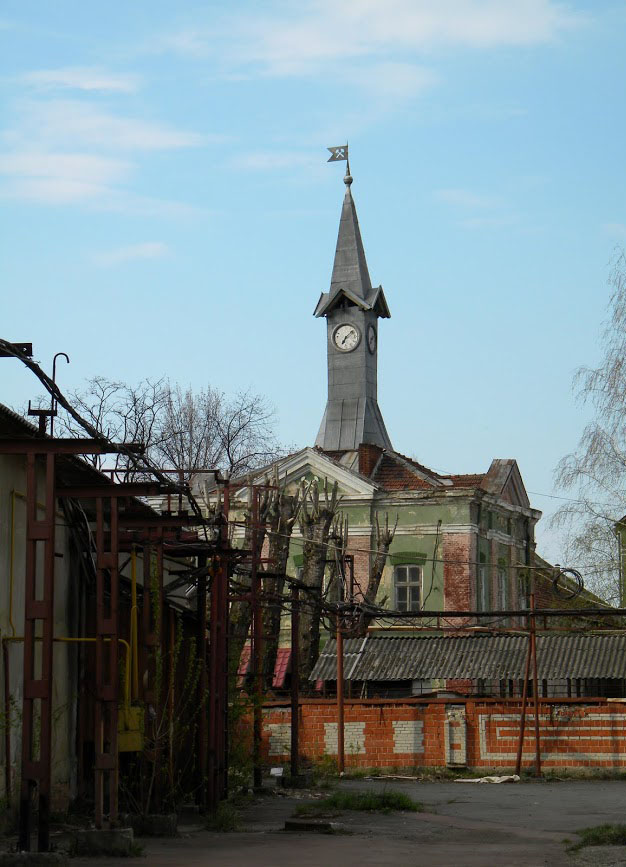
Old potassium plant

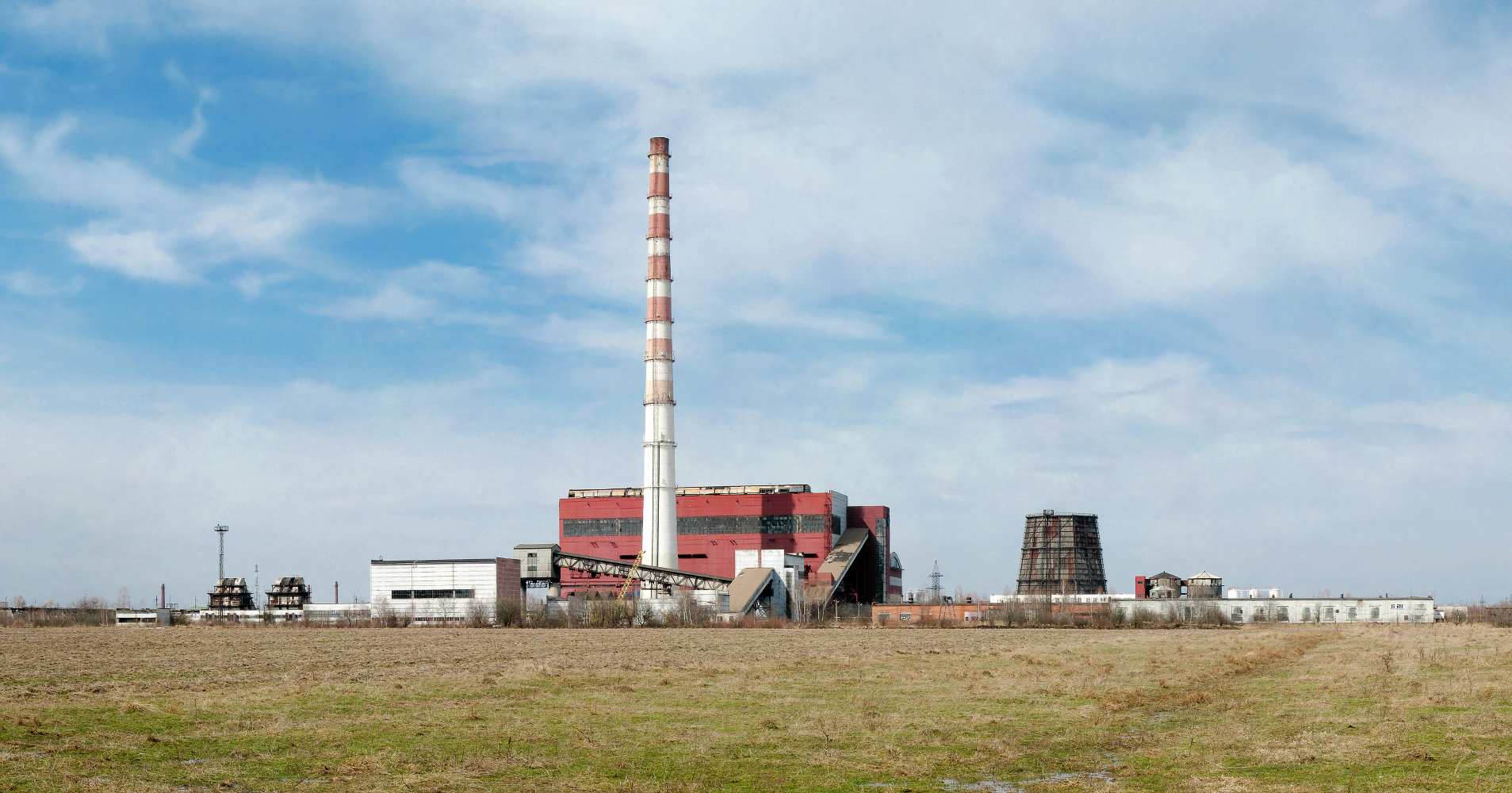
Thermal power plant

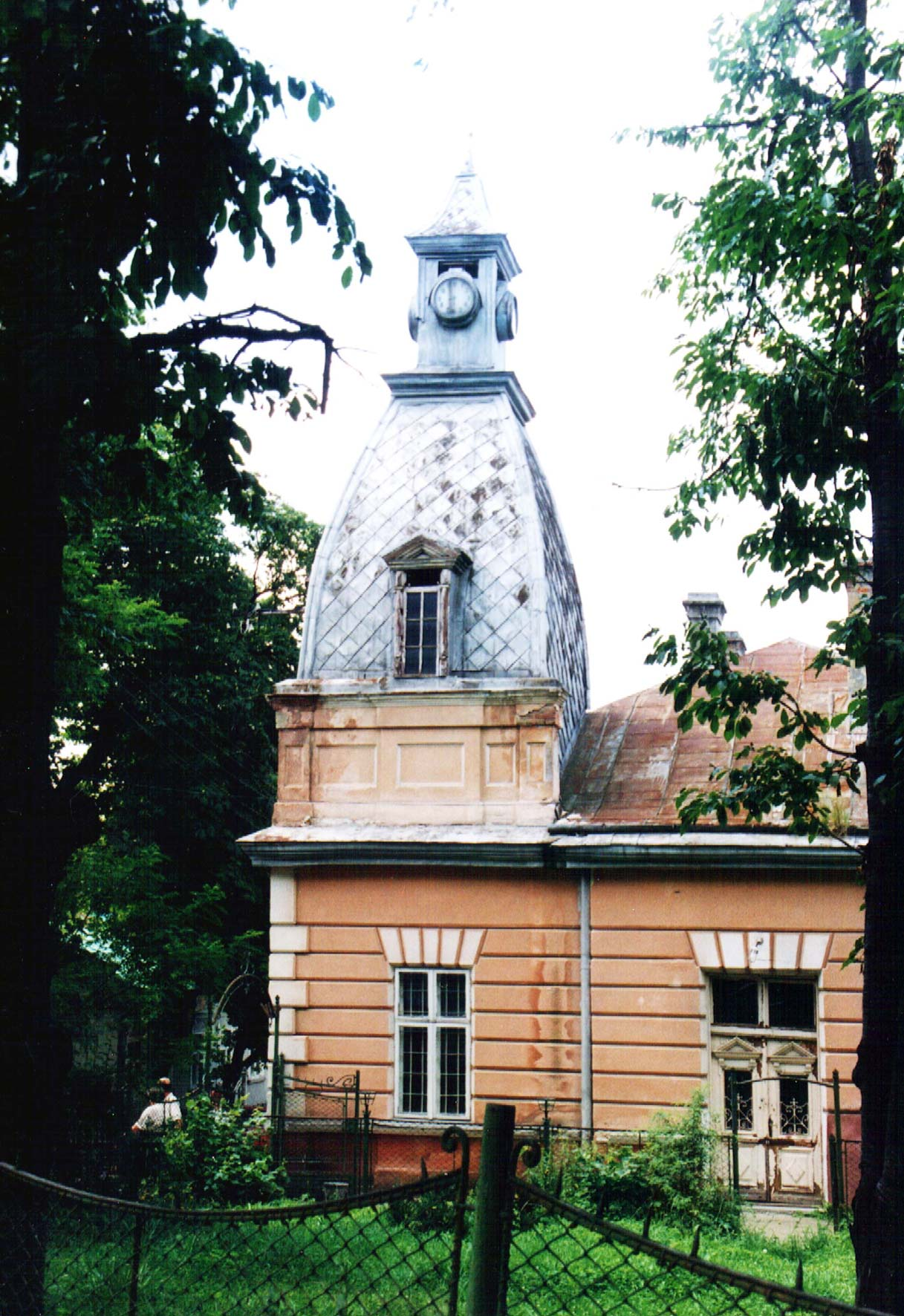
Former town hall (rathaus)

City centre

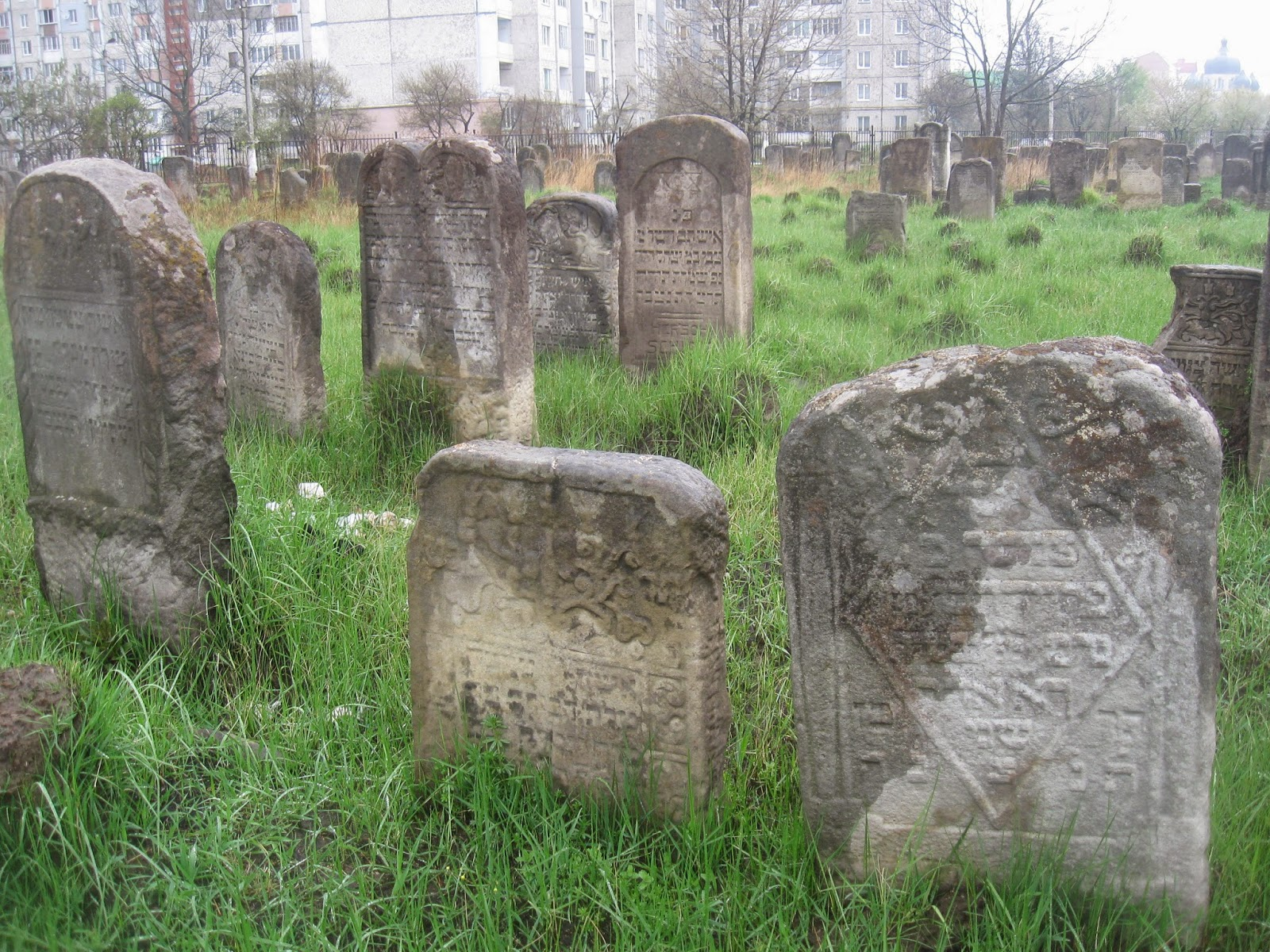
Jewish cemetery

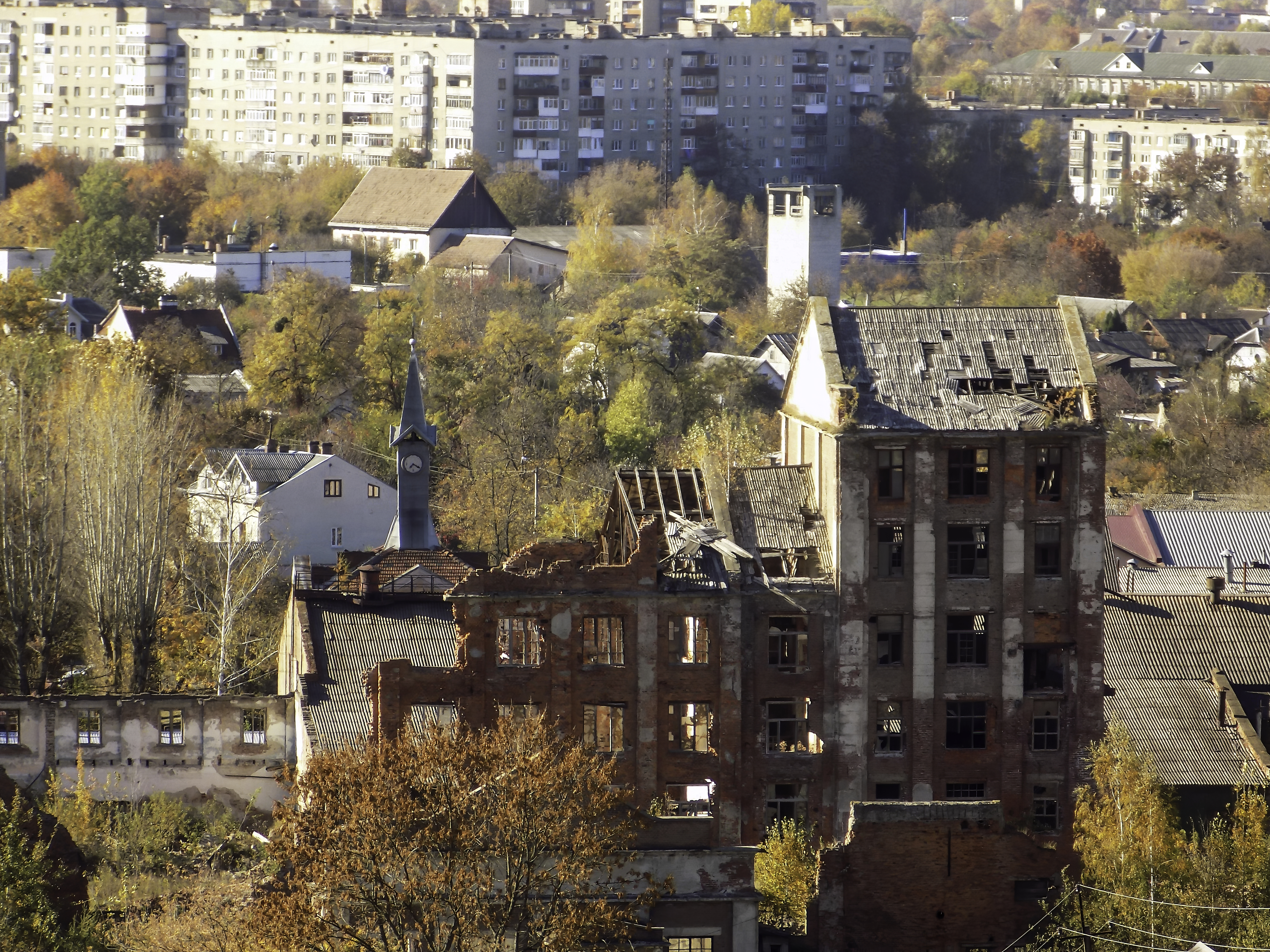
View from town hall

== Notable people ==
- Stepan Bandera
- August Aleksander Czartoryski
- Jakub Sobieski
- Jan "Sobiepan" Zamoyski
- Tomasz Zamoyski
- Fedir Danylak
- Vlad DeBriansky
- Oksana Franko
- Natalie Papazoglu
- Oleh Psiuk, co-founder of Kalush, winners of the Eurovision Song Contest 2022
- Yuriy Izdryk
- M. Lincoln Schuster
- Aryeh Leib HaCohen Heller, Prominent Rabbi and author of the "Ketzos Hachoshen"
- Yehuda Heller Kahana, Prominent Rabbi and author of the "Kuntras HaSfeikos"
- Kateryna Kit-Sadova, Ukrainian media businesswoman

== Twin towns – sister cities ==
Kalush is twinned with:

- Bačka Palanka, Serbia
- Český Krumlov, Czech Republic
- Grand Prairie, United States
- Kędzierzyn-Koźle, Poland
- Merelbeke-Melle, Belgium
- Lohja, Finland

== Location ==
Local orientation

Regional orientation
